= Places of worship in the City of Milton Keynes =

This is a list of places of worship in the City of Milton Keynes that are registered as such in accordance with the Places of Worship Registration Act 1855. (Note: or (being churches of the Church of England) are exempted in the act from the need to do so.)

(The criterion for inclusion in this list is that the location is registered as a "place of worship registered for marriage", as specified in the act. (Note: "Under the provisions of the Places of Worship Registration Act 1855, the owners or trustees of places of worship can certify to the Registrar General for England and Wales that a premise is used as a place of worship and request that it be recorded as such. There is no obligation for places of worship to be recorded under this act. However, a premises first has to be recorded as a place of worship before it can be registered for the solemnisation of marriages under the Marriage Act 1949".) Church of England churches are included because they are explicitly declared in the Act to be exempt from registration. Religious groups that meet in members' houses, or have temporary use of third-party premises, are not included unless they are registered.)

Places recorded by the Registrar General
Civil parish	Name	District	Denomination (Note: As recorded by the Registrar General)	Reg. No.
Abbey Hill	Sikh Temple Ramgarhia Sabha	Kiln Farm	Sikh	79504
Abbey Hill	Church of the Holy Cross	Two Mile Ash	United Reformed, Methodist and Baptist Churches	77842
Abbey Hill	The Church of Jesus Christ of Latter Day Saints	Two Mile Ash	Mormon	77820
Astwood and Hardmead	St Peter's	Astwood	Church of England	(exempt)
Astwood and Hardmead	St Mary's	Hardmead	Church of England	(exempt)
Bletchley and Fenny Stratford	St Mary's Church	Bletchley	Church of England	(exempt)
Bletchley and Fenny Stratford	He Lives Bible Church	Bletchley	Glorious Church	83608
Bletchley and Fenny Stratford	Living Wisdom Word Ministry Milton Keynes	Bletchley	Pentecostal	85417
Bletchley and Fenny Stratford	Oversomers Family Church International	Bletchley	Pentecostal	84524
Bletchley and Fenny Stratford	Queensway Methodist Church	Bletchley	Methodist Church	43969
Bletchley and Fenny Stratford	St Thomas Aquinas Catholic Church	Bletchley	Roman Catholics	65619
Bletchley and Fenny Stratford	Zainabiya Islamic Centre; Ksi Muslim Community of Milton Keynes	Granby	Islam	79445
Bletchley and Fenny Stratford	Arulmegu Meenakshi Amman Temple	Denbigh	Hindus	82356
Bletchley and Fenny Stratford	Believers Loveworld Milton Keynes	Denbigh	Christian	83879
Bletchley and Fenny Stratford	Christ Love Ministries	Denbigh	Charismatic Christians	85066
Bletchley and Fenny Stratford	Happy Church - the Christian Action Faith; Ministries aka Action Chapel International	Denbigh	Evangelical	85263
Bletchley and Fenny Stratford	Hour of Salvation Ministries	Denbigh	Pentecostal	85093
Bletchley and Fenny Stratford	Kharis Family Temple	Denbigh	Pentecostal	84938
Bletchley and Fenny Stratford	Mount House	Denbigh	Christians	83212
Bletchley and Fenny Stratford	Mount Zion the Prayer Mountain	Denbigh	Pentecostal Christian	84048
Bletchley and Fenny Stratford	Mountain of Fire	Denbigh	Pentecostal	83841
Bletchley and Fenny Stratford	On Eagles Wings Church	Denbigh	Christians	83806
Bletchley and Fenny Stratford	Praise Harvest Community Church	Denbigh	Pentecostal	83816
Bletchley and Fenny Stratford	Success Temple	Denbigh	Baptist	83852
Bletchley and Fenny Stratford	St Martin	Fenny Stratford	Church of England	(exempt)
Bletchley and Fenny Stratford	Hazrath Shahjalal Jamie Masjid and Islamic Centre	Fenny Stratford	Islam	83407
Bletchley and Fenny Stratford	St Frideswide	Water Eaton	Church of England	(exempt)
Bletchley and Fenny Stratford	The Kings Centre - Milton Keynes	Water Eaton	Assemblies of God	79789
Bletchley and Fenny Stratford	Methodist Chapel	Water Eaton	Methodist Church	3112
Bletchley and Fenny Stratford	Water Eaton Church Centre	Water Eaton	Baptists	74097
Bow Brickhill	All Saints Church	Bow Brickhill	Church of England	(exempt)
Bradwell	St. Lawrence Church	Bradwell Village	Church of England, Baptists, Methodist and United Reformed Church	76328
Bradwell	Methodist Chapel	Bradwell	Methodist Church	50172
Bradwell	St Augustine's	Heelands	Roman Catholics	75849
Broughton	Milton Keynes Hindu Mandir and Community Centre	Broughton	Hindu	85173
Calverton	All Saints	Lower Weald	Church of England	(exempt)
Campbell Park CP	Church of St Mary Magdalene	Willen	Church of England	(exempt)
Campbell Park CP	Milton Keynes Christian Centre	Oldbrook	Uk Evangelical Alliance	77164
Campbell Park CP	Trinity Centre	Fishermead	Methodist and United Reformed Church	75798
Campbell Park CP	Holy Trinity Church	Little Woolstone	Church of England (ecumeenical)	(exempt)
Campbell Park CP	Woolstone Church	Little Woolstone	Methodist and United Reformed Church	76401
Campbell Park CP	The Seventh Day Adventist Church	Fishermead	Seventh Day Adventists	78713
Castlethorpe	Church of St Simon and St Jude	Castlethorpe	Church of England	(exempt)
Central Milton Keynes	Church of Christ the Cornerstone	Central Milton Keynes	Church of England, Roman Catholics, Baptists, Methodists and United Reformed Church	78477
Central Milton Keynes	Jesus Celebration Centre	Central Milton Keynes	Independent Pentecostal	83168
Central Milton Keynes	Al Rawdha	Central Milton Keynes	Islam	83825
Chicheley	St Lawrence	Chicheley	Church of England	(exempt)
Cold Brayfield	St Mary	Cold Brayfield	Church of England	(exempt)
Clifton Reynes	St Mary the Virgin	Clifton Reynes	Church of England	(exempt)
Gayhurst	St Peter	Gayhurst	Church of England	(exempt)
Emberton	All Saints	Emberton	Church of England	(exempt)
Great Linford	St Andrews Church	Great Linford	Church of England, Baptists, Methodist and United Reformed Church	76327
Great Linford	The Giffard Park Kingdom Hall	Giffard Park	Jehovah's Witnesses	80169
Great Linford	James McKeown Centre	Great Linford	Pentecostal	84605
Great Linford	Life International Christian Fellowship	Great Linford	Pentecostal	80376
Great Linford	Milton Keynes Murugan Temple	Neath Hill	Hindu	85590
Great Linford	Salvation Army Goodwill Centre	Conniburrow	Salvation Army	76522
Great Linford	Milton Keynes & District Reform Synagogue	Giffard Park	Judaism	80582
Hanslope	St James the Great	Hanslope	Church of England	(exempt)
Hanslope	Gold Street Hall	Hanslope	Christians Gathered Unto the Name of the Lord	60790
Hanslope	Methodist Chapel	Hanslope	Methodist Church	3108
Haversham-cum-Little Linford	St Mary	Haversham	Church of England	(exempt)
Haversham-cum-Little Linford	St Leonard	Little Linford	Church of England	(exempt)
Kents Hill and Monkston	Church of Christ the King	Kents Hill	Baptists, Methodist, Roman Catholics and United Reformed Church	78933
Kents Hill and Monkston	Shri Shirdi Saibaba Temple	Kingston	Hindu	85502
Lathbury	All Saints Church	Lathbury	Church of England	(exempt)
Lavendon	St Michael	Lavendon	Church of England	(exempt)
Lavendon	Union Chapel	Lavendon	Baptists and Congregationalists	37058
Little Brickhill	St Mary Magdalene	Little Brickhill	Church of England	(exempt)
Little Brickhill	All Saints	Little Brickhill	Church of England	(exempt)
Little Brickhill	Methodist Chapel	Little Brickhill	Methodist Church	3106
Loughton and Great Holm	All Saints Church	Loughton	Church of England, Methodist and United Reformed Church	77680
Loughton and Great Holm	Loughton Baptist Church	Loughton	Baptists	78519
Milton Keynes CP	All Saints Church	Milton Keynes Village	Church of England, Baptist, Roman Catholics, Methodist and United Reformed Church	78492
Moulsoe	Assumption of Mary	Moulsoe	Church of England	(exempt)
Mousloe	Methodist Church	Mousloe	Methodist Church	74967
New Bradwell	St James Ecumenical Church	New Bradwell	Church of England, Methodists, United Reformed Church and Free Church Christians	76329
New Bradwell	Church of St. John the Baptist	New Bradwell	Baptist	76168
New Bradwell	Faith Tabernacle Church	New Bradwell	United Pentecostal Church	79979
New Bradwell	Gospel Hall	New Bradwell	Christians Gathered Unto the Name of the Lord	55374
New Bradwell	Holding Forth Christian Centre	New Bradwell	Pentecostal	81874
New Bradwell	Jamia Al-Karam	New Bradwell	Islam	76938
New Bradwell	Salvation Army Hall	New Bradwell	Salvation Army	46642
Newport Pagnell	Church of St Peter and St Paul	Newport Pagnell	Church of England	(exempt)
Newport Pagnell	St Luke	Newport Pagnell	Church of England	(exempt)
Newport Pagnell	Lovat Hall	Newport Pagnell	Baptists	79754
Newport Pagnell	Methodist Church	Newport Pagnell	Methodist Church	3109
Newport Pagnell	Newport Pagnell United Reformed Church	Newport Pagnell	United Reformed Church	25594
Newport Pagnell	St Bede's Catholic Church	Newport Pagnell	Roman Catholics	64421
Newport Pagnell	The Gospel Mission	Newport Pagnell	Christians	64403
Newport Pagnell	Word of Light International Ministries	Newport Pagnell	Pentecostal	85421
Newton Blossomville	St Nicholas	Newton Blossomville	Church of England	(exempt)
North Crawley	St Firmin	North Crawley	Church of England	(exempt)
Old Woughton	St Mark's	Woughton-on-the-Green	Church of England	(exempt)
Old Woughton	St Mary's Church	Woughton-on-the-Green	Methodist and United Reformed Church	76330
Olney	SS Peter & Paul	Olney	Church of England	(exempt)
Olney	Church of Our Lady and St. Lawrence	Olney	Roman Catholics	38012
Olney	Cowper Memorial United Reformed Church	Olney	United Reformed Church	25499
Olney	Sutcliff Baptist Church	Olney	Baptists	10386
Olney	Methodist Church	Olney	Methodist	31085
Ravenstone	All Saints	Ravenstone	Church of England	(exempt)
Shenley Brook End	Church of the Servant King	Furzton	Methodist and United Reformed Church	79190
Shenley Brook End	Oak Tree Centre – Shenley Christian Fellowship	Shenley Brook End	Baptist	84355
Shenley Brook End	St. Giles's Church	Tattenhoe	Methodists and United Reformed Church	76331
Shenley Church End	St Mary's Church	Shenley Church End	Ecumenical Christian	77681
Shenley Church End	The Church of St Edward the Confessor	Shenley Church End	Roman Catholics	78315
Shenley Church End	Arulmegu Meenakshi Amman Temple (Hindu Cultural Centre)	Crownhill	Hindu	82829
Sherington	St Laud	Sherington	Church of England	(exempt)
Sherington	United Reformed Church	Sherington	United Reformed Church	11217
Simpson and Ashland	Ecumenical Church of St Thomas the Apostle	Simpson	Church of England, Methodist and United Reformed Church	76169
Simpson and Ashland	The Redeemed Christian Church of God; Water of Life Sanctuary	Simpson	Pentecostal	83530
Stantonbury	Christ Church Stantonbury	Stantonbury	Baptists and Methodist Church	76377
Stantonbury	Kingdom Faith Ministries International	Bradville	Pentecostal	85131
Stoke Goldington	St Peter's	Stoke Goldington	Church of England	(exempt)
Stony Stratford	St Mary & St Giles Church	Stony Stratford	Church of England	(exempt)
Stony Stratford	Baptist Church	Stony Stratford	Baptists	10793
Stony Stratford	Christian Science Society	Stony Stratford	Christians Scientists	55605
Stony Stratford	Greek Orthodox Church of SS Ambrosios and Stylianos: Chapel of St Mary of Vlahern	Stony Stratford	Greek Orthodox Church	82744
Stony Stratford	Methodist Church	Stony Stratford	Methodist Church	12768
Stony Stratford	St Mary Magdelene's Church	Stony Stratford	Roman Catholics	67041
Stony Stratford	Stony Stratford Chapel	Stony Stratford	Independents	9764
Tyringham and Filgrave	St Peter	Tyringham	Church of England	(exempt)
Wavendon	Church of St Mary	Wavendon	Church of England, Baptists, Methodists and United Reformed Church	78378
West Bletchley	St Mary's Church	Old Bletchley	Church of England	(exempt)
West Bletchley	All Saints	West Bletchley	Roman Catholics	73818
West Bletchley	Bletchley Muslim Mosque	West Bletchley	Islam	75793
West Bletchley	Freeman Memorial Methodist Church	West Bletchley	Methodist Church	35183
West Bletchley	Kingdom Hall	West Bletchley	Jehovah's Witnesses	75380
West Bletchley	Salvation Army Hall	West Bletchley	Salvation Army	74938
West Bletchley	St Andrew's Baptist Church	West Bletchley	Baptists	65188
West Bletchley	Whaddon Way Church Centre	West Bletchley	Christians	83508
West Bletchley	Winners Chapel International	West Bletchley	Pentecostal	84362
Weston Underwood	Church of St Laurence	Weston Underwood	Church of England	(exempt)
Woburn Sands	St Michael	Woburn Sands	Church of England	(exempt)
Woburn Sands	Aspley Hill Chapel	Woburn Sands	Christian Brethren	70522
Woburn Sands	Methodist Church	Woburn Sands	Methodist Church	24721
Woburn Sands	The Redeemed Christian Church of God	Woburn Sands	Pentecostal	85311
Wolverton and Greenleys	Holy Trinity Church	Old Wolverton	Church of England	(exempt)
Wolverton and Greenleys	Church of St George the Martyr	Wolverton	Church of England	(exempt)
Wolverton and Greenleys	Emmanuel Hall	Wolverton	New City Baptist Church	84501
Wolverton and Greenleys	Community Church	Wolverton	Christian	75729
Wolverton and Greenleys	Kingdom Hall	Greenleys	Jehovah's Witnesses	76793
Wolverton and Greenleys	Restoration Believers Ministries; International Church	Greenleys	Pentecostal	83835
Wolverton and Greenleys	Christadelphian Church	Greenleys	Christadelphians	75451
Wolverton and Greenleys	Central Mosque, Islamic Educational and Pakistan Community Centre	Wolverton	Islam (Sunni )	79505
Wolverton and Greenleys	Evangelical Prayer Winners Ministry International	Wolverton	Christians	83857
Wolverton and Greenleys	Faith Dimensions Ministries	Wolverton	Christians	80655
Wolverton and Greenleys	Kings Church and Community Centre	Wolverton	Evangelical Alliance	83887
Wolverton and Greenleys	Milton Keynes Christian Science Society	Wolverton	Christian Scientists	74811
Wolverton and Greenleys	St. Francis de Sales' Church	Wolverton	Roman Catholics	18000
Wolverton and Greenleys	Wesley Church	Wolverton	Methodist Church	33534
Wolverton and Greenleys	Wolverton West End United Church	Wolverton	Methodist and United Reformed Church	76193
Wolverton and Greenleys	Hussainia Centre Milton Keynes	Wolverton Mill	Islam (Shia)	85545
Wolverton and Greenleys	New Life Church	Wolverton Mill	Christians	81868
Woughton	Christ the Vine Community Church	Coffee Hall	Methodist Church and United Reformed Church	80639
Woughton	Milton Keynes Muslim Association	Coffee Hall	Islam	84636
Woughton	Gurdwara Baba Zorawar Singh Ji; Baba Fateh Singh Ji	Leadenhall	Sikhs	82030
Woughton	Grand Union Vineyard Milton Keynes	Netherfield	Vineyard Churches Uk & Ireland	76688
Woughton	Kingdom Hall	Netherfield	Jehovah's Witnesses	78087
Civil parish	Name	District	Denomination	Reg. No.
