= Newport Hundred =

Hundred of Buckinghamshire

Coordinates: 52°06′43″N 0°45′39″W

- Area
  - 1861: 74,481 acres (301.41 km^{2})
- Population
  - 1861: 30,226.
- History
  - Created: 13th century
  - Abolished: 1880s
- Status: Hundred
  - HQ: Gayhurst
- Subdivisions
  - Type: Parishes

Newport Hundred was a hundred in the county of Buckinghamshire, England. It encompassed the north of the county, enclosed by the counties of Bedfordshire and Northamptonshire and the Buckinghamshire hundreds of Aylesbury and Buckingham. It was commonly known as "the three hundreds of Newport" because it amalgamated three earlier (11C) hundreds: Bonestou (or Bunsty), Moulsoe and Siglelai (or Seckley/Seckloe/Secklow). Its modern equivalent is the Borough of Milton Keynes, which covers almost exactly the same area (plus a little of the former Winslow Hundred, itself one of 18 ancient hundreds amalgamated under the administrative control of Cottesloe Hundred).

== History ==
Until at least the time of the Domesday Survey in 1086 there were 18 hundreds in Buckinghamshire. It has been suggested however that neighbouring hundreds had already become more closely associated in the 11th century so that by the end of the 14th century the original or ancient hundreds had been consolidated into eight larger hundreds. Newport became the name of the hundred formed from the combined 11th century hundreds of Bonestou, Moulsoe and Sigelai; these original names still persisted in official records until at least the early part of the 17th century. The court leet and "three weeks court" for Newport Hundred were usually held at Bunsty (now part of Gayhurst); in 1830 they also took place at the Swan Inn in Newport Pagnell.

Traces of the moot hill of Sigelai Hundred were discovered by archaeologists working for Milton Keynes Development Corporation, during the construction of Central Milton Keynes; the site is a Scheduled Ancient Monument and lies behind the central library.

== Parishes and hamlets ==
Newport hundred comprised the following ancient parishes and hamlets, (formerly medieval vills), allocated to their respective 11th century hundred:

Bonestou	Moulsoe	Sigelai
Cold Brayfield	Astwood and Water Eaton	Bletchley (with Fenny Stratford)
Gayhurst	Broughton	Bradwell
Hanslope (with Castlethorpe)	Bow Brickhill	Bradwell Abbey
Haversham	Little Brickhill	Calverton
Lathbury	Great Brickhill	Great Linford
Lavendon	Chicheley	Loughton
Little Linford	Clifton Reynes	Newport Pagnell (with Caldecote)
Newton Blossomville	North Crawley	Newton Longville
Olney (with Warrington)	Emberton (with Petsoe Manor)	Shenley (part of)
Ravenstone	Fenny Stratford	Simpson
Stoke Goldington	Hardmead	Stantonbury
Tyringham (with Filgrave)	Milton Keynes	Stoke Hammond
Weston Underwood	Moulsoe	Stony Stratford
	Sherington	Willen
	Walton	Great Woolstone
	Wavendon	Little Woolstone
		Wolverton
		Woughton on the Green

== See also ==
- List of hundreds of England and Wales
