= Grade I listed buildings in the City of Milton Keynes =

There are over 9,000 Grade I listed buildings in England. As of 2025 there are 30 of these buildings in the City of Milton Keynes, a unitary authority area in Buckinghamshire.

== List ==
Name	Location	Type	Completed (Note: The date given is the date used by Historic England as significant for the initial building or that of an important part in the structure's description.)	Date designated	Grid ref. (Note: The grid reference is based on the British national grid reference system, sometimes known as OSGB36, used by the Ordnance Survey.) Geo-coordinates	Entry number (Note: The "List Entry Number" is a unique number assigned to each listed building and scheduled monument by Historic England.)	Image
Parish Church of St Laurence	Weston Underwood	Parish Church	15th century	17 November 1966	SP8636350366; 52°06′50″N 0°45′06″W	1115832	Parish Church of St Laurence More images
Tyringham Hall	Tyringham	Country House	18th century	3 March 1952	SP 85572 46909; 52°08′41″N 0°44′22″W	1115849	Tyringham Hall More images
Tyringham lodges	Tyringham	Lodges	Early 19th century	3 March 1952	SP 86241 47253; 52°08′52″N 0°43′48″W	1115893	Tyringham lodges More images
Stable block to north-east of Tyringham Hall (including Stables Flats 1 and 2)	Tyringham	Stable Block/Domestic (Flats)	Late 18th century	3 March 1952	SP 85675 46995; 52°08′44″N 0°44′16″W	1289308	
All Saints Church	Lathbury	Parish Church	12th to 14th century	17 November 1966	SP 86034 49202; 52°09′56″N 0°43′59″W	1115931	All Saints Church More images
Church of St Simon and St Jude	Castlethorpe	Parish Church	13th century	17 November 1966	SP 81774 42938; 52°06′30″N 0°47′47″W	1115933	Church of St Simon and St Jude More images
Flat Nos. 13-26, Gayhurst Court (formerly listed as Gayhurst House)	Gayhurst	Domestic (Flats/Apartments)	Late 19th century (Adapted)	17 November 1966	SP 83955 45362; 52°07′48″N 0°45′49″W	1115951	Flat Nos. 13-26, Gayhurst Court (formerly listed as Gayhurst House) More images
Church of All Saints	Milton Keynes village	Parish Church	15th century	17 November 1966	SP 86290 39867; 52°04′45″N 0°43′47″W	1125254	Church of All Saints More images
Chapel to N. of Bradwell Abbey House (Chapel of Our Lady of Bradwell)	Bradwell Abbey	Chapel (Former Priory)	13th century	17 November 1966	SP 83872 40595; 52°05′09″N 0°45′56″W	1125271	Chapel to N. of Bradwell Abbey House (Chapel of Our Lady of Bradwell) More images
Church of Saints Peter and Paul	Olney	Parish Church	14th century	17 November 1966	SP 88544 51368; 52°11′07″N 0°41′51″W	1125308	Church of Saints Peter and Paul More images
Church of St Mary	Old Bletchley	Parish Church	12th to 15th century	3 March 1952	SP 85936 34185; 52°01′44″N 0°44′01″W	1125430	Church of St Mary More images
Tickford Bridge	Newport Pagnell	Bridge	1810	3 March 1952	SP 87311 43761; 52°06′59″N 0°42′55″W	1125464	Tickford Bridge More images
Church of St. Mary	Shenley Church End	Parish Church	14th to 15th century	17 November 1966	SP 83335 37953; 52°03′43″N 0°46′28″W	1160730	Church of St. Mary More images
Church of St Mary Magdalene	Willen	Parish Church	17th century	17 November 1966	SP 87588 40993; 52°05′25″N 0°42′39″W	1160998	Church of St Mary Magdalene More images
Church of St. Peter	Gayhurst	Parish Church	18th century (Rebuilt)	3 March 1952	SP 83952 45318; 52°07′47″N 0°45′49″W	1211931	Church of St. Peter More images
Parish church of St Mary	Haversham	Parish Church	12th to 15th century	17 November 1966	SP 83872 43301; 52°06′41″N 0°45′57″W	1212152	Parish church of St Mary More images
Chicheley Hall	Chicheley	Country House	18th century	3 March 1952	SP 90510 44298; 52°07′19″N 0°40′12″W	1212277	Chicheley Hall More images
Church of St Laud	Sherington	Parish Church	15th century	17 November 1966	SP 89632 46849; 52°08′38″N 0°40′50″W	1212353	Church of St Laud More images
Church of St.Michael	Lavendon	Parish Church	12th to 15th century	17 November 1966	SP 91522 51644; 52°11′16″N 0°39′20″W	1212619	Church of St.Michael More images
Church of St. Mary	Moulsoe	Parish Church	14th century	17 November 1966	SP 87391 41103; 52°05′28″N 0°42′51″W	1212922	Church of St. Mary More images
Church of St. Firmin	North Crawley	Parish Church	12th to 14th century	17 November 1966	SP 90547 45377; 52°07′54″N 0°40′09″W	1289229	Church of St. Firmin More images
Church of St Peter	Stoke Goldington	Parish Church	12th to 16th century	17 November 1966	SP 83321 48771; 52°09′40″N 0°46′28″W	1289474	Church of St Peter More images
Church of St Mary	Hardmead	Parish Church	13th to 15th century	17 November 1966	SP 90918 47496; 52°08′59″N 0°39′49″W	1289532	Church of St Mary More images
Church of St Laurence	Chicheley	Parish Church	14th to 16th century	17 November 1966	SP 89632 46849; 52°08′38″N 0°40′50″W	1289597	Church of St Laurence More images
Church of St James the Great	Hanslope	Parish Church	12th to 15th century	17 November 1966	SP 81165 46424; 52°08′27″N 0°48′20″W	1289671	Church of St James the Great More images
Parish Church of St. Mary	Clifton Reynes	Parish Church	12th to 16th century	17 November 1966	SP 87588 50325; 52°10′33″N 0°42′38″W	1289894	Parish Church of St. Mary More images
Church of All Saints	Ravenstone	Parish Church	11th to 15th century	17 November 1966	SP 85935 48777; 52°09′40″N 0°44′01″W	1320219	Church of All Saints More images
Tyringham Bridge	Tyringham	Bridge	Early 19th century	3 March 1952	SP 85586 47040; 52°08′46″N 0°44′21″W	1320229	Tyringham Bridge More images
Church of St Peter and St Paul	Newport Pagnell	Parish Church	14th century	17 November 1966	SP 87311 43761; 52°06′59″N 0°42′55″W	1332203	Church of St Peter and St Paul More images
Church of St Lawrence	Broughton	Parish Church	14th and 15th century	17 November 1966	SP 87042 38947; 52°04′16″N 0°43′11″W	1332313	Church of St Lawrence More images

== See also ==
- Grade II* listed buildings in the City of Milton Keynes
- Scheduled monuments in the City of Milton Keynes
