= Newport Pagnell Rural District =

Former local government area in the UK

Coordinates: 52.0866°N 0.7222°W

Newport Pagnell
- Rural district
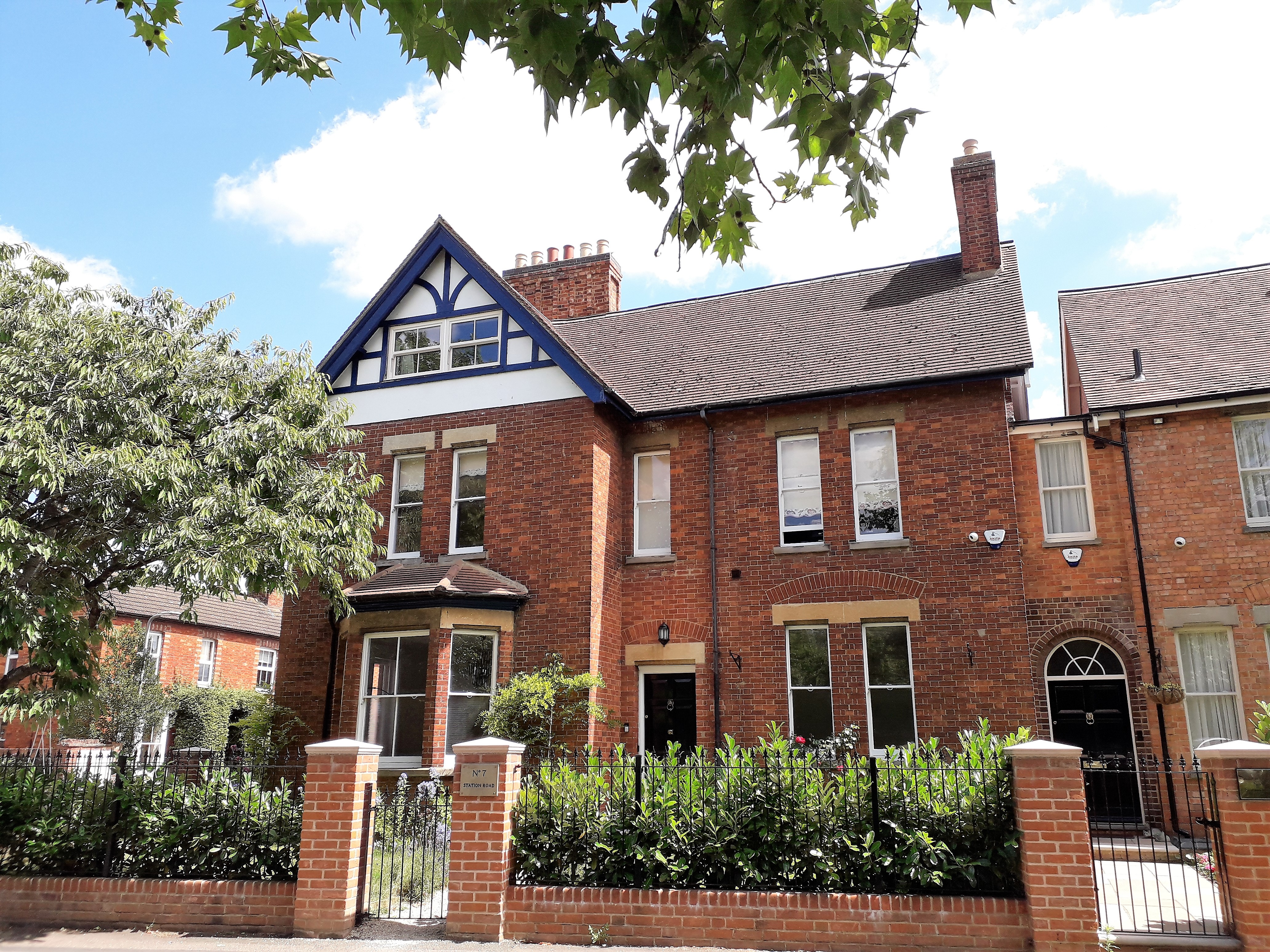
- 7 Station Road, Newport Pagnell: Council offices 1926–1974
- Area
  - 1911: 67,060 acres (271.4 km^{2})
  - 1961: 61,688 acres (249.6 km^{2})
- Population
  - 1901: 19,173
  - 1971: 15,615
- History
  - Created: 28 December 1894
  - Abolished: 31 March 1974
  - Succeeded by: Milton Keynes district
- Status: Rural district
  - HQ: Newport Pagnell

Newport Pagnell was a rural district in the administrative county of Buckinghamshire, England, from 1894 to 1974, covering an area in the north-east of the county.

== History ==
The district had its origins in the Newport Pagnell Poor Law Union, which had been created in 1835, covering Newport Pagnell itself and several surrounding parishes. In 1872 sanitary districts were established, giving public health and local government responsibilities for rural areas to the existing boards of guardians of poor law unions. The Newport Pagnell Rural Sanitary District was administered from Newport Pagnell Union Workhouse, which had been built in 1836 at 1 London Road in Newport Pagnell.

Under the Local Government Act 1894, rural sanitary districts became rural districts from 28 December 1894. The Newport Pagnell Rural District Council held its first meeting on 2 January 1895 at the workhouse, when John Robert Wilmer was appointed the first chairman of the council.

Shortly after the district's creation, efforts began to create separate urban district councils for the main two towns in the district: Fenny Stratford and Newport Pagnell itself. The Fenny Stratford Urban District was created on 1 July 1895, removing the parishes of Fenny Stratford and Simpson from the district. The parish of Newport Pagnell similarly became Newport Pagnell Urban District on 1 October 1897. The parish of Bletchley was subsequently transferred in 1898 from Newport Pagnell Rural District to the Fenny Stratford Urban District (which was renamed Bletchley Urban District in 1911).

In 1967 the new town of Milton Keynes was designated, with a significant portion of the south-west of Newport Pagnell Rural District falling within its designated area. The Milton Keynes Development Corporation was established to oversee construction of the new town, and Newport Pagnell Rural District Council lost its town planning responsibilities in that area to the development corporation.

== Civil parishes ==
- Astwood
- Bletchley (until 1898), Bow Brickhill, Bradwell, Bradwell Abbey, Broughton
- Castlethorpe, Chicheley, Clifton Reynes, Cold Brayfield
- Emberton
- Fenny Stratford (until 1895)
- Gayhurst, Great Brickhill, Great Linford, Great Woolstone (until 1934),
- Hanslope, Hardmead, Haversham
- Lathbury, Lavendon, Little Brickhill, Little Linford, Little Woolstone (until 1934), Loughton
- Milton Keynes, Moulsoe
- Newport Pagnell (until 1897), Newton Blossomville, Newton Longville (until 1934), North Crawley
- Olney
- Petsoe Manor
- Ravenstone
- Shenley Church End, Sherington, Simpson (until 1895), Stantonbury, Stoke Goldington
- Tyringham and Filgrave
- Walton, Warrington, Water Eaton, Wavendon, Weston Underwood, Willen (until 1934), Woburn Sands (from 1907), Woolstone cum Willen (from 1934), Woughton on the Green

== Premises ==
Until the 1920s the council met at the Newport Pagnell Union Workhouse, with administrative functions carried out at the offices of the solicitor who acted as clerk to the council. In 1926 the council bought a large house at 7 Station Road in Newport Pagnell for £1,000, converting it to become its offices and meeting place. The council remained based at 7 Station Road until its abolition in 1974.

== Abolition ==
Newport Pagnell Rural District was abolished under the Local Government Act 1972, with the area becoming part of the non-metropolitan district of Milton Keynes under Buckinghamshire County Council on 1 April 1974. (The district subsequently gained Borough status, became an independent unitary authority and – in 2022 – became the City of Milton Keynes.)

== See also ==
- History of Milton Keynes
