= Scheduled monuments in the City of Milton Keynes =

This list of scheduled monuments in the City of Milton Keynes lists the 49 scheduled monuments in the part of Buckinghamshire administered by Milton Keynes City Council.

A scheduled monument is a nationally important archaeological site or monument which is given legal protection by being placed on a list (or "schedule") by the Secretary of State for Culture, Media and Sport; English Heritage takes the leading role in identifying such sites. The current legislation governing this is the Ancient Monuments and Archaeological Areas Act 1979. The term "monument" can apply to the whole range of archaeological sites, and they are not always visible above ground. Such sites have to have been deliberately constructed by human activity. They range from prehistoric standing stones and burial sites, through Roman remains and medieval structures such as castles and monasteries, to later structures such as industrial sites and buildings constructed for the World Wars or the Cold War.

Name	Location	Type	Completed (Note: The date given is the date used by Historic England as significant for the initial building or that of an important part in the structure's description.)	Grid ref. (Note: The grid reference is based on the British national grid reference system, sometimes known as OSGB36, used by the Ordnance Survey.) Geo-coordinates	Notes	Entry number (Note: The "List Entry Number" is a unique number assigned to each listed building and scheduled monument by Historic England.)	Image	Ref.
Ravenstone Priory, moats and fishponds	Ravenstone	Priory	13th century	SP 85000 50999; 52°09′03″N 0°45′33″W	Site of Augustinian priory founded 1254 and dissolved 1525, now occupied by the 19th century Abbey Farm.	1006917	Upload Photo	
Roman site at Olney	Olney	Roman building and settlement	Roman	SP 89355 52632; 52°09′53″N 0°41′42″W	A rectangular Roman building and settlement site	1006918	Upload Photo	
Wood Farm Moat	Clifton Reynes	Moated Site	Medieval	SP 93264 49696; 52°08′23″N 0°38′19″W	A probable medieval and/or post-medieval subrectangular moated site.	1006919	Upload Photo	
Group of ring ditches and enclosures at Tyringham	Tyringham	Ring ditches		SP 85793 48292; 52°04′15″N 0°45′32″W		1006924	Group of ring ditches and enclosures at Tyringham	
Site of Great Linford Brickworks	Great Linford	Brickworks	Victorian	SP 85976 41577; 52°03′58″N 0°44′48″W	Two multi-flue down draught brick kilns plus remains of a third.	1006927	Site of Great Linford Brickworks More images	
Tickford Bridge	Newport Pagnell	Bridge	1810	SP 87807 43823; 52°05′09″N 0°43′12″W		1006933	Tickford Bridge More images	
Wolverton aqueduct	Wolverton, Cosgrove	Aqueduct	1809	SP 80042 41798; 52°04′08″N 0°50′00″W	Carries the Grand Union canal over the river Great Ouse	1006934	Wolverton aqueduct More images	
Olney Bridge	Olney, Emberton	Bridge	1832	SP 88809 50867; 52°08′56″N 0°42′12″W	Segmental arches with projecting keystones, four arched, with semi-circular cutwaters.	1006936	Olney Bridge	
Tyringham Bridge	Tyringham	Bridge	1792	SP 85798 46524; 52°07′08″N 0°44′39″W	A single segmental arch over R. Ouse, ashlar stone, rusticated archway, wide string at road level, panelled segmental parapet with coping.	1006941	Tyringham Bridge	
Roman town of Magiovinium and Roman fort	Fenny Stratford	Roman town and fort		SP 89018 33707; 51°59′32″N 0°42′14″W	Roman settlement consisting of five phases of occupation, with a hearth, building, pits , ditches, a clay floor, pottery, and a terret ring.	1006943	Roman town of Magiovinium and Roman fort	
Moated site and fishpond at Old Rectory Farm, Woughton	Woughton on the Green	Moated site and fishpond	Medieval	SP 87100 37565; 52°01′47″N 0°43′39″W		1007930	Moated site and fishpond at Old Rectory Farm, Woughton	
Fishpond in Water Spinney 600m SE of St Giles's Church Tattenhoe	Tattenhoe	Fishpond	Medieval	SP 83263 33372; 51°59′25″N 0°47′06″W		1007931	Upload Photo	
Bradwell castle mound: a motte and bailey castle 80m north east of St. Lawrence's Church, Bradwell	Bradwell	Motte and bailey castle	Medieval	SP 83194 39526; 52°02′52″N 0°47′18″W	A small motte and bailey castle some 0.5 hectares in area which survives as a turf covered earthwork 22m in diameter and up to 2.3m high	1007935	Upload Photo	
The Toot: a motte and bailey castle and later manorial complex 450m south west of St Mary's Church, Shenley Church End	Shenley Church End	Motte and bailey castle and manorial complex	Medieval	SP 82886 36454; 52°01′13″N 0°47′37″W	The motte survives as a circular earthen mound 1.3m high and 36m in diameter	1007936	The Toot: a motte and bailey castle and later manorial complex 450m south west of St Mary's Church, Shenley Church End	
Moated site and fishponds at Great Woolstone, Campbell Park	Woolstone	Moated site and fishponds	Medieval	SP 86290 39715; 52°02′57″N 0°44′35″W		1007937	Moated site and fishponds at Great Woolstone, Campbell Park More images	(Note: Campbell Park (civil parish), not the park)
Shrunken Medieval Village, Woughton on the Green	Woughton on the Green	Medieval Village	Medieval	SP 86968 36932; 52°01′26″N 0°44′02″W		1007938	Shrunken Medieval Village, Woughton on the Green	
Moated site, fishponds and associated earthworks, west of All Saints Church, Milton Keynes Village.	Milton Keynes Village	Moated site	Medieval (c. 1250–1350)	SP 88644 39180; 52°02′38″N 0°42′32″W		1007939	Upload Photo	
Secklow Hundred mound: a moot at the junction of North Row and North Ninth Street.	Central Milton Keynes	Moot Mound	Anglo-Saxon (7th-9th Century)	SP 85124 39177; 52°02′40″N 0°45′37″W	The monument includes the site of a Moot marked by a circular mound 24m in diameter and up to 1m high with a surrounding ditch 1m wide and 0.3m deep.	1007940	Secklow Hundred mound: a moot at the junction of North Row and North Ninth Street. More images	
Shrunken medieval village at Caldecotte	Caldecotte (Walton)	Deserted village	Medieval	SP 89334 35390; 52°00′35″N 0°41′59″W		1007941	Upload Photo	
Moated site, fishponds and deserted medieval village of Tattenhoe, 300m west of Home Park Farm, Shenley Brook End	Tattenhoe	Deserted village	Medieval	SP 82898 33939; 52°00′46″N 0°45′45″W		1007942	Upload Photo	
Bradwell Abbey: a Benedictine priory, chapel and fishpond	Bradwell Abbey	Priory	Medieval	SP 82698 39530; 52°02′53″N 0°47′44″W		1009540	Bradwell Abbey: a Benedictine priory, chapel and fishpond More images	
Lavendon Castle: a motte and bailey and associated enclosures at Castle Farm, Lavendon	Lavendon	Motte and bailey	Medieval	SP 91684 54341; 52°10′47″N 0°39′38″W		1009542	Lavendon Castle: a motte and bailey and associated enclosures at Castle Farm, Lavendon More images	
Bowl barrow at junction of Crofts End and Bedford Road	Sherington	Barrow	Prehistoric	SP 89371 46435; 52°06′32″N 0°41′47″W		1010190	Upload Photo	
The Bury: a ringwork and associated earthworks 100m north of Lavendon Church	Lavendon	Ringwork	Medieval	SP 91608 53761; 52°10′28″N 0°39′42″W		1011295	Upload Photo	
Moated site and fishponds 200m north-west of Up End	North Crawley	Moated Site	Medieval	SP 91795 46037; 52°06′18″N 0°39′40″W	The moated site 200m north-west of Up End survives largely undisturbed and is a good example of its class	1011296	Upload Photo	
Moated site, fishpond and associated earthworks 150m west of Loughton Manor	Loughton	Moated site	Medieval (Peak period c. 1250–1350)	SP 83859 37480; 52°01′46″N 0°46′45″W		1011297	Upload Photo	
Bradwell Bury: a moated site and associated manor house remains at Moat House	Bradwell	Moated Site	Medieval (11th–17th Century occupation)	SP 83005 39619; 52°02′56″N 0°47′28″W		1011298	Upload Photo	
Castlethorpe Castle: a motte and bailey, possible ringwork and associated earthworks 200m south-east of Castlethorpe Lodge	Castlethorpe	Motte and Bailey Castle	Medieval	SP 79714 44343; 52°05′30″N 0°50′16″W		1011299	Castlethorpe Castle: a motte and bailey, possible ringwork and associated earthworks 200m south-east of Castlethorpe Lodge	
Moated site, fishponds and associated earthworks 150m south-east of Haversham Manor	Haversham	Moated site	Medieval	SP 82849 42577; 52°04′31″N 0°47′33″W		1011300	Upload Photo	
Motte castle 200m south-east of Wavendon Manor	Wavendon	Motte Castle	Medieval (11th–13th Century)	SP 91932 37142; 52°01′30″N 0°39′40″W		1011301	Upload Photo	
Danesborough Camp: a slight univallate hillfort 420m north of The Knoll	Woburn Sands	Hillfort	Iron Age	SP 92102 34824; 52°00′15″N 0°39′35″W		1011302	Danesborough Camp: a slight univallate hillfort 420m north of The Knoll	
Moated site 70m south of Long Plantation, Hanslope Park	Hanslope	Moated Site	Medieval	SP 82315 45452; 52°06′05″N 0°47′59″W		1011303	Upload Photo	
Moated site and associated enclosure at Uphoe Manor Farm 700m east of Lavendon Church.	Lavendon	Moated Site	Medieval	SP 92323 53601; 52°10′23″N 0°39′05″W		1011305	Upload Photo	
Moated site and fishponds 280m south-east of St Lawrence's Church	Weston Underwood	Moated Site	Medieval	SP 86628 50273; 52°08′38″N 0°44′08″W		1011306	Upload Photo	
Lavendon Abbey: the site of a Premonstratensian abbey, fishponds and field system at Lavendon Grange	Lavendon	Abbey Site and Fishponds	Medieval (Founded c. 1154–1158)	SP 90071 53580; 52°10′24″N 0°41′03″W		1011309	Upload Photo	
A medieval manorial complex comprising a twin moated site, fishpond and associated earthworks 750m west of St Mary's Church	Shenley Church End	Moated site	Medieval	SP 82400 36676; 52°01′21″N 0°48′02″W		1011310	Upload Photo	
Moated site with associated earthworks, 770m south of St Mary's Church, south of the junction of Childs Way and Fulmer Street	Shenley Church End	Moated Site	Medieval	SP 83474 35986; 52°00′58″N 0°47′06″W		1011311	Upload Photo	
Moated site and associated fishpond south of Mill Lane	Woolstone	Moated site	Medieval	SP 87590 39128; 52°02′37″N 0°43′27″W	"The moated site south of Mill Lane survives largely undisturbed and is an excellent example of its class".	1011312	Upload Photo	
Motte and bailey castle, deserted village and monastic grange at Old Wolverton	Old Wolverton	Motte and bailey castle	11th to 15th centuries	SP 80199 41205; 52°03′48″N 0°49′53″W	"Old Wolverton presents a particularly well preserved medieval landscape with an unusual variety of surviving components including a motte-and- bailey castle, a deserted village, a monastic grange and earlier buried remains of the Roman and Saxon periods".	1013660	Motte and bailey castle, deserted village and monastic grange at Old Wolverton	
Roman villa 300m south east of Newton Lodge Farm	Newton Blossomville	Roman villa	2nd to 4th centuries AD	SP 91222 51477; 52°09′15″N 0°40′05″W		1014794	Upload Photo	
Moated site immediately south of Manor Farm	North Crawley	Moated Site	Medieval	SP 94349 44623; 52°05′31″N 0°37′27″W		1016703	Upload Photo	
Moated site 410m south east of Maukins	Hardmead	Moated Site	Medieval	SP 94125 48121; 52°07′24″N 0°37′35″W		1018726	Upload Photo	
Moated site at Old Moat Farm, North Crawley	North Crawley	Moated Site	Medieval	SP 92171 45056; 52°05′46″N 0°39′21″W		1018761	Upload Photo	
Moated site known as Caves Manor immediately east of the Manor House	Sherington	Moated Site	Medieval (Early 12th Century origin)	SP 88983 46254; 52°06′27″N 0°42′08″W		1019138	Upload Photo	
Medieval manor of Simpson	Simpson	Deserted medieval village and moated site	Medieval	SP 88418 35904; 52°00′52″N 0°42′47″W		1021370	Upload Photo	
Remains of the church and churchyard of St Mary Magdalen	Stony Stratford	Church	13th century	SP 78596 40659; 52°03′32″N 0°51′18″W		1021371	Remains of the church and churchyard of St Mary Magdalen More images	
Deserted medieval settlement at Filgrave, immediately west of Rectory Farm	Filgrave	Deserted village	Medieval	SP 87781 48437; 52°07′38″N 0°43′09″W		1021372	Upload Photo	
Site of St Martin's Chapel, Ekeney; 680m south east of Petsoe Manor Farm	Emberton	Church site	Medieval	SP 92296 48763; 52°07′46″N 0°39′11″W		1021373	Upload Photo	
Civil War defences in Bury Fields	Newport Pagnell	Earthworks	1645	SP 87512 44083; 52°05′18″N 0°43′27″W		1021389	Civil War defences in Bury Fields	

== See also ==
- Grade I listed buildings in the City of Milton Keynes
- Grade II* listed buildings in the City of Milton Keynes
