= Chicheley Brook =

River in Buckinghamshire, England

Coordinates: 52.088889°N 0.708333°W

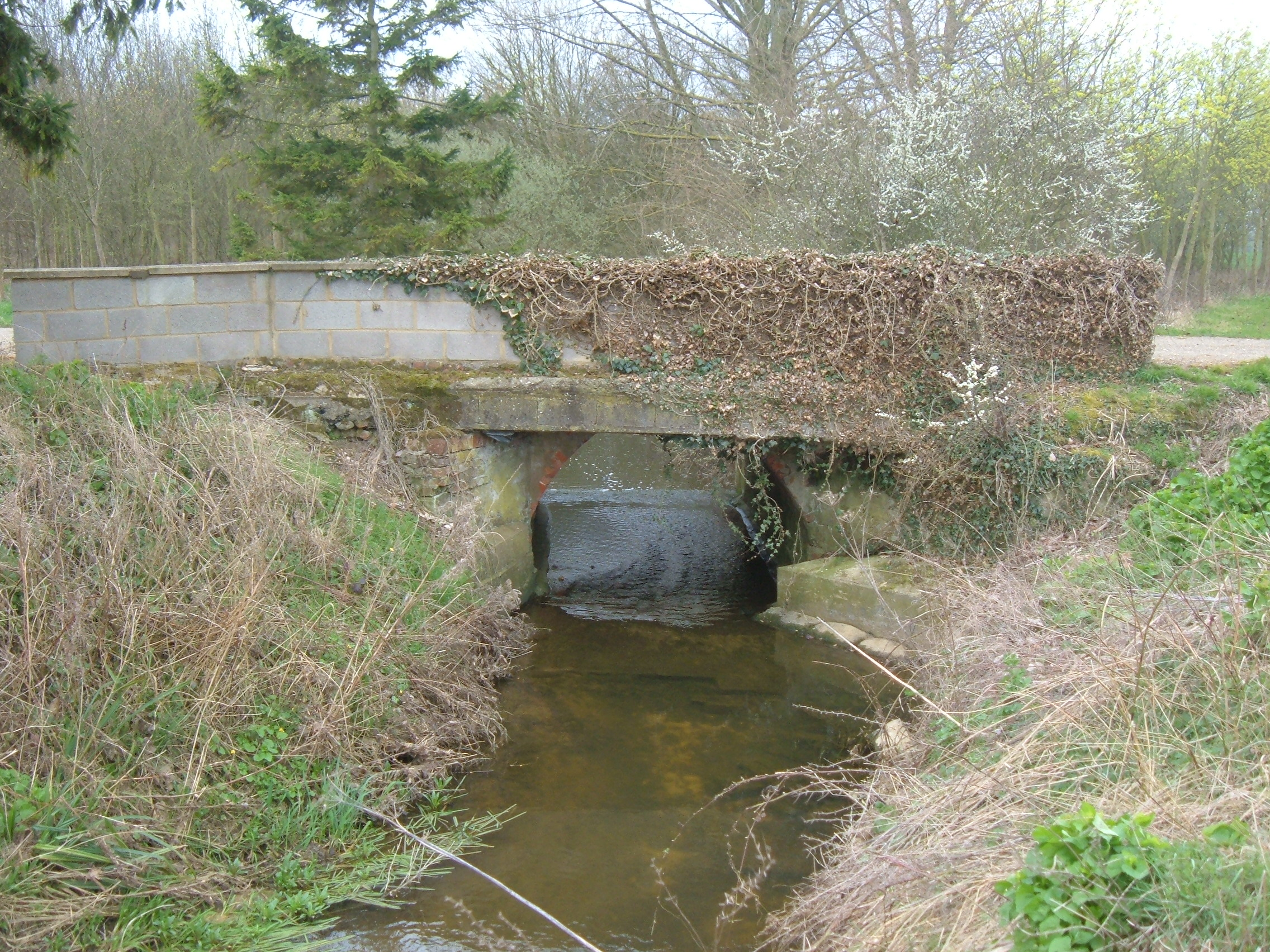
A bridge over Chicheley Brook, just west of North Crawley

Chicheley Brook – formerly known by the alternative name Tickford Brook – is a 14.11 km (8.77 mi) long river in Buckinghamshire, England, that is a tributary to the River Great Ouse. Located entirely in the City of Milton Keynes, the river rises near the village of Cranfield, flows north-west around North Crawley then turns west before Hardmead; it then follows a southerly course past Chicheley for 1.90 km (1.18 mi) before resuming its westerly course and flowing into the River Great Ouse near Newport Pagnell.

== Water quality ==
Water quality of Chicheley Brook in 2019, according to the Environment Agency, a non-departmental public body sponsored by the UK's Department for Environment, Food and Rural Affairs:

Section	Ecological Status	Chemical Status	Overall Status	Length	Catchment	Channel
Chicheley Brook	Poor	Fail	Poor	14.116 km (8.771 mi)	32.355 km^{2} (12.492 sq mi)	
