= Castlethorpe railway station =

Disused railway station in England

Castlethorpe
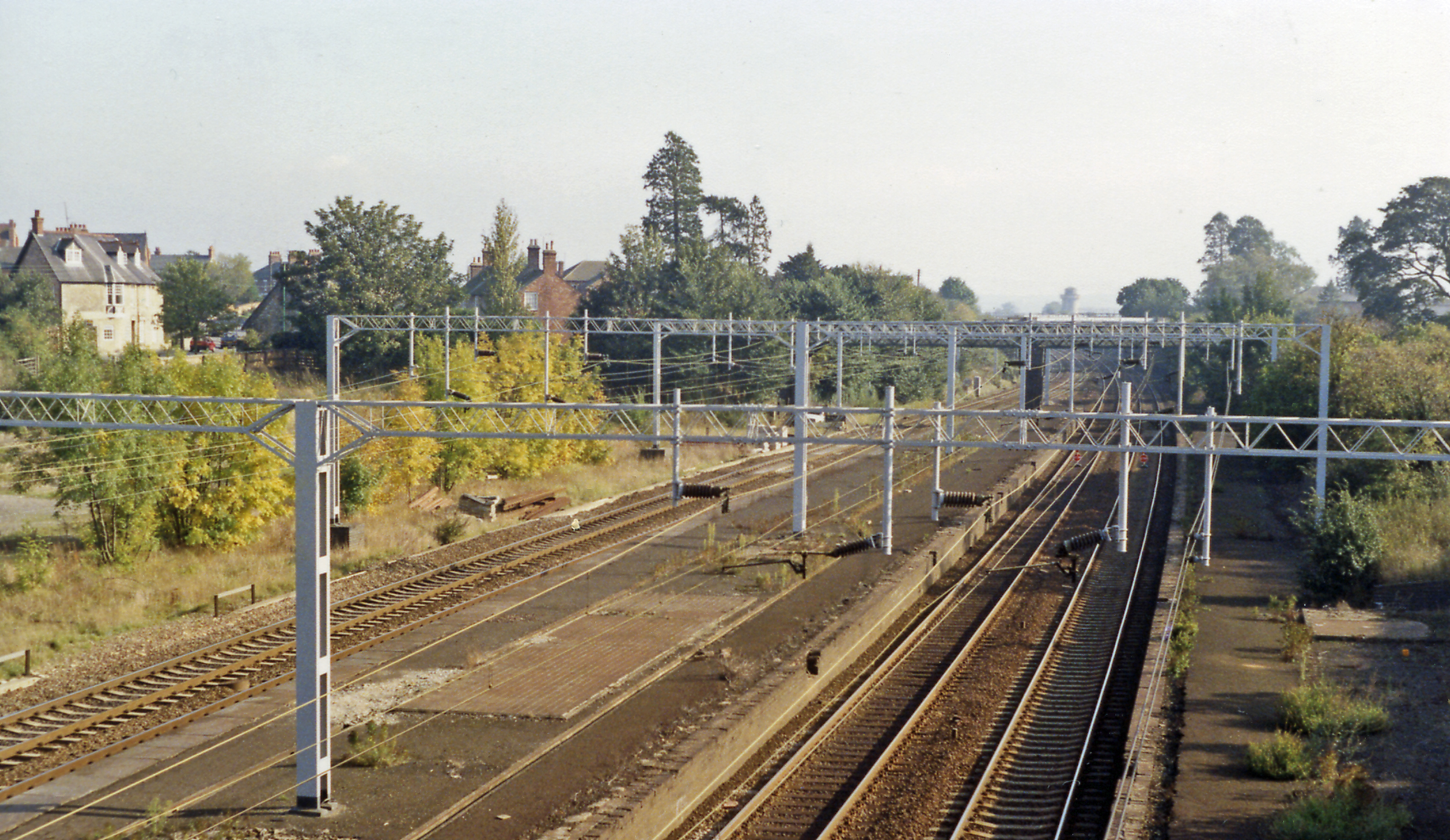
- Remains of the station (1991)

General information
- Location: Castlethorpe, Milton Keynes; England
- Coordinates: 52.0925°N 0.8388°W
- Grid reference: SP796444
- Platforms: 4

Other information
- Status: Disused

History
- Original company: London and North Western Railway
- Pre-grouping: London and North Western Railway
- Post-grouping: London Midland and Scottish Railway; London Midland Region of British Railways

Key dates
- 2 August 1882: Opened
- 6 July 1964: Goods facilities withdrawn
- 6 September 1964: Closed
Location

Castlethorpe railway station was a railway station serving the Buckinghamshire village of the same name in what is now the City of Milton Keynes district, on the West Coast Main Line in England. The station was located south of the bridge over the current line on what remains Station Road.

== History ==
Castlethorpe station was opened for goods in 1881 and the first passenger train arrived at 8.30am on Monday, 2 August 1882.

=== Closure ===
Despite a strong campaign to keep the station open, mounted by the parish council, Sir Frank Markham, Member of Parliament for Buckingham and Robert Maxwell the prospective Labour Party candidate, the station was closed to passengers on 6 September 1964.

== Routes ==
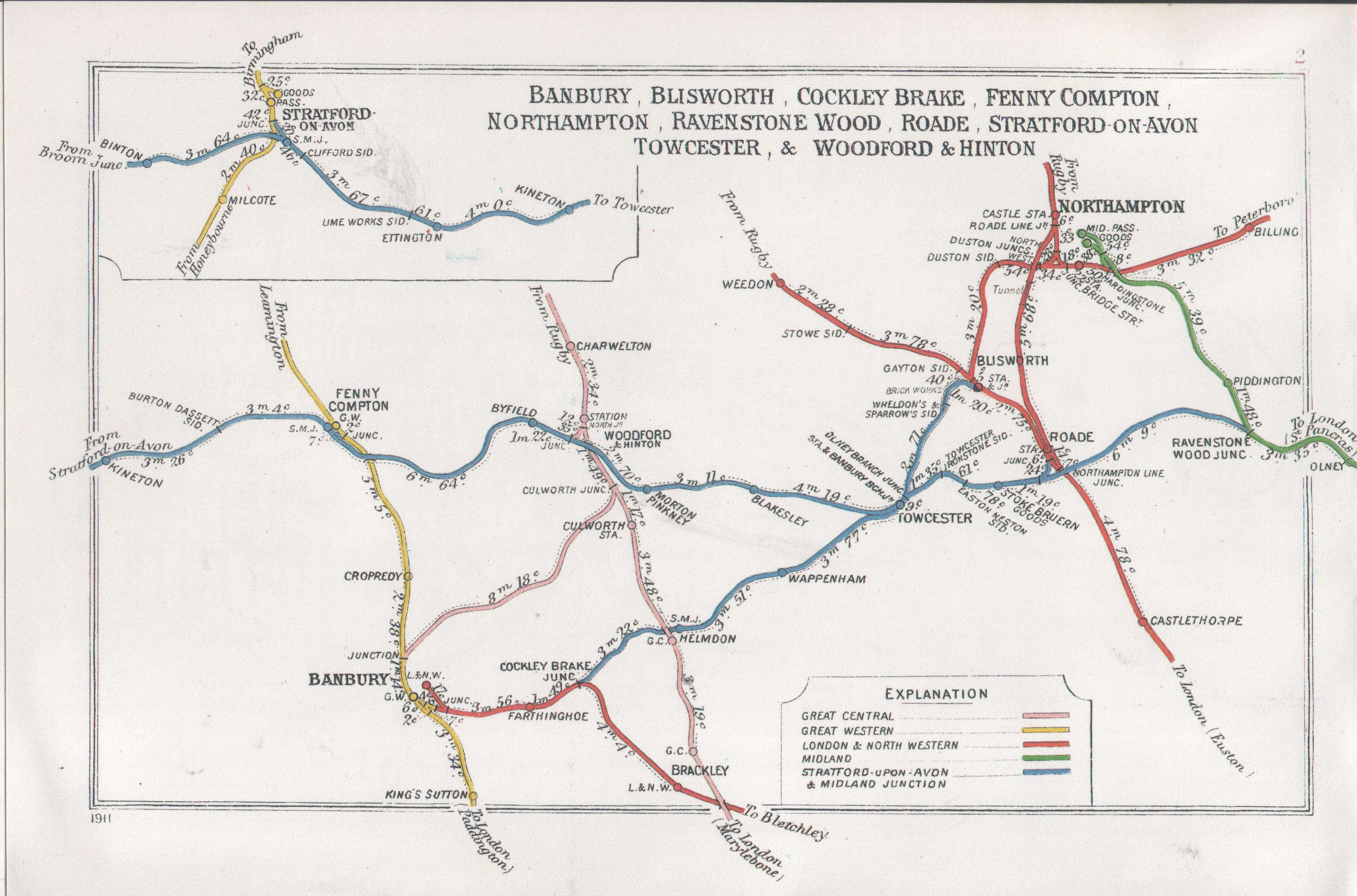
A 1911 Railway Clearing House map of railways in the vicinity of Castlethorpe (lower right, in red)

| Preceding station | Historical railways | Following station |
|---|---|---|
| Roade; Line open, station closed | London and North Western Railway; West Coast Main Line | Wolverton; Line and station open |

== Present day ==
The West Coast Main Line runs through the site of the station where sections of the platforms were still in site in 2025 along with its overhead bridge. The buildings were demolished soon after closure.

== See also ==
- Roade cutting
