= Church of St Simon and St Jude, Castlethorpe =

Church in Buckinghamshire, England

Coordinates: 52.0933°N 0.8344°W

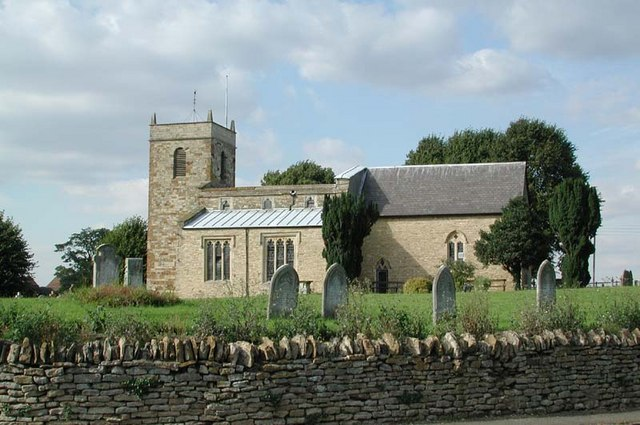
St Simon and St Jude, Castlethorpe

Church of St Simon and St Jude Church is a late 12th century parish church in Castlethorpe, City of Milton Keynes, Buckinghamshire, England. It was formerly a chapelry of Hanslope. Of note is the Norman font with figures at the corners. It was designated a Grade I listed building in 1966.

== History ==
The dedication feast is kept on the Sunday after the festival of SS. Simon and Jude; though in old wills this is called "the church of Our Lady of Castlethorpe."

== Architecture and fittings ==
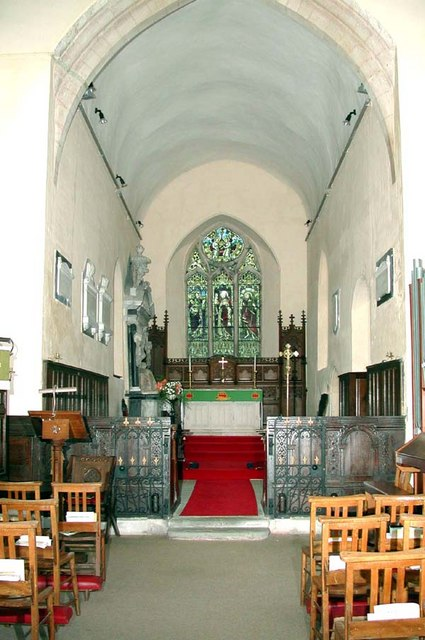
Interior view

The church is built on an eminence, a little eastward of the keep, as appears from the height of the bank or mount still remaining close to the church-yard. It comprises a chancel, nave, north and south aisles, and a tower at the west end. The last appendage was originally 71 feet (22 m) high; but the rain having been suffered to destroy the timbers of the roof, it fell down in 1729; and being meanly rebuilt, was lowered about 30 feet (9.1 m), and only the second of three bells, which it contained, was put up again. The large bell, weighing 4 cwt. 2 qrs. 18 lbs., which was broken, was sold together with the third, to Fenny Stratford, to defray the expenses of rebuilding the tower. The roofs of the nave and aisles are covered with lead; but the roof of the chancel is modern and slated. The principal entrance is through the tower at the west end.

The piers and arches of the nave are very Early English, hardly removed from Norman. Two of these arches on each side, divide the nave from the aisles; those of the south side are supported by an octagonal pillar, and those on the north rest upon a massive round pillar, with foliage mouldings. Three decorated windows of three lights, one being in the east end, light the south aisle; and two modern sash windows have been inserted in the north aisle. There are three windows on the south side of the clerestory of the nave; none on the north side. The oak pulpit is square, and apparently of the time of James i.; the seats are open, and of deal. The roofs throughout are ceiled with plaster. At the east end of the north aisle still remain the steps of the rood loft, in a good state of preservation. On the south side of the chancel is a sedile of two stalls under semi-circular arches and a piscina. The font is very large, and octagonal, having two sculptured human heads annexed to two of its western angles. The chancel arch is pointed, and the chancel itself is spacious.

The east window is a good Decorated one of three lights, containing a memorial to the memory of Caroline Walpole (died 22 February 1899). Within the communion rails are three flat slabs inscribed to members of the Tyrrell family; and on the north side is a stately monument to Sir Thomas Tyrrell, who died in 1671, and Bridget, his wife. It consists of an altar-tomb of veined marble on which are two black marble pillars, with white bases and capitals, supporting a richly ornamented pediment, with frieze and cornice, surmounted by an urn, and shields of arms. On a slab of jet covering the altar-tomb, between the pillars, are the effigies, in full size, of Sir Thomas, habited as a judge, reclining on a mat and cushions, his head resting on the lap of a female, sitting in a melancholy position. This monument, which was erected by widow Dame Bridget Tyrrell, bears an inscription recording the gift to the poor of Castlethorpe of £10 per annum. There are also memorials to the Kitelee family.
