= All Saints Church, Lathbury =

Coordinates: 52.096359°N 0.724797°W

All Saints' Church
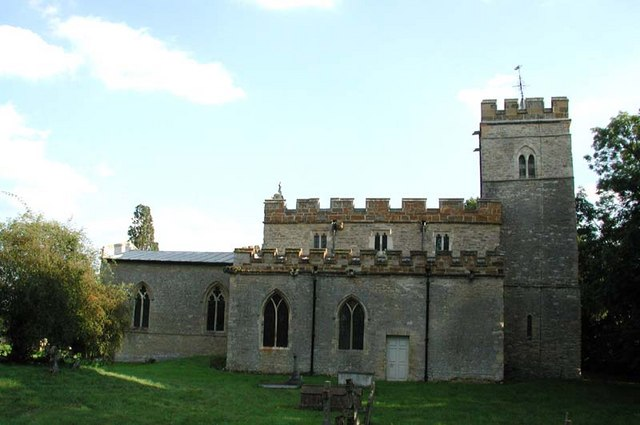
- All Saints' Church, Lathbury

- Location within Buckinghamshire
- Location: Lathbury, Milton Keynes, Buckinghamshire
- Country: England
- Denomination: Anglican

History
- Status: Parish church

Architecture
- Heritage designation: Grade I listed building
- Designated: 17 November 1966
- Style: Norman, Early English, Decorated
- Years built: 12th century

Specifications
- Capacity: 110

Administration
- Province: Canterbury
- Diocese: Oxford
- Deanery: Newport
- Benefice: Newport Pagnell

All Saints' Church is a 12th-century parish church in Lathbury in the City of Milton Keynes, Buckinghamshire, England. It was designated a Grade I listed building in 1966.

== Architecture and fittings ==
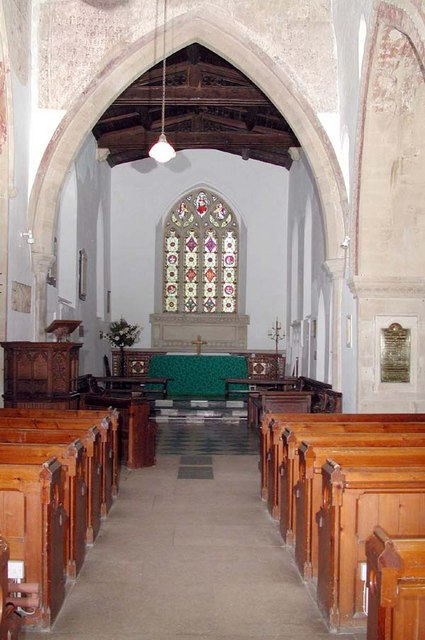
Interior view

The church is an ancient structure, consisting of a west tower, clerestoried nave, north and south aisles, south porch, and chancel. The tower, nave, and aisles, are embattled, the roofs are covered with lead, the east end of the chancel is finished with a plain parapet, and the porch is plain and gable-roofed, and retains the stone sediles. The tower contains a clock, and four bells.

The earliest work in the building is Norman, of which style the south doorway and some piers and arches on that side are plain examples. The tower is Early English, with a later battlement added; the rest is Decorated, with some very good windows. At the angles of the aisles are large gurgoyles, and there is a cross on the apex of the nave. The south aisle is divided from the nave by two pointed arches supported by a massive circular pillar; the north side being ornamented with a band of zig-zag moulding. The pillar on the south side is decorated with curious carving, probably from designs brought home by a crusader, depicting grotesque dragons having two heads, one at each extremity, and foliage. In one of the square piers in the south aisle is a slab, carved in bold relief, with some creature resembling a serpent and two curiously formed animals. The two pointed arches of the north aisle rise to a greater height than the arches on the opposite side. There is a piscina at the east end of the south aisle, shewing the spot to be the site of an altar in ancient times. In the south aisle are the steps which formerly led to the rood loft. The oak roofs are not concealed by ceilings; that of the nave is supported by sculptured corbels of stone. The six clerestory windows are pointed, and of two lights each. The pulpit is of oak, and octagonal in shape. At the west end is a circular arch, now filled up; and the walls throughout the church retain much of the old paintings in distemper. The chancel arch is pointed, and the east window is of four lights, with quatrefoils in the head, and filled with stained glass, representing Our Lord seated, and in the act of blessing; angels, the sacred monogram, the symbols of the Evangelists, flowers, and foliage. The sedilia, or three seats in the south wall for the priests, has trefoil heading, and a plain band running along the top. In the same wall is the piscina, a very good one, with a pillar supporting the arch. The chancel is paved with black and white marble, laid at the cost of Sir H. Andrewes, bart, at the request of his daughter Margaret, to whom there is a long poetic epitaph in this marble floor. On many of the white marble squares are memorials of the Andrewes family interred there. Near the communion table is an inscription to Elizabeth, Lady Leigh, Baroness of Stonly, who died in 1678.

On the north side of the chancel is a mural marble tablet with the representation of a lady in Elizabethan costume kneeling at an altar, behind her is a youth, also kneeling, and two babies in a cradle; above the heads of the children are the arms and crest of the family of Chandflower. Near the above, is a brass plate, with arms, and under them, an inscription. In the nave, near the pulpit, is affixed a brass plate, with arms, crest, and inscription. In the north aisle is a mural monument of marble, containing a long inscription to Henry Uthwatt. In the same vault is buried Frances (died 1800), his wife, daughter of Sir J. Chester, Bart. There are likewise in the church memorials of the families of Dobinson and Forster. The church register dates from 1690.
