= St Mary's Church, Bletchley =

Coordinates: 51.9958°N 0.7444°W

St Mary's Church
- Parish Church of Bletchley
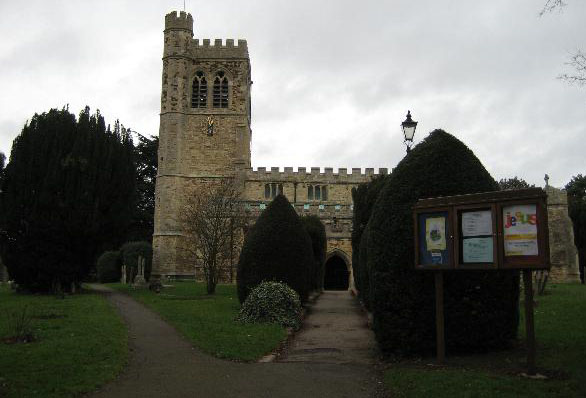
- View of the church from the south.
- St Mary's Church
- Location: Bletchley, Milton Keynes, Buckinghamshire
- Country: England
- Denomination: Church of England
- Website: https://www.stmarysbletchley.org/

Architecture
- Style: Norman, English Gothic
- Years built: Norman, 13–15th centuries

Administration
- Diocese: Oxford

St Mary's Church is the Anglican parish church in Bletchley, a constituent town of Milton Keynes in Buckinghamshire, England. St Mary's is located on Church Green Road, Bletchley.

== History ==
The church dates from Norman times and the arch of the south doorway is Norman. The chancel is 13th century and there were additions in the 14th and 15th centuries.

More recently, the Church has moved away from a traditional choir and organ and now have a band.

== Services ==
Since St John's joined St Mary's, all services are now at St Mary's. The latest schedule of services is available from the church website.
