= Filgrave =

Hamlet in Buckinghamshire, England

Coordinates: 52°07′32″N 0°43′54″W

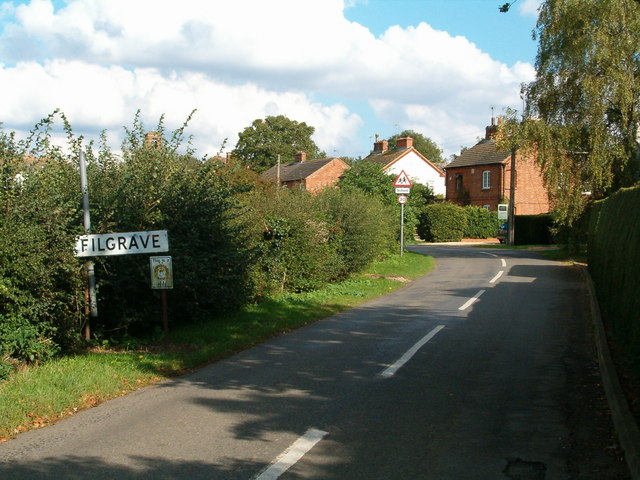
Filgrave

Filgrave is a hamlet in the unitary authority area of the City of Milton Keynes, Buckinghamshire, England. It is about 3 miles (4.8 km) north of Newport Pagnell and 6 miles (9.7 km) north-east of Central Milton Keynes.

The hamlet name is an Old English language word, and means 'Fygla's grove'. In manorial rolls of 1241 it was listed as Filegrave.

== Civil parish ==
Together with its neighbouring village, it forms the civil parish of Tyringham and Filgrave.
