= Sherington =

Village in Buckinghamshire, England

Coordinates: 52.108°N 0.704°W

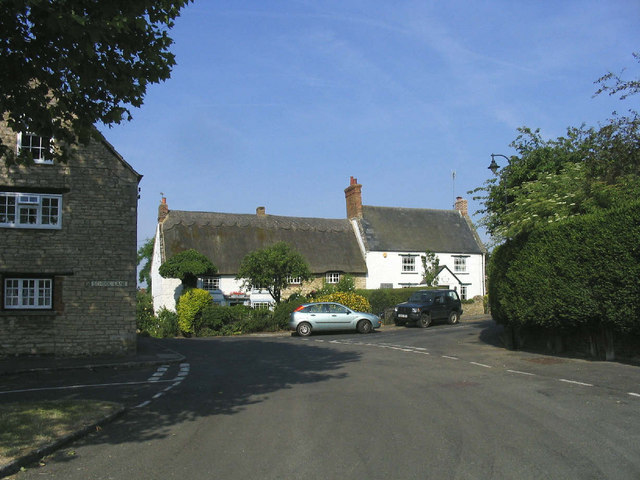
- Sherington.

- Location within Buckinghamshire
- Interactive map of Sherington
- Population: 985 (2021 census)
- OS grid reference: SP888463
- Civil parish: Sherington
- District: City of Milton Keynes
- Unitary authority: Milton Keynes City Council
- Ceremonial county: Buckinghamshire
- Region: South East
- Country: England
- Sovereign state: United Kingdom
- Post town: NEWPORT PAGNELL
- Postcode district: MK16
- Dialling code: 01908
- Police: Thames Valley
- Fire: Buckinghamshire
- Ambulance: South Central
- UK Parliament: Milton Keynes North

Sherington is a village and civil parish in the unitary authority area of the City of Milton Keynes, Buckinghamshire, England. It is located 2 miles (3.2 km) north-east of Newport Pagnell, and 5 miles (8.0 km) north-east of Central Milton Keynes, immediately to the west of the A509.

== History ==
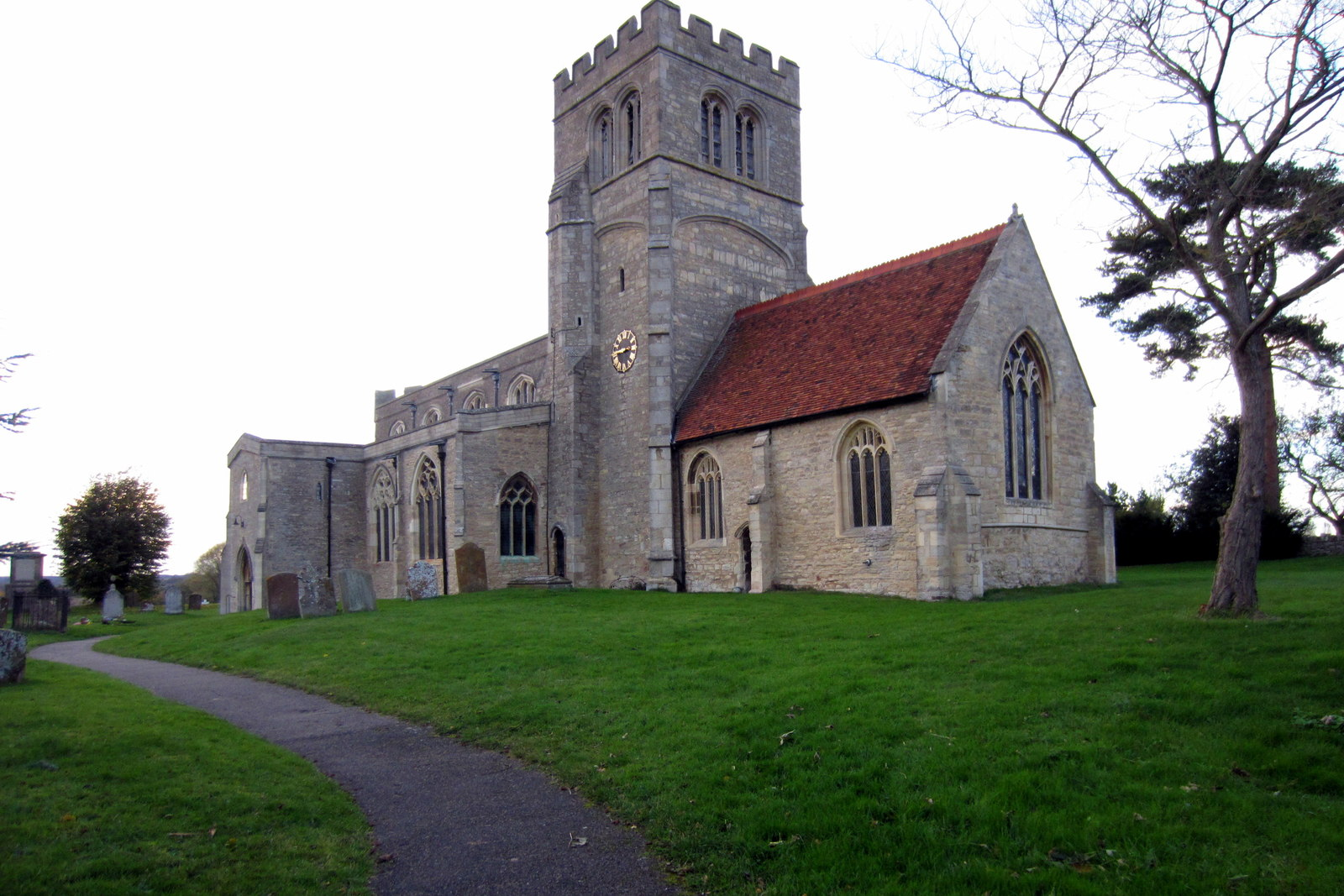
St Laud's church.

The village name is an Old English language word, and means 'Farm or settlement connected with Scira'. In the Domesday Book of 1086 the village was recorded as Serintone.

The parish church dates from the mid-13th century and is a Grade I listed building, dedicated to Saint Laud.

A bowl barrow (a prehistoric burial mound) at the eastern edge of the village is a scheduled monument.

=== Oxford and Cambridge University ===
On 14 February 1935, representatives of both the University of Oxford and University of Cambridge decided to meet at a spot equidistant between the two university cities, to put an end to the acrimonious relationship between them – metaphorically, to "bury the hatchet".

They chose Sherington’s Knoll, by the village pump at Sherington as being the location that satisfied their criterion.

A Latin prayer was read, then the four editors from the respective university magazines, namely Isis, Cherwell, Greensman and Granta read a speech. A dove of peace was released and water from the pump was washed over the university papers – to wash away the bitterness.

== Twin village ==
The village is twinned with Sameon in France.

== See also ==
- Adjacent civil parishes
  - North Crawley
  - Hardmead
  - Emberton
  - Lathbury
  - Newport Pagnell
