= Cold Brayfield =

Civil parish in the City of Milton Keynes, England

Coordinates: 52.161°N 0.642°W

- Location within Buckinghamshire
- Interactive map of Cold Brayfield
- Population: 90 (2021 census)
- OS grid reference: SP929523
- Civil parish: Cold Brayfield
- District: City of Milton Keynes
- Unitary authority: Milton Keynes City Council
- Ceremonial county: Buckinghamshire
- Region: South East
- Country: England
- Sovereign state: United Kingdom
- Post town: OLNEY
- Postcode district: MK46
- Dialling code: 01234
- Police: Thames Valley
- Fire: Buckinghamshire
- Ambulance: South Central
- UK Parliament: Milton Keynes North

Cold Brayfield is a village and civil parish in the unitary authority area of the City of Milton Keynes, Buckinghamshire, England. It is about 3 miles (4.8 km) east of Olney, 8 miles (13 km) west of Bedford, and 10 miles (16 km) north of Central Milton Keynes on the Bedfordshire border. Nearby places are Lavendon and Turvey (over the bridge on the Bedfordshire side of the River Great Ouse). It is in the civil parish of Newton Blossomville.

Cold Brayfield is probably the place named as 'Bragenfelda' in a charter of 967. The elements of the name, 'brain' and 'field' are interpreted to mean 'open country on the crown of a hill'. The village name is later recorded in twelfth- and thirteenth-century charters as 'Brauefeld', 'Brawefeld' or 'Brauufeld', and becomes 'Cold Brayfield' towards the end of the sixteenth century. The basis for the prefix 'Cold' is not recorded.

The Church of England parish church is dedicated to St Mary the Virgin.
