= Astwood, Buckinghamshire =

Village in the City of Milton Keynes, England

Coordinates: 52.1161°N 0.6105°W

Astwood
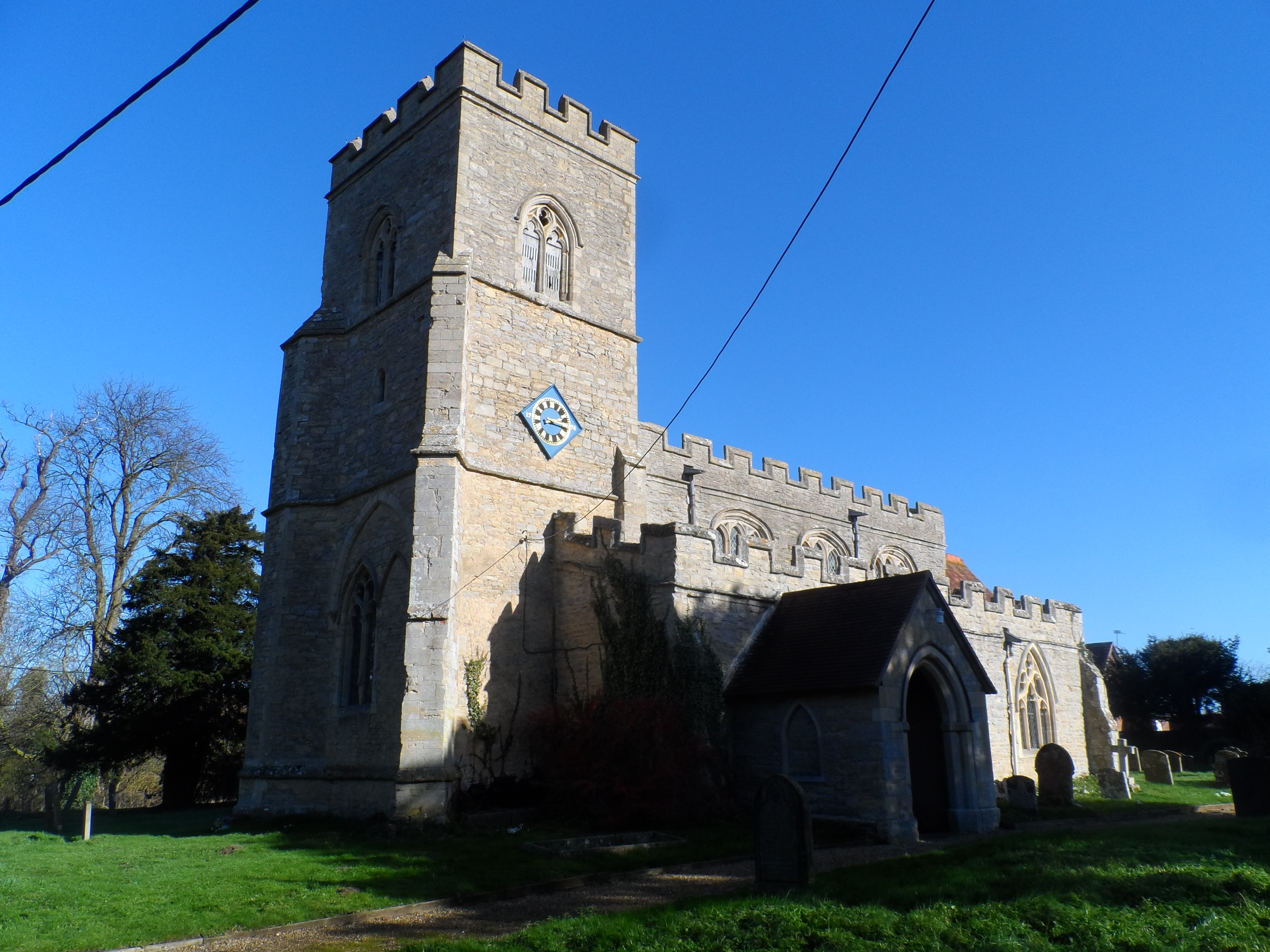
- St Peter's Church, Astwood

- Location within Buckinghamshire
- Interactive map of Astwood
- Population: 217 (2021 census)
- OS grid reference: SP951473
- Civil parish: Astwood
- Unitary authority: Milton Keynes City Council
- Ceremonial county: Buckinghamshire
- Region: South East
- Country: England
- Sovereign state: United Kingdom
- Post town: NEWPORT PAGNELL
- Postcode district: MK16
- Dialling code: 01234
- Police: Thames Valley
- Fire: Buckinghamshire
- Ambulance: South Central
- UK Parliament: Milton Keynes North

Astwood is a village and civil parish in the unitary authority area of the City of Milton Keynes, Buckinghamshire, England. It is located on the border with Bedfordshire, approximately 6 miles (9.7 km) east of Newport Pagnell, 7 miles (11 km) west of Bedford and 8 miles (13 km) north-east of Central Milton Keynes. In 2021 the parish had a population of 217.

The village name is Anglo-Saxon in origin and means "east wood".

== Buildings and landmarks ==
Most of the older buildings in the village have thatched roofs making for a quaint rural setting.

The churchyard of the parish church of St Peter is considered by some as being one of the prettiest in the county. The Grade II-listed church dates from 1154 and includes a 14th-century window, bells dating from the 15th and 17th centuries, and a clock installed in 1774. It was closed to public worship in 2015, and in 2025, the church was put up for sale with planning permission for conversion into a three-bedroom home.

== Astwood and Hardmead civil parish council ==
Together with the neighbouring parish of Hardmead, it has a joint parish council, Astwood and Hardmead. At the 2021 census, the component parishes were enumerated separately and had a combined population of 305.
