= Haversham =

Village in Buckinghamshire, England

Coordinates: 52.079°N 0.790°W

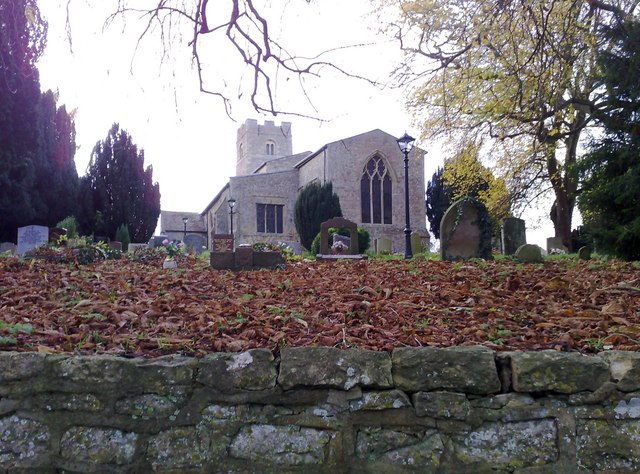
- Parish church of St Mary

- Location within Buckinghamshire
- Haversham-cum-Little Linford, pinpointing Haversham
- Population: 840 (Haversham-cum-Little Linford parish, 2021)
- OS grid reference: SP830430
- Civil parish: Haversham-cum-Little Linford
- District: City of Milton Keynes
- Unitary authority: Milton Keynes City Council
- Ceremonial county: Buckinghamshire
- Region: South East
- Country: England
- Sovereign state: United Kingdom
- Post town: Milton Keynes
- Postcode district: MK19
- Dialling code: 01908
- Police: Thames Valley
- Fire: Buckinghamshire
- Ambulance: South Central
- UK Parliament: Milton Keynes North

Haversham is a village in the civil parish of Haversham-cum-Little Linford, in the City of Milton Keynes unitary authority area, in Buckinghamshire, England. It is situated to the north of (and separated by the River Great Ouse from) the Milton Keynes urban area, near Wolverton and about 5 miles (8 km) north of Central Milton Keynes. As well as Haversham, the civil parish also includes Little Linford. At the 2021 census the civil parish had a population of 840.

== History ==
The village name is an Old English word that means 'Haefer's homestead'. In the Domesday Book of 1086, when it belonged to the Peverell family, it was listed as Havresham. The ancient manor house in the village, which was fortified in 1304, was largely burnt down, but parts of it still remain in a farm house just outside the main village.

Haversham was once a village of farm-workers' dwellings. As of 2012, only Hill Farm, Grange Farm and Crossroads Farm remain as active working farms. The village has two distinct settlements separated by farmland. The older part of the village contains the manor house. It lies at elevations between 60 metres and 65 metres above mean sea level, just above the flood plain of the Ouse. In the 1930s, 'New Haversham' was built nearer Wolverton, to house staff working at the Wolverton railway works nearby. New Haversham contains the primary school and is on ground at elevations between 65 metres and 75 metres, overlooking the Ouse Valley.

In the 1970s, the Amalgamated Roadstone Corporation dug the river meadows near the site of the old village of Stanton Low for gravel extraction, leaving behind the large man made lakes that surround Haversham to the south today. These lakes are the home to the Hanson Centre and to the Haversham Sailing Club, one of the sailing clubs around Milton Keynes.

Just south of Haversham beside the road to Wolverton, is the Wolverton Railway Viaduct over the valley of the river Great Ouse, designed by Robert Stephenson, carrying the West Coast Main Line.

The village gave its name to HMS Haversham, a Ham class minesweeper.

== Governance ==
There are two tiers of local government covering Haversham-cum-Little Linford, at parish and unitary authority level: Haversham-cum-Little Linford Parish Council and Milton Keynes City Council. The parish council generally meets at the Haversham Social and Community Centre.

Haversham was an ancient parish. From 1894 the parish of Haversham was included in the Newport Pagnell Rural District. In 1934 the parish was merged with the neighbouring parish of Little Linford to form a new civil parish called Haversham-cum-Little Linford. At the 1931 census (the last before the abolition of the parish) Haversham had a population of 164.

The new parish of Haversham-cum-Little Linford remained part of Newport Pagnell Rural District until the district's abolition in 1974, when the area became part of the new borough of Milton Keynes.

== Listed buildings and structures ==
The civil parish has one scheduled monument, one grade I listed building, two grade II* and nine grade II, including Wolverton Viaduct, an 1830s railway bridge.
