= Stoke Goldington =

Village in Buckinghamshire, England

Coordinates: 52.130°N 0.777°W

- Location within Buckinghamshire
- Interactive map of Stoke Goldington
- Population: 576 (2021 census)
- OS grid reference: SP838487
- Civil parish: Stoke Goldington
- District: City of Milton Keynes
- Unitary authority: Milton Keynes City Council
- Ceremonial county: Buckinghamshire
- Region: South East
- Country: England
- Sovereign state: United Kingdom
- Post town: NEWPORT PAGNELL
- Postcode district: MK16
- Dialling code: 01908
- Police: Thames Valley
- Fire: Buckinghamshire
- Ambulance: South Central
- UK Parliament: Milton Keynes North

Stoke Goldington is a village and civil parish in the unitary authority area of the City of Milton Keynes, Buckinghamshire, England. It is located about four miles NNW of Newport Pagnell, on the road to Northampton.

== History ==
The village name 'Stoke' derives from the Old English 'stoc', which means 'place'. It came to be used in the context of either a religious or a secondary settlement, and is one of the most common place name elements in England (see Stoke (disambiguation)). In the Domesday Book of 1086 the village was recorded as Stoche. The affix 'Goldington' came later and refers to "Peter de Goldington" (from Goldington in Bedfordshire) who held the manor in the early thirteenth century.

=== Listed buildings and structures ===
The parish has one grade I listed building, and 33 at grade II.

== Church of St Peter ==
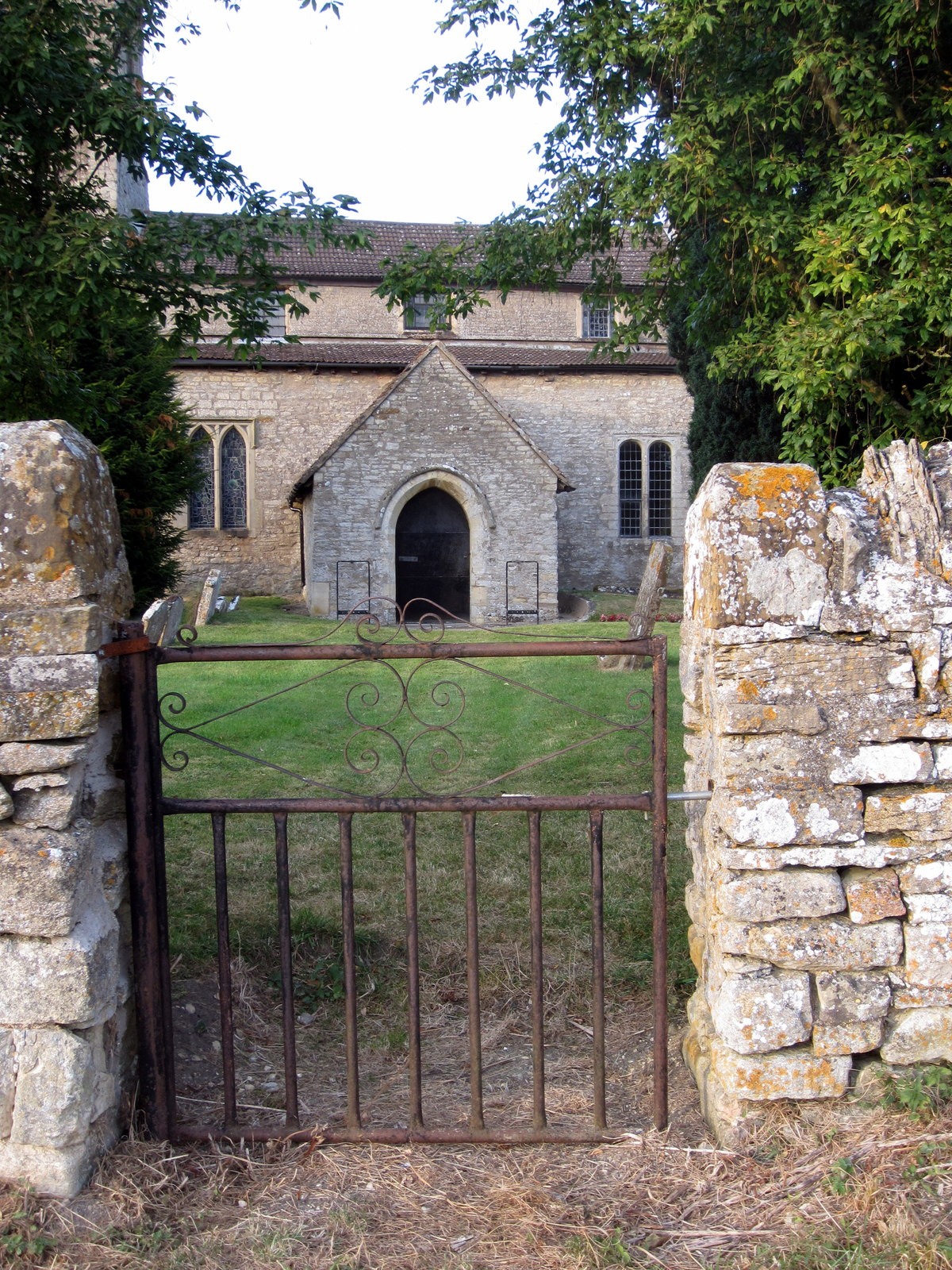
Gate to St Peter's

The parish church is dedicated to St Peter and is a grade I listed building. The earliest parts of the building date from the 12th century.

== Flooding ==
Stoke Goldington is susceptible to occasional flooding, and suffered badly in 2007 with repeated floods. Water settled up to 1.5 metres deep in places, requiring the evacuation of some of the population. Subsequently, contractors for Milton Keynes City Council installed measures to reduce the flood risk. In May 2018, there was another flood that generated 200 calls to the county Fire and Rescue service.
