= Gayhurst =

Civil parish in the City of Milton Keynes, England

Coordinates: 52.1122°N 0.7608°W

- Location within Buckinghamshire
- Interactive map of Gayhurst
- Population: 127 (2021 census)
- OS grid reference: SP849466
- Civil parish: Gayhurst
- District: City of Milton Keynes
- Unitary authority: Milton Keynes City Council
- Ceremonial county: Buckinghamshire
- Region: South East
- Country: England
- Sovereign state: United Kingdom
- Post town: NEWPORT PAGNELL
- Postcode district: MK16
- Dialling code: 01908
- Police: Thames Valley
- Fire: Buckinghamshire
- Ambulance: South Central
- UK Parliament: Milton Keynes North

Gayhurst is a village and civil parish in the unitary authority area of the City of Milton Keynes, Buckinghamshire, England. It is about 2.5 miles (4.0 km) NNW of Newport Pagnell, and 5 miles (8.0 km) north of Central Milton Keynes.

The village name is an Old English language word meaning 'wooded hill where goats are kept'. In the Domesday Book in 1086 it was recorded as Gateherst; later names include Goathurst. At that time the manor was owned by Bishop Odo of Bayeux.

== History ==
In 1582, Queen Elizabeth I made a grant of Gayhurst Manor "in the event of its reversion to the Crown" to Sir Francis Drake, but there is no record that he ever received it. The house once belonged to Sir Everard Digby (1578–1606), one of the conspirators in the Gunpowder Plot of 1605. His son, Sir Kenelm Digby (1603–1665), was an English courtier, diplomat, natural philosopher and astrologer. He was born at Gayhurst.

Gayhurst had an outstation from the Bletchley Park codebreaking establishment, where one of the Bombes used to decode German Enigma messages in World War Two were housed.

=== Listed buildings and structures ===
The parish has two buildings listed at Grade I, five at Grade II* and 20 at grade II. The (Grade I listed) Church of St Peter was built in the classical style in 1728 to replace a medieval church; the designer is unknown.
