= Clifton Reynes =

Civil parish in the City of Milton Keynes, England

Coordinates: 52.152°N 0.682°W

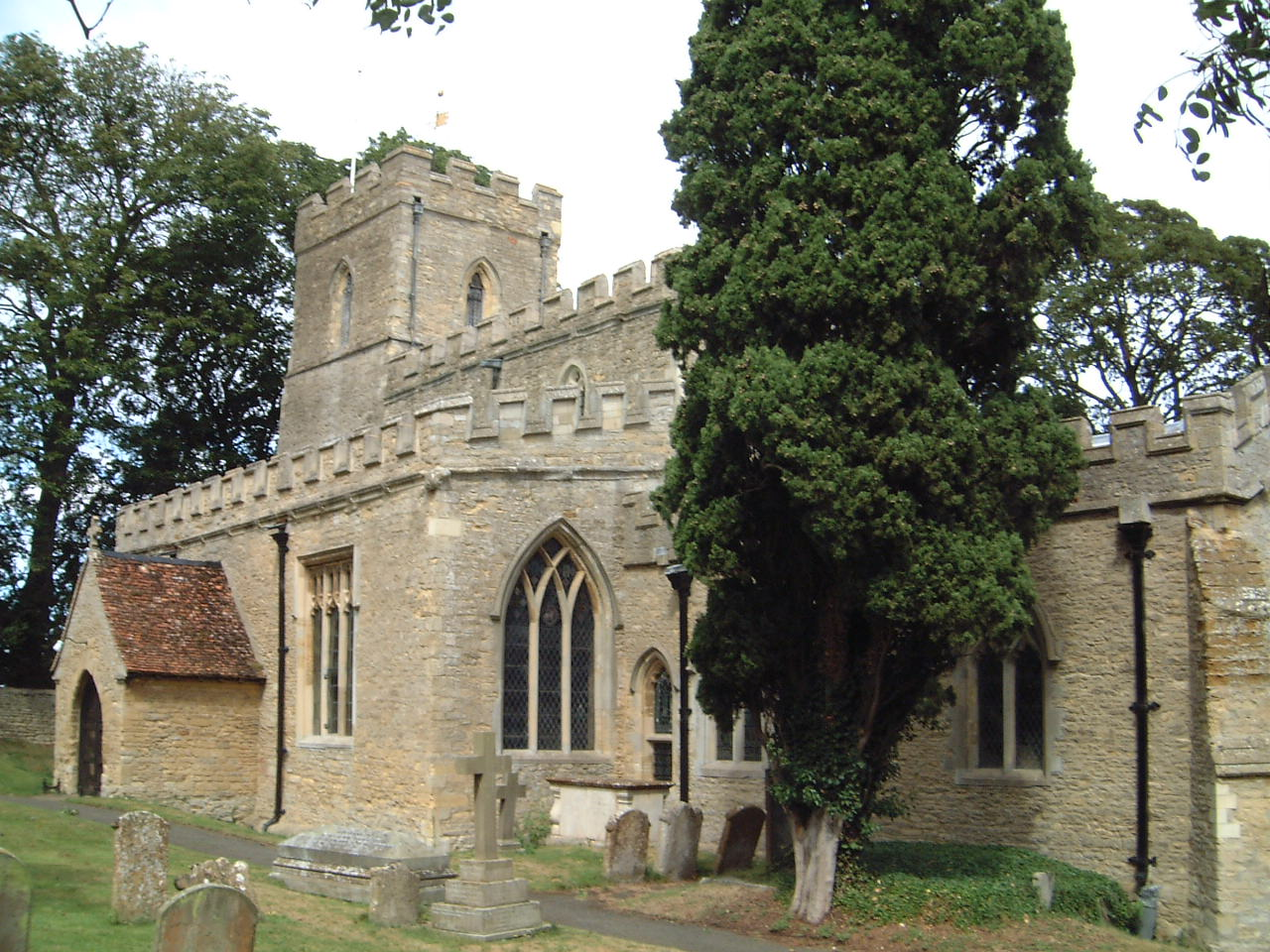
- St Mary's Church, Clifton Reynes

- Location within Buckinghamshire
- Interactive map of Clifton Reynes
- Population: 150 (2021 census)
- OS grid reference: SP903513
- Civil parish: Clifton Reynes
- District: City of Milton Keynes
- Unitary authority: Milton Keynes City Council
- Ceremonial county: Buckinghamshire
- Region: South East
- Country: England
- Sovereign state: United Kingdom
- Post town: OLNEY
- Postcode district: MK46
- Dialling code: 01234
- Police: Thames Valley
- Fire: Buckinghamshire
- Ambulance: South Central
- UK Parliament: Milton Keynes North

Clifton Reynes is a village and civil parish in the unitary authority area of the City of Milton Keynes, Buckinghamshire, England. It is about a mile east of Olney. It shares a joint parish council with Newton Blossomville. It is situated roughly 8 miles (13 km) north of Central Milton Keynes and 9 miles (14 km) west of Bedford.

== Extent ==
It is bounded, on the North, by the River Great Ouse, by which this parish is separated from Lavendon and Cold Brayfield; on the East, by Newton-Blossomville; on the South, by Petsoe and Emberton; and on the West, by the latter and by Olney.

== Origin of name ==
The village name comes in two parts: the former name 'Clifton' is Anglo Saxon in origin and means 'Cliff farm', referring to the village's position on a cliff on a bank of the River Ouse. The latter name 'Reynes' refers to the ancient lords of the manor of the village, whose family name this was. In the Domesday Book of 1086 Clifton Reynes was recorded as Cliftone.

== Church of St Mary the Virgin ==
The parish church dedicated to St Mary is (unusually for a Buckinghamshire church) completely castellated: even the gables are embattled. The tower is thought to be Norman; however, the top is later probably 14th century. The majority of the building is of the 13th, 14th and 15th centuries and the nave is unusually tall. Features of interest include the 14th-century font and the medieval monuments of the Reynes family. These include two pairs of wooden effigies; one pair is of Ralph and Annabel de Reynes (ca. 1320–30) and the other is unidentified and slightly earlier.

The building is Grade I listed.
