= Weston Underwood, Buckinghamshire =

Village and civil parish

Coordinates: 52.147°N 0.736°W

Weston Underwood
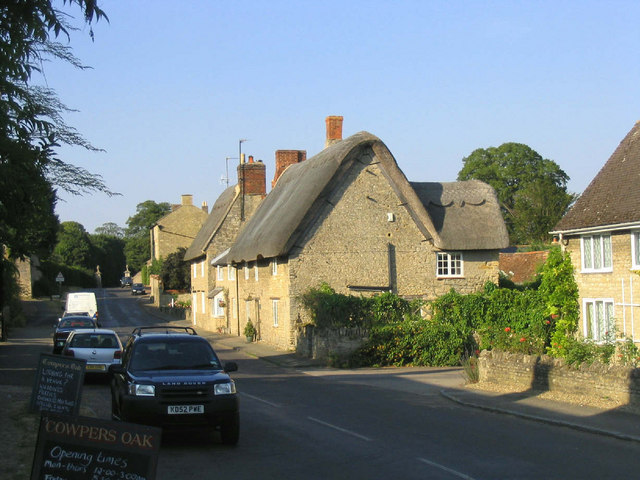

- Location within Buckinghamshire
- Interactive map of Weston Underwood
- Population: 230 (2021 census)
- OS grid reference: SP865506
- District: City of Milton Keynes
- Unitary authority: Milton Keynes City Council
- Ceremonial county: Buckinghamshire
- Region: South East
- Country: England
- Sovereign state: United Kingdom
- Post town: OLNEY
- Postcode district: MK46
- Dialling code: 01234
- Police: Thames Valley
- Fire: Buckinghamshire
- Ambulance: South Central
- UK Parliament: Milton Keynes North

Weston Underwood is a village and civil parish in the unitary authority area of the City of Milton Keynes, Buckinghamshire, England. It is located about a mile west of Olney.

The village name 'Weston' is Anglo Saxon in origin, and means 'western estate', possibly referring to the situation of the village in relation to Olney. The affix 'Underwood' refers to the village's location to a nearby forest, probably the Yardley Chase and Whittlewood Forest.

== Parish church of St Lawrence ==
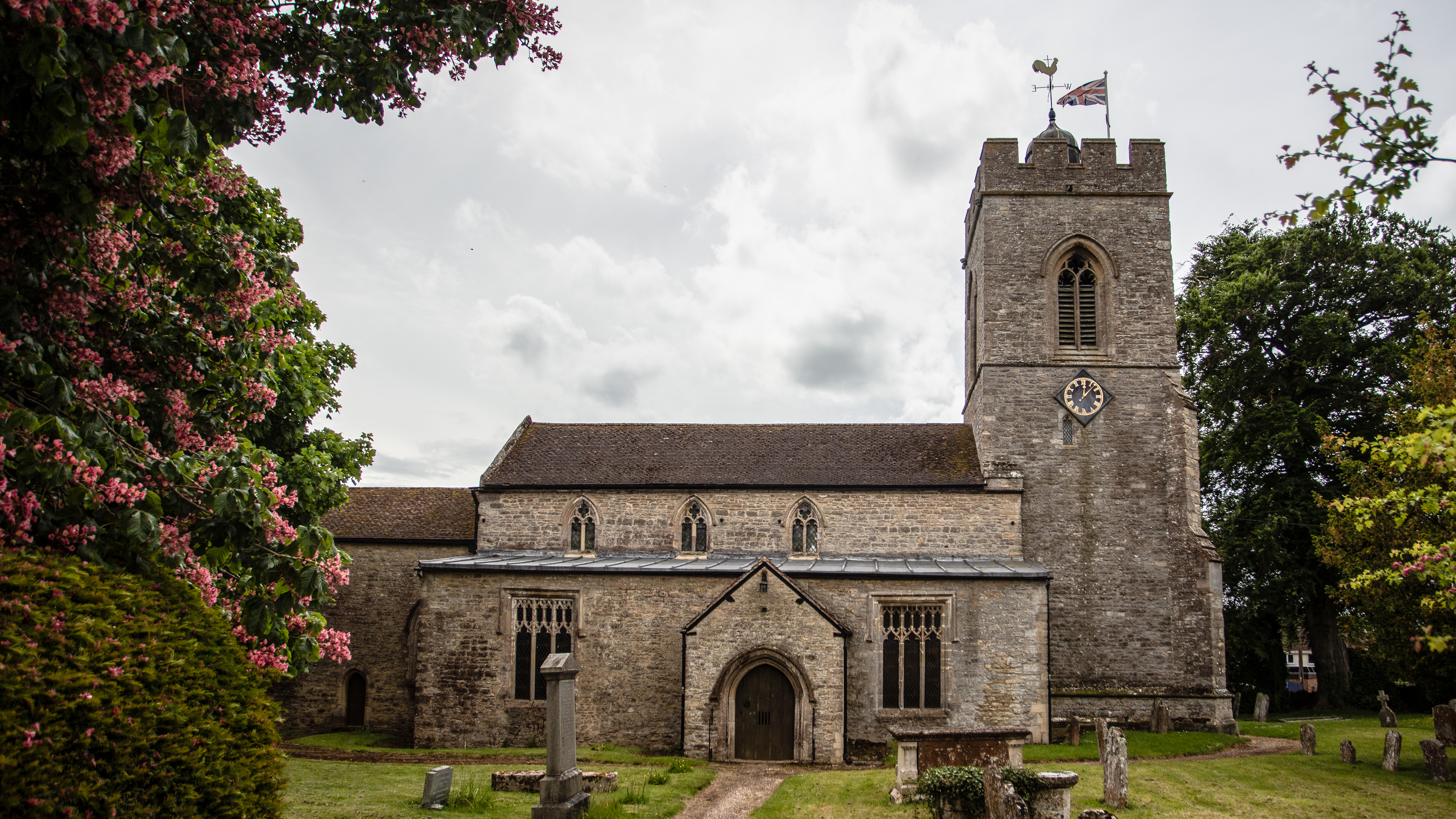
Parish church of St Lawrence

The parish church of St Lawrence is a Grade I listed building, dating from the 12th to the 15th century.

== History ==
=== William Cowper ===
The hymnodist William Cowper lived in the village from 1786 to 1795.. His name has been given to a number of places there.

=== 1858 coin hoard at Weston Underwood ===
On New Year's Eve, 1858, an earthenware vessel was found in "Whites Close" (grid reference SP8520052000, near Weston Lodge). It contained 166 denarii from the 1st and 2nd century AD and four Legionary coins. Also found was a complete 2nd century Samian bowl and other pieces of pottery, including many broken sherds, and even human and horse bones. The Samian bowl now resides at Buckinghamshire County Museum.

== See also ==
- Weston Underwood, Derbyshire
