= Chicheley =

Civil parish in the Borough of Milton Keynes, England

Coordinates: 52.1026°N 0.6835°W

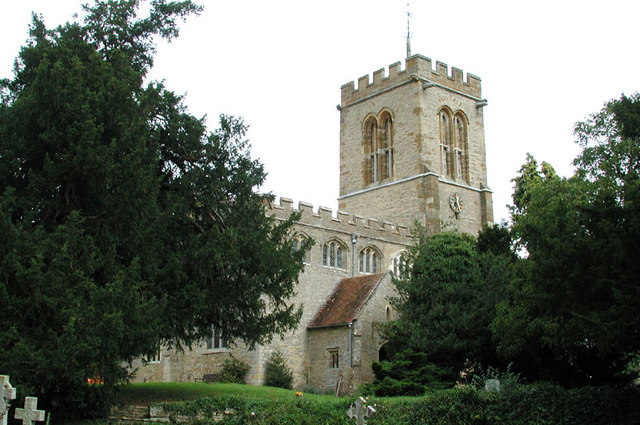
- St Lawrence's Church, Chicheley

- Location within Buckinghamshire
- Interactive map of Chicheley
- Population: 91 (2021 census)
- OS grid reference: SP902459
- Civil parish: Chicheley
- District: City of Milton Keynes
- Unitary authority: Milton Keynes City Council
- Ceremonial county: Buckinghamshire
- Region: South East
- Country: England
- Sovereign state: United Kingdom
- Post town: NEWPORT PAGNELL
- Postcode district: MK16, MK46
- Dialling code: 01908
- Police: Thames Valley
- Fire: Buckinghamshire
- Ambulance: South Central
- UK Parliament: Milton Keynes North

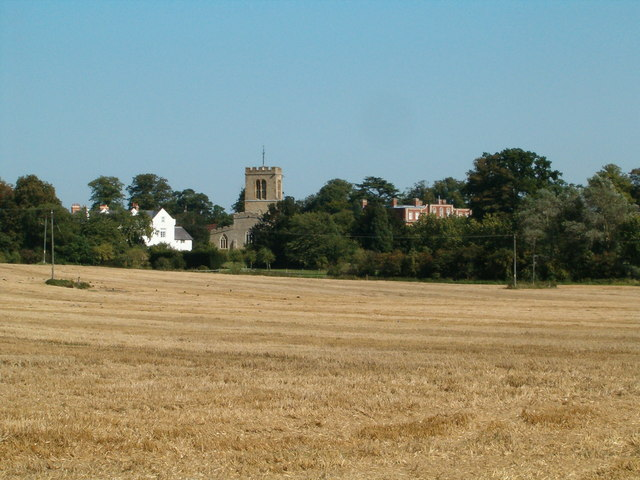
Chicheley

Chicheley is a village and civil parish in the unitary authority area of the City of Milton Keynes, Buckinghamshire, England. The village is about 2.5 miles (4 km) north-east of Newport Pagnell, and 5 miles (8.0 km) north-east of Central Milton Keynes.

The village name is Anglo-Saxon in origin, and means Cicca's clearing. In the Domesday Book of 1086, the village was recorded as Cicelai.

The manor of Chicheley (which some suggest may have once been called Thickthorn) anciently belonged to the Pagnell family of Newport Pagnell, but was given by them to the church. Through this connection the village also at one time belonged to Cardinal Wolsey, though only until his forced resignation by King Henry VIII who took all his possessions from him at that time.

During the English Civil War, the manor, belonging to the Chester family, received some considerable damage, associated as it was with the garrison at Newport Pagnell. Following the civil war, the manor was demolished, and the present Chicheley Hall built on the site. All that remains of the old manor today is one Jacobean over-mantel with termini caryatids, and some panelling in the 'new' Chicheley Hall.

The parish church is dedicated to St Lawrence and has a Perpendicular style central tower with large windows. The chancel, which contains a fine plaster depicting floral wreaths in relief, and a stone reredos, was rebuilt c. 1708; however, the church dates from the 14th century. In the nave are raised box pews, giving a theatrical air. The church contains monuments to Anthony Cave. Cave's sarcophagus is a cadaver tomb. Other monuments dating from 1635 are to the Chester family of Chicheley Hall.

== Listed buildings and structures ==
The village has a listed park (Chicheley Hall gardens, II*), two buildings or structures listed at Grade I (Chicheley Hall, the Church of St Lawrence ), three at Grade II* (Dovecote south of Chicheley Hall, Stable block southwest of Chicheley Hall, Service wing with attached quadrant link northwest of Chicheley Hall ) and a further 16 at Grade II.
