= Tyringham =

Village in Buckinghamshire, England

Coordinates: 52.114°N 0.745°W

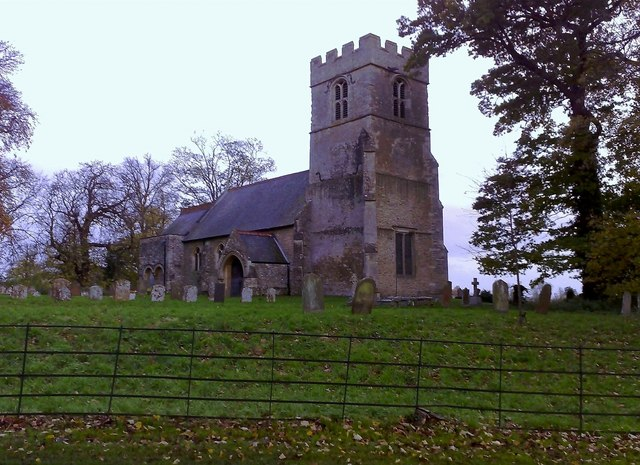
- St. Peter's, Tyringham

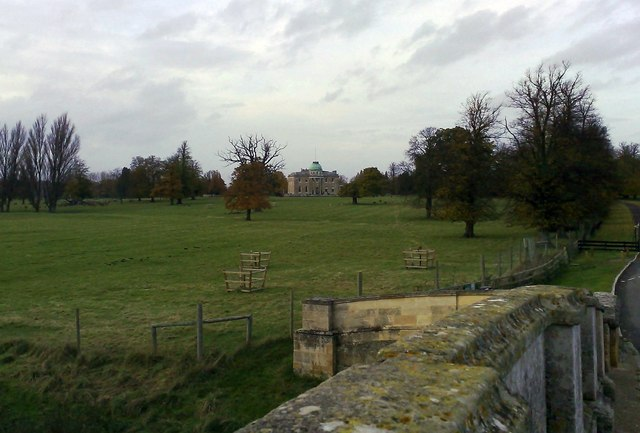
- Tyringham Hall and Park

- Location within Buckinghamshire
- Tyringham and Filgrave parish outline, Tyringham pinpointed
- Population: 225 (2021 census, Tyringham and Filgrave)
- OS grid reference: SP859469
- Civil parish: Tyringham and Filgrave
- District: City of Milton Keynes
- Unitary authority: Milton Keynes City Council
- Ceremonial county: Buckinghamshire
- Region: South East
- Country: England
- Sovereign state: United Kingdom
- Post town: NEWPORT PAGNELL
- Postcode district: MK16
- Dialling code: 01908
- Police: Thames Valley
- Fire: Buckinghamshire
- Ambulance: South Central
- UK Parliament: Milton Keynes North

Tyringham (/ˈtiːrɪŋəm/) is a village in the unitary authority area of the City of Milton Keynes, Buckinghamshire, England. It is located about a mile and a half north of Newport Pagnell.

The village name is an Old English language word, and means 'Tir's home'. In the Domesday Book of 1086 the village was recorded as Telingham.

There is a theory that the name Tyringham refers to a settlement of Thuringii Germans coming with the Anglo-Saxons in the Dark Ages.

== Civil parish ==
Historically, the parish of 'Tyringham with Filgrave' (or 'Tyringham cum Filgrave') was first created in 1639 by the union of two parishes.

The modern civil parish is Tyringham and Filgrave, consisting of these two villages and their surrounding area. At the 2021 census, the population of the parish was 225. Historically, Tyringham on its own once contained only two houses, but was deemed a village in its own right because it had an ecclesiastic parish.

== See also ==
- Tyringham Hall
- Tyringham, Massachusetts

== Bibliography ==
- Victoria County History, Buckinghamshire, vol.4, Tyringham
