= Castlethorpe =

Civil parish in the City of Milton Keynes, England

Coordinates: 52.093°N 0.840°W

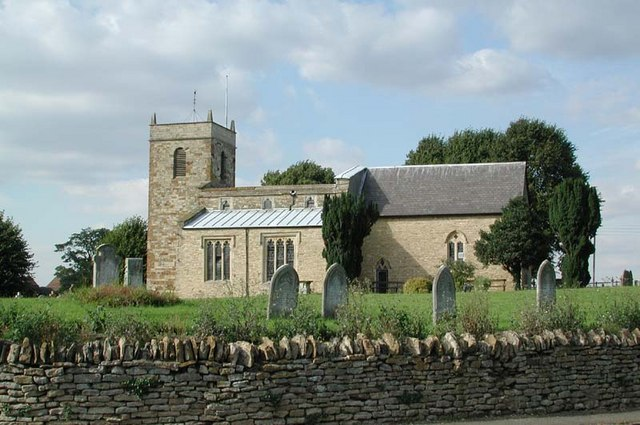
- Parish church of St Simon and St Jude

- Location within Buckinghamshire
- Interactive map of Castlethorpe
- Population: 1,103 (2021 census)
- OS grid reference: SP795445
- Civil parish: Castlethorpe
- District: City of Milton Keynes
- Unitary authority: Milton Keynes City Council
- Ceremonial county: Buckinghamshire
- Region: South East
- Country: England
- Sovereign state: United Kingdom
- Post town: MILTON KEYNES
- Postcode district: MK19
- Dialling code: 01908
- Police: Thames Valley
- Fire: Buckinghamshire
- Ambulance: South Central
- UK Parliament: Milton Keynes North

Castlethorpe is a village and civil parish with a population of about 1,000 in the unitary authority area of the City of Milton Keynes, Buckinghamshire, England. It is about 3 miles (4.8 km) north-east of Stony Stratford, 4 miles (6.4 km) north-west of Newport Pagnell and 7 miles (11 km) north of Central Milton Keynes. It is separated from the county of Northamptonshire by the River Tove.

== History ==
The village is relatively more recent than those around it, and it started out in life as a castle belonging to the lord of the manor of nearby Hanslope.

A settlement of servants and manual workers grew up around the castle and this became the village of Castlethorpe (thorpe is an Old Norse language (particularly Danish) word for homestead, and it is not unreasonable to assume that there may well have been a Danish settlement nearby as the area was, if not part of, certainly close to, the Danelaw). The castle was damaged in 1215 in a feud between Foulkes de Brent – who had been sent by King John – and William Mauduit, the castle's owner. Mauduit was reputedly in rebellion against the King. Although Mauduit returned to claim his seat after the King's death, the castle was demolished shortly afterward. All that is left today are the grassy mounds of the former Motte-and-Bailey castle.

Multi-dwelling fires in the village have been reported in local media, notably those of 1899 and especially 1905 (when 13 cottages were destroyed, leaving 36 people homeless).

=== Listed buildings and structures ===
The parish has one scheduled monument (Castlethorpe Castle), one grade I listed building (the Church of St Simon and St Jude), and twenty grade II.

== Ecclesiastic parish ==
Church of St Simon and St Jude, the parish church, is dedicated to St Simon and St Jude, and possibly dates back to Anglo-Saxon times: although no evidence of a pre-Norman building survives, its existence has been conjectured from the structure of the north arcade. In 1350, the nave was widened and the chancel rebuilt. The church at Castlethorpe was originally superior to that of Hanslope but Bishop Grosteste changed the precedence in about 1250. Castlethorpe has grown up around the church and some traditional old stone cottages at the centre of the village which is designated a conservation area.

== Rail and canal ==
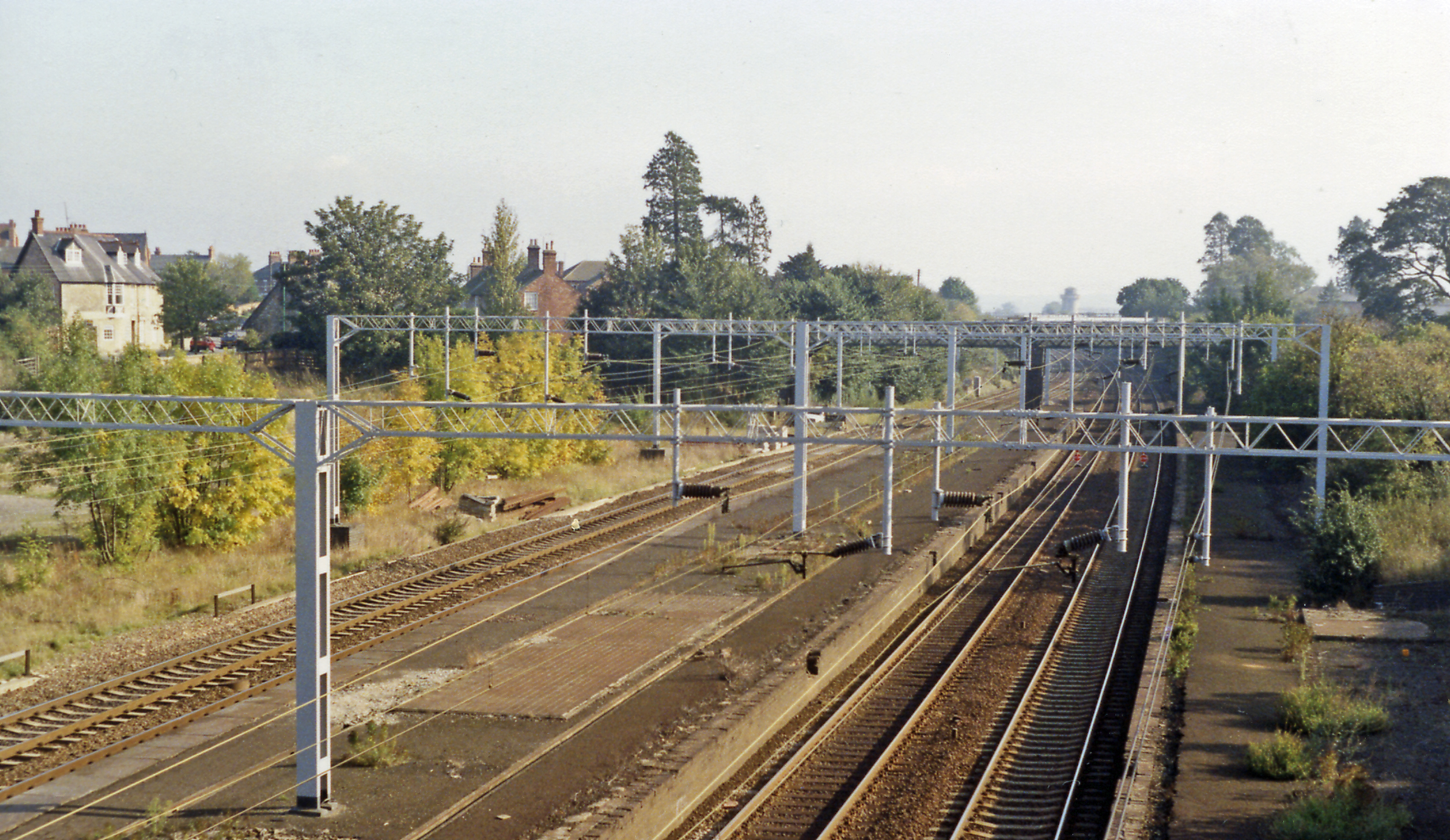
Site of the station looking south towards London (Northampton Loop lines on the left)

The West Coast Main Line runs alongside the west side of Castlethorpe, and the village had its own railway station until September 1964 when, to the outrage of the village, it was closed down.

The Grand Union Canal also runs by on the outskirts of the village, and it is a short walk along the towpath to the neighbouring village of Cosgrove in Northamptonshire.
