= Ravenstone, Buckinghamshire =

Village in Buckinghamshire, England

Coordinates: 52.1492°N 0.7642°W

Ravenstone
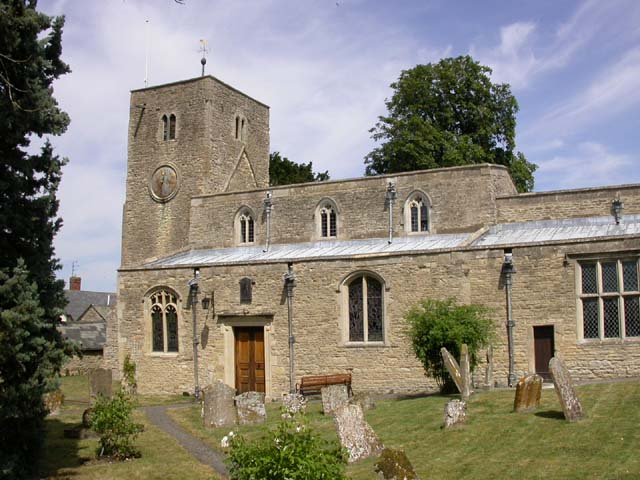
- All Saints' parish church

- Location within Buckinghamshire
- Interactive map of Ravenstone
- Population: 236 (2021 census)
- OS grid reference: SP850508
  - London: 60 miles (97 km)
- District: City of Milton Keynes
- Unitary authority: Milton Keynes City Council
- Ceremonial county: Buckinghamshire
- Region: South East
- Country: England
- Sovereign state: United Kingdom
- Post town: Olney
- Postcode district: MK46
- Dialling code: 01908
- Police: Thames Valley
- Fire: Buckinghamshire
- Ambulance: South Central
- UK Parliament: Milton Keynes North

Ravenstone is a village and civil parish in the unitary authority area of the City of Milton Keynes, Buckinghamshire, England. The village is about 2.5 miles (4 km) west of Olney, and 4 miles (6.4 km) north of Newport Pagnell and about 10 miles (16 km) from Central Milton Keynes.

== History ==
The toponym is derived from the Old English for "Hrafn's farm".

In 1255 a priory of Augustinian canons was founded in Ravenstone by King Henry III. It was dissolved in 1525 and its lands granted to Cardinal Wolsey; and then in 1544 the Crown seized all of Wolsey's estates including Ravenstone Priory. After changing hands privately a number of occasions, the building was eventually demolished, and today nothing remains standing.

The oldest parts of the Church of England parish church of All Saints are 11th-century. The church includes the tomb of Heneage Finch, 1st Earl of Nottingham. He had the neighbouring almshouses built, originally six for men and six for women, now combined into six cottages. The original inhabitants had to be single and members of the Church of England, and received a small pension, firewood, and a new cloak every Christmas.

=== Scheduled monuments and listed buildings ===
The parish has one scheduled monument (Ravenstone Priory), one grade I listed building (the Church of All Saints) and a further 29 buildings or structured listed at. grade II.

== Amenities ==
The only communal facility in Ravenstone is the village hall. A post office and The Wheatsheaf pub closed in the early 1990s.

== Sources and further reading ==
- Knight, E; Osborn, G (1992). Olney and District in Camera. Buckingham: Quotes Ltd. p. 72.
- Page, W.H., ed. (1927). "Parishes : Ravenstone". A History of the County of Buckingham. Victoria County History. Vol. 4. London: The St Katherine Press. pp. 439–445.
- Pevsner, Nikolaus (1960). Buckinghamshire. The Buildings of England. Harmondsworth: Penguin Books. pp. 230–231. ISBN 0-14-071019-1.
