= Lathbury =

Village in Buckinghamshire, England

Coordinates: 52.0999°N 0.7211°W

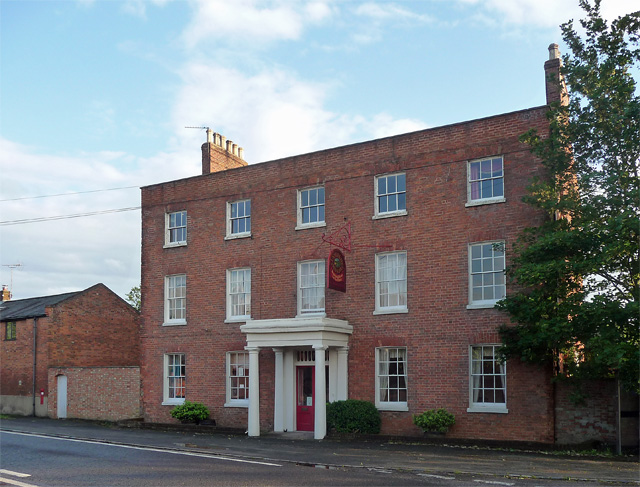
- Lathbury Manor

- Location within Buckinghamshire
- Interactive map of Lathbury
- Population: 143 (2021 census)
- OS grid reference: SP876452
- Civil parish: Lathbury
- District: City of Milton Keynes
- Unitary authority: Milton Keynes City Council
- Ceremonial county: Buckinghamshire
- Region: South East
- Country: England
- Sovereign state: United Kingdom
- Post town: NEWPORT PAGNELL
- Postcode district: MK16
- Dialling code: 01908
- Police: Thames Valley
- Fire: Buckinghamshire
- Ambulance: South Central
- UK Parliament: Milton Keynes North

Lathbury is a village and civil parish in the City of Milton Keynes, Buckinghamshire, England. It is about 1 km north of Newport Pagnell, on the opposite side of the River Great Ouse, and about 8 km (5 miles) north-east of Central Milton Keynes. A meander of the River Great Ouse almost surrounds the village and parish, and the Ouse Valley Way passes through the parish.

== History ==
The village name is an Old English language word, meaning "fortification built with laths or beams". In the Domesday Book of 1086 the village was listed as Latesberie.

On the Dissolution of the Monasteries, the advowson of Latbbury Abbey was given to the Dean and Chapter of Christ Church, Oxford. The manor of Lathbury, and Lathbury Park house, has descended through various families, including Lord Vaux, the Earl of Essex and the Andrews baronets. The current Lathbury Park is a Grade II listed house dating from 1801, and incorporating elements from the earlier manor house.

There was also once a 'free school' in a chapel in the churchyard, founded in the reign of Queen Elizabeth I, leased to the schoolmaster by Christ Church. The school was pulled down in 1698 and its materials used to repair the ancient rectory.

The parish church, All Saints' Church, is a Grade I listed building, of 12th-century origin.
