= Newton Blossomville =

Village in Buckinghamshire, England

Coordinates: 52.154°N 0.649°W

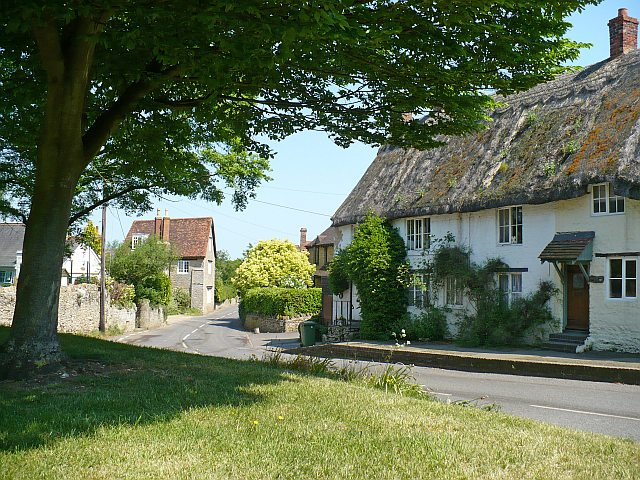

- Location within Buckinghamshire
- Interactive map of Newton Blossomville
- Population: 229 (2021 census)
- OS grid reference: SP925515
- Civil parish: Newton Blossomville
- District: City of Milton Keynes
- Unitary authority: Milton Keynes City Council
- Ceremonial county: Buckinghamshire
- Region: South East
- Country: England
- Sovereign state: United Kingdom
- Post town: BEDFORD
- Postcode district: MK43
- Dialling code: 01234
- Police: Thames Valley
- Fire: Buckinghamshire
- Ambulance: South Central
- UK Parliament: Milton Keynes North

Newton Blossomville is a village in the unitary authority area of the City of Milton Keynes, Buckinghamshire, England. It is a civil parish, sharing a joint parish council with Clifton Reynes.

It is located in the north of the Borough, about 2.5 miles (4.0 km) east of Olney, 8 miles (13 km) west of Bedford, and 9 miles (14 km) north-east of Central Milton Keynes, close to the Bucks/Beds border.

== History ==
The village name 'Newton' is an Old English language word meaning 'new village' or 'new homestead'. It was recorded in the Domesday Book of 1086 under the holdings of Clifton Reynes (Clystone) as not much was left of the original settlement. Called 'Neutone' when first named independently in 1175, it gained the affix 'Blossevill', referring to the family name of the lords of the manor in the 13th century.

In 1419, it appears as "Newenton Blosumvyll".

=== Listed buildings and structures ===
The parish has one scheduled monument, one grade II* listed building, and 14 at grade II.

== Services ==
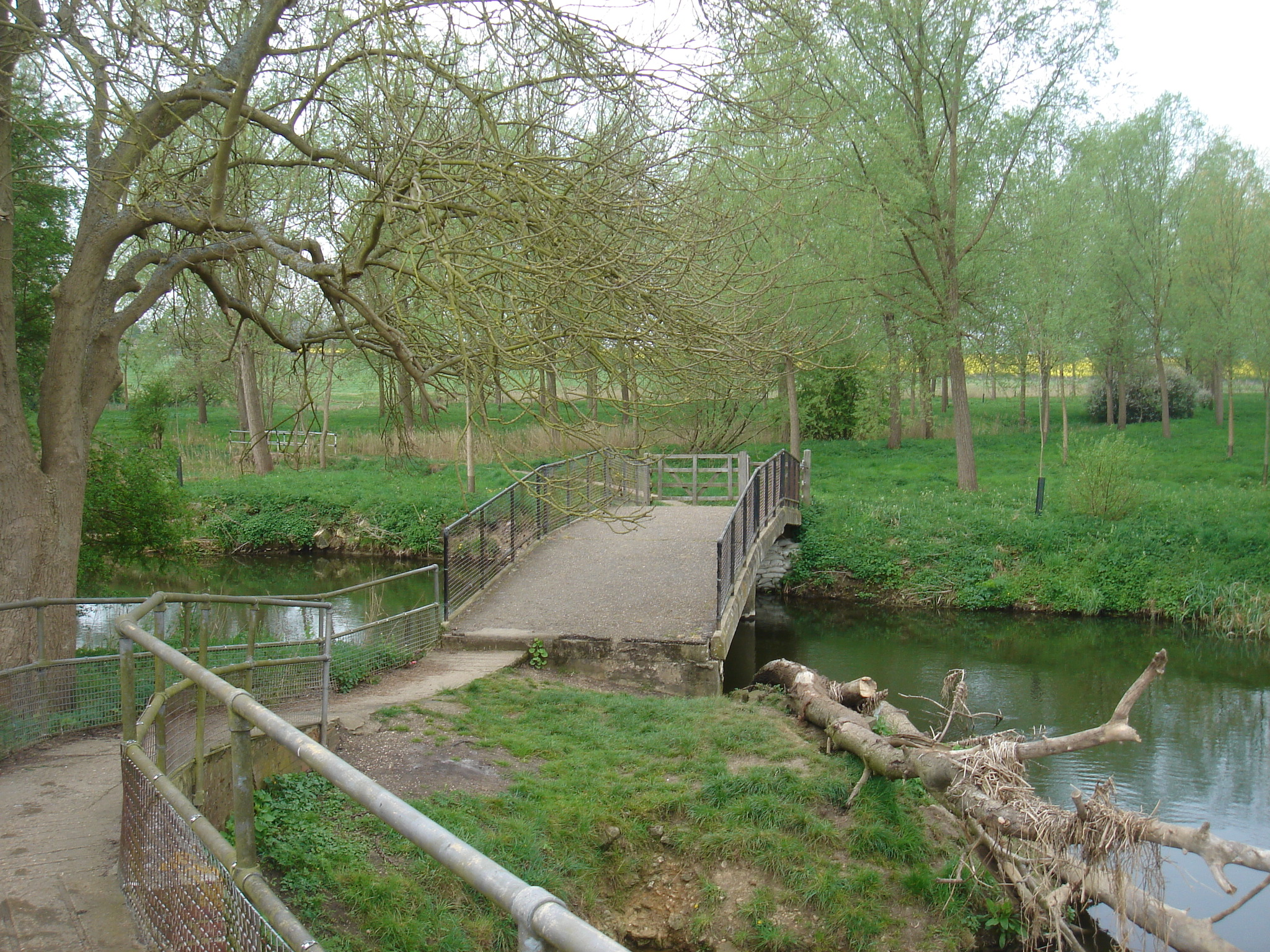
The Bridge over the River Great Ouse, north-east of the village

Today, the only service remaining in the village is the Newton Blossomville Church of England First School. The village post office has been closed for many years, as is common for other villages of this size. The nearest railway station, Turvey, was closed when the Bedford to Northampton Line was closed in the 1960s. For a brief time the new diesel engines were tested along the railway. Some of the line remains but much is unused and overgrown or incorporated into the adjacent fields. Although, a section is used as private access to Newton Lodge Farm in Spring Lane, Clifton Reynes, coming off Clifton Road, to the west of the remains of the Clifton Road railway bridge, where once a track with a railway crossing used to run to "Costerpits Farm" (now a residential barn conversion).

== Notable former inhabitants ==
- Rosemary Rapaport – British violinist (1918–2011)
- Sir Thomas Armstrong – British musician (1898–1994)

== Sources ==
- Page, William, ed. (1927). "Parishes : Newton Blossomville". A History of the County of Buckingham. Victoria History of the Counties of England. Vol. 4. London: Constable & Co. Ltd. pp. 422–425.
