= Hardmead =

Village in the City of Milton Keynes, England

Coordinates: 52.1178°N 0.6363°W

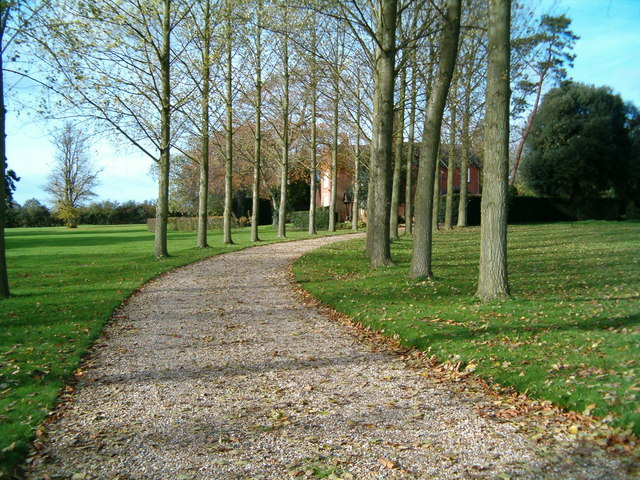
- Hardmead Rectory

- Location within Buckinghamshire
- Interactive map of Hardmead
- Population: 88 (2021 census)
- OS grid reference: SP935476
- Civil parish: Hardmead
- Unitary authority: Milton Keynes
- Ceremonial county: Buckinghamshire
- Region: South East
- Country: England
- Sovereign state: United Kingdom
- Post town: NEWPORT PAGNELL
- Postcode district: MK16
- Dialling code: 01234
- Police: Thames Valley
- Fire: Buckinghamshire
- Ambulance: South Central
- UK Parliament: Milton Keynes North

Hardmead is a small village and civil parish in the unitary authority area of the City of Milton Keynes, Buckinghamshire, England. It is in the north of the borough, about 7.5 miles (12.1 km) west of Bedford, 7 miles (11 km) north-east of Central Milton Keynes and 5 miles (8.0 km) north east of Newport Pagnell. The village is close to the A422 road, on a very small road linking that to nearby Newton Blossomville. Together with the neighbouring village of Astwood, it forms the civil parish of Astwood and Hardmead.

The village name is Old English in origin, and means 'Heoruwulf's meadow'. In the Domesday Book of 1086 it was called Herulfmede. The village is very small with a population of around 100 people. The nearest pub is located one mile away in Astwood and the nearest shop is about four miles distant.

== Astwood and Hardmead civil parish council ==
Together with the neighbouring parish of Hardmead, it has a joint parish council, Astwood and Hardmead. At the 2021 census, the component parishes were enumerated separately and had a combined population of 305.

== Church of St Mary ==
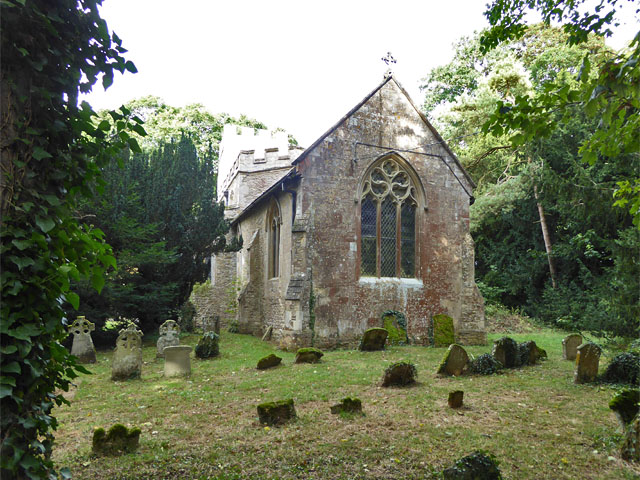
Former church of St Mary's Hardmead

The former church of St Mary's Hardmead is Grade I listed and parts date from the 12th century. It has been redundant since the 1980s and is now in the care of the charity Friends of Friendless Churches. There are monuments in the church to the Catesby family and to the explorer Robert Shedden.

== Scheduled monument ==
The parish has a scheduled monument, a medieval "moated site 410m south east of Maukins" (at SP 94125 48121).
