= North Crawley =

Village in Buckinghamshire, England

Coordinates: 52.093°N 0.65°W

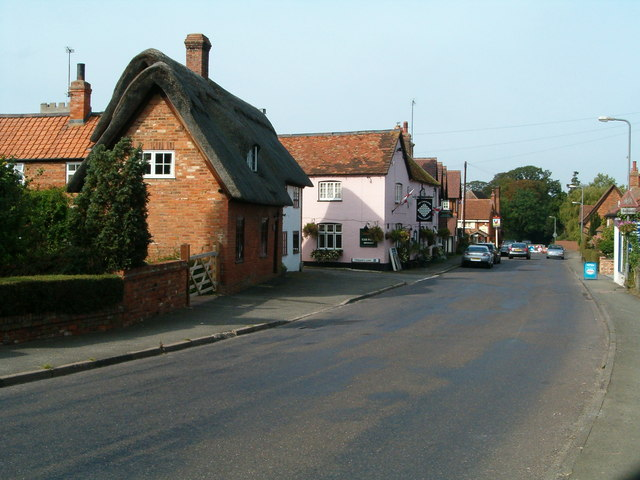
- North Crawley village centre

- Location within Buckinghamshire
- Interactive map of North Crawley
- Population: 723 (2021 census)
- OS grid reference: SP925447
- Civil parish: North Crawley
- District: City of Milton Keynes
- Unitary authority: Milton Keynes City Council
- Ceremonial county: Buckinghamshire
- Region: South East
- Country: England
- Sovereign state: United Kingdom
- Post town: NEWPORT PAGNELL
- Postcode district: MK16
- Dialling code: 01234
- Police: Thames Valley
- Fire: Buckinghamshire
- Ambulance: South Central
- UK Parliament: Milton Keynes North

North Crawley is a village and civil parish in the unitary authority area of the City of Milton Keynes, Buckinghamshire, England. It is located near the border with Bedfordshire, about 3.5 miles (5.6 km) east of Newport Pagnell, and 6 miles (9.7 km) north-east of Central Milton Keynes.

The village name 'Crawley' is an Old English language word, and means 'clearing frequented by crows'. In the Domesday Book of 1086 the village was referred to as Crauelai. In manorial records in 1197 the area was split into Great Crawley and Little Crawley. The prefix 'North' was added sometime in the 15th century. (Note: as "North Crolye") Local speculation has it that the prefix was added to distinguish the village from the town of Crawley in West Sussex but supporting historical evidence remains unlikely to be found. The hamlet of Little Crawley still exists under that name.

Anciently North Crawley was the location of a monastery dedicated to Saint Firmin. The monastery was recorded in the Domesday Book, though had fallen into such decay by the Dissolution of the Monasteries that little notice was taken of it, and it fell into ruin shortly afterwards. The Anglican parish church continues to be dedicated to the saint.

The village has a number of different societies. They range form the Women's Institute and Masonic Lodges to the Historical Society. There is also North Crawley Cricket Club and North Crawley Bowls Club.

There is one public house in North Crawley, The Chequers. There used to be three pubs but the Cock Inn and The Castle have closed.

== Church of St Firmin ==
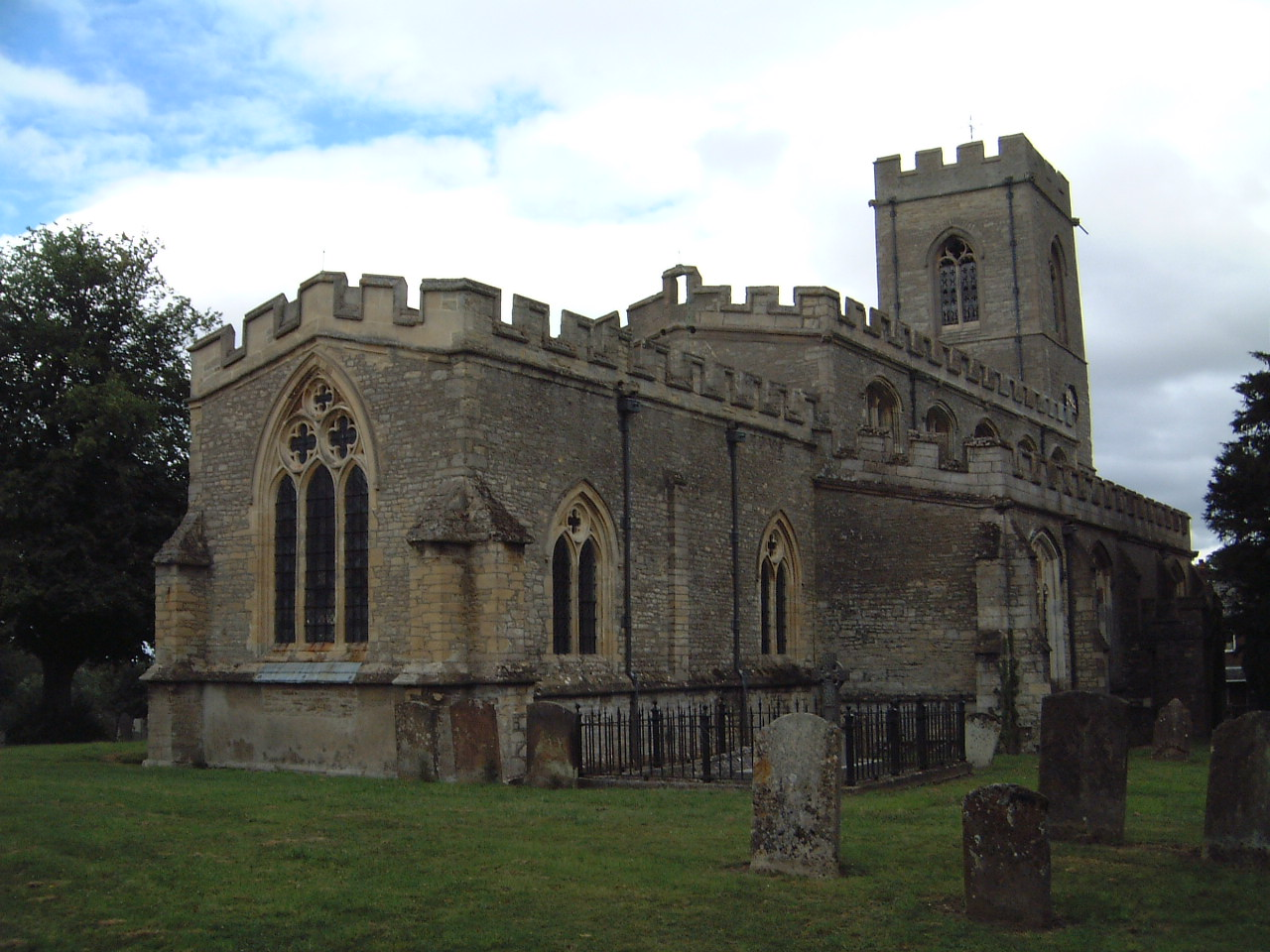
St Firmin's Church, North Crawley

The parish church is a Grade I listed building. The West tower and nave date from c. 1100, south aisle about 1210. "At the end of the 13th century the chancel was rebuilt. The date is fixed with fair certainty by an inscription cut in Lombardic capitals beneath the external sill of the east window".

== Scheduled monuments ==
There are three scheduled monuments in the parish:

- 'Moated site and fishponds 200m north-west of Up End' (at SP9179546037);
- 'Moated site immediately south of Manor Farm' (at SP9434944623);
- 'Moated site at Old Moat Farm, North Crawley' (at SP9217145056);
