= List of civil parishes in Buckinghamshire =

This is a list of civil parishes in the ceremonial county of Buckinghamshire, England. There are 221 civil parishes.

== Buckinghamshire (unitary authority area) ==
Part of the former High Wycombe Municipal Borough is unparished. Population figures are unavailable for some of the smallest parishes.

Civil parish	Population (2011)	Area (hectares) (2011)	Pre-1974 district	Pre-2020 district
Addington	145	527.20	Buckingham Rural District	Aylesbury Vale
Adstock	363	472.19	Buckingham Rural District	Aylesbury Vale
Akeley	514	534.81	Buckingham Rural District	Aylesbury Vale
Amersham (town)	14,384	2072.89	Amersham Rural District	Chiltern
Ashendon	249	860.64	Aylesbury Rural District	Aylesbury Vale
Ashley Green	980	923.95	Amersham Rural District	Chiltern
Aston Abbotts	366	932.44	Wing Rural District	Aylesbury Vale
Aston Clinton	3,682	1231.38	Aylesbury Rural District	Aylesbury Vale
Aston Sandford			Aylesbury Rural District	Aylesbury Vale
Aylesbury (town)	58,740	2186.26	Aylesbury Municipal Borough: unparished area 1974-2001	Aylesbury Vale
Barton Hartshorn			Buckingham Rural District	Aylesbury Vale
Beachampton	184	619.30	Buckingham Rural District	Aylesbury Vale
Beaconsfield (town)	12,081	1965.50	Beaconsfield Urban District	South Bucks
Biddlesden	113	1294.17	Buckingham Rural District	Aylesbury Vale
Bierton with Broughton	2,178	1284.77	Aylesbury Rural District	Aylesbury Vale
Bledlow-cum-Saunderton	2,469	3084.93	Wycombe Rural District	Wycombe
Boarstall	128	1244.48	Aylesbury Rural District	Aylesbury Vale
Bradenham	536	155.08	Wycombe Rural District	Wycombe
Brill	1,141	1102.43	Aylesbury Rural District	Aylesbury Vale
Broughton Hamlet			Aylesbury Rural District	Aylesbury Vale
Buckingham Park	1,748	403.88		Aylesbury Vale
Buckingham (town)	12,043	1126.19	Buckingham Municipal Borough	Aylesbury Vale
Buckland	713	495.99	Aylesbury Rural District	Aylesbury Vale
Burnham	11,630	1983.12	Eton Rural District	South Bucks
Calvert Green	403	273.88	Buckingham Rural District	Aylesbury Vale
Chalfont St Giles	5,925	1275.37	Amersham Rural District	Chiltern
Chalfont St Peter	12,766	1610.38	Amersham Rural District	Chiltern
Charndon	862	499.77	Buckingham Rural District	Aylesbury Vale
Chartridge	1,624	1616.97	Amersham Rural District	Chiltern
Chearsley	539	380.53	Aylesbury Rural District	Aylesbury Vale
Cheddington	1,754	623.40	Wing Rural District	Aylesbury Vale
Chenies	246	669.75	Amersham Rural District	Chiltern
Chepping Wycombe	14,648	1154.02	Wycombe Rural District	Wycombe
Chesham Bois	3,117	266.45	Amersham Rural District	Chiltern
Chesham (town)	21,483	1417.54	Chesham Urban District	Chiltern
Chetwode	173	835.09	Buckingham Rural District	Aylesbury Vale
Chilton	302	838.67	Aylesbury Rural District	Aylesbury Vale
Cholesbury-cum-St Leonards	956	970.16	Amersham Rural District	Chiltern
Coldharbour	4,858	81.90	Aylesbury Municipal Borough: unparished area 1974-2001	Aylesbury Vale
Coleshill	549	677.92	Amersham Rural District	Chiltern
Creslow			Aylesbury Rural District	Aylesbury Vale
Cublington	328	494.22	Wing Rural District	Aylesbury Vale
Cuddington	569	524.49	Aylesbury Rural District	Aylesbury Vale
Denham	7,139	1602.17	Eton Rural District	South Bucks
Dinton-with-Ford and Upton	809	1580.41	Aylesbury Rural District	Aylesbury Vale
Dorney	752	544.67	Eton Rural District	South Bucks
Dorton	166	597.91	Aylesbury Rural District	Aylesbury Vale
Downley	5,278	382.49	Wycombe Rural District	Wycombe
Drayton Beauchamp	152	430.50	Aylesbury Rural District	Aylesbury Vale
Drayton Parslow	614	707.98	Winslow Rural District	Aylesbury Vale
Dunton	189	1119.10	Winslow Rural District	Aylesbury Vale
East Claydon	345	967.47	Winslow Rural District	Aylesbury Vale
Edgcott	256	459.49	Buckingham Rural District	Aylesbury Vale
Edlesborough	2,604	1533.29	Wing Rural District	Aylesbury Vale
Ellesborough	820	1351.88	Wycombe Rural District	Wycombe
Farnham Royal	5,972	446.19	Eton Rural District	South Bucks
Fawley	258	920.69	Wycombe Rural District	Wycombe
Fleet Marston			Aylesbury Rural District	Aylesbury Vale
Foscott			Buckingham Rural District	Aylesbury Vale
Fulmer	485	558.50	Eton Rural District	South Bucks
Gawcott with Lenborough	778	1037.20	Buckingham Municipal Borough	Aylesbury Vale
Gerrards Cross	8,017	1088.26	Eton Rural District	South Bucks
Granborough	545	637.67	Winslow Rural District	Aylesbury Vale
Great and Little Hampden	300	1320.85	Wycombe Rural District	Wycombe
Great and Little Kimble cum Marsh	1,026	1211.34	Wycombe Rural District	Wycombe
Great Brickhill	817	944.45	Wing Rural District	Aylesbury Vale
Great Horwood	1,049	1321.87	Winslow Rural District	Aylesbury Vale
Great Marlow	1,167	1614.32	Wycombe Rural District	Wycombe
Great Missenden	10,138	2276.74	Amersham Rural District	Chiltern
Grendon Underwood	1,625	1038.52	Aylesbury Rural District	Aylesbury Vale
Haddenham	4,502	1324.30	Aylesbury Rural District	Aylesbury Vale
Halton	935	587.64	Aylesbury Rural District	Aylesbury Vale
Hambleden	1,445	2693.34	Wycombe Rural District	Wycombe
Hardwick	315	489.41	Aylesbury Rural District	Aylesbury Vale
Hazlemere	9,623	423.79	Amersham Rural District	Wycombe
Hedgerley	873	680.00	Eton Rural District	South Bucks
Hedsor			Wycombe Rural District	Wycombe
Hillesden	216	1054.25	Buckingham Rural District	Aylesbury Vale
Hoggeston			Winslow Rural District	Aylesbury Vale
Hogshaw			Winslow Rural District	Aylesbury Vale
Hughenden	8,362	1878.82	Wycombe Rural District	Wycombe
Hulcott			Aylesbury Rural District	Aylesbury Vale
Ibstone	242	450.83	Wycombe Rural District	Wycombe
Ickford	680	414.73	Aylesbury Rural District	Aylesbury Vale
Iver	11,119	2009.25	Eton Rural District	South Bucks
Ivinghoe	965	1860.88	Wing Rural District	Aylesbury Vale
Kingsbrook			Aylesbury Rural District	Aylesbury Vale
Kingsey	207	853.72	Aylesbury Rural District	Aylesbury Vale
Kingswood	149	444.18	Aylesbury Rural District	Aylesbury Vale
Lacey Green	2,559	1002.83	Wycombe Rural District	Wycombe
Lane End	3,509	1161.50	Wycombe Rural District	Wycombe
Latimer and Ley Hill	977	901.91	Amersham Rural District	Chiltern
Leckhampstead	192	1040.23	Buckingham Rural District	Aylesbury Vale
Lillingstone Dayrell with Luffield Abbey	103	845.33	Buckingham Rural District	Aylesbury Vale
Lillingstone Lovell	129	673.17	Buckingham Rural District	Aylesbury Vale
Little Chalfont	6,013	583.76	Amersham Rural District	Chiltern
Little Horwood	434	787.94	Winslow Rural District	Aylesbury Vale
Little Marlow	1,438	1349.19	Wycombe Rural District	Wycombe
Little Missenden	6,507	1482.97	Amersham Rural District	Chiltern
Long Crendon	2,451	1351.13	Aylesbury Rural District	Aylesbury Vale
Longwick-cum-Ilmer	1,347	1229.94	Wycombe Rural District	Wycombe
Ludgershall	409	1105.87	Aylesbury Rural District	Aylesbury Vale
Maids Moreton	847	459.28	Buckingham Rural District	Aylesbury Vale
Marlow Bottom	3,438	234.54	Wycombe Rural District	Wycombe
Marlow (town)	14,325	688.54	Marlow Urban District	Wycombe
Marsh Gibbon	969	1135.86	Buckingham Rural District	Aylesbury Vale
Marsworth	741	489.49	Wing Rural District	Aylesbury Vale
Medmenham	1,030	986.53	Wycombe Rural District	Wycombe
Mentmore	385	1117.94	Wing Rural District	Aylesbury Vale
Middle Claydon	146	1068.27	Buckingham Rural District	Aylesbury Vale
Mursley	611	1203.96	Winslow Rural District	Aylesbury Vale
Nash	417	502.44	Winslow Rural District	Aylesbury Vale
Nether Winchendon	167	627.45	Aylesbury Rural District	Aylesbury Vale
Newton Longville	1,846	749.17	Winslow Rural District	Aylesbury Vale
North Marston	781	1297.13	Winslow Rural District	Aylesbury Vale
Oakley	1,007	1219.53	Aylesbury Rural District	Aylesbury Vale
Oving	478	775.73	Aylesbury Rural District	Aylesbury Vale
Padbury	810	820.07	Buckingham Rural District	Aylesbury Vale
Penn	3,961	1647.43	Amersham Rural District	Chiltern
Piddington and Wheeler End	630	553.55	Wycombe Rural District	Wycombe
Pitchcott			Aylesbury Rural District	Aylesbury Vale
Pitstone	2,952	664.29	Wing Rural District	Aylesbury Vale
Poundon	114	395.62	Buckingham Rural District	Aylesbury Vale
Preston Bissett	282	615.20	Buckingham Rural District	Aylesbury Vale
Princes Risborough (town)	8,101	1064.32	Wycombe Rural District	Wycombe
Quainton	1,292	2201.25	Aylesbury Rural District	Aylesbury Vale
Quarrendon			Aylesbury Rural District	Aylesbury Vale
Radclive-cum-Chackmore	231	409.25	Buckingham Rural District	Aylesbury Vale
Radnage	673	553.82	Wycombe Rural District	Wycombe
Seer Green	2,311	348.93	Amersham Rural District	Chiltern
Shabbington	486	659.87	Aylesbury Rural District	Aylesbury Vale
Shalstone	117	559.16	Buckingham Rural District	Aylesbury Vale
Slapton	528	752.89	Wing Rural District	Aylesbury Vale
Soulbury	736	1748.20	Wing Rural District	Aylesbury Vale
Steeple Claydon	2,278	1347.60	Buckingham Rural District	Aylesbury Vale
Stewkley	1,840	1611.64	Winslow Rural District	Aylesbury Vale
Stoke Hammond	875	632.77	Wing Rural District	Aylesbury Vale
Stoke Mandeville	5,825	635.89	Aylesbury Rural District	Aylesbury Vale
Stoke Poges	4,752	1008.77	Eton Rural District	South Bucks
Stokenchurch	4,881	2113.09	Wycombe Rural District	Wycombe
Stone with Bishopstone and Hartwell	2,587	1328.18	Aylesbury Rural District	Aylesbury Vale
Stowe	886	1247.79	Buckingham Rural District	Aylesbury Vale
Swanbourne	437	1031.85	Winslow Rural District	Aylesbury Vale
Taplow	1,669	1121.95	Eton Rural District	South Bucks
The Lee	698	891.69	Amersham Rural District	Chiltern
Thornborough	641	988.88	Buckingham Rural District	Aylesbury Vale
Thornton	194	838.64	Buckingham Rural District	Aylesbury Vale
Tingewick	1,093	882.10	Buckingham Rural District	Aylesbury Vale
Turville	340	946.72	Wycombe Rural District	Wycombe
Turweston	211	516.67	Buckingham Rural District	Aylesbury Vale
Twyford	566	633.47	Buckingham Rural District	Aylesbury Vale
Upper Winchendon			Aylesbury Rural District	Aylesbury Vale
Waddesdon	2,097	2886.45	Aylesbury Rural District	Aylesbury Vale
Water Stratford	112	445.22	Buckingham Rural District	Aylesbury Vale
Watermead	2,343	127.12	Aylesbury Municipal Borough: unparished area 1974-2001	Aylesbury Vale
Weedon	275	293.07	Aylesbury Rural District	Aylesbury Vale
Wendover	7,399	1835.89	Aylesbury Rural District	Aylesbury Vale
West Wycombe	1,345	529.41	High Wycombe Municipal Borough	Wycombe
Westbury	447	558.18	Buckingham Rural District	Aylesbury Vale
Westcott	448	569.93	Aylesbury Rural District	Aylesbury Vale
Weston Turville	3,127	816.93	Aylesbury Rural District	Aylesbury Vale
Wexham	2,378	1119.14	Eton Rural District	South Bucks
Whaddon	533	1026.35	Winslow Rural District	Aylesbury Vale
Whitchurch	932	1053.58	Aylesbury Rural District	Aylesbury Vale
Wing	2,745	1962.74	Wing Rural District	Aylesbury Vale
Wingrave with Rowsham	1,512	1015.12	Wing Rural District	Aylesbury Vale
Winslow (town)	4,407	776.34	Winslow Rural District	Aylesbury Vale
Wooburn	10,792	1025.17	Wycombe Rural District	Wycombe
Woodham			Aylesbury Rural District	Aylesbury Vale
Worminghall	534	611.63	Aylesbury Rural District	Aylesbury Vale
Wotton Underwood	119	1052.55	Aylesbury Rural District	Aylesbury Vale

== Milton Keynes ==
The whole of the City of Milton Keynes borough is parished.

Civil parish	Governance	Origin
Abbey Hill	parish council	The larger part of the previous Bradwell Abbey parish
Astwood	Astwood and Hardmead Parish Council (joint)	Created before 1 April 1974^{12}
Bletchley and Fenny Stratford	town council	Created 2001 from unparished area^{5}
Bow Brickhill	parish council	Created before 1 April 1974^{12}
Bradwell	parish council	Created before 1 April 1974^{12}
Broughton and Milton Keynes	parish council	Created from "Broughton" and "Milton Keynes"^{12}
Calverton	parish meeting	Created 2001 from unparished area^{16}
Campbell Park	parish council	Created before 1 April 1974^{12} (renamed from Woolstone cum Willen)
Castlethorpe	parish council	Created before 1 April 1974^{12}
Central Milton Keynes	town council	Created 2001 from unparished area
Chicheley	parish meeting	Created before 1 April 1974^{12}
Clifton Reynes	Clifton Reynes and Newton Blossomville Parish Council (joint)	Created before 1 April 1974^{12}
Cold Brayfield	parish meeting	Created before 1 April 1974^{12}
Emberton	parish council	Created before 1 April 1974^{12}
Fairfields	parish council	Created 2011 from part of Calverton
Gayhurst	parish meeting	Created before 1 April 1974^{12}
Great Linford	parish council	Created before 1 April 1974^{12}
Hanslope	parish council	Created before 1 April 1974^{12}
Hardmead	Astwood and Hardmead Parish Council (joint)	Created before 1 April 1974^{12}
Haversham-cum-Little Linford	parish council	Created before 1 April 1974^{12}
Kents Hill and Monkston	parish council	Created 2001 from part of Milton Keynes parish
Lathbury	parish meeting	Created before 1 April 1974^{12}
Lavendon	parish council	Created before 1 April 1974^{12}
Little Brickhill	parish council	Created before 1 April 1974^{12}
Loughton and Great Holm	parish council	Created before 1 April 1974^{12} renamed from Loughton to Loughton and Great Holm in 2013
Moulsoe	parish council	Created before 1 April 1974^{12}
New Bradwell	parish council	Created 2001 from unparished area^{16}
Newport Pagnell	town council	Created 1985 from unparished area^{13}
Newton Blossomville	Clifton Reynes and Newton Blossomville Parish Council (joint)	Created before 1 April 1974^{12}
North Crawley	parish council	Created before 1 April 1974^{12}
Old Woughton	parish council	Created 2012 from part of Woughton parish renamed from Ouzel Valley to Old Woughton 2012
Olney	town council	Created before 1 April 1974^{12}
Ravenstone	parish council	Created before 1 April 1974^{12}
Shenley Brook End	parish council	Created before 1 April 1974^{15}
Shenley Church End	parish council	Created before 1 April 1974^{12}
Sherington	parish council	Created before 1 April 1974^{12}
Simpson and Ashland	parish council	Created (as Simpson) 2001 from unparished area^{5}
Stantonbury	parish council	Created before 1 April 1974^{12}
Stoke Goldington	parish council	Created before 1 April 1974^{12}
Stony Stratford	town council	Created 2001 from unparished area^{16}
Tyringham and Filgrave	parish meeting	Created 2001 from unparished area, former parish created before 1 April 1974 and abolished 1988^{12}
Walton	parish council	Created before 1 April 1974^{12}
Warrington	parish meeting	Created before 1 April 1974^{12}
Wavendon	parish council	Created before 1 April 1974^{12}
West Bletchley	parish council	Created 2001 from unparished area^{5}
Weston Underwood	parish council	Created before 1 April 1974^{12}
Whitehouse	parish council	Created 2011 from parts of Calverton and Shenley Church End
Woburn Sands	town council	Created before 1 April 1974^{12}
Wolverton and Greenleys	town council	Created 2001 from unparished area^{16}
Woughton	community council	Created (as Woughton on the Green) before 1 April 1974^{12}

== Notes ==
1. Formerly Amersham Rural District
2. Formerly Aylesbury Municipal Borough: unparished area 1974-2001
3. Formerly Aylesbury Rural District
4. Formerly Beaconsfield Urban District
5. Formerly Bletchley Urban District
6. Formerly Buckingham Municipal Borough
7. Formerly Buckingham Rural District
8. Formerly Chesham Urban District
9. Formerly Eton Rural District
10. Formerly High Wycombe Municipal Borough
11. Formerly Marlow Urban District
12. Formerly Newport Pagnell Rural District
13. Formerly Newport Pagnell Urban District
14. Formerly Wing Rural District
15. Formerly Winslow Rural District
16. Formerly Wolverton Urban District
17. Formerly Wycombe Rural District

== See also ==
- List of civil parishes in England
