= History of local government districts in Buckinghamshire =

The History of local government districts in Buckinghamshire began in 1835 with the formation of poor law unions. This was followed by the creation of various forms of local government body. In 1894 the existing arrangements were replaced with a system of municipal boroughs, urban and rural districts, which remained in place until 1974. Between 1974 and 2020 there were five non-metropolitan districts in the county, one of which (Milton Keynes) became a unitary authority in 1997. The other four districts were abolished in 2020 when the rest of the county was placed under the Buckinghamshire Council unitary authority.

== Poor law unions ==
The parishes of the county were grouped under the Poor Law Amendment Act 1834 to form unions. Each union was administered by a board of guardians elected by the parish ratepayers. The boundaries of the unions would later be used to define rural sanitary districts in 1875 and rural districts in 1894. Poor law unions were abolished in 1930 by the Local Government Act 1929.

Name	Notes	Area covered
Amersham PLU		Amersham, Ashley Green (1897–1930), Beaconsfield, Chalfont St Giles, Chalfont St Peter, Chartridge (1899–1930), Chenies, Chesham, Chesham Bois, Coleshill, Latimer (1899–1930), The Lee (1838–1930), Great Missenden (1838–1930), Little Missenden (1901–1930), Penn, Seer Green
Aylesbury PLU		Ashendon, Aston Abbots, Aston Clinton, Aston Sandford, Aylesbury, Bierton with Broughton, Buckland, Chearsley, Cholesbury, Creslow, Cublington, Cuddington, Dinton with Ford and Upton, Drayton Beauchamp, Fleet Marston, Grendon Underwood, Haddenham, Halton, Hardwick, Hartwell, Hawridge, Hulcott, Kingswood, Ludgershall, Oving, Pitchcott, Quainton, Quarrendon, Shipton Lee, Stoke Mandeville (1896-1930), Stone, Waddesdon, Lower Winchendon, Upper Winchendon, Weedon, Westcott, Weston Turville, Whitchurch, Wingrave with Rowsham, Woodham, Wotton Underwood
Berkhampstead PLU	Mostly in Hertfordshire	Marsworth, Nettleden, Pitstone (1835–1923)
Bicester PLU	Mostly in Oxfordshire	Boarstall
Brackley PLU	Mostly in Northamptonshire	Biddlesden, Turweston, Westbury
Buckingham PLU		Addington, Adstock, Akeley, Barton Hartshorn, Beachampton, Buckingham, Charndon, Chetwode, Edgcott, Foscott, Hillesden, Leckhampstead, Lillingstone Dayrell, Lillingstone Lovell, Luffield Abbey (1858–1930), Maids Moreton, Marsh Gibbon, Middle Claydon, Padbury, Poundon, Preston Bissett, Radclive-cum-Chackmore, Shalstone, Steeple Claydon, Stowe, Thornborough, Thornton, Tingewick, Twyford, Water Stratford
Eton PLU		Boveney, Burnham, Datchet, Denham, Dorney, Eton, Eton Wick (1894–1930), Farnham Royal, Fulmer, Gerrard's Cross (1895–1930), Hedgerley, Hedgerley Dean, Hitcham, Horton, Iver, Langley Marish, Slough (1894–1930), Stoke in Slough (1894–1896), Stoke Poges, Taplow, Upton-cum-Chalvey (1835–1901), Wexham, Wyrardisbury
Henley PLU	Mostly in Oxfordshire	Fawley, Hambleden, Medmenham
Leighton Buzzard PLU	Mostly in Bedfordshire	Cheddington, Edlesborough, Grove, Ivinghoe, Linslade, Mentmore, Pitstone (1923–1930), Slapton, Soulbury, Stoke Hammond, Wing
Newport Pagnell PLU		Astwood, Bletchley, Bow Brickhill, Bradwell, Bradwell Abbey (1861–1930), Broughton, Castlethorpe, Chicheley, Clifton Reynes, Cold Brayfield, Emberton, Fenny Stratford, Gayhurst, Great Brickhill, Great Linford, Great Woolstone, Hanslope, Hardmead, Haversham, Lathbury, Lavendon, Little Brickhill, Little Linford, Little Woolstone, Loughton, Milton Keynes, Moulsoe, New Bradwell (1919–1930), Newport Pagnell, Newton Blossomville, Newton Longville, North Crawley, Olney, Olney Park Farm (1861–1930), Petsoe Manor (1861–1930), Ravenstone, Shenley Church End, Sherington, Simpson, Stantonbury, Stoke Goldington, Tyringham and Filgrave, Walton, Warrington, Water Eaton, Wavendon, Weston Underwood, Willen, Woburn Sands, Woughton on the Green
Potterspury PLU	Mostly in Northamptonshire	Calverton, Stony Stratford East, Stony Stratford West, Wolverton
Thame PLU	Mostly in Oxfordshire	Brill, Chilton, Dorton, Ickford, Kingsey, Long Crendon, Oakley, Shabbington, Worminghall
Winslow PLU		Drayton Parslow, Dunton, East Claydon, Granborough, Great Horwood, Hoggeston, Hogshaw, Little Horwood, Mursley, Nash, North Marston, Shenley Brook End (1866-1894), Stewkley, Swanbourne, Tattenhoe, Whaddon, Winslow
Wycombe PLU		Bledlow, Bradenham, Chepping Wycombe (1835–1894), Chepping Wycombe Rural (1894–1930), Chepping Wycombe Urban (1894–1896), Ellesborough, Fingest and Lane End, Great and Little Hampden (1885–1930), Great Hampden (1835–1885), Great Kimble (1835–1885), Great and Little Kimble (1885–1930), Great Marlow, Hedsor, High Wycombe (1896–1930), Horsenden, Hughenden, Ibstone, Ilmer, Lewknor Uphill (1866–1885), Little Hampden (1835–1885), Little Kimble (1835–1885), Little Marlow, Little Missenden (1835–1901), Marlow Urban (1896–1930), Medmenham (1835–1945), Monks Risborough, Princes Risborough, Radnage, Saunderton, Stoke Mandeville (1835-1896), Stokenchurch, Turville, Wendover, Wycombe (1866–1896), West Wycombe, Wooburn

== Local boards of health and sanitary districts ==
Following the enactment of the Public Health Act 1848 (11 & 12 Vict. c. 63), boards of health could be formed on petition of the inhabitants or where there was excess mortality. The Local Government Act 1858 simplified the process of creating local councils: ratepayers of a parish or area could adopt the Act by resolution, whereupon it would become a Local Government District, governed by a Local Board.

The system was rationalised by the Public Health Act 1875 (38 & 39 Vict. c. 55), which designated all municipal boroughs, local board districts, local government districts and improvement commissioners districts in England and Wales as urban sanitary districts. The existing local authority became an urban sanitary authority, without change of title. In Buckinghamshire this applied to Aylesbury, Beaconsfield, Buckingham, Chesham, Eton, Slough and Chepping Wycombe. Also created were rural sanitary districts, which were identical in area to poor law unions, less any urban sanitary district. The poor law guardians for the parishes in the district became the rural sanitary authority.

== List of districts 1835–1894 ==
=== Municipal boroughs, local boards and urban sanitary districts 1835–1894 ===
Municipal boroughs (MBs) were created by the Municipal Corporations Act 1835, local board districts (LBDs) were created by the Public Health Act 1848 (11 & 12 Vict. c. 63) and governed by a local board of health, local government districts (LGDs) were created by the Local Government Act 1858 and governed by a local board. These all became urban sanitary authorities in 1875.

Name	Formed	Area covered
Aylesbury LBD	1849	Parish of Aylesbury
Beaconsfield LBD	1850	Parish of Beaconsfield
Buckingham MB	1835	Parish of Buckingham
Chepping Wycombe MB	1835	Parish of Wycombe and part of Chepping Wycombe
Chesham LGD	1884	Parish of Chesham
Eton LBD	1849	Part of the parish of Eton
Slough LGD	1863	Parts of the parishes of Stoke Poges and Upton cum Chalvey

=== Rural sanitary districts 1875–1894 ===
Name	Notes	Area covered
Amersham RSD		Amersham, Chalfont St Giles, Chalfont St Peter, Chenies, Chesham (1875–1884), Chesham Bois, Coleshill, Great Missenden, Lee, Penn, Seer Green
Aylesbury RSD		Ashendon, Aston Abbots, Aston Clinton, Aston Sandford, Bierton with Broughton, Buckland, Chearsley, Cholesbury, Creslow, Cublington, Cuddington, Dinton with Ford and Upton, Drayton Beauchamp, Fleet Marston, Grendon Underwood, Haddenham, Halton, Buckinghamshire, Hardwick, Hartwell, Hawridge, Hulcott, Kingswood, Ludgershall, Oving, Pitchcott, Quainton, Quarrendon, Shipton Lee, Stone, Waddesdon, Lower Winchendon, Upper Winchendon, Weedon, Westcott, Weston Turville, Whitchurch, Wingrave with Rowsham, Woodham, Wotton Underwood
Berkhampstead RSD	Mostly in Hertfordshire	Marsworth, Pitstone
Bicester RSD	Mostly in Oxfordshire	Boarstall
Brackley RSD	Mostly in Northamptonshire	Biddlesden, Turweston, Westbury
Buckingham RSD		Addington, Adstock, Akeley, Barton Hartshorn, Beachampton, Charndon, Chetwode, Edgcott, Foscott, Hillesden, Leckhampstead, Lillingstone Dayrell, Lillingstone Lovell, Luffield Abbey, Maids Moreton, Marsh Gibbon, Middle Claydon, Padbury, Poundon, Preston Bissett, Radclive-cum-Chackmore, Shalstone, Steeple Claydon, Stowe, Thornborough, Thornton, Tingewick, Twyford, Water Stratford
Eton RSD		Boveney, Burnham, Datchet, Denham, Dorney, Eton (part), Farnham Royal, Fulmer, Hedgerley, Hedgerley & Dean, Hitcham, Horton, Iver, Langley Marish, Stoke Poges (part), Taplow, Upton-cum-Chalvey (part), Wexham, Wyrardisbury
Henley RSD	Mostly in Oxfordshire	Fawley, Hambleden, Medmenham
Leighton Buzzard RSD	Mostly in Bedfordshire	Cheddington, Edlesborough, Grove, Ivinghoe, Linslade, Mentmore, Slapton, Soulbury, Stoke Hammond, Wing
Newport Pagnell RSD		Astwood, Bletchley, Bow Brickhill, Bradwell, Bradwell Abbey, Broughton, Castlethorpe, Chicheley, Clifton Reynes, Cold Brayfield, Emberton, Fenny Stratford, Gayhurst, Great Brickhill, Great Linford, Great Woolstone, Hanslope, Hardmead, Haversham, Lathbury, Lavendon, Little Brickhill, Little Linford, Little Woolstone, Loughton, Milton Keynes, Moulsoe, Newport Pagnell, Newton Blossomville, Newton Longville, North Crawley, Olney, Petsoe Manor, Ravenstone, Shenley Church End, Sherington, Simpson, Stantonbury, Stoke Goldington, Tyringham and Filgrave, Walton, Warrington, Water Eaton, Wavendon, Weston Underwood, Willen, Woughton on the Green
Potterspury RSD	Mostly in Northamptonshire	Calverton, Stony Stratford East, Stony Stratford West, Wolverton
Thame RSD	Mostly in Oxfordshire	Brill, Chilton, Dorton, Ickford, Kingsey, Long Crendon, Oakley, Shabbington, Worminghall
Winslow RSD		Drayton Parslow, Dunton, East Claydon, Granborough, Great Horwood, Hoggeston, Hogshaw, Little Horwood, Mursley, Nash, North Marston, Shenley Brook End, Stewkley, Swanbourne, Tattenhoe, Whaddon, Winslow
Wycombe RSD		Bledlow, Bradenham, Chepping Wycombe (part), Ellesborough, Fingest and Lane End, Great Hampden, Great Kimble, Great Marlow, Hedsor, Horsenden, Hughenden, Ibstone, Ilmer, Lewknor Uphill, Little Hampden, Little Kimble, Little Marlow, Little Missenden, Monks Risborough, Princes Risborough, Radnage, Saunderton, Stoke Mandeville, Turville, Wendover, West Wycombe, Wooburn

== County districts 1894–1974 ==
The Local Government Act 1894 (56 & 57 Vict. c. 73) reconstituted rural sanitary districts as rural districts and urban sanitary districts (other than municipal boroughs) as urban districts. Rural sanitary districts were split into multiple rural districts if they crossed county lines. Where a parish was partly in an urban sanitary district and partly in a rural sanitary district, it was split into two civil parishes. All districts were abolished in 1974.

District	Formed from	Successor
Amersham Rural District	Amersham RSD	Chiltern
Aylesbury Rural District	Aylesbury RSD	Aylesbury Vale
Aylesbury Urban District (1894–1917) incorporated Municipal Borough of Aylesbury (1917–1974)	Aylesbury LBD	Aylesbury Vale
Beaconsfield Urban District	Beaconsfield LBD	Beaconsfield
Fenny Stratford Urban District (1895–1911) renamed Bletchley Urban District (1911–1974)	Newport Pagnell Rural District (part)	Milton Keynes
Municipal Borough of Buckingham		Aylesbury Vale
Buckingham Rural District	Buckingham RSD; Brackley RSD (part)	Aylesbury Vale
Chesham Urban District	Chesham LGD	Chiltern
Eton Rural District	Eton RSD	Beaconsfield; Slough (Berkshire); Windsor and Maidenhead (Berkshire)
Eton Urban District	Eton LBD	Windsor and Maidenhead (Berkshire)
Hambleden Rural District (1894–1934)	Henley RSD (part)	Wycombe Rural District
Municipal Borough of Chepping Wycombe (until 1946) renamed Municipal Borough of High Wycombe (1946–1974)		Wycombe
Linslade Urban District (1897–1965)	Wing Rural District (part)	Leighton-Linslade Urban District (Bedfordshire)
Long Crendon Rural District (1894–1934)	Bicester RSD (part); Thame RSD (part)	Aylesbury Rural District; Bullingdon Rural District (Oxfordshire)
Marlow Urban District (1896–1974)	Wycombe Rural District (part)	Wycombe
Newport Pagnell Rural District	Newport Pagnell RSD	Milton Keynes
Newport Pagnell Urban District (1897–1974)	Newport Pagnell Rural District (part)	Milton Keynes
Slough Urban District (1894–1938) incorporated Municipal Borough of Slough (1938–1974)	Slough LGD	Slough (Berkshire)
Wing Rural District	Berkhampstead RSD (part); Leighton Buzzard RSD (part)	Aylesbury Vale
Winslow Rural District	Winslow RSD	Milton Keynes; Aylesbury Vale
Stratford and Wolverton Rural District (1894–1919) reconstituted Stratford and Wolverton Urban District (1919–1920) renamed Wolverton Urban District (1920–1974)	Potterspury RSD (part)	Milton Keynes
Wycombe Rural District	Wycombe RSD	Wycombe

== Non-metropolitan districts ==
Between 1974 and 2020 there were five non-metropolitan districts in the county:

- Aylesbury Vale
- Chiltern
- Milton Keynes
- South Bucks (called Beaconsfield 1974–1980)
- Wycombe

Milton Keynes Borough Council was made a unitary authority in 1997, making it independent from Buckinghamshire County Council. The other four districts were abolished in 2020 when the rest of the county was placed under the new Buckinghamshire Council unitary authority, which also replaced the county council.

On 15 August 2022, Milton Keynes received letters patent, giving the borough the status of a city, allowing the council to change its name to Milton Keynes City Council.
