= Buckingham Rural District =

Former local government area in the UK

Coordinates: 51.9956°N 0.9868°W

- Rural District
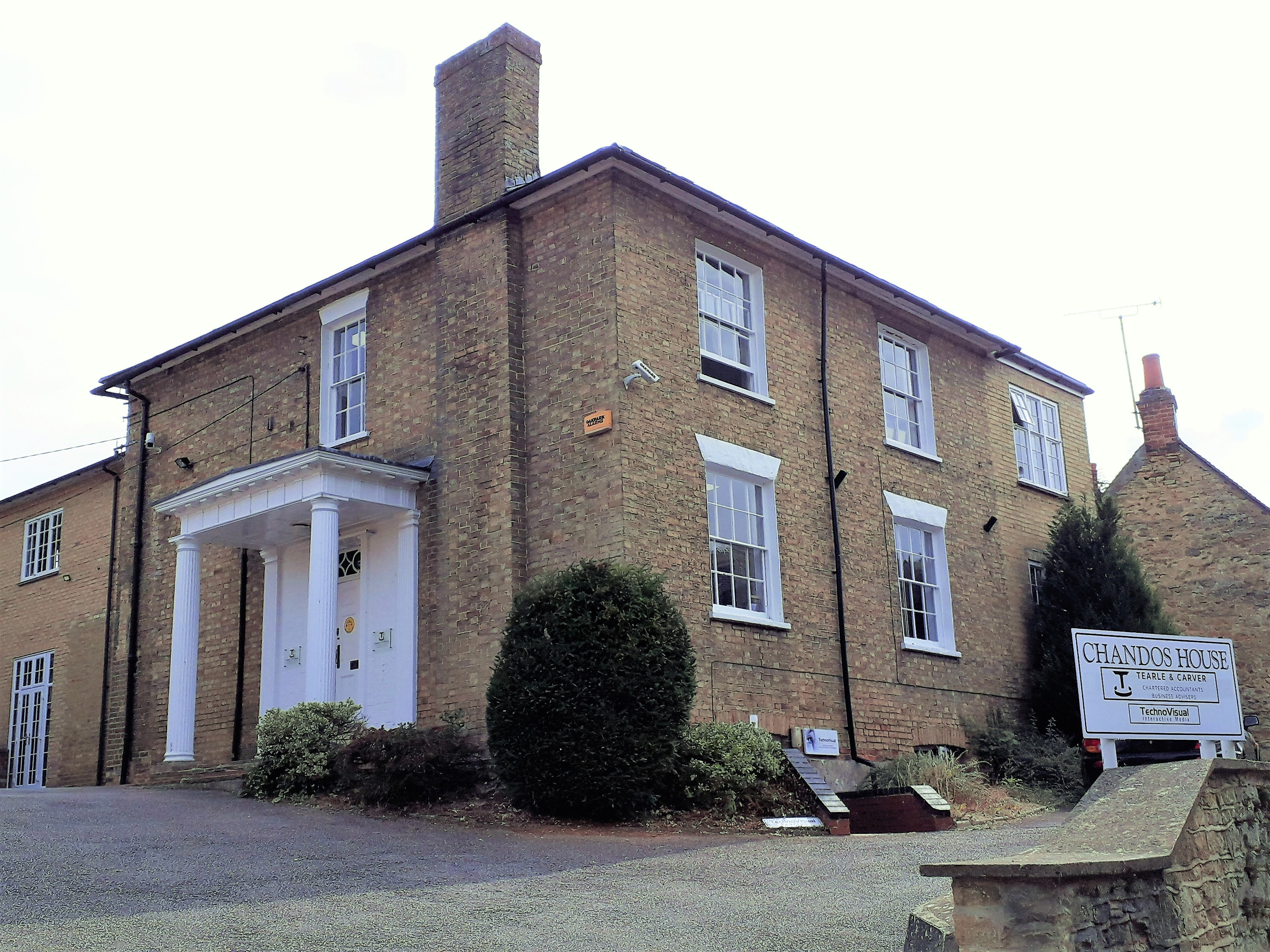
- Chandos House, School Lane, Buckingham: Council's headquarters 1926–1974
- Area
  - 1901: 54,893 acres (222.1 km^{2})
  - 1971: 54,528 acres (220.7 km^{2})
- Population
  - 1901: 8,124
  - 1971: 8,760
- History
  - Created: 28 December 1894
  - Abolished: 31 March 1974
  - Succeeded by: Aylesbury Vale
  - HQ: Buckingham

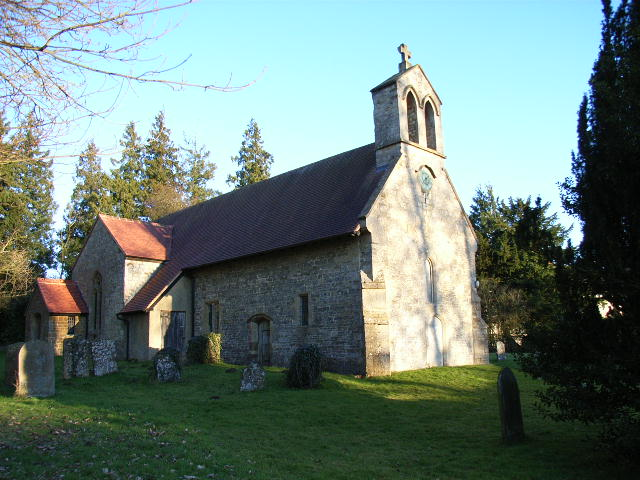
Church of England parish church of St James, Barton Hartshorn, Buckinghamshire, 2006

Buckingham Rural District was a rural district in the administrative county of Buckinghamshire, England from 1894 to 1974, covering an area in the north-west of the county. It was named after but did not include the borough of Buckingham.

== History ==
The district had its origins in the Buckingham Poor Law Union, which had been created in 1835, covering Buckingham itself and several surrounding parishes. In 1872 sanitary districts were established, giving public health and local government responsibilities for rural areas to the existing boards of guardians of poor law unions. The Buckingham Rural Sanitary District therefore covered the area of the poor law union except for Buckingham itself, which was a municipal borough and so formed its own urban sanitary authority. The Buckingham Rural Sanitary District was administered from Buckingham Union Workhouse which had been built in 1838 at 19 Stratford Road, Buckingham.

Under the Local Government Act 1894, rural sanitary districts became rural districts from 28 December 1894. The act also directed that districts should not straddle county boundaries. Whilst the Buckingham Rural Sanitary District was entirely in Buckinghamshire, the neighbouring Brackley Rural Sanitary District straddled Northamptonshire, Oxfordshire, and Buckinghamshire. It was therefore decided before the act came into force that the three Buckinghamshire parishes from the Brackley Rural Sanitary District (Biddlesden, Turweston, and Westbury), would be added to the Buckingham Rural District. The Buckingham Rural District Council held its first meeting on 29 December 1894 at the workhouse in Buckingham. William Weston of Adstock was appointed the first chairman of the council.

== Civil parishes ==
Buckingham Rural District comprised the following civil parishes:

- Addington, Adstock, Akeley
- Barton Hartshorn, Beachampton, Biddlesden
- Charndon, Chetwode
- Edgcott
- Foscott
- Hillesden
- Leckhampstead, Lillingstone Dayrell, Lillingstone Lovell, Luffield Abbey
- Maids Moreton, Marsh Gibbon, Middle Claydon
- Padbury, Poundon, Preston Bissett
- Radclive-cum-Chackmore
- Shalstone, Steeple Claydon, Stowe
- Thornborough, Thornton, Tingewick, Turweston, Twyford
- Water Stratford, Westbury

== Premises ==
Until the 1920s the council met at the Buckingham Union Workhouse at 19 Stratford Road, Buckingham, with administrative functions being carried out at various offices in Buckingham. In 1926 the council bought a large early nineteenth century house called Chandos House on School Lane in Buckingham for £400, and converted it to become their offices and meeting place. The council remained based at Chandos House until its abolition in 1974.

== Abolition ==
Buckingham Rural District was abolished under the Local Government Act 1972. The area became part of the Aylesbury Vale district on 1 April 1974.
