= Calvert Green =

Civil parish in Buckinghamshire, England

Coordinates: 51.912°N 1.003°W

- Location within Buckinghamshire
- Population: 403 (2011 Census)
- OS grid reference: SP687243
- Civil parish: Calvert Green
- Unitary authority: Buckinghamshire
- Ceremonial county: Buckinghamshire
- Region: South East
- Country: England
- Sovereign state: United Kingdom
- Post town: BUCKINGHAM
- Postcode district: MK18
- Dialling code: 01296
- Police: Thames Valley
- Fire: Buckinghamshire
- Ambulance: South Central
- UK Parliament: Mid Buckinghamshire

Calvert Green is a civil parish in Aylesbury Vale, Buckinghamshire, England. It was created in 2003 from parts of Charndon and Steeple Claydon civil parishes. It centres on a new housing estate built upon the site of old brickworks. The village hall, in the centre of the development, was erected above the old kilns.
