= Winslow Rural District =

Historical rural district

Coordinates: 51.940305°N 0.887017°W

Winslow
- Rural district
- Area
  - 1911: 34,525 acres (139.7 km^{2})
  - 1961: 36,437 acres (147.5 km^{2})
- Population
  - 1901: 7,034
  - 1971: 9,800
- History
  - Created: 28 December 1894
  - Abolished: 31 March 1974
  - Succeeded by: Aylesbury Vale, Milton Keynes
- Status: Rural district
  - HQ: Winslow

Winslow Rural District was a rural district in the administrative county of Buckinghamshire, England from 1894 to 1974, covering an area in the north of the county.

== Origins ==
The district had its origins in the Winslow Poor Law Union, which had been created in 1835, covering Winslow itself and several surrounding parishes. In 1872 sanitary districts were established, giving public health and local government responsibilities for rural areas to the existing boards of guardians of poor law unions. As there were no urban authorities within the Winslow Poor Law Union, the Winslow Rural Sanitary District covered the same area as the poor law union. The poor law union and rural sanitary district were administered from Winslow Union Workhouse, which had been built in 1835 at 1 Buckingham Road in Winslow.

Under the Local Government Act 1894, rural sanitary districts became rural districts from 28 December 1894. The Winslow Rural District Council held its first meeting on 28 December 1894 at the board room of the workhouse. Thomas Briggs of North Marston was appointed the first chairman of the council.

== Civil parishes ==
Winslow Rural District contained the following civil parishes:

- Drayton Parslow
- Dunton
- East Claydon
- Granborough
- Great Horwood
- Hoggeston
- Hogshaw
- Little Horwood
- Mursley
- Nash
- Newton Longville (1934–1974)
- North Marston
- Shenley Brook End split in 1974 between Milton Keynes and Aylesbury Vale (Whaddon parish)
- Stewkley
- Swanbourne
- Tattenhoe split in 1974 between Milton Keynes (Shenley Brook End parish) and Aylesbury Vale (Whaddon parish)
- Whaddon split in 1974 between Milton Keynes (Shenley Brook End parish) and Aylesbury Vale
- Winslow

== Premises ==
Until the 1930s the council was based at the workhouse at 1 Buckingham Road, which after 1930 was renamed Winslow Institution. In 1936 the council moved its offices to a house nearby at 162 High Street.

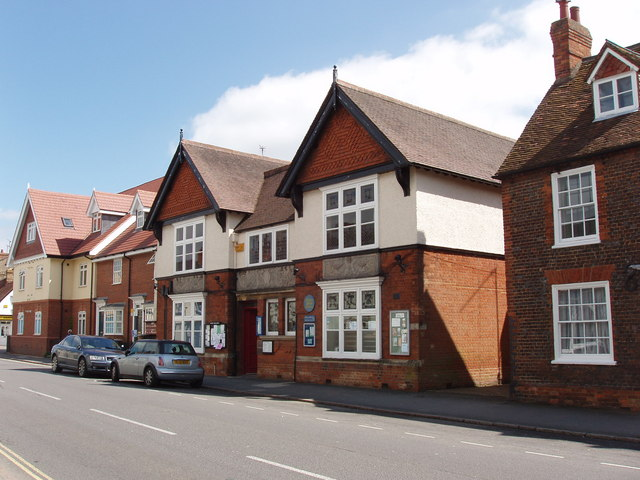
28 High Street, Winslow: council's headquarters 1945–1974.

In 1945 the council moved to 28-30 High Street, comprising an 1860s house called "The Elms" at 30 High Street and the adjoining office building at 28 High Street, which had been built in 1889 by a local solicitor. The council was then based at 28-30 High Street until its abolition.

== Abolition ==
Winslow Rural District was abolished under the Local Government Act 1972. Most of its territory was included in the Aylesbury Vale district, except for the parts which were within the designated area for the new town of Milton Keynes, which went instead to the Borough of Milton Keynes. The part of the council's former offices at 28 High Street are now used as the offices of Winslow Town Council. The part at 30 High Street was redeveloped for housing in the early 2000s.
