= Long Crendon Rural District =

Rural district in England, abolished 1934

Coordinates: 51.7728°N 0.9967°W

Long Crendon
- Rural district
- Area
  - 1911: 21,262 acres (86.0 km^{2})
  - 1931: 21,262 acres (86.0 km^{2})
- Population
  - 1901: 4,388
  - 1931: 3,822
- History
  - Created: 28 December 1894
  - Abolished: 31 March 1934
  - Succeeded by: Aylesbury Rural District
  - HQ: Thame

Long Crendon was a rural district in the administrative county of Buckinghamshire, England from 1894 to 1934.

== History ==
Long Crendon Rural District had its origins in the Thame Poor Law Union, which had been created in 1835. The poor law union was mostly in Oxfordshire but included some parishes in Buckinghamshire. Poor law unions formed the basis for sanitary districts when they were created in 1872, with the area becoming the Thame Rural Sanitary District, administered by the board of guardians for the poor law union, which was based at the Union Workhouse on Oxford Road in Thame. Under the Local Government Act 1894, rural sanitary districts became rural districts on 28 December 1894, and where sanitary districts straddled county boundaries they were split to create separate rural districts for the parts in each county. The Long Crendon Rural District was therefore created covering the Buckinghamshire parishes from the Thame Rural Sanitary District, and also took in the parish of Boarstall from the Bicester Rural Sanitary District.

Long Crendon Rural District Council held its first meeting on 4 January 1895 at the workhouse in Thame, when George Roads was appointed the first chairman.

== Parishes ==
The district consisted of the following parishes:

- Boarstall
- Brill
- Chilton
- Dorton
- Ickford
- Long Crendon
- Oakley
- Shabbington
- Towersey
- Worminghall

Boarstall was the only parish transferring from the Bicester RSD rather than the Thame RSD.

== Premises ==
Although named after Long Crendon, the council was administered from Thame. Meetings of the council throughout its existence were held at the workhouse in Thame, whilst administrative functions were carried out at various offices in Thame, generally being the offices of the solicitors who acted as clerk to the council.

== Abolition ==
The district was abolished under a County Review Order, mainly becoming part of Aylesbury Rural District, with Towersey parish going to Bullingdon Rural District in Oxfordshire (in an exchange that saw Kingsey, which had been part of Thame RD, made part of Aylesbury RD as well).
