= Hogshaw Nunnery =

Nunnery in Buckinghamshire, England

Coordinates: 51.8958°N 0.9289°W

Hogshaw Nunnery was a nunnery in Hogshaw, Buckinghamshire, England. In the 15th century it became the Hogshaw Commandery, associated with the Knights Templar.
