= Aylesbury Rural District =

Former local government area in the UK

Coordinates: 51.816°N 0.817°W

Aylesbury
- Rural district
- Area
  - 1901: 72,123 acres (291.9 km^{2})
  - 1961: 89,307 acres (361.4 km^{2})
- Population
  - 1901: 15,622
  - 1971: 38,573
- History
  - Created: 28 December 1894
  - Abolished: 31 March 1974
  - Succeeded by: Aylesbury Vale
  - HQ: Aylesbury

Aylesbury was a rural district in the administrative county of Buckinghamshire, England from 1894 to 1974. It was named after but did not include Aylesbury, which was a separate municipal borough.

== History ==
The district had its origins in the Aylesbury Poor Law Union, which had been created in 1835, covering Aylesbury itself and several surrounding parishes. In 1872 sanitary districts were established, giving public health and local government responsibilities for rural areas to the existing boards of guardians of poor law unions. The Aylesbury Rural Sanitary District therefore covered the area of the poor law union except for Aylesbury itself, which had a local board of health and so formed its own urban sanitary district. The Aylesbury Rural Sanitary District was administered from Aylesbury Union Workhouse, which had been built in 1844 at 100 Bierton Road in Aylesbury.

Under the Local Government Act 1894, rural sanitary districts became rural districts from 28 December 1894.

The boundaries of the district were substantially altered in the 1930s. In 1933 the county boundary with Oxfordshire was adjusted, and the parish of Kingsey was added to Buckinghamshire and to Aylesbury Rural District. In 1934 a County Review Order reorganised all the county districts in Buckinghamshire. Aylesbury Rural District took in most of the disbanded Long Crendon Rural District, while a number of parishes were transferred to Wing Rural District.

== Civil parishes ==
The rural district contained the following civil parishes:

- Ashendon
- Aston Abbots (until 1934)‡
- Aston Clinton
- Aston Sandford
- Bierton with Broughton
- Boarstall (from 1934)†
- Brill (from 1934)†
- Buckland
- Chearsley
- Chilton (from 1934)†
- Cholesbury (until 1934: became part of Cholesbury cum St Leonards CP in Amersham RD)
- Creslow
- Cublington (until 1934)‡
- Cuddington
- Dinton-with-Ford and Upton
- Dorton (from 1934)†
- Drayton Beauchamp
- Granborough (until 1934)‡
- Great Brickhill (until 1934)‡
- Grendon Underwood
- Haddenham
- Halton
- Hardwick
- Hartwell
- Hawridge (until 1934: became part of Cholesbury cum St Leonards CP in Amersham RD)
- Hulcott
- Ickford (from 1934)†
- Kingsey (from 1933: transferred from Oxfordshire)
- Kingswood
- Long Crendon (from 1934)†
- Lower Winchendon
- Ludgershall
- Fleet Marston
- Oakley (from 1934)†
- Oving
- Pitchcott
- Quainton
- Quarrendon
- Shabbington (from 1934)†
- Stoke Mandeville
- Stone
- Upper Winchendon
- Waddesdon
- Weedon
- Wendover
- Westcott
- Weston Turville
- Whitchurch
- Wingrave with Rowsham (until 1934)‡
- Woodham
- Worminghall (from 1934)†
- Wotton Underwood

† Formerly in Long Crendon Rural District

‡Transferred to Wing Rural District

== Premises ==
The council held its first meeting on 2 January 1895 at the board room of the Aylesbury Union Workhouse. Robert William Locke was appointed the first chairman of the council. The council continued to meet at the workhouse until 1902, when it started holding its monthly meetings at Aylesbury Town Hall, but kept its annual meeting at the workhouse so that it could be held immediately following the annual meeting of the Aylesbury Board of Guardians.

The council moved its meeting place and offices to 21 Walton Street, Aylesbury in 1912. It was only based there for seven years, with Buckinghamshire County Council buying the building in 1919. The district council's staff were found temporary offices and council meetings returned to Aylesbury Town Hall.

In 1921 the council took a lease of Granville House at 16 Granville Street, Aylesbury, to serve as its meeting place and offices. The council stayed at 16 Granville Street until 1932, when it moved to 43 Buckingham Street, Aylesbury.

In 1962 the council moved again to a modern office building at 84 Walton Street. The council chamber there was used for the trial in 1964 of the Great Train Robbery, as the usual building at Aylesbury Crown Court was not large enough for all the press interested in the case. The council remained based at 84 Walton Street until its abolition in 1974.

== Abolition ==
The rural district was abolished in 1974 by the Local Government Act 1972, with its area forming part of the non-metropolitan district of Aylesbury Vale.
