= Eaton Bray Rural District =

Former local government area in the UK

Coordinates: 51.877°N 0.592°W

- Rural district
- Population
  - 1901: 4,101
  - 1931: 3,935
- History
  - Created: 28 December 1894
  - Abolished: 31 March 1933
  - Succeeded by: Luton Rural District
  - HQ: Leighton Buzzard (1894–1929); Linslade (1929–1933)
- Contained within
  - County Council: Bedfordshire
- Map of boundary as of abolition

Eaton Bray was a rural district in Bedfordshire, England from 1894 to 1933.

== History ==
The district had its origins in the Leighton Buzzard Rural Sanitary District. This had been created under the Public Health Acts of 1872 and 1875, giving public health and local government responsibilities for rural areas to the existing Boards of Guardians of Poor Law Unions.

Under the Local Government Act 1894, Rural Sanitary Districts became Rural Districts from 28 December 1894, and rural sanitary districts which straddled county boundaries were to be split so that separate rural districts were created for the parts in each county. The Bedfordshire part of the Leighton Buzzard Rural Sanitary District became the Eaton Bray Rural District, whilst the Buckinghamshire part became the Linslade Rural District (renamed Wing Rural District in 1897 after Linslade itself was made an urban district). The link with the Poor Law Union continued, with all the elected councillors of both Eaton Bray and Linslade Rural District Councils being ex officio members of the Leighton Buzzard Board of Guardians. The first meeting of the new Eaton Bray Rural District Council was held on 28 December 1894 at the Leighton Buzzard Union Workhouse, immediately after a meeting of the Board of Guardians. The council's first chairman was John Britten of Heath and Reach.

The district was enlarged by the addition of the parishes of Chalgrave, Hockliffe and Tilsworth in 1900, which had all been part of the neighbouring Woburn Rural District, which was abolished.

== Parishes ==
The rural district contained the following civil parishes:

- Billington
- Chalgrave (after 1900)
- Eaton Bray
- Eggington
- Heath and Reach
- Hockliffe (after 1900)
- Stanbridge
- Tilsworth (after 1900)

== Premises ==
Whilst the district was named after the parish of Eaton Bray, the council was never based there. From its formation until 1929 the council met at the Union Workhouse on Grovebury Road, Leighton Buzzard, with administrative functions carried out at 30 High Street, Leighton Buzzard, which was the office of the solicitor who acted as clerk to the council. In 1929 the Linslade Urban District Council's offices at 6 Leighton Road in Linslade were extended to allow them to serve as the offices and meeting place for Linslade Urban District Council, Wing Rural District Council and Eaton Bray Rural District Council. The council then remained based at 6 Leighton Road, Linslade until its abolition in 1933.

== Abolition ==
Eaton Bray Rural District was abolished in 1933 under a County Review Order being merged into the Luton Rural District apart from a small area of Heath and Reach parish which was transferred to Leighton Buzzard Urban District instead. These changes took effect on 1 April 1933.
