= Amersham Rural District =

Former rural district in Buckinghamshire, England

Coordinates: 51.6769°N 0.6034°W

Amersham
- Rural district
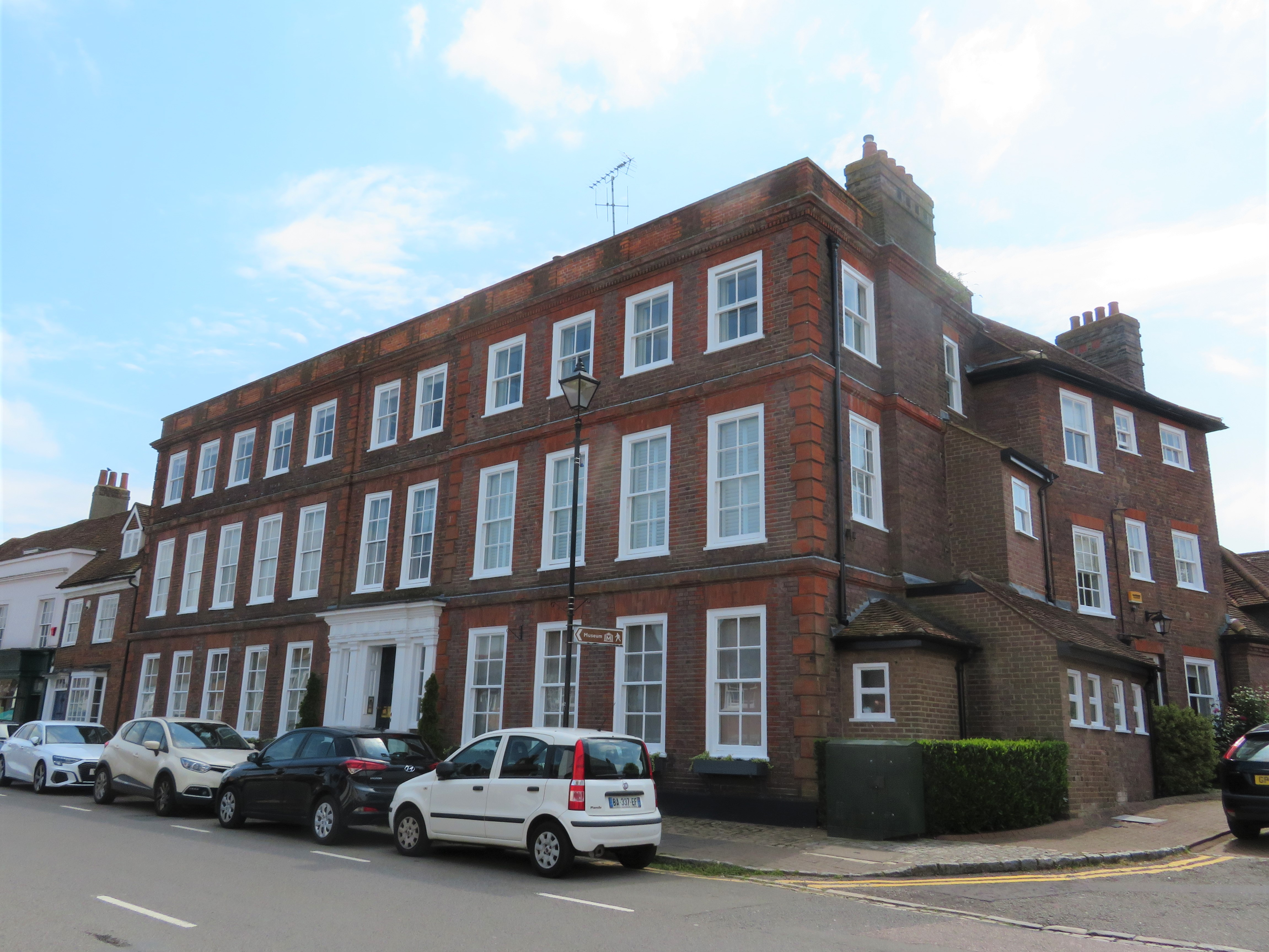
- Elmodesham House, 42 High Street, Amersham: council's headquarters 1931–1974
- Area
  - 1911: 45,700 acres (184.9 km^{2})
  - 1961: 46,232 acres (187.1 km^{2})
- Population
  - 1901: 13,800
  - 1971: 68,516
- History
  - Created: 28 December 1894
  - Abolished: 31 March 1974
  - Succeeded by: Chiltern District
- Status: Rural district
  - HQ: Amersham

Amersham Rural District was a rural district in the administrative county of Buckinghamshire, England from 1894 to 1974, covering an area in the south-east of the county.

== Origins ==
The district had its origins in the Amersham Poor Law Union, which had been created in 1835, covering Amersham itself and several surrounding parishes. In 1872 sanitary districts were established, giving public health and local government responsibilities for rural areas to the existing boards of guardians of poor law unions. The Amersham Rural Sanitary District therefore covered the area of the poor law union except for the town of Beaconsfield, which had an urban authority and so became its own urban sanitary district. Chesham was subsequently made its own urban sanitary district in 1884, removing it from the Amersham Rural Sanitary District. The Amersham Rural Sanitary District was administered from Amersham Union Workhouse, which had been built in 1838 on Whielden Road in Amersham.

Under the Local Government Act 1894, rural sanitary districts became rural districts from 28 December 1894. The Amersham Rural District Council held its first meeting on 3 January 1895 at the workhouse. George Weller of Amersham was appointed the first chairman of the council.

== Civil parishes ==
The parishes were originally:

- Amersham
- Ashley Green (created 1897 from part of Chesham)
- Chalfont St Giles
- Chalfont St Peter
- Chartridge (created 1899 from part of Chesham)
- Chenies
- Chesham Bois
- Cholesbury-cum-St Leonards (created 1934 from 4 parishes plus parcels of land previously in Aylesbury Rural District)
- Coleshill
- Great Missenden
- Latimer (created 1899 from part of Chesham)
- Little Missenden (until 1930)
- Penn
- Seer Green
- The Lee

== Premises ==
The council was initially based at the workhouse on Whielden Road, continuing to meet there until the 1930s. In 1931 the council purchased Elmodesham House at 42 High Street in Amersham for £3,300, converting it to become their offices and meeting place. The premises at Elmodesham House were officially opened on 8 October 1931. The council remained based at Elmodesham House until its abolition in 1974.

== Abolition ==
Amersham Rural District was abolished under the Local Government Act 1972, merging with neighbouring Chesham Urban District to become Chiltern District. The former Amersham Rural District Council offices at Elmodesham House subsequently served as the main offices of Chiltern District Council until 1986, when the council moved to a purpose-built office on King George V Road in Amersham. Elmodesham House has subsequently been converted into flats.
