= Wing Rural District =

Historical rural district

Coordinates: 51.898°N 0.717°W

Wing Linslade Rural District (1894–1897)
- Rural district
- Area
  - 1901: 27,770 acres (112.4 km^{2})
  - 1961: 36,457 acres (147.5 km^{2})
- Population
  - 1901: 6,274
  - 1971: 10,615
- History
  - Created: 28 December 1894
  - Abolished: 31 March 1974
  - Succeeded by: Aylesbury Vale District
  - HQ: Leighton Buzzard (1894-1929); Linslade (1929-1974)

Wing Rural District was a rural district in the administrative county of Buckinghamshire, England. It was created in 1894 with the name Linslade Rural District, but was renamed Wing Rural District in 1897 when Linslade itself was removed from the district to become an urban district. Wing Rural District was abolished in 1974 to become part of Aylesbury Vale District.

== History ==
Wing Rural District had its origins in the Leighton Buzzard Poor Law Union, which had been created in 1835. The poor law union straddled Bedfordshire and Buckinghamshire. A workhouse was built in 1836 on Grovebury Road in Leighton Buzzard to serve the area. Poor law unions formed the basis for sanitary districts when they were created in 1872, with the area becoming the Leighton Buzzard Rural Sanitary District, administered by the board of guardians for the poor law union. Under the Local Government Act 1894, rural sanitary districts became rural districts on 28 December 1894, and where sanitary districts straddled county boundaries they were split to create separate rural districts for the parts in each county. The Leighton Buzzard Rural Sanitary District was therefore split into the Eaton Bray Rural District for the parts in Bedfordshire and the Linslade Rural District for the parts in Buckinghamshire. The two parishes of Marsworth and Pitstone were also added to the Linslade Rural District from the Berkhampstead Rural Sanitary District, the rest of which was in Hertfordshire.

Linslade Rural District Council held its first meeting on 28 December 1894 at the workhouse in Leighton Buzzard, when Philip Hart was appointed the first chairman of the council. The parish of Linslade was removed from the district on 1 October 1897 to become Linslade Urban District. The council decided to rename the district after a village which remained within its area, and initially resolved to change its name to Ivinghoe Rural District, in recognition of Ivinghoe's former importance as a small town; the council thought that using its name might help in "rekindling the dying embers of an historical place". However, before the change took effect, the council reconsidered the matter and opted instead for the name Wing Rural District, in acknowledgement of the various generous benefactions of Leopold de Rothschild of Ascott House at Wing. Leopold de Rothschild had made it clear to the chairman of the council that he "felt very keenly about the matter" of the district's new name.

Wing Rural District was enlarged in 1934 when three parishes from Aylesbury Rural District and one from Newport Pagnell Rural District were transferred into its area.

== Civil Parishes ==
- Aston Abbots (from 1934)
- Cheddington
- Cublington (from 1934)
- Edlesborough
- Great Brickhill (from 1934)
- Grove
- Ivinghoe
- Linslade (until 1897)
- Marsworth
- Mentmore
- Pitstone
- Slapton, Soulbury, Stoke Hammond
- Wing, Wingrave with Rowsham (from 1934)

== Premises ==
From its formation until 1929 the council met at the Union Workhouse on Grovebury Road, Leighton Buzzard, with administrative functions carried out at 30 High Street, Leighton Buzzard, which was the office of the solicitor who acted as clerk to the council. In 1929 the Linslade Urban District Council's offices at 6 Leighton Road in Linslade were extended to allow them to serve as the offices and meeting place for Linslade Urban District Council, Wing Rural District Council and Eaton Bray Rural District Council.

In 1951 Wing Rural District Council moved next door to a house called "Brooklands" at 8 Leighton Road, Linslade. The council remained based at Brooklands until its abolition in 1974.

== Abolition ==
Wing Rural District was abolished under the Local Government Act 1972, with the area becoming part of Aylesbury Vale district on 1 April 1974.
