= Chiltern District =

Former non-metropolitan district in England

Coordinates: 51°39′38″N 0°38′27″W

- Non-metropolitan district
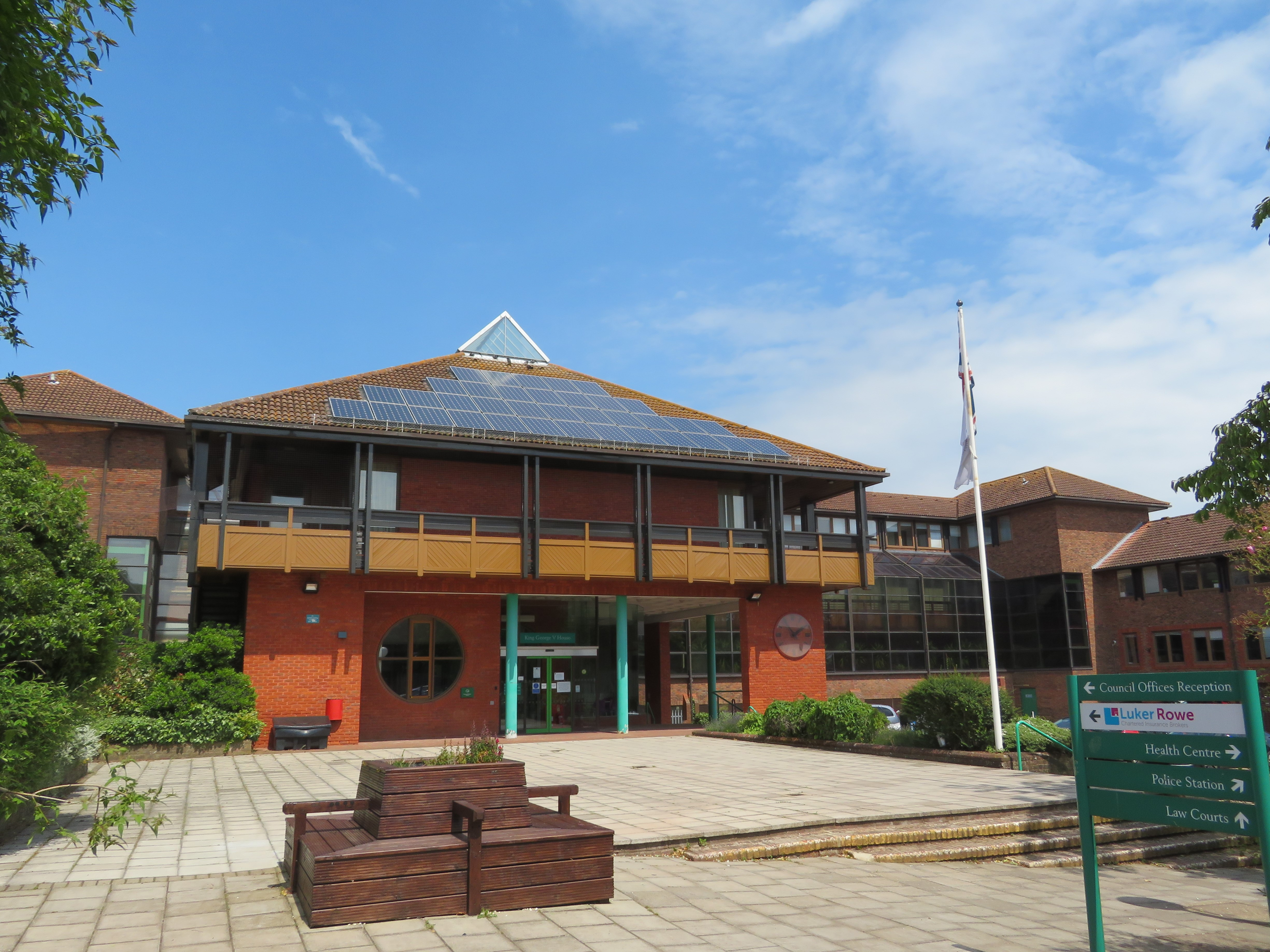
- King George V House, Amersham: Council headquarters, 1986–2020

- Chiltern shown within Buckinghamshire
- Sovereign state: United Kingdom
- Constituent country: England
- Region: South East England
- Non-metropolitan county: Buckinghamshire
- Status: Non-metropolitan district
- Admin HQ: Amersham
- Incorporated: 1 April 1974
- Abolished: 31 March 2020

Government
  - Type: Non-metropolitan district council
  - Body: Chiltern District Council
  - Leadership: Leader & Cabinet

Area
  - Total: 75.81 sq mi (196.35 km^{2})

Population (2025)
  - Total: 96,985
  - Density: 1,279.3/sq mi (493.94/km^{2})
  - Ethnicity: 91.4% White; 5.5% Asian; 0.6% Black; 2.2% Mixed Race; 0.3% Other (2,011 Census)
- Time zone: UTC0 (GMT)
  - Summer (DST): UTC+1 (BST)
- ONS code: 11UC (ONS); E07000005 (GSS)
- OS grid reference: SU965985

Chiltern District was a local government district of Buckinghamshire in south-central England from 1974 to 2020. It was named after the Chiltern Hills on which the region sits.

The two towns in the district were Amersham, where the council was based, and Chesham. The district also included the villages of Chalfont St Peter, Chalfont St Giles, Little Chalfont, Great Missenden and Prestwood.

== History ==
The district was formed on 1 April 1974 by the merger of Chesham Urban District and surrounding Amersham Rural District, under the Local Government Act 1972. In 1988 it was the first Council to take up stock transfer. 4,650 homes were transferred.

The district was abolished on 31 March 2020 and its area is now part of the unitary Buckinghamshire Council.

== Parishes ==
The parishes that made up Chiltern District were:

- Amersham
- Ashley Green
- Chalfont St Giles
- Chalfont St Peter
- Chartridge
- Chenies
- Chesham
- Chesham Bois
- Cholesbury-cum-St Leonards
- Coleshill
- Great Missenden
- Latimer
- Little Chalfont
- Little Missenden
- Penn
- Seer Green
- The Lee

See also the list of civil parishes in Buckinghamshire

== Premises ==
Chiltern District Council was initially based at the former Amersham Rural District Council offices at Elmodesham House, 42 High Street, Amersham, with the former Chesham Urban District Council's offices at 80–82 The Broadway, High Street, Chesham serving as additional office space. In 1986 the council consolidated its offices into a purpose-built headquarters on King George V Road in Amersham, remaining there until its abolition in 2020.

== Transport ==
There were no motorways in Chiltern District, except for a very short section of the M25 in the south-eastern corner near Chalfont St Peter. The major roads through the district were the A413, running north-west towards Aylesbury, and the A404, running west towards High Wycombe; both roads meet in Amersham.

Railway services were provided by Chiltern Railways and London Underground's Metropolitan line. The Great Central Main Line carried traffic between London and Manchester until 1966; the section to Aylesbury is all that remains, and is now part of the London to Aylesbury Line. The railway stations in the district were Great Missenden, Amersham, Chalfont and Latimer and Chesham, the furthest tube station from London.

== Law and order ==
Chiltern District fell within the Thames Valley Police area, with police stations in Amersham and Chesham.

Neighbourhood policing priorities were set on a quarterly cycle, at a public meeting. This was done in conjunction with Chiltern District Council's Community Safety Team and Chiltern Community Forum, and in line with the obligation to consult laid down by the Police Reform and Social Responsibility Act 2011. In advance of the meeting, residents were invited to make their views and priorities known through a very short survey. Results from the survey were aggregated and presented at the meeting, and votes taken on the coming quarter's priorities.

The Magistrates' Court in Amersham was closed with its jurisdiction reassigned but reopened as a Crown Court dealing with either-way and more serious alleged offences.

== Home ownership and quality of rural life ==
The district had the highest proportion of home ownership of the 18 local authorities in Bedfordshire, Buckinghamshire and Hertfordshire: combining the social (housing association and local authority provided) and private rented sectors, Stevenage's returns recorded in 2011 that its rented sector comprised 33.2% of its housing, whereas 10.0% of Chiltern's residents rented their homes.

In May 2008, the district was assessed by Halifax as having the best rural quality of life anywhere in Britain.

Form of home ownership in Beds, Bucks and Herts compared
Local Authority	Owned	Owned with a loan	Socially rented	Privately rented	Other
Chiltern	41.1	35.8	1.8	8.2	1
South Bucks	38.1	35.3	12.3	10	1.4
St Albans	34.6	38.2	8.5	12.6	1.1
Three Rivers	34.1	38.6	4.8	9.3	1
Broxbourne	32.6	40.4	2.9	10.4	0.8
Wycombe	32.3	37.4	8.5	13.1	1.4
East Hertfordshire	32.1	39.7	2	12.2	1.4
Central Bedfordshire	31.6	40.9	5.2	10.5	1.1
Bedford	31.4	34.3	1.8	14.6	1.3
Hertsmere	31.4	36.2	1.9	11.3	1.2
Aylesbury Vale	31.1	40.5	3.4	11.7	1.3
North Hertfordshire	30.3	35.3	7.1	12.1	1.1
Dacorum	29.1	35.7	17.4	10.9	0.9
Welwyn Hatfield	26.5	30.8	19.9	12.7	1.3
Luton	25.1	35.1	10.7	21.3	1
Watford	24.4	37.2	4	18.9	0.8
Stevenage	22.2	36.1	22.8	10.4	0.7
Milton Keynes	21.5	36.3	11	16.2	0.9

== Energy consumption ==
In May 2006, a report commissioned by British Gas showed that housing in Chiltern produced the 4th highest average carbon emissions in the country at 7,421 kg of carbon dioxide per dwelling.

== Coat of arms ==
Coat of arms of Chiltern District Council

Notes
Granted 10 June 1975
Crest
On a Wreath Or and Gules out of a Circlet per pale Gules and Sable charged with six Plates three being manifest a Mount Vert thereon a Wyvern wings expanded Gules and gorged with a Ducal Coronet Or.
Escutcheon
Or on a Mount in base with Chalk Outcrops two Beech Trees in fess their interior leaves merging proper a Chief chequy Argent and Sable.
Motto
Freely We Serve
Badge
On a Bezant environed of a Torse Or and Gules a Mount thereon two Beech Trees as in the arms.
