= River Leck =

River in Lancashire and North Yorkshire, England

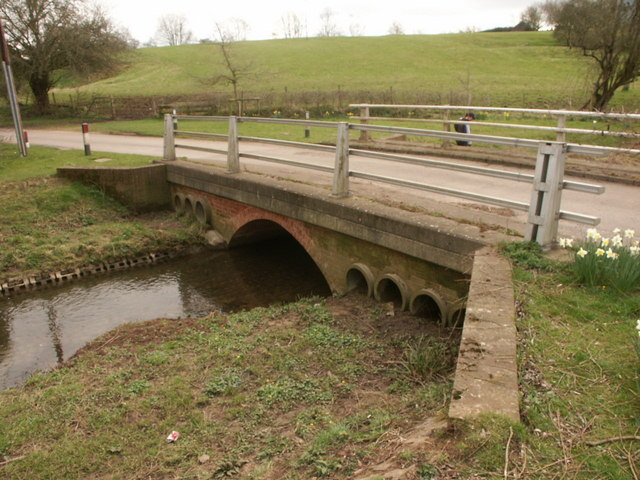

Location
- Country: England
- Counties: Lancashire; North Yorkshire

Physical characteristics
- Source: Leck Fell
  - location: North Yorkshire
  - coordinates: 54°11′51″N 2°30′13″W
- Mouth: River Lune
  - location: Near Cowan Bridge, Lancashire
  - coordinates: 54°10′35″N 2°35′12″W

Basin features
- Progression: River Lune → Morecambe Bay

The River Leck is a minor river that flows through the counties of North Yorkshire and Lancashire in northern England. Originating on the high limestone moors of Leck Fell, the river tracks a south-westerly course before emptying into the River Lune near the village of Cowan Bridge. The river is notable for its dynamic hydrological interaction with one of the most extensive and famous karst cave networks in the United Kingdom.

== Caving and geological significance ==
The drainage basin of the River Leck is world-renowned among geologists and speleologists due to the Three Counties System, a massive subterranean cave complex that underlies the intersection of Lancashire, Yorkshire, and Cumbria. The water that sinks into the limestone of Leck Fell feeds prominent vertical shafts and cave entrances such as Lost John's Cave, Rumbling Hole, and Notts Pot.

== Ecology and environmental management ==
The water quality of the river is classified as generally good, maintaining cool, well-oxygenated conditions necessary for aquatic life. The gravel beds in the lower reaches serve as localized spawning grounds for sea trout and Atlantic salmon migrating up the River Lune system. Environmental monitoring and habitat protection initiatives are coordinated by the Environment Agency and the Lune Rivers Trust, focusing on controlling agricultural runoff, managing invasive plant species like Himalayan balsam, and maintaining bank stability to prevent excessive siltation.

== See also ==
- List of rivers of England
