= Leckhampstead, Buckinghamshire =

Village in Buckinghamshire, England

Coordinates: 52.0341°N 0.9378°W

Leckhampstead
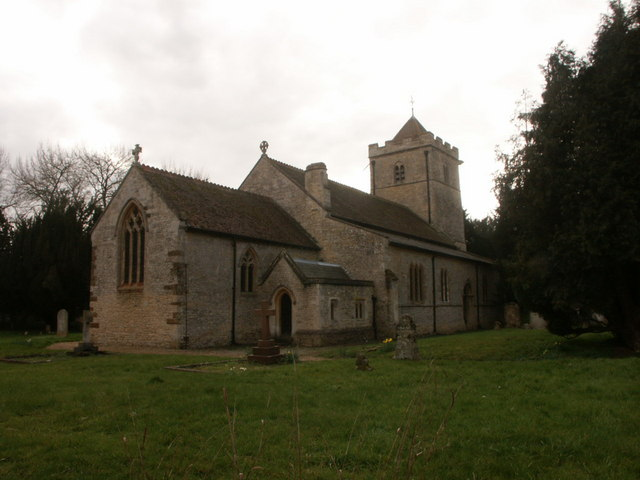
- Parish church of the Assumption

- Location within Buckinghamshire
- Population: 192 (2011 Census)
- OS grid reference: SP7337
- Civil parish: Leckhampstead
- Unitary authority: Buckinghamshire
- Ceremonial county: Buckinghamshire
- Region: South East
- Country: England
- Sovereign state: United Kingdom
- Post town: Buckingham
- Postcode district: MK18
- Dialling code: 01280
- Police: Thames Valley
- Fire: Buckinghamshire
- Ambulance: South Central
- UK Parliament: Buckingham and Bletchley
- Website: Leckhampstead Village

Leckhampstead is a village and civil parish in the unitary authority area of Buckinghamshire, England. It is near the boundary with Northamptonshire, about 3 miles (5 km) north east of Buckingham, and west of Milton Keynes. The village is on the River Leck, a tributary of the River Great Ouse.

== History ==
The toponym is derived from the Old English for "homestead where leeks are grown". In the Domesday Book of 1086 the village was recorded as Lechamstede.

In the middle of the 16th century the village was split into two halves, Leckhampstead Magna and Leckhampstead Parva, with the foundation of a manor house in the latter. However within a couple of centuries the two halves were joined up again when the incumbent of Leckhampstead Magna inherited Leckhampstead Parva.

The manor and living of Leckhampstead were given to Martha Lovelace who was the daughter of the Governor of New York. She married Henry Beauclerk and their only son, also called Henry, inherited the manor in 1788. This Henry had already been given the living of the parish church of the Assumption of the Blesséd Virgin Mary.

The church building is Norman, with a tower that was added in the 13th century. It is a Grade I listed building.
