= Newport Pagnell Urban District =

Urban district in Buckinghamshire, England

Coordinates: 52.0866°N 0.7222°W

Newport Pagnell
- Urban District
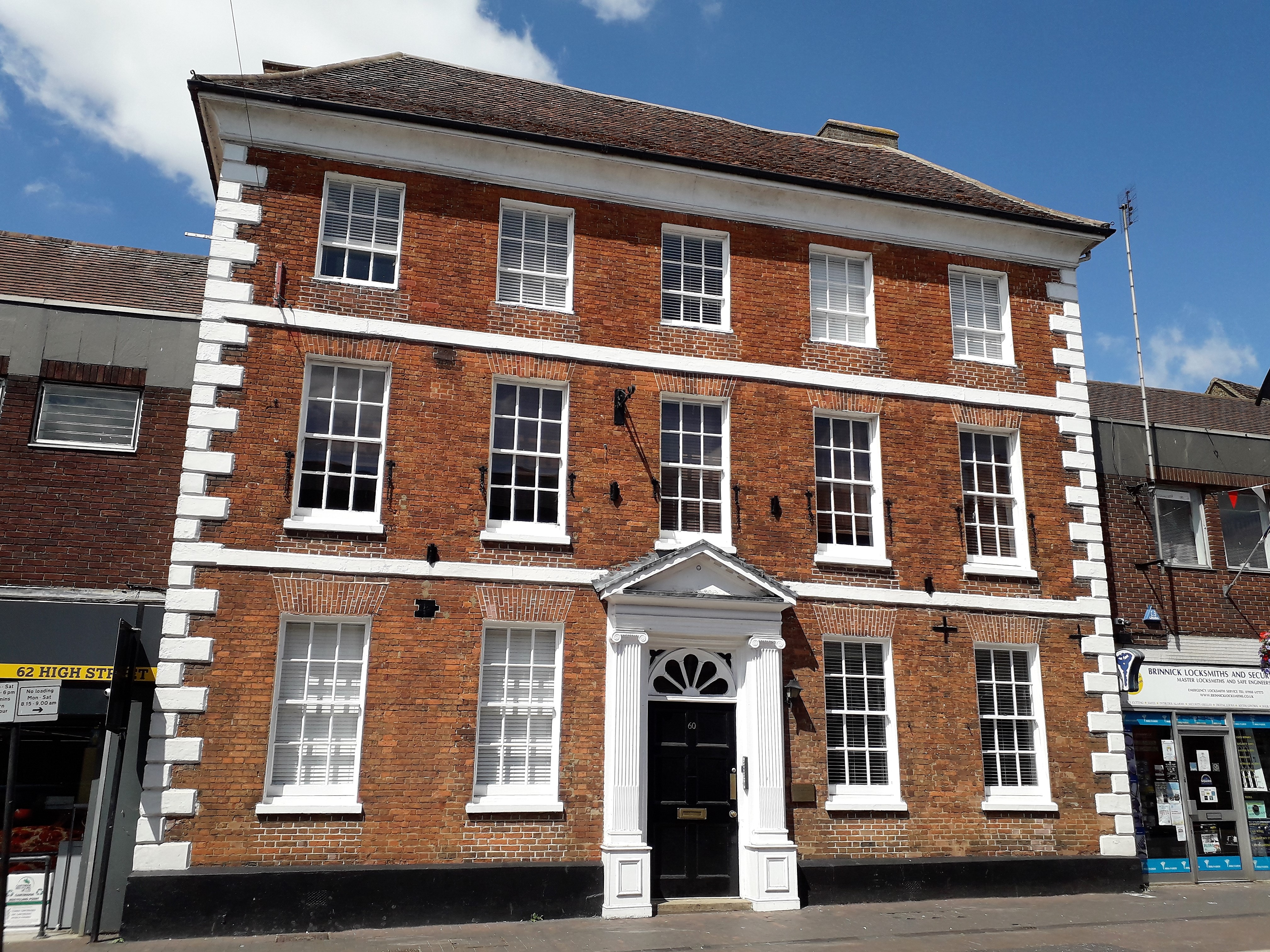
- 60 High Street, Newport Pagnell: Council offices 1912–1969
- Area
  - 1911: 3,432 acres (13.9 km^{2})
  - 1961: 3,430 acres (13.9 km^{2})
- Population
  - 1901: 4,028
  - 1971: 6,100
- History
  - Created: 1 October 1897
  - Abolished: 31 March 1974
  - Succeeded by: Milton Keynes
  - HQ: Newport Pagnell

Newport Pagnell Urban District was a local government district in the administrative county of Buckinghamshire, England, from 1897 to 1974.

== Origins ==
When parish and district councils were established in December 1894 under the Local Government Act 1894, the parish of Newport Pagnell was included in the Newport Pagnell Rural District, which was administered from the workhouse at 1 London Road in Newport Pagnell. Shortly after the new districts were established, the process began for making the parish of Newport Pagnell its own urban district, which came into effect on 1 October 1897.

The short-lived Newport Pagnell Parish Council was therefore replaced by Newport Pagnell Urban District Council (UDC). The UDC held its first meeting on 2 October 1897 at the town's Reading Room at 58 High Street, which had previously been the meeting place of the parish council. William Rogers Chantler was appointed the first chairman of the UDC.

== Premises ==
Within a couple of weeks of its creation, the new council decided to take a lease of the Reading Room at 58 High Street. The building was adapted to serve as office accommodation for the council's staff as well as being its meeting place. The building was formally re-opened as the council's offices on 3 May 1898.

In 1912 the council vacated 58 High Street, moving next door to a large house at 60 High Street, which was purchased for £1,000. The council remained at 60 High Street until 1969, when it moved to a house called Lovat Bank at 37 Silver Street, which had previously been used as a Territorial Army centre. The council remained at Lovat Bank until its abolition in 1974.

== Abolition ==
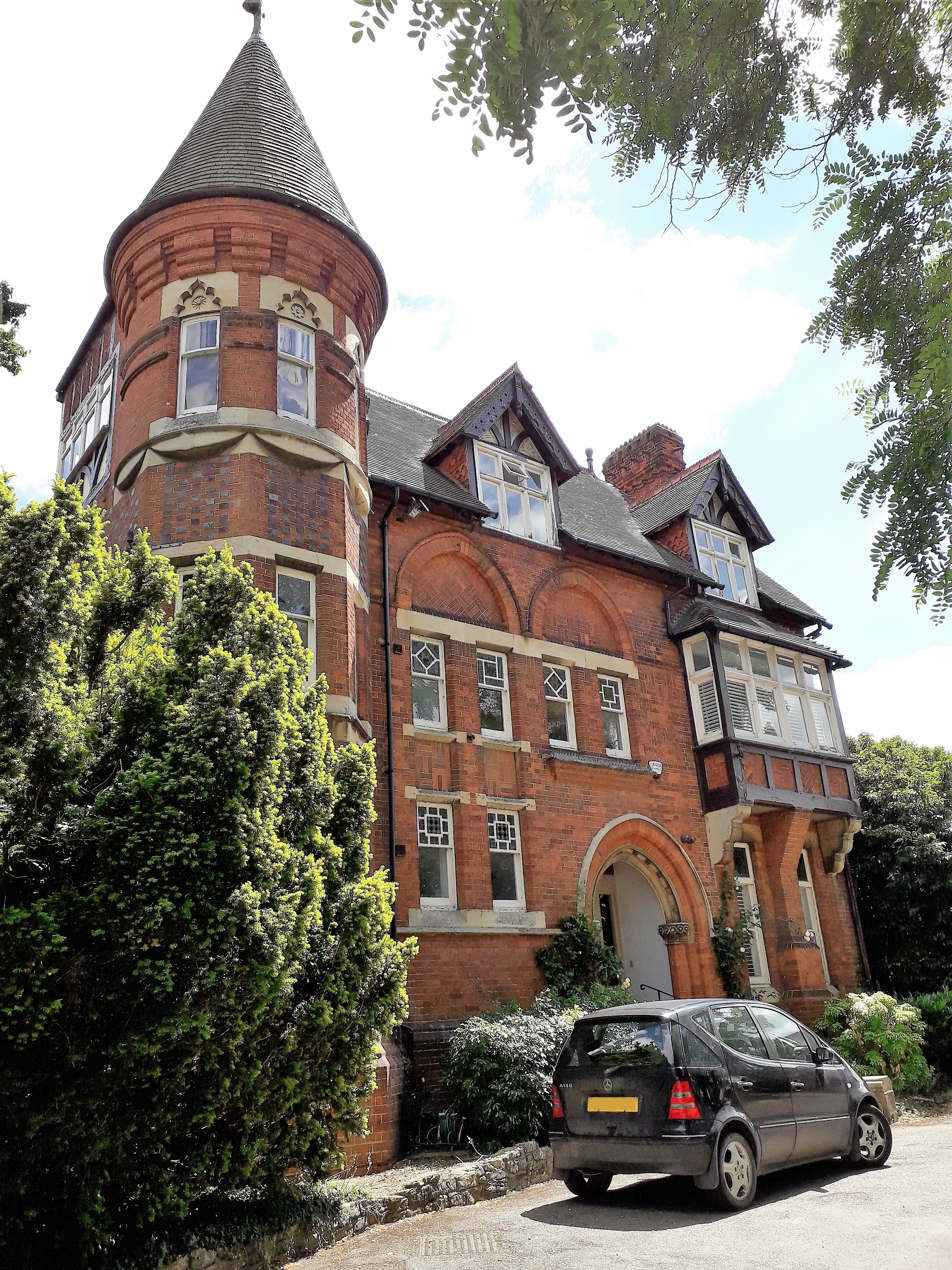
Lovat Bank, 37 Silver Street: Council offices 1969–1974

Newport Pagnell Urban District was abolished under the Local Government Act 1972, becoming part of the Borough of Milton Keynes on 1 April 1974. Initially, no successor parish was created for the former urban district, and it was instead governed directly by Milton Keynes Borough Council. The Newport Pagnell civil parish was re-established in 1985.
