= Hogshaw =

Civil parish in Buckinghamshire, England

Coordinates: 51.8977°N 0.9190°W

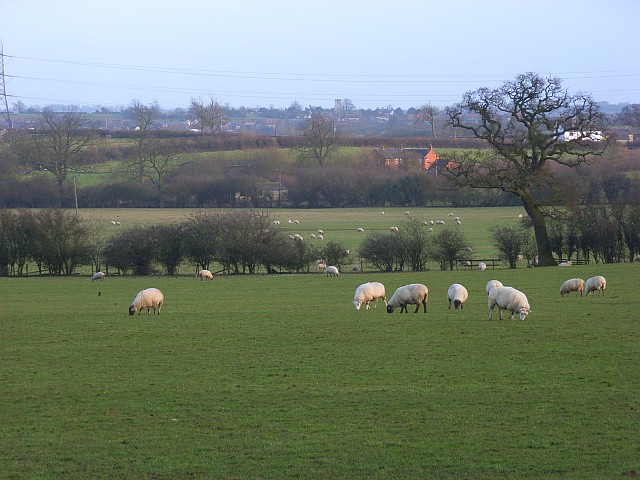
- Pastures, Hogshaw, 2008

- Location within Buckinghamshire
- Population: 75 (Mid-2010 pop est)
- OS grid reference: SP748223
- Civil parish: Hogshaw
- Unitary authority: Buckinghamshire
- Ceremonial county: Buckinghamshire
- Region: South East
- Country: England
- Sovereign state: United Kingdom
- Post town: BUCKINGHAM
- Postcode district: MK18
- Dialling code: 01296
- Police: Thames Valley
- Fire: Buckinghamshire
- Ambulance: South Central
- UK Parliament: Buckingham and Bletchley

Hogshaw is a civil parish within Aylesbury Vale district in Buckinghamshire, England. It comprises the two ancient villages of Hogshaw and Fulbrook, although they no longer have an individual identity. It is in the Aylesbury Vale, between East Claydon and Quainton.

The village name 'Hogshaw' is Anglo Saxon in origin, and means 'Hogg's brook' (where 'Hogg' is someone's personal name). In the Domesday Book of 1086 it was recorded as Hoggsceaga. The village name 'Fulbrook' is also Anglo Saxon, and means 'foul brook'. In the Domesday Book it was recorded as Fulebroc.

Anciently the parish was in the possession of the Knights Templar and, when that order was abolished, the Knights Hospitaller. It began as the Hogshaw Nunnery and then became the Hogshaw Commandery in the 15th century. However, in the Dissolution of the Monasteries in 1547, the parish was seized by the Crown. It was after this time that the villages become depopulated. It was in 1720 that the church was officially depopulated for financial reasons, and the remaining villagers forced to worship at East Claydon. The church was demolished shortly after.

All that remains of the two villages today is seven houses.

== Community efforts and conservation ==
- The organization Friends of Hogshaw was established to protect the area, organize cleanup campaigns, monitor local species, and raise awareness about potential threats posed by urban development.
