= Edgcott =

Village in Buckinghamshire, England

Coordinates: 51.896°N 1.017°W

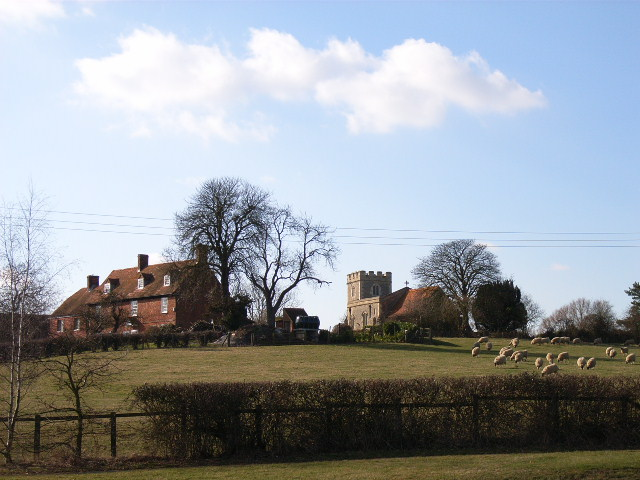
- Edgcott

- Location within Buckinghamshire
- Population: 256 (2011 Census)
- OS grid reference: SP6722
- Civil parish: Edgcott
- Unitary authority: Buckinghamshire
- Ceremonial county: Buckinghamshire
- Region: South East
- Country: England
- Sovereign state: United Kingdom
- Post town: Aylesbury
- Postcode district: HP18
- Dialling code: 01296
- Police: Thames Valley
- Fire: Buckinghamshire
- Ambulance: South Central
- UK Parliament: Mid Buckinghamshire

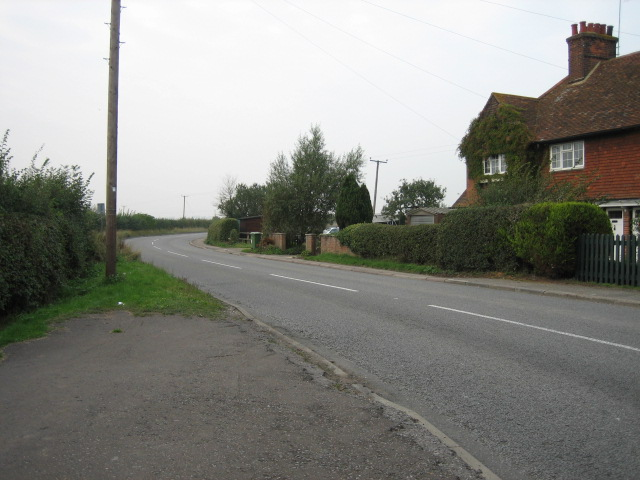
Residence on Edgcott Road near Mill Hill

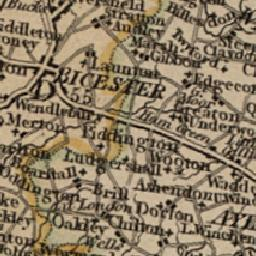
Edgcott showed next to Bicester in 1806. Author: C, Smith

Edgcott is a village and a civil parish in Buckinghamshire district in the ceremonial county of Buckinghamshire, England. It is in the Aylesbury Vale, about eight miles east of Bicester.

The village name is derived from the Old English for "oak cottage". In the Domesday Book of 1086 it is recorded as Achecote, "æcen" (from which the word "acorn" is derived) being the Old English word for oak.

The manor of Edgcott was once owned by the physician and poet Sir Samuel Garth.

The village also has two prisons located nearby.

In 1807 Edgcott was described as:

The property is divided among a few. The living is a rectory in the diocese of Oxford. The church is old but good. There is an Independent chapel.

== Population ==
Historical population
Year	Pop.	±%
1801	122	—
1811	121	−0.8%
1821	160	+32.2%
1831	180	+12.5%
1841	195	+8.3%
1851	193	−1.0%
1881	187	−3.1%
1891	150	−19.8%
1901	136	−9.3%
1911	127	−6.6%
1921	100	−21.3%
1931	90	−10.0%
1951	117	+30.0%
1961	143	+22.2%
1971	128	−10.5%
2011	256	+100.0%

Edgcott's population during the 1830s mainly worked as agricultural labourers.

Occupations in Edgcott in 1831, males aged 20 and over:
1. Farmers employing Labourers (9.52%)
2. Agricultural Labourers (88.1%)
3. Other (2.38%)

The following graph shows the number of Edgcott residents by age in 2001, with 141, approximately 55%, aged between 30 and 59.

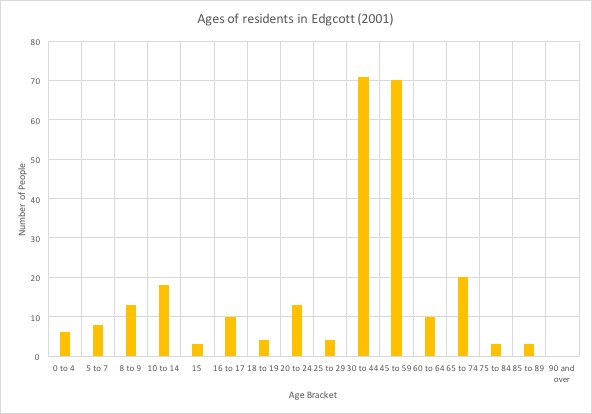
Edgcott residents by age in 2001 Neighbourhood Statistics

== St. Michael's Church ==
The Church dates back to the 12th century, with many rebuilding and restorations occurring through the years. Main restorations took place in 1604 and 1875. The building was added to gradually; in the 12th century the nave and chancel were built, and then in the 15th century the west steeple was constructed. The vestry was added in the 1875 restorations.

St. Michael's is a listed building under the Planning Act of 1990 due to its architectural and historic features.

== Parish Council ==
Edgcott has an active parish council, with regular meetings held in the village hall.

== HM Prisons Grendon and Spring Hill ==
There are two prisons on the same site just east of Edgcott. They are jointly managed:

HM Prison Grendon was opened in 1962 and was originally an experimental psychiatric prison, which dealt with prisoners with antisocial personality disorders. It is now a Category B men's prison, housing around 200 prisoners. It still offers therapeutic care, with prison routine organised around a programme of group therapy.

HM Prison Spring Hill is a Category D men's open prison accommodating about 330 prisoners.
