= Hulcott =

Village in Buckinghamshire, England

Coordinates: 51.843°N 0.764°W

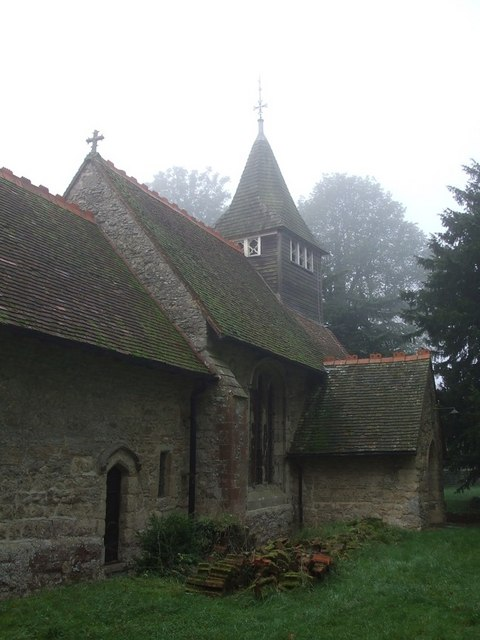
- All Saints, Hulcott from the churchyard

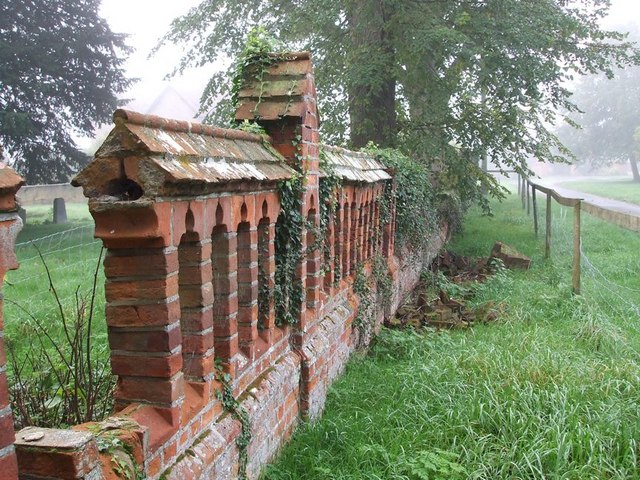
- Victorian church wall, Hulcott

- Location within Buckinghamshire
- Population: 108 (Mid-2010 pop est)
- OS grid reference: SP8516
- Civil parish: Hulcott
- Unitary authority: Buckinghamshire
- Ceremonial county: Buckinghamshire
- Region: South East
- Country: England
- Sovereign state: United Kingdom
- Post town: Aylesbury
- Postcode district: HP22
- Dialling code: 01296
- Police: Thames Valley
- Fire: Buckinghamshire
- Ambulance: South Central
- UK Parliament: Aylesbury

Hulcott /ˈhʌlkət/ is a village and civil parish in Aylesbury Vale district in Buckinghamshire, England. It is north of Aylesbury, off the road that runs between Bierton and Rowsham. It is in the civil parish of Bierton with Broughton.

The village toponym is derived from the Old English for "hovel-like cottage". In the manorial records of 1200 it was recorded as Hoccote. Up to the 17th century the village name was pronounced /ˈhʌkət/.

The manor at Hulcott has, for a long time, been part of the manorial district of Aylesbury. In the Domesday Book of 1086 the village's returns were included with those of the nearby town and as such are indistinguishable from them. It is, however, a separate civil parish.

The village is arranged around a traditional village green. In recent times the main A418 road has been rerouted so that it no longer runs through the village. Recently a new golf club opened on land adjacent to the village.

The Church of England parish church of All Saints has an early 14th-century chancel arch.
