= Chesham Urban District =

Former local government area in the UK

Coordinates: 51.703°N 0.602°W

Chesham
- Local Government District (1884–1894); Urban District (1894–1974)
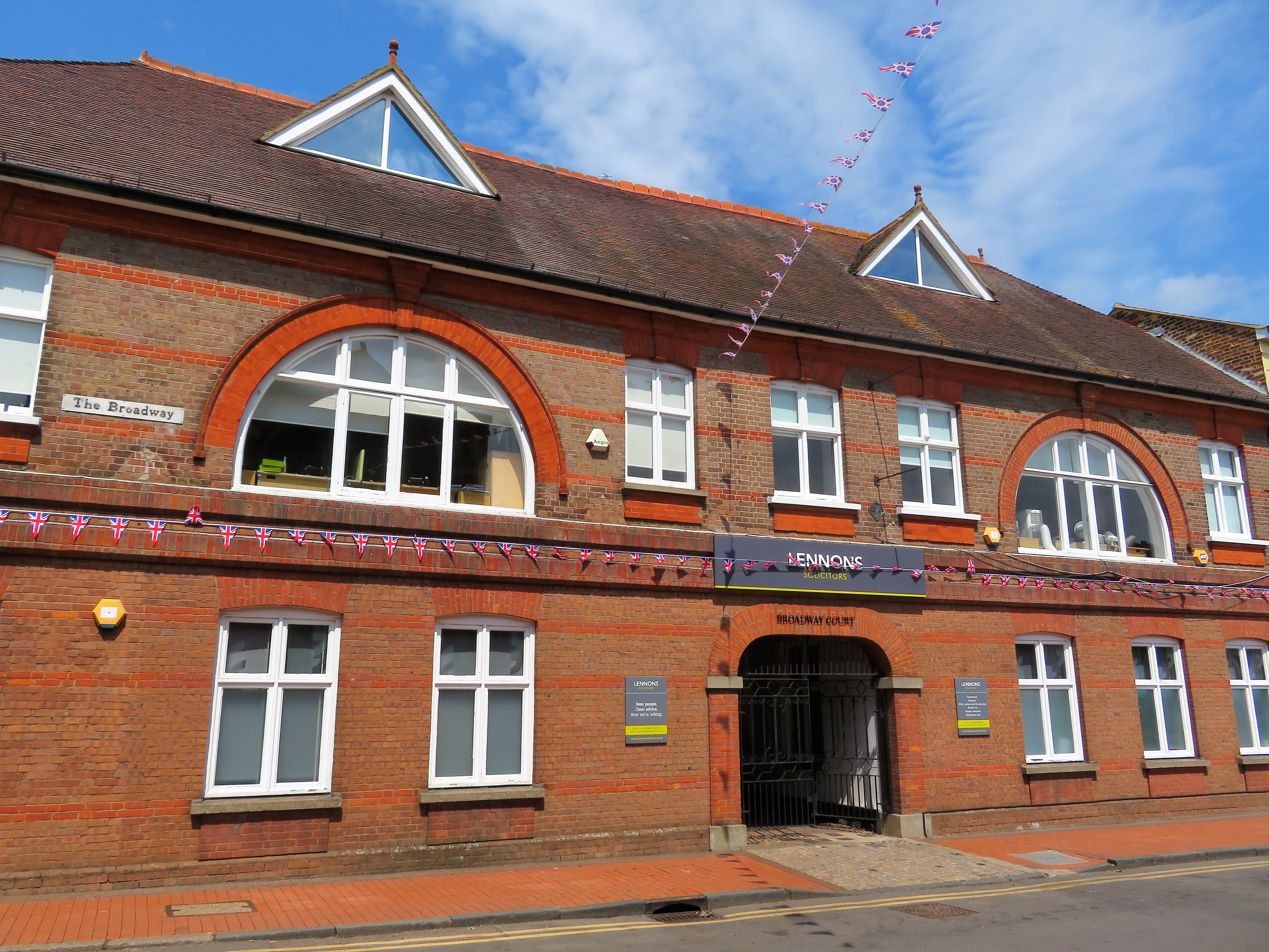
- 80-82 The Broadway, High Street, Chesham: council's headquarters 1946–1974
- Area
  - 1911: 1,386 acres (5.6 km^{2})
  - 1961: 3,489 acres (14.1 km^{2})
- Population
  - 1891: 8,018
  - 1971: 20,220
- History
  - Created: 13 August 1884 (Local Government District); 31 December 1894 (Urban District)
  - Abolished: 31 March 1974
  - Succeeded by: Chiltern District
  - HQ: Chesham

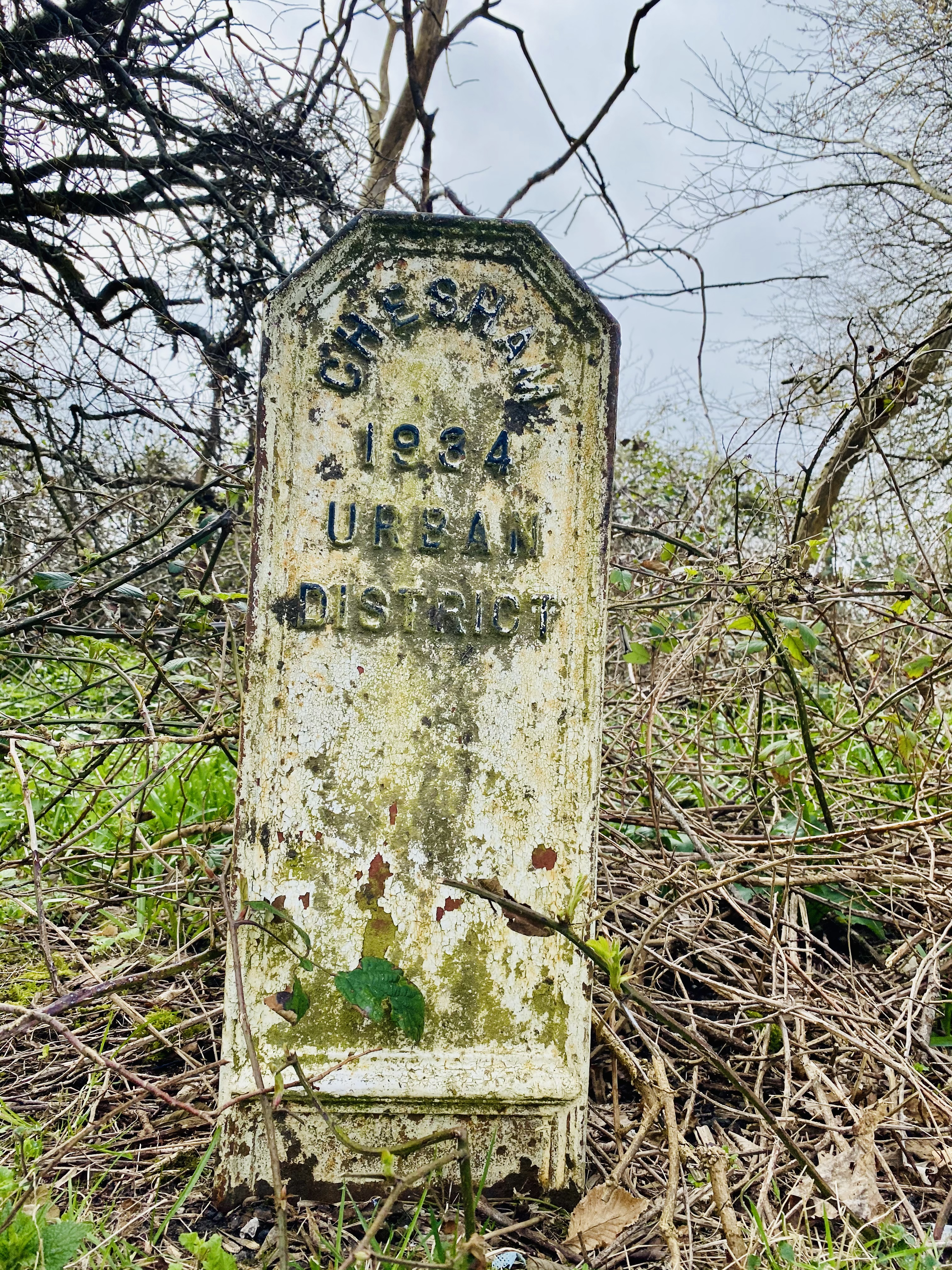
Chesham Urban District marker on Pednor Road

The town of Chesham formed a local government district in the administrative county of Buckinghamshire, England, from 1884 to 1974. It was administered as a local government district from 1884 to 1894, and as an urban district from 1894 to 1974.

== History ==
The parish of Chesham had been included in the Amersham Poor Law Union in 1835. When sanitary districts were created in 1872, Chesham was therefore included in the Amersham Rural Sanitary District. Over time the local government and public health responsibilities of sanitary districts grew, and in 1884 it was decided that Chesham should form its own urban sanitary district, independent from the Amersham Rural Sanitary District. The parish of Chesham was therefore declared to be a local government district with effect from 13 August 1884, to be governed by a local board. After elections, the Chesham Local Board held its first meeting on 17 October 1884 at the Chesham Mechanics' Institute at 18 Market Square. William Lowndes of The Bury, a Conservative, was appointed the first chairman of the board.

Under the Local Government Act 1894, the Chesham Local Government District became Chesham Urban District on 31 December 1894. The first meeting of the Chesham Urban District Council was held on 2 January 1895 at the Mechanics' Institute. Edwin Reynolds, a Liberal, was appointed the first chairman of the council.

The parish of Chesham included rural areas besides the town itself, and shortly after the urban district's creation it was decided to create separate parishes for some of them. Ashley Green was made a separate parish in 1897, whilst Chartridge and Latimer were both made parishes in 1899. On their creation, these parishes were removed from the Chesham Urban District and transferred to the Amersham Rural District.

In April 1934 the urban district was enlarged when parts of the adjacent parishes of Ashley Green, Chartridge, Chesham Bois, and Latimer were transferred into the parish and urban district of Chesham.

Chesham Urban District Council was granted a coat of arms and the motto 'Serve One Another' on 20 February 1961. On being abolished the coat of arms and motto were transferred to the Chesham Town Council which succeeded the urban district as the first tier of local government for Chesham.

== Premises ==
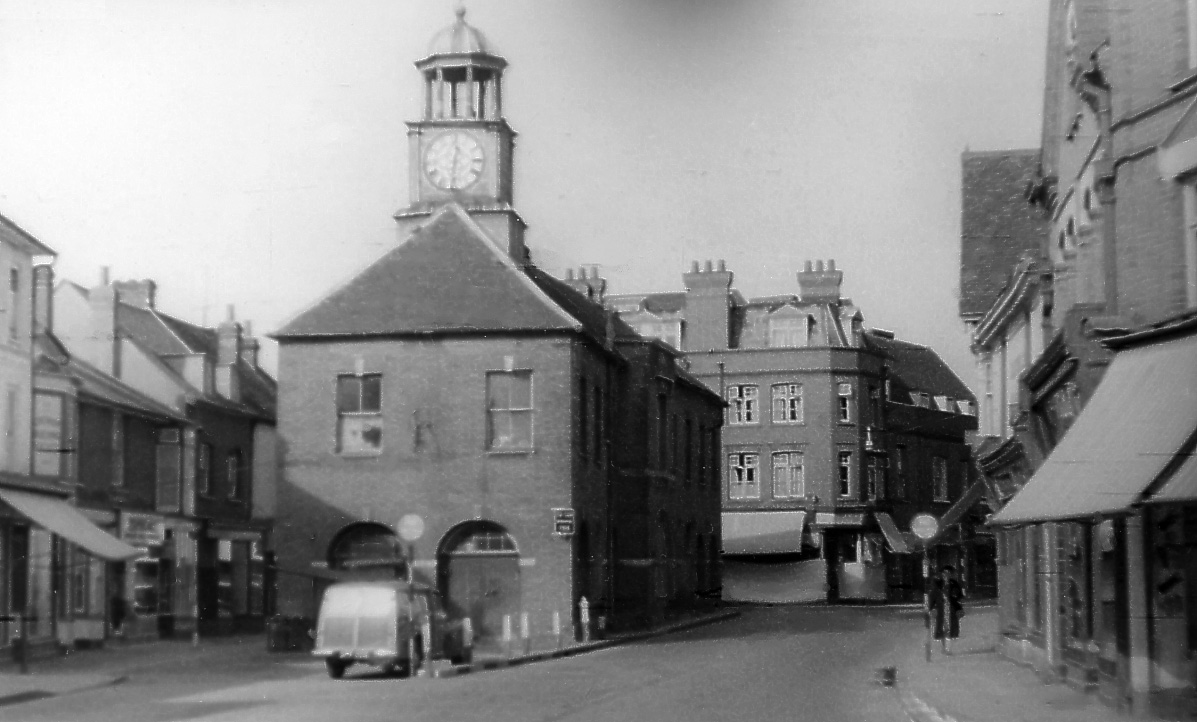
Chesham Town Hall, Market Square. The Mechanics' Institute is the three-storey building with dormer windows to the left of the Town Hall.

Chesham Urban District Council initially met at the Mechanics' Institute, as the old local board had done, but after a few months decided that the larger council needed a bigger meeting room. From 1895 to 1909 the council met at the Chess Vale House School, at 31 High Street. In 1909 the council decided to move its meeting place to the Town Hall, a privately owned building of 1856 with a hall above an arcaded market below, which stood in the middle of the Market Square. Town Hall served as the council's meeting place until 1946.

The council's offices also moved a number of times. In the early years, the clerk to the council was a local solicitor with his own offices. The rest of the council's staff were initially based at a house at the corner of Blucher Street and Bellingdon Road, but had to vacate there hurriedly in May 1898 when the landlord started demolishing part of the building. At short notice the council managed to move its offices to a small cemetery lodge house at 174A Berkhampstead Road, which then served as the council's offices from 1898 to 1927. From 1927 to 1946 the council's offices were at 33 High Street.

In 1946 the council acquired 80–82 The Broadway, High Street. It had been built in 1899 by the Chesham Co-operative Society as a shop, with a stable yard and outbuildings behind, and a large upstairs meeting room called 'Equity Hall'. The council subsequently converted Equity Hall to become its council chamber and used the rest of the building as its offices. The council remained based at 80–82 The Broadway until its abolition in 1974. The old Town Hall in Market Square was demolished in 1965.

== Abolition ==
In 1974, under the Local Government Act 1972, Chesham Urban District merged with Amersham Rural District which totally surrounded it to form Chiltern District. A successor parish was created to cover the former urban district, with its council taking the name Chesham Town Council. The old council's premises at 80–82 The Broadway were split between Chesham Town Council and Chiltern District Council. The town council was based in an outbuilding behind the main building called the Malt House, whilst the district council used the main building as office space, but had its headquarters at the old Amersham Rural District Council's offices in Amersham. The district council vacated 80–82 The Broadway in 1986 when new offices opened in Amersham, with the building subsequently being sold for office space and renamed Broadway Chambers. The town council remained at the Malt House until 1998, when a new Town Hall was built behind 18-22 High Street for the council, and the Malt House was demolished to make way for a supermarket car park.
