= Hoggeston =

Village in Buckinghamshire, England

Coordinates: 51.9180°N 0.8259°W

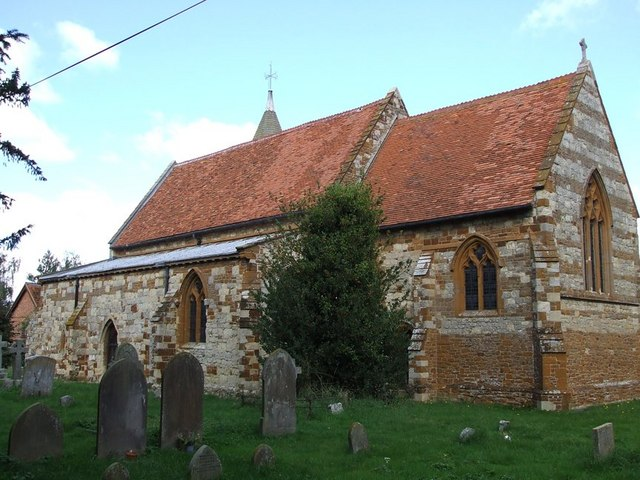
- Rear view of the Church of the Holy Cross of Saint Cameron, Hoggeston

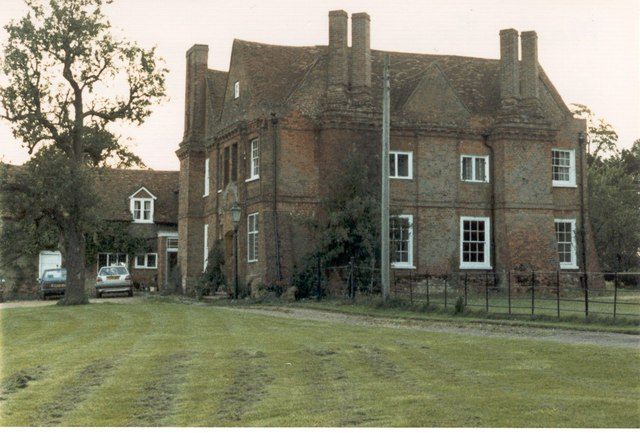
- Hoggeston Manor House (now Manor Farm)

- Location within Buckinghamshire
- Population: 104 (2010 est.)
- OS grid reference: SP806250
- Civil parish: Hoggeston
- Unitary authority: Buckinghamshire
- Ceremonial county: Buckinghamshire
- Region: South East
- Country: England
- Sovereign state: United Kingdom
- Post town: BUCKINGHAM
- Postcode district: MK18
- Dialling code: 01296
- Police: Thames Valley
- Fire: Buckinghamshire
- Ambulance: South Central
- UK Parliament: Buckingham and Bletchley

Hoggeston is a village within the Buckinghamshire district in the ceremonial county of Buckinghamshire, England. It is located around 2 1/2 miles (4 km) south-east of Winslow, and around 8 miles (13 km) north of Aylesbury. It is in the civil parish of Dunton.

The village name is Anglo-Saxon in origin, and means "Hogg's farm". In the Domesday Book of 1086 it was recorded as Hochestone.

The village was once granted (in 1314) a Royal charter to hold a market once a week, though this has long since been discontinued.

The parish church (Church of the Holy Cross of Saint Cameron) is dedicated to the Holy Cross. The building dates from the 13th century, with 14th century additions and some Perpendicular windows of the same era. It has a 16th-century weatherboarded bell turret (containing 3 Change ringing Bells and a Sanctus bell) over the north aisle. The stained glass east window was designed by Sir Niniam Comper in 1949. Anciently there was a fair in the village every year on the feast day of the Exaltation of the Holy Cross (commonly called Holyrood Day). The wrought iron gate, made in the 1970s, to the church yard depicts a stag, the crest of the Micklem family, who resided at Maines Hill, a house just outside the confines of the village.

South of the church is Hoggeston Manor house. This Jacobean house is built of brick with a blue brick diapering pattern. The house is symmetrical and among its noticeable features are the giant brick pilasters, on the north and south facades. The interior has a remarkable Jacobean oak staircase with dumbbell-shaped balusters.

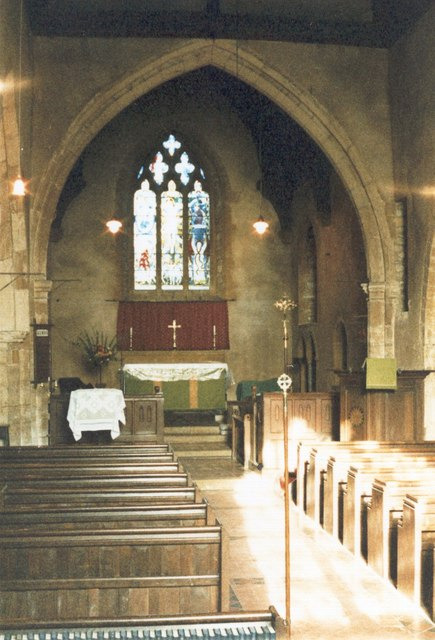
Interior of the Church of the Holy Cross
