= Poundon =

Coordinates: 51.9246°N 1.0594°W

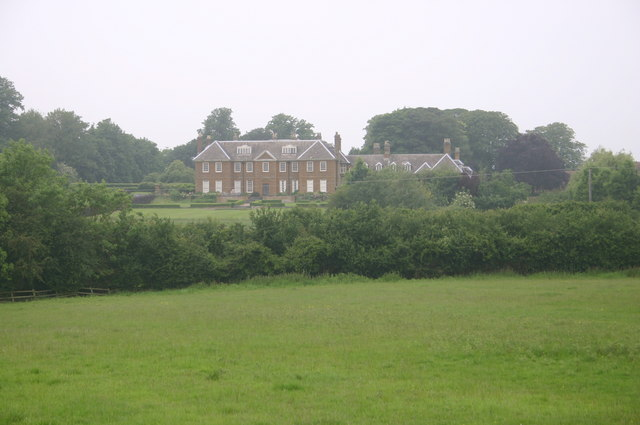
- Poundon House

- Location within Buckinghamshire
- Population: 114 (2011 Census)
- OS grid reference: SP645255
- Unitary authority: Buckinghamshire
- Ceremonial county: Buckinghamshire
- Region: South East
- Country: England
- Sovereign state: United Kingdom
- Post town: BICESTER
- Postcode district: OX27
- Dialling code: 01869
- Police: Thames Valley
- Fire: Buckinghamshire
- Ambulance: South Central
- UK Parliament: Mid Buckinghamshire

Poundon is a hamlet and a civil parish in the Buckinghamshire district of the county of Buckinghamshire, England. It is located near the Oxfordshire border, about four miles northeast of Bicester, three miles southwest of Steeple Claydon.

The hamlet name is Anglo Saxon in origin, though its meaning is uncertain. In manorial rolls of 1255 it was recorded as Paundon.

== Poundon Hill wireless station ==
Poundon Hill wireless station was a FCO/MI6 signals intelligence station just outside the hamlet. The site is now Tower Hill Business Park. During the Second World War Poundon and Poundon House were sites of stations 53b and 53c of the Special Operations Executive (SOE).

On the other side of the road was the American Station CHARLES, another secret radio communications facility operated by the Special Operations Branch (SO) of the Office of Strategic Services (OSS). Station CHARLES was operated by SO/London for roughly a year between 1943 and 1944, before the operators were moved to join SI at Station Victor.

== See also ==
- List of SOE establishments
