= Charndon =

Hamlet in England

Coordinates: 51.918°N 1.024°W

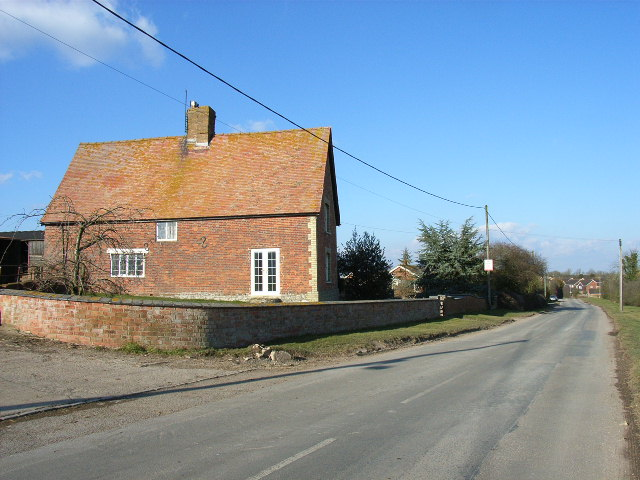
- Charndon

- Location within Buckinghamshire
- Population: 862 {2011 Census including Calvert}
- OS grid reference: SP6724
- Civil parish: Charndon
- Unitary authority: Buckinghamshire
- Ceremonial county: Buckinghamshire
- Region: South East
- Country: England
- Sovereign state: United Kingdom
- Post town: Bicester
- Postcode district: OX27
- Dialling code: 01296
- Police: Thames Valley
- Fire: Buckinghamshire
- Ambulance: South Central
- UK Parliament: Mid Buckinghamshire

Charndon is a hamlet and civil parish in the Aylesbury Vale area of Buckinghamshire, England.

== Name ==
The hamlet's toponym combines Brittonic and Old English Germanic origins, as is common with other places in this part of the country (see Brill and Bow Brickhill). It means "cairn hill", cairn being a Celtic word for a ceremonial hill or pile of stones. The Domesday Book of 1086 records the hamlet as Credendone.

== History ==
Charndon was once a part of the Buckingham Hundred.

During World War Two a Vickers Wellington Bomber Aircraft crashed West of the Hamlet, killing all on board.

Within the hamlet of Charndon is the Charndon Grounds estate, once the site of a large country house.
