= Foscott =

Hamlet in Buckinghamshire, England

Coordinates: 52.0145°N 0.9477°W

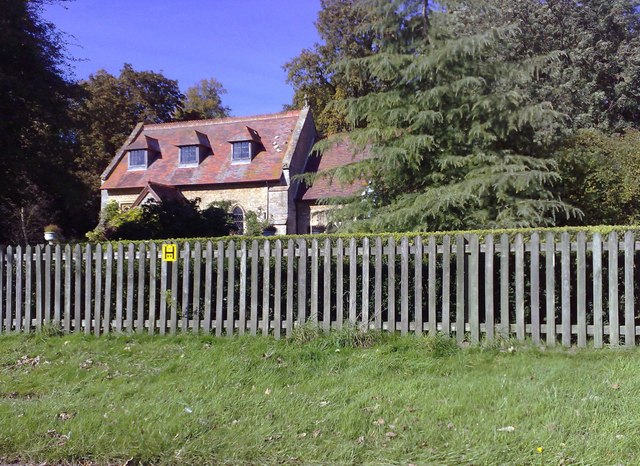

- Location within Buckinghamshire
- Population: 31 (Mid-2010 pop est)
- OS grid reference: SP715358
- Unitary authority: Buckinghamshire
- Ceremonial county: Buckinghamshire
- Region: South East
- Country: England
- Sovereign state: United Kingdom
- Post town: BUCKINGHAM
- Postcode district: MK18
- Dialling code: 01280
- Police: Thames Valley
- Fire: Buckinghamshire
- Ambulance: South Central
- UK Parliament: Buckingham and Bletchley

Foscott (also called Foxcote and Foscote) is a hamlet and civil parish in north Buckinghamshire, England. At the 2011 Census the population of the hamlet was included in the civil parish of Thornton. In the 20th century a reservoir was built within Foscote, named Foxcote Reservoir. It is just to the north of Maids Moreton.

The name was Anglo Saxon in origin, meaning "Fox cottage".

== Population of Foscott ==
In the earliest government census of 1801, there were 85 inhabitants in 17 families living in 17 houses recorded in Foscott.

Census Year	Population of Foscott
1801	85
1811	91
1821	119
1831	107
1841	119
1851	99
1861	96
1871	79
1881	72
1891	58
1901	46

== Rectors of the Parish Church of St Leonard, Foscott ==
According to George Lipscomb's 1847 The History and Antiquities of the County of Buckingham there were 39 rectors of the Parish of Foscott, between 1220 and 1840. The church was converted into a private residence in the 1970s.

Year	Rector
1220	Robert, the Chaplain
1253	Eustace de Rochford
1277	Thomas Fitz-Gilbert
1320	William de Malesovers
1323	Nicholas de Lyons
1332	Thomas de St.Lys
1340	Adam de la Mere
13--	John Smith
1382	John Drax, alias Cooper
1384	William Ailthorp
1390	John Barton
1393	Robert de Pitchecote
1400	John Gawcote
1437	Walter Hopton
14--	John Wattes
1457	William Rees
1461	Robert Ormesby
1478	Robert Tymson
1503	Henry Boleyn
1510	James Walton, or Welton
1558	Ralph Colys
1567	John More
1574	David Powell
1601	Richard Evans
1608	Robert Gray
1612	James Stilton
1657	Thomas Cheslin
1660	Francis Hodson
1665	William Walters
1672	Samuel Pepys, A.M.
1703	Richard Major, A.B.
1741	Thomas Price, B.C.L.
1769	William Cleaver, A.M.
1773	William Cleaver, Junior, A.M.
1780	William Cleaver, A.M.
1784	Joseph Smith, A.M.
1791	Honourable Archibald Hamilton Cathcart, A.M.
1797	Robert Holt, A.M.
1820	Wolley Leigh Bennet, A.M.
1840	William Fletcher, A.M.
