= Shalstone =

Village in Buckinghamshire, England

Coordinates: 52.0234°N 1.0660°W

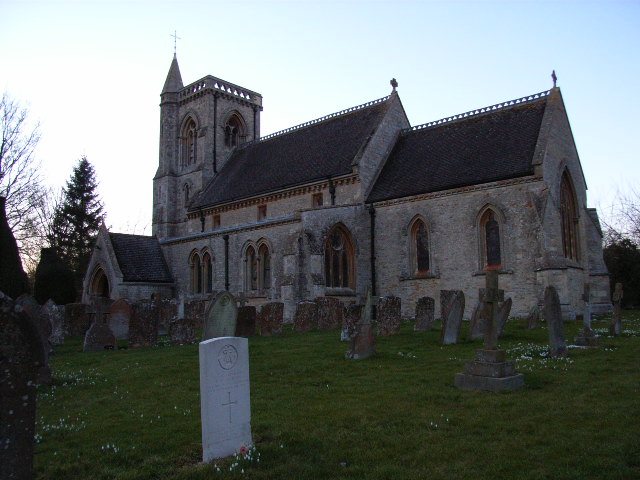
- St Edward the Confessor's, Shalstone

- Location within Buckinghamshire
- Population: 117 (2011)
- OS grid reference: SP640365
- Civil parish: Shalstone
- Unitary authority: Buckinghamshire
- Ceremonial county: Buckinghamshire
- Region: South East
- Country: England
- Sovereign state: United Kingdom
- Post town: BUCKINGHAM
- Postcode district: MK18
- Dialling code: 01280
- Police: Thames Valley
- Fire: Buckinghamshire
- Ambulance: South Central
- UK Parliament: Buckingham and Bletchley

Shalstone is a village and civil parish in Buckinghamshire, England. It is located in the north of the county, about four miles north west of Buckingham. The village name is Anglo-Saxon in origin, and means 'farm by a shallow stream'. In the Domesday Book of 1086 the village was recorded as Celdestone.

Shalstone Church, dedicated to St Edward the Confessor, was almost entirely reconstructed in 1862 by the architect Sir George Gilbert Scott. Some memorial tablets in the church survived the rebuilding; these are dedicated to members of the Purefoy family and their relatives the Jervoise family. Some of the memorial statuary is by Sir Richard Westmacott (remembered chiefly for his work on the new Houses of Parliament in London).

One memorial tablet commemorates the life of Elizabeth Purefoy. She was widowed in 1704 aged 32, and survived her husband by a further 61 years, as well as her unmarried son, Henry. The memorial, which she wrote herself and had installed in the church when she was still alive, reads:

She was a Woman of Excellent Sense and Spiritt
Prudent and Frugal
As well as a true friend To the family She married into
And was moreover endued
With all Those Graces and Virtues
Which distinguish and Adorn
The good Wife The good Mother and good Christian (sic)

She died in 1765.

The 'Purefoy Letters', a detailed catalogue of the everyday lives of the inhabitants of the village and surrounding area as seen through the eyes of the 90-year-old Elizabeth Purefoy to her son Henry during the period 1735-1753, were published in 1973. Henry- the squire- and his mother both lived at Shalstone House. The book records Shalstone at this period in minute detail.

Shalstone House is built in the Georgian style, of stone. The rectangular house is of a plain design five bays by six bays, on two floors. The hipped roof is hidden by a solid parapet. The house contains a notable chimneypiece by William Palmer installed in 1739. Shalstone House is still the home of the Purefoy family today.
