= Westbury, Buckinghamshire =

Village in Buckinghamshire, England

Coordinates: 52.0169°N 1.0933°W

Westbury
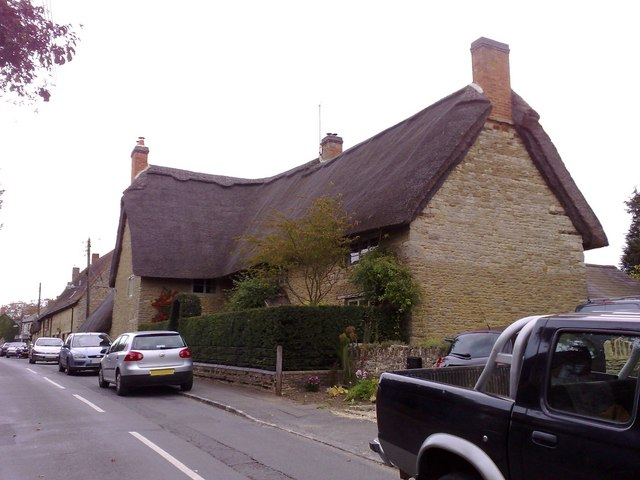

- Location within Buckinghamshire
- Population: 447 (2011 Census)
- OS grid reference: SP6235
- Civil parish: Westbury
- Unitary authority: Buckinghamshire
- Ceremonial county: Buckinghamshire
- Region: South East
- Country: England
- Sovereign state: United Kingdom
- Post town: BRACKLEY
- Postcode district: NN13
- Dialling code: 01280
- Police: Thames Valley
- Fire: Buckinghamshire
- Ambulance: South Central
- UK Parliament: Buckingham and Bletchley

Westbury is a village and civil parish in northern Buckinghamshire, England, about 2.5 miles (4.0 km) east of Brackley and 5 miles (8.0 km) west of Buckingham. In 2011 the parish had a population of 447. It is close to the A422 and the border with Oxfordshire.

The village was given by King Edward IV to the Company of Cooks in London, and has since been sold into private hands.

The parish church is St Augustine, a Grade II* listed building. The church dates back to the 13th century, though much restored in 1863. The church tower houses four bells, one of which dates back to the 14th century.

The village is home to Beachborough School, a private prep school established originally in Hampshire in 1910, but relocated to Westbury in 1942 in the manor house.
