= Woodham, Buckinghamshire =

Hamlet in Buckinghamshire, England

Coordinates: 51.8587°N 0.9848°W

Woodham
- Location within Buckinghamshire
- Population: 64 (Mid-2010 pop est)
- OS grid reference: SP699183
- Civil parish: Woodham
- Unitary authority: Buckinghamshire
- Ceremonial county: Buckinghamshire
- Region: South East
- Country: England
- Sovereign state: United Kingdom
- Post town: AYLESBURY
- Postcode district: HP18
- Dialling code: 01296
- Police: Thames Valley
- Fire: Buckinghamshire
- Ambulance: South Central
- UK Parliament: Mid Buckinghamshire

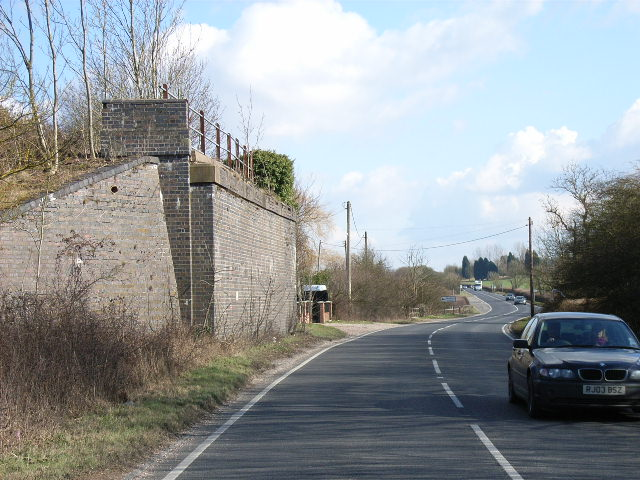

Woodham is a hamlet and civil parish about 7.5 miles (12.1 km) west of Aylesbury in Buckinghamshire. At the 2011 Census the population of the hamlet was included in the civil parish of Kingswood.

The toponym is derived from the Old English for "home near a wood", referring to its proximity to the ancient Bernwood Forest.

Woodham is on the ancient Akeman Street Roman road, which since the 1920s has been classified as the A41.

In 1906 the Great Central Railway built a line through the parish and opened Akeman Street railway station where it crossed the main road at Woodham. The station had a short working life, being closed by the GCR's successor the London and North Eastern Railway in 1930.
