= Dunton, Buckinghamshire =

Village in Buckinghamshire, England

Coordinates: 51.9116°N 0.8018°W

Dunton
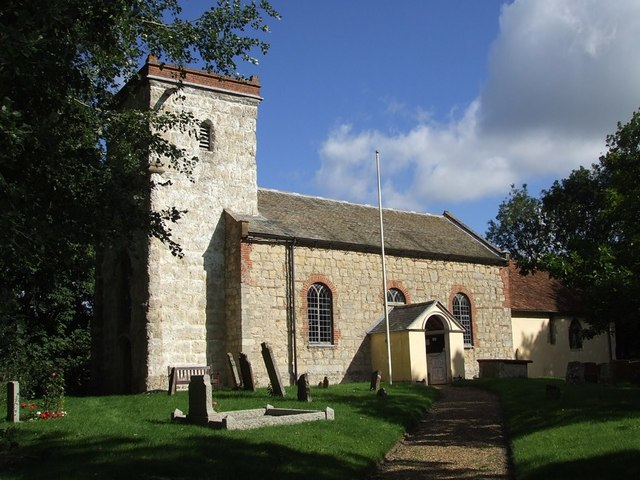
- St Martin's Church

- Location within Buckinghamshire
- Population: 189 (2011 Census including Hoggeston)
- OS grid reference: SP822241
  - London: 40 mi (64 km) SE
- Unitary authority: Buckinghamshire
- Ceremonial county: Buckinghamshire
- Region: South East
- Country: England
- Sovereign state: United Kingdom
- Post town: BUCKINGHAM
- Postcode district: MK18
- Dialling code: 01525
- Police: Thames Valley
- Fire: Buckinghamshire
- Ambulance: South Central
- UK Parliament: Buckingham

Dunton is a village and civil parish in the Aylesbury Vale district of Buckinghamshire, England. The village is situated approximately 8 miles (13 km) north from Aylesbury and 4 miles (6.4 km) south-east from Winslow.

In 2011, Dunton had a population (including Hoggeston) of 189. The parish contains the Grade II* listed Church of St Martin and six other buildings that are Grade II listed.

== History ==
According to A Dictionary of British Place Names, the Dunton name is Old English in origin, and means an estate linked to a man called 'Dodda' or 'Dudda'. In the 1086 Domesday Book Dunton it is recorded as "Dodintone." At that time, the manor was held by Odo of Bayeux, a bishop. Records from 1298 and 1322 discuss a windmill in Dunton.

In the 1870s, John Marius Wilson described Dunton as: "a parish in Winslow district, Bucks; near the source of the river Thame, 4 miles SE by S of Winslow town and r. station."

For many years before 1862, the manor was held by the Earl Spencer, but then passed to Lord Carrington. As of 1925, his son, the Marquess of Lincolnshire, held the manor.

Dunton's parish church is dedicated to St Martin. The historic listing summary provides these specifics: "C12 nave with S. wall rebuilt late C18, C13 chancel. Cl5 W. tower, all much restored late C18". Documents from the reign of Edward I of England indicate that the church was an "appurtenant to Dunton Manor", and had a rectory.

Another source states that the church nave dates to the 12th century, the chancel to the 13th, and the tower to the 15th. Rebuilding and restoration took place in the 18th century. St Martin's was Grade II* listed by English Heritage in 1959. The church is the only public building in Dunton, and is a centre for parish social life. Further parish Grade II listed buildings include The Old Rectory, an early 18th-century house; and Dunton Manor, a 16th-century house with later alterations.

== Demographics ==
Dunton's population in 2011 was 189 according to census data. Historically the parish population has not been this large. Past parish data shows population has only surpassed 100 people twice before 2001: once in 1831, when there were 116 people; and ten years later in 1841, when there were 107.

The numbers of males and females follow a general trend between 1801 and 2011. The only year in which males and females were of equal number was 1961, when each numbered 38.

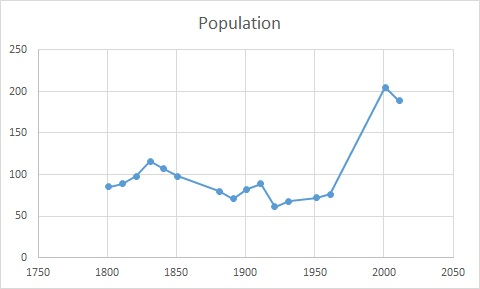
Total Dunton civil parish population levels taken from 1801 to 2011 census data

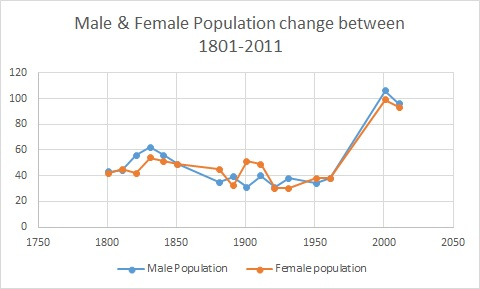
Numbers of males and females between 1801 and 2011 taken from census data

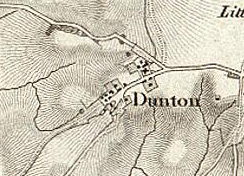
19th-century map of Dunton
