= Beachampton =

Village in Buckinghamshire, England

Coordinates: 52.025°N 0.875°W

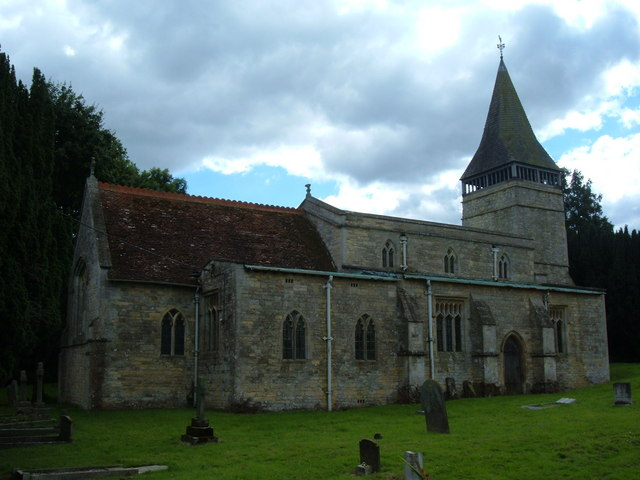
- Parish church of the Assumption

- Location within Buckinghamshire
- Interactive map of Beachampton
- Population: 184 (2011 Census)
- OS grid reference: SP7737
- Civil parish: Beachampton
- Unitary authority: Buckinghamshire
- Ceremonial county: Buckinghamshire
- Region: South East
- Country: England
- Sovereign state: United Kingdom
- Post town: Milton Keynes
- Postcode district: MK19
- Dialling code: 01908
- Police: Thames Valley
- Fire: Buckinghamshire
- Ambulance: South Central
- UK Parliament: Buckingham and Bletchley

Beachampton is a village and civil parish beside the River Great Ouse in the unitary authority area of Buckinghamshire, England. The village is about 5 miles (8.0 km) east of Buckingham and a similar distance west of the centre of Milton Keynes.

== History ==
The village toponym is derived from the Old English for "home farm by a stream". In the Domesday Book of 1086 it was recorded as Bechentone.

Parts of the village stand on high ground, but most of the village is prone to regular flooding by the stream that runs through the village, a tributary of the River Ouse.

The family name Beachampton originates in this village, and was first recorded in manorial records in 1175 when Osmer de Beachampton was a tenant here. There is no documentary evidence for the tradition that Hall Farm in Beachampton was the home of Catherine Parr when she was married to King Henry VIII.

Beachampton Hall, a Grade II* listed manor house, has elements dating from the 15th century. The present house was probably built by the Piggot family: Sir Thomas Piggot hosted a 1603 visit of Queen Anne of Denmark, wife of King James VI and I; the gardens were laid out at this time.

The Church of England parish church of the Assumption of St Mary the Virgin dates from the 14th century, and is grade II* listed. G.E. Street, a Gothic Revival architect, rebuilt upper part of the bell-tower in 1873–74. It has a large monument to Simon Benett Bt. (1682). The Bennetts (or Bennets) have been Lords of Beachampton (styled Lord de Beachampton) and of the neighbouring manor of Calverton since 1616. Both these manorial lordship titles, though not the lands, remain in the possession of the Bennett family to the present day.

The parish has a further nine listed buildings and structures.

== Sources ==
- Page, William, ed. (1927). "Parishes : Beachampton". A History of the County of Buckingham. Victoria History of the Counties of England. Vol. 4. London: Constable & Co. Ltd. pp. 149–153.
- Pevsner, Nikolaus (1973) [1960]. The Buildings of England: Buckinghamshire. Harmondsworth: Penguin Books. pp. 61–62. ISBN 0-14-071019-1.
