= Aylesbury Vale =

Geographic region in Buckinghamshire, England

Coordinates: 51°53′28″N 0°54′43″W

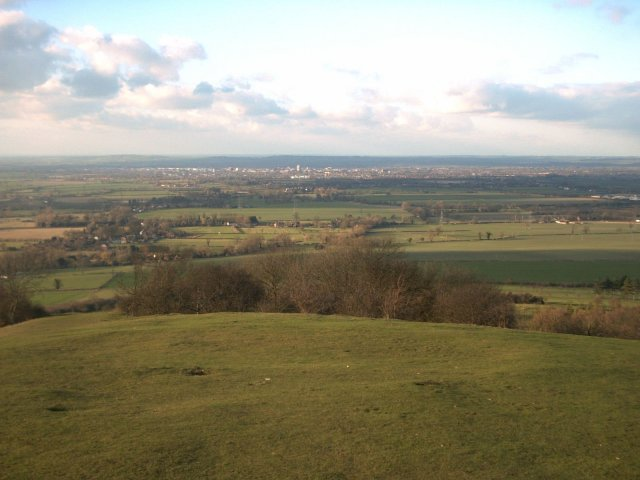
- Part of Aylesbury Vale taken from the top of Coombe Hill, looking towards Aylesbury

- Aylesbury Vale shown within Buckinghamshire
- Sovereign state: United Kingdom
- Constituent country: England
- Region: South East England
- Ceremonial county: Buckinghamshire

Area
  - Total: 348.55 sq mi (902.75 km^{2})

Population (mid-2018)
  - Total: 199,448
  - Density: 572.22/sq mi (220.93/km^{2})
  - Ethnicity: 92.3% White; 3.7% S.Asian; 1.5% Black; 1.5% Mixed; 1.0% Chinese or Other
- Time zone: UTC0 (GMT)
  - Summer (DST): UTC+1 (BST)
- ONS code: 11UB (ONS); E07000004 (GSS)
- OS grid reference: SP818138
- Website: www.aylesburyvaledc.gov.uk

The Aylesbury Vale (or Vale of Aylesbury) is a geographical region in Buckinghamshire, England, covering the predominantly rural area between Milton Keynes and the Chilterns. It is named after its main town, Aylesbury, the county town of Buckinghamshire. Other key settlements in the region include Winslow and Buckingham.

The bed of the vale is largely made up of clay that was formed at the end of the last ice age.

Before 2020, there was a local government district known as Aylesbury Vale. It was succeeded by the unitary district of Buckinghamshire during local government restructuring in 2020.

In the 2001 census, the population of Aylesbury Vale was 165,748, representing an increase since 1991 of 18,600 people. About half of those live in Aylesbury.

== Government ==
Aylesbury Vale was administered as a local government district of northern Buckinghamshire, with its own district council between 1974 and 2020. The council's offices were in Aylesbury. The district council's logo included the historical figure of John Hampden. The district was formed on 1 April 1974 by the merger of the boroughs of Aylesbury and Buckingham, Aylesbury Rural District, Buckingham Rural District, Wing Rural District and part of Winslow Rural District. Aylesbury Vale was absorbed into the new unitary Buckinghamshire Council on 1 April 2020.

There are 111 civil parishes in the area of the former non-metropolitan district: 84 with a parish council, including three town councils (Aylesbury, Buckingham and Winslow), and a further 27 operating with a Parish meeting, see list of civil parishes in Aylesbury Vale.

== Literature ==
The Aylesbury Vale countryside is described in the English novel The War Hero.

== Tourism ==
The Vale has a number of historic buildings and landscapes which are tourist attractions. The National Trust owns several properties including Waddesdon Manor, Claydon House and the landscaped gardens at Stowe House. The Silverstone Circuit sits on the northern boundary of the Vale with South Northamptonshire, and the Buckinghamshire Railway Centre is located near Quainton. Aylesbury is home to the County Museum (which includes the Roald Dahl Children's Gallery), and Buckingham features the Old Gaol Museum.

== Transport ==
There are no motorway junctions in the Vale although the M40 does cross it for five miles between junctions 8A and 9. The A41 road, the A413 road and the A418 road meet at Aylesbury. The A421 road passes through the north of the Vale providing connections to Milton Keynes, Bedford and the M1 to the east, and the M40, Oxford and Birmingham to the west.

The Vale is served by rail connections to the capital, containing several railway stations on the London to Aylesbury Line – the major station being Aylesbury. At Aylesbury there are connecting services to Princes Risborough. In addition, the Chiltern Main Line passes through the district, stopping at Haddenham & Thame Parkway. The West Coast Main Line passes through the Vale twice along its eastern borders, with national intercity services stopping at nearby Milton Keynes Central which, with Bletchley, is also served by regional services.

As of 2023, construction work is underway on two further rail lines across the Vale, High Speed 2 (HS2) and East West Rail (EWR). The HS2 route runs north-west, largely following the former Great Central Main Line route, but without providing any services to any towns in the county. EWR runs across the Vale, with trains between Oxford and Milton Keynes Central, calling at Winslow and Bletchley, due to commence in early 2025. Buckinghamshire Council has established a cycleway between Buckingham and Winslow to maximise use of the new station.

There are also proposals for a branch line from East West Rail, to run from Claydon LNE Junction via Aylesbury Vale Parkway to Aylesbury, which were discussed in Parliament in 2021. This proposal remains "under review" and is not in any current plans. (The route of HS2 uses the same corridor and, as of August 2023, the Claydon line is needed to move materials for its engineering works.)
