= Beaconsfield =

Market town in Buckinghamshire, England

Coordinates: 51.600873°N 0.634682°W

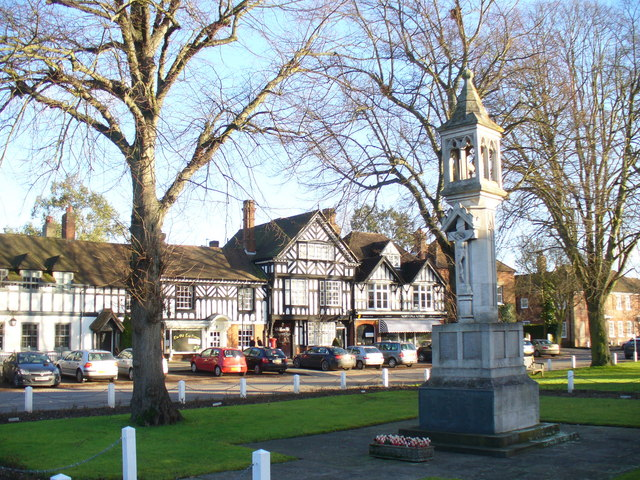
- Memorial Green, the Old Town, Beaconsfield

- Location within Buckinghamshire
- Area: 19.66 km^{2} (7.59 sq mi)
- Population: 12,235
  - Density: 622/km^{2} (1,610/sq mi)
- OS grid reference: SU9490
- Civil parish: Beaconsfield
- Unitary authority: Buckinghamshire
- Ceremonial county: Buckinghamshire
- Region: South East
- Country: England
- Sovereign state: United Kingdom
- Post town: Beaconsfield
- Postcode district: HP9
- Dialling code: 01494
- Police: Thames Valley
- Fire: Buckinghamshire
- Ambulance: South Central
- UK Parliament: Beaconsfield

Beaconsfield (/ˈbɛkənzfiːld/ BECK-ənz-feeld) is a market town and civil parish in Buckinghamshire, England, 24 miles (39 kilometres) northwest of Central London and 16 miles (26 kilometres) southeast of Aylesbury. Three other towns are within 5 miles (8 kilometres): Gerrards Cross, Amersham and High Wycombe.

The town is adjacent to the Chiltern Hills Area of Outstanding Natural Beauty and has Georgian, neo-Georgian and Tudor revival high street architecture, known as the Old Town. It is known for the first model village in the world and the National Film and Television School.

Beaconsfield was Britain's richest town (based on an average house price of £684,474) in 2008. In 2011 it had the highest proportion in the UK of £1 million-plus homes for sale (at 47%, compared to 3.5% nationally).

== History and description ==
The parish comprises Beaconsfield town and land mainly given over arable land. Some beech forest remains to supply an established beech furniture industry in High Wycombe, the making of modal and various artisan uses.

Beaconsfield is recorded in property returns of 1185 where it is spelt Bekenesfeld, literally beechen field which would less archaically be read as clearing in the beeches. Nearby Burnham Beeches is a forest named after the beech genus. Although, it is often incorrectly contested that Beaconsfield derived its name from a street called Beacon Hill in neighbouring village, Penn, which was a lookout point and beacon originating in Saxon times. Local men were called to defend an island fort as the beacon was part of a chain from the naval base at Portsmouth via Butser Hill Hindhead, Hogsback and Windsor.

The parish church at the crossroads of Old Beaconsfield is dedicated to St Mary, it was rebuilt of flint and bath stone by the Victorians in 1869. The United Reformed Church in Beaconsfield can trace its roots of non-conformist worship in the town back to 1704. Old Beaconsfield has a number of old coaching inns along a wide street of red brick houses and small shops. It was the first (coach) stopping point on the road between London and Oxford, as it is equidistant between the two places.

An annual charter fair is traditionally held on 10 May and has been held every year since 1269 celebrating its 750th year in 2019.

In the Victorian era the town was the home constituency of Benjamin Disraeli, Prime Minister of the United Kingdom in 1868 and then again from 1874 until 1880 (in fact his home, Hughenden Manor is in the nearby town of High Wycombe). In 1876 he was made the 1st Earl of Beaconsfield by Queen Victoria with whom he was very popular. It was due to this that Beaconsfield became a popular road name in industrial cities across the country in the late Victorian era.

It is the burial place of the author G. K. Chesterton, the writer Edmund Burke and the poet Edmund Waller, for whom a tall stone obelisk was erected over the tomb chest in St Mary and All Saints’ churchyard.

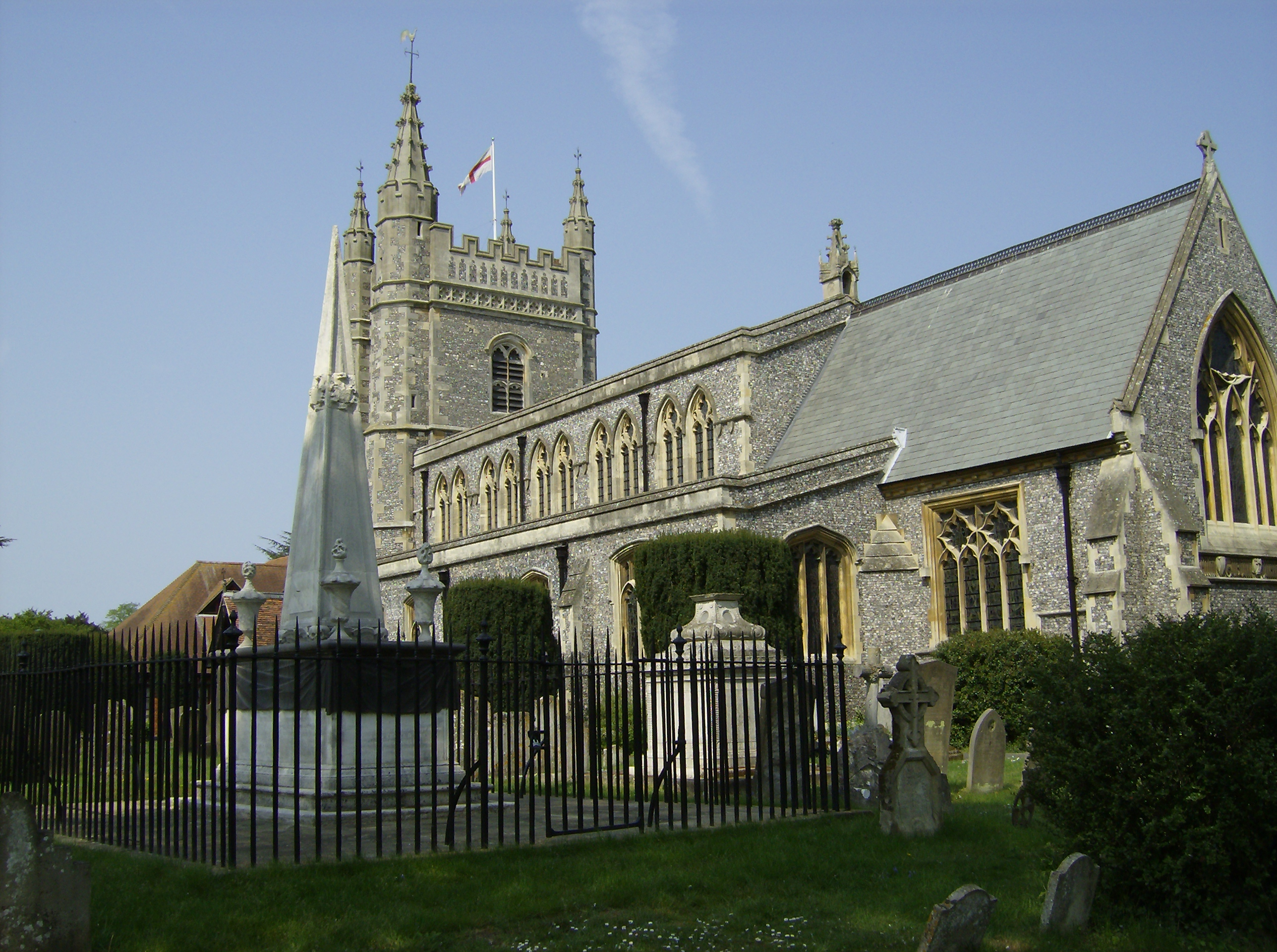
St Mary and All Saints’ Church, and the tomb of the poet and politician Edmund Waller at left

In 1624 Waller's family acquired Wilton Manor and Hall Barn in the town. "The Wallers, who came from Speldhurst, Kent," says the Victoria County history of Buckinghamshire, "were settled at Beaconsfield as early as the 14th century."

Ledborough was a former hamlet in the parish of Beaconsfield, in Buckinghamshire, England which has become incorporated into the urban area of the town of Beaconsfield as it rapidly expanded in the early part of the 20th century.

Beaconsfield is the home of Bekonscot model village, which was the first model village in the world; and Beaconsfield Film Studios becoming the National Film and Television School, where many filmmakers have trained, including the directors Nick Park, Lynne Ramsay and David Yates and the cinematographer Roger Deakins. It is the birthplace of Terry Pratchett, author of the Discworld series of fantasy novels. Several scenes in Brief Encounter, a classic film about a woman in a dull middle class marriage who almost undertakes an affair, were filmed in the town: Station Parade served as Milford High Street and Boots on Burke's Parade was where Alec runs into Laura. The exterior of the Royal Saracens Head Inn can be seen in the James Bond film Thunderball, and the interior shots for the pub in Hot Fuzz were filmed in the Royal Standard of England pub. Many other parts of the town have been used in films due to the old film studio and nearby Pinewood Studios.

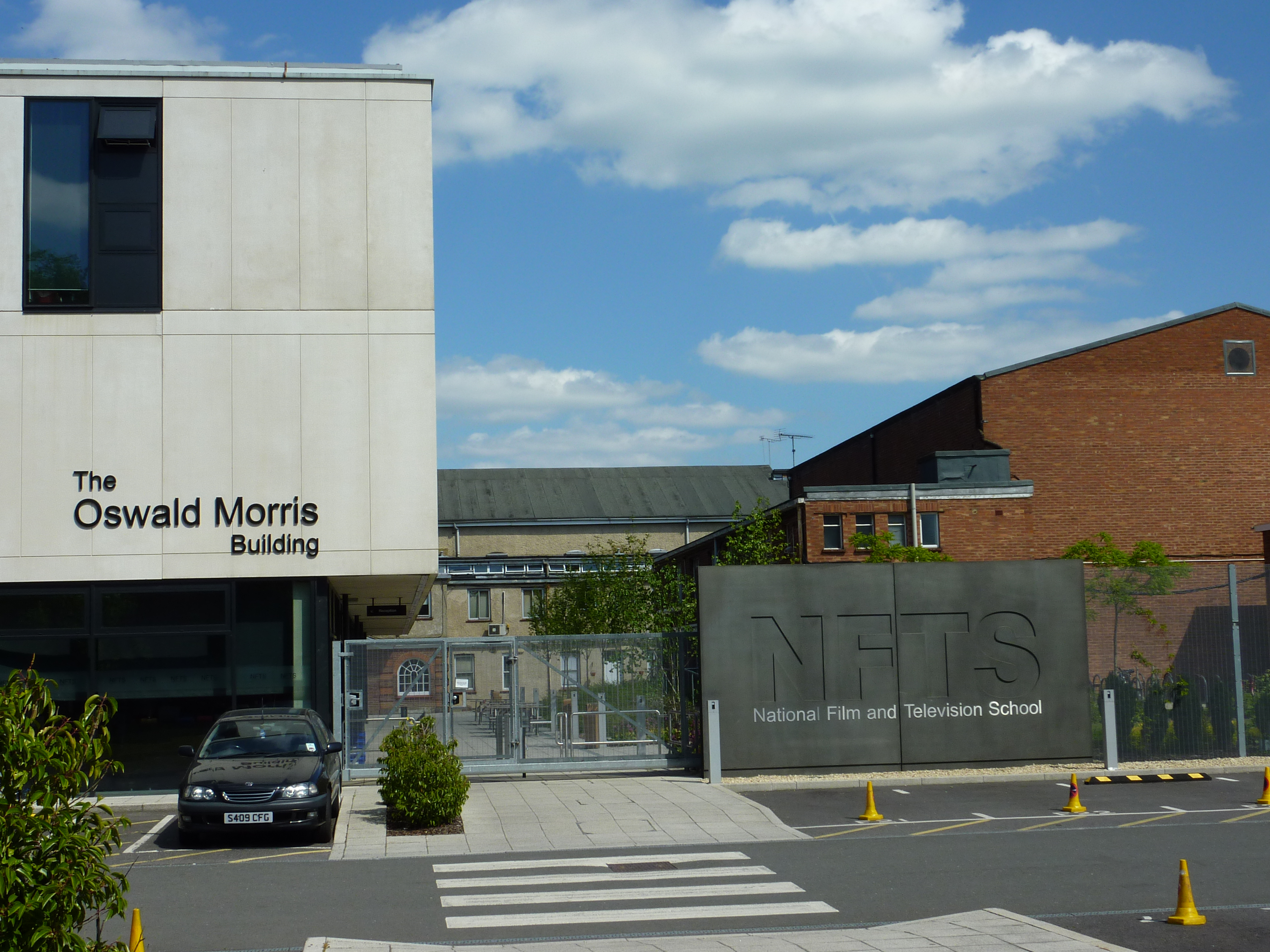
Beaconsfield Film Studios in 2011: as NFTS

The New Town was built one mile further to the north, when the railway arrived, at the turn of the 20th century. The railway station is on the Chiltern Main Line out of Marylebone towards High Wycombe, after which it then branches to Aylesbury, and Birmingham Snow Hill. Old Beaconsfield which grew up on the Oxford Road in part to serve the coach traffic, is mirrored by New Beaconsfield which has grown up round the station.

== Sport and leisure ==
- Beaconsfield Cricket Club play at Wilton Park.
- Beaconsfield Rugby Club play at Oak Lodge Meadow.
- Beaconsfield Town Football Club, a Non-League football club play at Holloways Park, Windsor Road, Beaconsfield.

== Governance ==
=== Parliamentary constituencies ===
The parish of Beaconsfield is within the parliamentary constituency of Beaconsfield (which also covers Marlow and other neighbourhoods) towards the south. There are also areas to the north of the town (particularly in the parish of Penn) which have Beaconsfield postal address, but fall within the Chesham and Amersham constituency. Joy Morrissey, a member of the Conservative Party, is the current member of Parliament (MP) for Beaconsfield. She defeated Dominic Grieve in the 2019 general election. Grieve, a former Attorney General for England and Wales, was first elected as a Conservative in 1997, and stood as an independent at the 2019 election having had the party whip removed.

As a young man, Tony Blair, later Prime Minister of the United Kingdom, stood as the Labour Party's candidate at the 1982 Beaconsfield by-election, but lost to the Conservative candidate, Tim Smith. Smith was later found to be involved with Neil Hamilton in the cash-for-questions affair which was the financial part of the Major ministry sleaze uncovered before the 1997 general election. This was the only election Blair ever lost.

Liam Fox was a general practitioner in Beaconsfield before being elected to Parliament, though he represented a seat in Somerset.

=== Local government ===
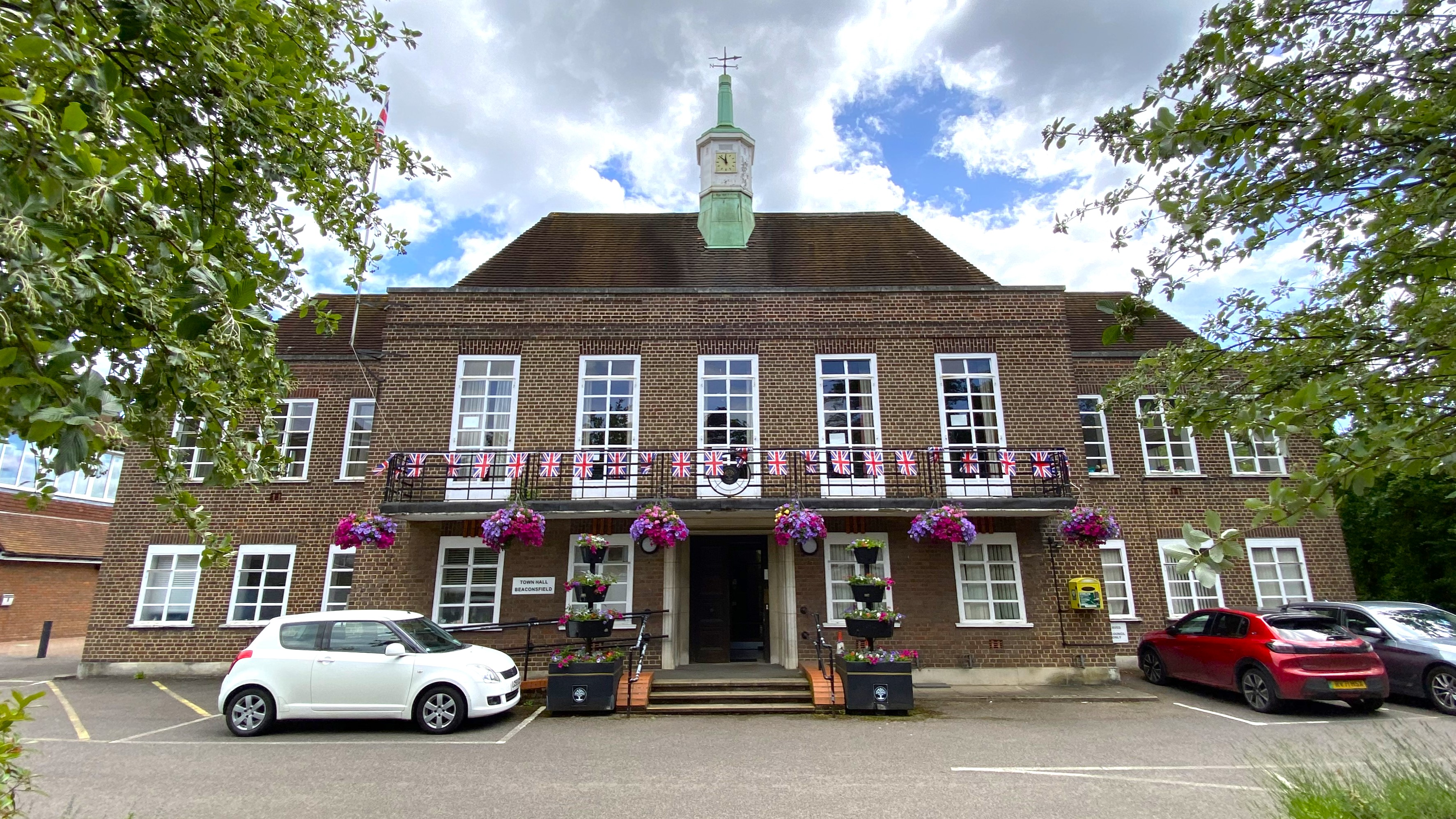
Beaconsfield Town Hall

There are two tiers of local government covering Beaconsfield, at parish (town) and unitary authority level: Beaconsfield Town Council and Buckinghamshire Council.

On Buckinghamshire Council, the town is now represented, following local elections on 1 May 2025 by Jackson Ng (Conservative Party) who was re-elected for a second term, and Christine Adali (Liberal Democrats) newly elected, replacing Alison Wheelhouse (independent). Both are also sitting councillors of Beaconsfield Town Council.

The parish of Beaconsfield was made a local board district in 1850, which became Beaconsfield Urban District in 1894. Beaconsfield Urban District Council built itself Beaconsfield Town Hall on Penn Road in 1936 to serve as its headquarters. Beaconsfield Urban District was abolished in 1974, with the area merging with part of Eton Rural District to become Beaconsfield District, which (despite the name) chose to base itself at the old Eton Rural District Council's offices in Slough rather than in Beaconsfield. Beaconsfield District Council renamed itself South Bucks District Council in 1980. The district council was abolished in 2020.

Beaconsfield Town Council was created in 1974 as a successor parish, covering the area of the abolished urban district. Beaconsfield Town Council is based at the urban district council's old headquarters at Town Hall.

== Transport ==
The M40 runs very close to the town with Junction 2 on the parish boundary and is 4 lanes wide in either direction (junctions 1a to 3). Junction 2 is home to Beaconsfield motorway services. Local roads include the A355 which connects Amersham and Slough via Beaconsfield. The A40 parallels the M40 from London to Oxford and for years was the main road between the two cities as its precursor. The B474 connects the town to Hazlemere.

Beaconsfield railway station provides services to Birmingham Snow Hill, Birmingham Moor Street, Aylesbury, Oxford and London Marylebone. There are fast and slow services, the former currently reaching London in around twenty-five minutes. It has a car park for commuters who drive towards the capital along the M40.

== Twin town ==
Beaconsfield has been twinned with Langres in Grand Est, France, since 1995.

== Education ==
Buckinghamshire Council operates a selective secondary education system, rather than a comprehensive system. Pupils can take the 11+ test at the beginning of year 6, when they are age 10 or 11. Approximately 30% attain a score that makes them eligible to go to grammar schools, as well as to the county's upper schools.

- Alfriston School is a special school for girls, with moderate learning difficulties, between the ages of 11 and 18
- Beaconsfield High School is a grammar school for girls between the ages of 11 and 18
- The Beaconsfield School is a co-educational secondary school and sixth form. Its sixth-form students join with Beaconsfield High to increase the courses available
- Davenies School is a private preparatory day school for boys between ages 4 and 13, with facilities including: a sports field, swimming pool, astroturf and sports hall
- High March School is a private preparatory day school for girls between the ages of 3 and 11 with a few boys in the Nursery
- Butlers Court School is a primary school for girls and boys
- St Mary's and All Saints is a Church of England primary school for girls and boys
- Holtspur School & Pre-School is a pre-school and primary school for boys and girls

== Demography ==
2011 Published Statistics: Population, home ownership and extracts from Physical Environment, surveyed in 2005
Output area	Homes owned outright	Owned with a loan	Socially rented	Privately rented	Other	km^{2} roads	km^{2} water	km^{2} domestic gardens	km^{2} domestic buildings	km^{2} non-domestic buildings	Usual residents	km^{2}
Civil parish	1,842	1,419	655	700	76	0.914	0.075	2.935	0.466	0.131	12,081	19.66

The population in 1841 was 1,732.

== Notable residents ==
- Zoe Ball (born 1970) – television and radio presenter, grew up in Beaconsfield
- Enid Blyton (1897–1968) – writer who lived for most of her life in Green Hedges, a large house that has since been demolished. There is an Enid Blyton Room nearby at The Red Lion pub in Knotty Green, where there is a gallery of pictures and a library of books, donated by The Enid Blyton Society. There is a model of her house at Bekonscot Model Village. In 2014 a plaque recording her time as a resident in the town from 1938 until her death in 1968 was unveiled in the Beaconsfield Town Hall gardens, next to small iron figures of Noddy and Big-Ears
- Edmund Burke (1729–1797) – statesman and the founder of political conservatism, lived in the Gregories estate just outside Beaconsfield
- G. K. Chesterton (1874–1936) – writer, is buried in Beaconsfield; there is a blue plaque on his former home in Grove Road
- James Corden (born 1978) – actor and TV presenter, lived in Beaconsfield until 2009
- Beverley Craven (born 1963) – singer, has lived in Beaconsfield since 2003
- Benjamin Disraeli (1804–1881) – Prime Minister of the United Kingdom twice between 1868 and 1880 was created Earl of Beaconsfield by Queen Victoria in 1876
- Robert Frost (1874–1963) – American poet, moved to Beaconsfield with his family in 1912
- Barry Gibb (born 1946) – singer with the Bee Gees
- Romain Grosjean (born 1986) – Formula One driver lived here whilst driving for Haas F1 Team until his departure in 2020
- Chris Harris (born 1975) – automotive journalist and automotive racing driver, was born in Beaconsfield
- Dame Wendy Hiller (1912–2003) – actress, died at her Beaconsfield home
- Peter Jones (born 1966) – entrepreneur and star of Dragons' Den; lived in Beaconsfield with his wife and children
- Albert Kitson (1868–1937) – geologist and naturalist, moved to Beaconsfield in 1930 and died there in 1937
- Samuel Leeds (born 1991) – Youtuber, property trainer and investor
- Anne Main (born 1957) – former MP for St Albans, Hertfordshire, lived in Beaconsfield
- Michael Middleton (born 1949) – father of Catherine, Princess of Wales, grew up in Beaconsfield.
- Michael Mosley (1957–2024) – British television and radio journalist, producer, presenter and writer, lived in Beaconsfield
- Airey Neave (1916–1979) – politician, grew up in Beaconsfield
- Sir Gore Ouseley (1770–1844) – ambassador, orientalist and High Sheriff of Buckinghamshire, died in Beaconsfield
- Sir Terry Pratchett (1948–2015) – comic fantasy writer, was born and brought up in Beaconsfield
- Piers Paul Read (born 1941) – novelist and non-fiction author, was born in Beaconsfield
- Peter Rogers (1916–2009) – Carry On Films producer, lived for many years in Beaconsfield because of its proximity to Pinewood Studios
- Alex Sobel (born 1975) – MP
- Molly Templeton (born 1989) – YouTuber, grew up in the town
- Sam Togwell (born 1984) – professional football player, born in Beaconsfield
- Claire Trévien (born 1985) – poet and academic, lives in Beaconsfield
- Alison Uttley (1884–1976) – writer, moved to Beaconsfield during the Second World War
- Edmund Waller (1606–1687) – poet, lived at Hall Barn in Beaconsfield
- Bert Weedon (1920–2012) – guitarist

== See also ==
- The Chiltern Cinema, Beaconsfield
