= South Bucks District Council elections =

Local government elections in Buckinghamshire, England

South Bucks District Council was elected every four years from 1973 until 2020.

== Political control ==
From the first election to the council in 1973 until its merger into Buckinghamshire Council in 2020, political control of the council was held by the following parties:

Party in control	Years
Conservative	1973–1995
No overall control	1995–1999
Conservative	1999–2020

=== Leadership ===
The role of chair of the council was largely ceremonial. Until 2001, political leadership was provided by the chair of the policy committee, sometimes informally known as the leader of the council. In 2001 the policy committee was replaced with a leader and cabinet model of governance, with the last chair of the policy committee becoming the first formally appointed leader of the council. The leaders from 1999 until the council's abolition in 2020 were:

Councillor	Party	From	To
Trevor Egleton	Conservative	25 May 1999	May 2003
Peter Hardy	Conservative	20 May 2003	May 2007
Adrian Busby	Conservative	22 May 2007	May 2015
Ralph Bagge	Conservative	26 May 2015	26 Sep 2017
Nick Naylor	Conservative	19 Oct 2017	31 Mar 2020

== Council elections ==
- 1973 Beaconsfield District Council election
- 1976 Beaconsfield District Council election
- 1979 Beaconsfield District Council election (District boundary changes took place but the number of seats remained the same)
- 1983 South Bucks District Council election (New ward boundaries & district boundary changes also took place)
- 1987 South Bucks District Council election (District boundary changes took place but the number of seats remained the same)
- 1991 South Bucks District Council election (District boundary changes took place but the number of seats remained the same)
- 1995 South Bucks District Council election (District boundary changes took place but the number of seats remained the same)
- 1999 South Bucks District Council election
- 2003 South Bucks District Council election (New ward boundaries)
- 2007 South Bucks District Council election (Some new ward boundaries)
- 2011 South Bucks District Council election
- 2015 South Bucks District Council election (New ward boundaries)

== Council composition ==
Year	Conservative	Liberal Democrats	Beaconsfield IEA	Independent	Council control after election
2003	33	1	0	6	Conservative
2007	36	2	2	0	Conservative
2011	38	1	1	0	Conservative
2015	27	0	0	1	Conservative

== District result maps ==
2003 results map

2007 results map

2011 results map

2015 results map

== By-election results ==
=== 2003-2007 ===
Burnham Lent Rise By-Election 19 August 2004
Party	Candidate	Votes	%	±%
Conservative	Linda Hazell	335	70.1	+22.4
Liberal Democrats	Christopher Tucker	143	29.9	+6.0
Majority		192	40.2	
Turnout		478		
Conservative hold		Swing		

Beaconsfield North By-Election 5 May 2005
Party	Candidate	Votes	%	±%
Conservative	Simon Nicholls	1,306	54.6	−3.7
Independent	John Meredith	794	33.2	+33.2
Labour	Stephen Lathrope	294	12.3	−0.5
Majority		512	21.4	
Turnout		2,394		
Conservative hold		Swing		

Burnham Church By-Election 5 May 2005
Party	Candidate	Votes	%	±%
Conservative	John Capel	1,254	58.7	+9.1
Liberal Democrats	Stephen Lathrope	881	41.3	+13.3
Majority		373	17.5	
Turnout		2,135		
Conservative hold		Swing		

Beaconsfield South By-Election 14 July 2005
Party	Candidate	Votes	%	±%
Conservative	Jacquetta Lowen-Cooper	347	77.1	+22.2
Liberal Democrats	Paul Henry	103	22.9	−8.9
Majority		244	54.2	
Turnout		450		
Conservative hold		Swing		

=== 2007-2011 ===
Burnham Church By-Election 26 August 2010
Party	Candidate	Votes	%	±%
Conservative	Paul Kelly	459	56.3	−11.5
UKIP	Peter Price	276	33.9	+33.9
Liberal Democrats	David Linsdall	80	9.8	−22.4
Majority		183	22.5	
Turnout		815		
Conservative hold		Swing		

=== 2011-2015 ===
Iver Heath By-Election 14 June 2012
Party	Candidate	Votes	%	±%
Conservative	Luisa Sullivan	404	61.0	−5.6
UKIP	Adam Pamment	196	29.6	+29.6
Liberal Democrats	Peter Chapman	62	9.4	−24.0
Majority		208	31.4	
Turnout		662		
Conservative hold		Swing		

Iver Village and Richings Park By-Election 12 December 2013
Party	Candidate	Votes	%	±%
Conservative	Paul Griffin	422	46.9	−6.0
UKIP	Ken Wight	377	41.9	+41.9
Liberal Democrats	Peter Chapman	101	11.2	−35.9
Majority		45	5.0	
Turnout		900		
Conservative gain from Liberal Democrats		Swing		

=== 2015-2020 ===
Farnham and Hedgerley By-Election 5 May 2016
Party	Candidate	Votes	%	±%
Conservative	Claire Lewis	962	62.5	−15.6
UKIP	Delphine Gray-Fisk	339	22.0	+0.1
Green	Ryan Sains	239	15.5	+15.5
Majority		623	40.5	
Turnout		1,540		
Conservative hold		Swing		

Burnham Lent Rise and Taplow By-Election 5 October 2017
Party	Candidate	Votes	%	±%
Conservative	Matt Bezzant	699	65.9	+23.6
Labour	Alexa Collins	166	15.6	−0.4
Liberal Democrats	Carol Linton	136	12.8	+12.8
Green	Zoe Hatch	60	5.7	−7.7
Majority		533	50.2	
Turnout		1,061		
Conservative hold		Swing		

Beaconsfield North By-Election 2 November 2017
Party	Candidate	Votes	%	±%
Conservative	Damian Saunders	441	76.4	−9.7
Liberal Democrats	Paul Henry	136	23.6	+23.6
Majority		305	52.9	
Turnout		577		
Conservative hold		Swing		
