= Beaconsfield Town Hall =

Municipal building in Beaconsfield, Buckinghamshire, England

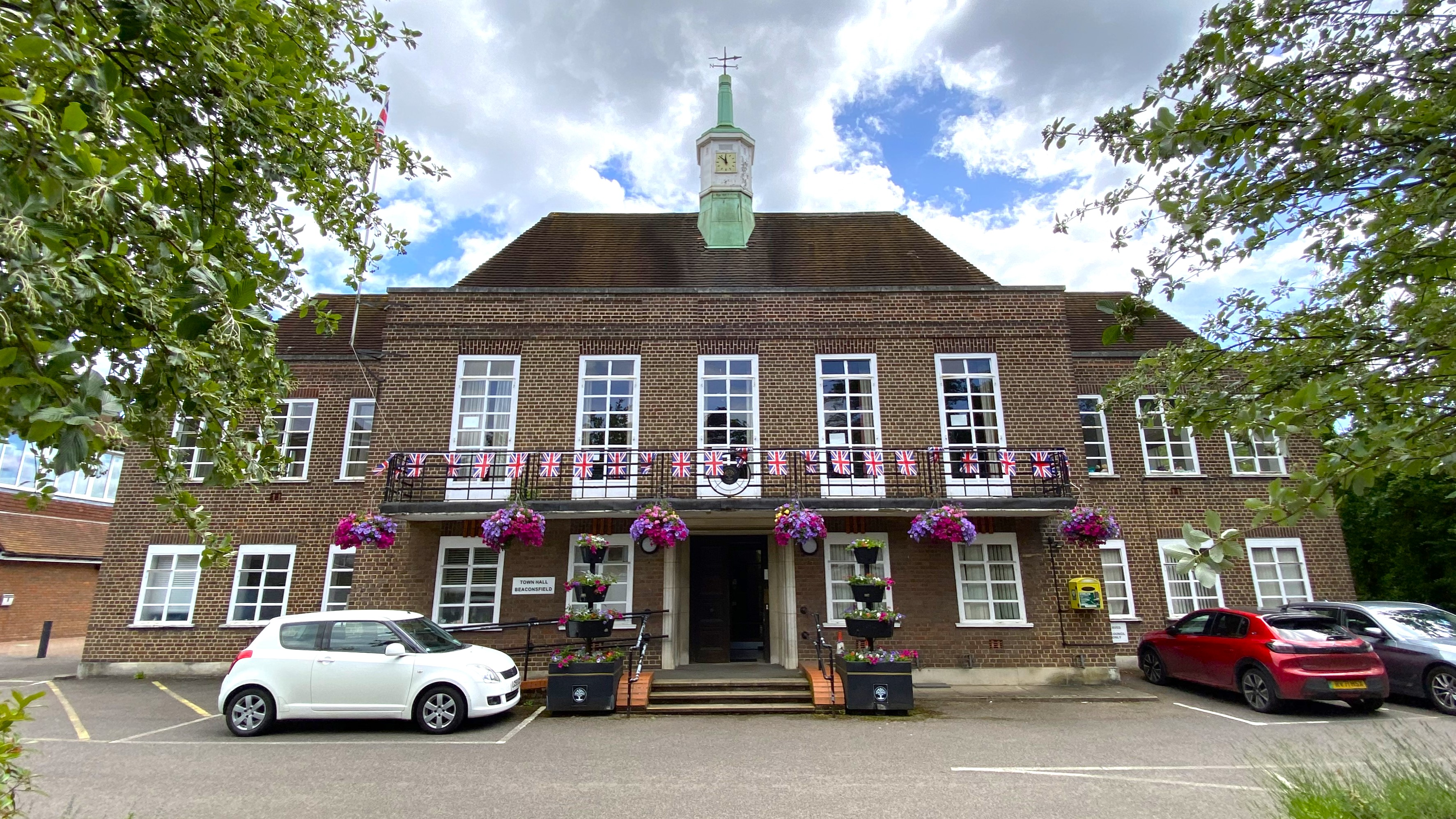
- Beaconsfield Town Hall

- Shown in Buckinghamshire
- 51.6119°N 0.6458°W
- Location: Penn Road, Beaconsfield

History
- Built: 1936

Site notes
- Architect(s): Burgess, Holden and Watson
- Architectural style: Neo-Georgian style

Beaconsfield Town Hall is a municipal building in Penn Road, Beaconsfield, Buckinghamshire, England. The structure accommodates the offices and meeting place of Beaconsfield Town Council.

== History ==
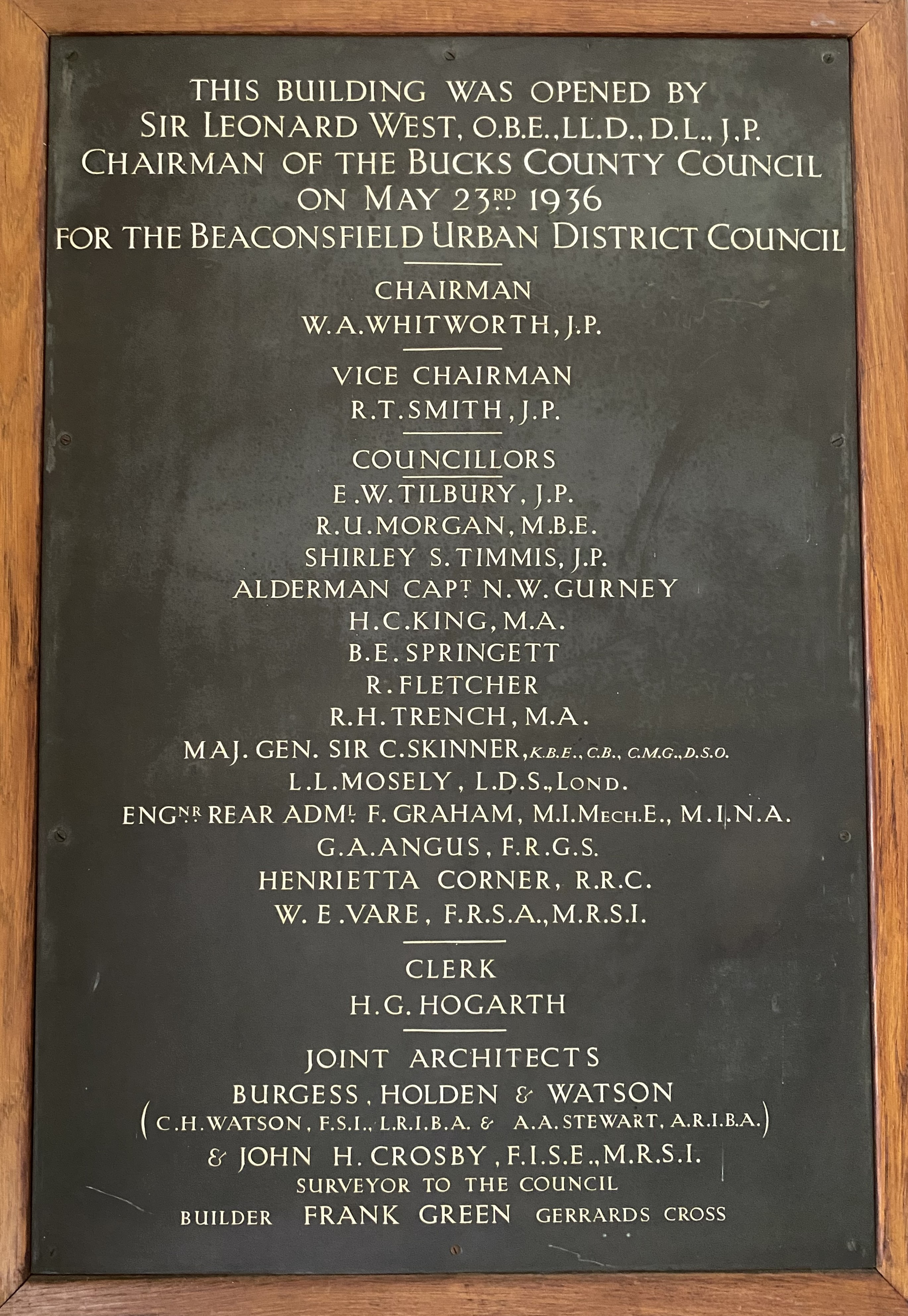
Plaque in the building's porch marking its opening in 1936.

The town of Beaconsfield had been governed by a local board of health from 1850, which became Beaconsfield Urban District Council in 1894. A group of local business leaders formed a private company to raise finance for the construction of a town hall on the west side of Station Road between the junctions with Gregories Road and Burkes Road. Built at a cost of £3,500, it became known as the Coronation Town Hall, as it was completed just in time for the Coronation of George V and Mary, and was officially opened by the High Sheriff of Buckinghamshire, William Baring du Pré, on 14 June 1911. The Coronation Town Hall was a public hall for functions and entertainment rather than offices or meeting place for the council; the urban district council continued to meet at the town's Reading Rooms at 8 The Broadway, Wycombe End, until the end of 1914. The urban district council then leased space in another new building, known as Council Hall, located directly south of the Coronation Town Hall at the corner of Burkes Road and Station Road, from January 1915; the council moved its offices to Council Hall and established their own council chamber on the first floor of the building.

In the early 1930s, civic leaders decided to co-locate all their functions in one building, with their offices having outgrown the available space at the 1915 Council Hall and the lease of the building coming to an end in 1936. The site they selected was open land on the east side of Station Road, some 300 yards (270 m) further north along the road from the previous buildings and just south of the old Railway Hotel. The new building was designed by Burgess, Holden & Watson together with the council surveyor, John Crosby, in the Neo-Georgian style, built in brown brick with stone dressings at a cost of £7,600 and was officially opened by the Chairman of Buckinghamshire County Council, Sir Leonard West, on 23 May 1936. The design involved a symmetrical main frontage with eleven bays facing onto Station Road; the central section of five bays, which slightly projected forward, featured a doorway on the ground floor and five French doors with a wrought-iron balcony on the first floor. The other bays were fenestrated with sash windows and, at roof level, there was a parapet and clock turret. Internally, the principal room was the council chamber on the first floor. The building was originally called "Council Hall", with the older 1915 Council Hall on Burkes Road being renamed Burkes Court. The 1911 Coronation Town Hall was demolished and a residential and retail building called Cardain House built on the site in the mid-1960s.

The 1936 Council Hall continued to serve as the headquarters of the urban district council for much of the 20th century but ceased to be the local seat of government after the enlarged Beaconsfield District Council (subsequently renamed South Bucks District Council) was formed in 1974. The new council chose to use the former Eton Rural District Council's offices on Windsor Road in Slough as its headquarters. Council Hall in Beaconsfield was subsequently used, in part, as the offices and meeting place of Beaconsfield Town Council and as an approved venue for weddings and civil partnership ceremonies. Beaconsfield Town Council now uses the name Town Hall for the building rather than Council Hall.

A park known as the Beaconsfield Town Hall gardens was established in front of the town hall in 2003. The gardens included a seating area with a gazebo and plaques to celebrate local themes, including a street fair, a lute player, a coach and horses, a railway and a model village. The plaques also celebrated famous former residents such as the writers, Enid Blyton and G. K. Chesterton. Ornaments included small iron figures, designed by the artist, Steffi Goddard, depicting Blyton's characters, Noddy and Big Ears, and an armillary sphere sundial in blackened brass. In 2012, a figure depicting the official mascot for the 2012 Summer Olympics, Wenlock, was also installed in the garden.
