= 2011 South Bucks District Council election =

Local election in South Bucks, UK

Results of the 2011 South Bucks District Council election

Elections to South Bucks District Council were held on 5 May 2011, alongside other local elections across the United Kingdom. Following the election the council remained under Conservative control.

== Results summary ==
2011 South Bucks District Council election
Party	Seats Before	Change	Seats After
Conservative Party	36	▲2	38
Liberal Democrats	2	▼1	1
Others	2	▼1	1

== See also ==
- South Bucks District Council elections
