= The Chiltern Cinema, Beaconsfield =

Coordinates: 51.6098°N 0.6455°W

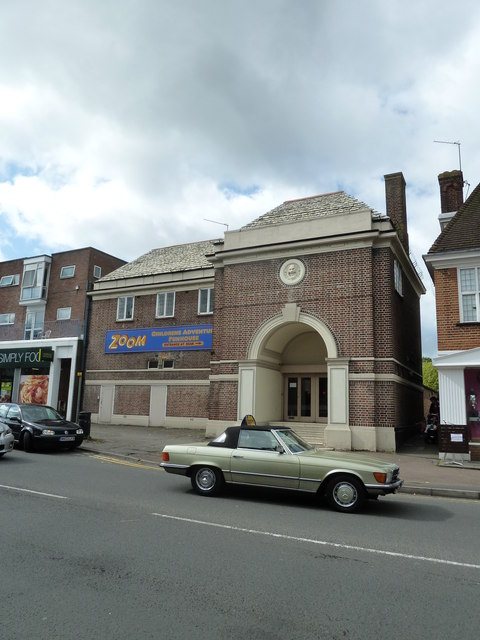

The Chiltern Cinema is a former cinema in Beaconsfield, Buckinghamshire, England was designed by renowned cinema architect W.F. Granger, and opened in late 1927. Located on Station Road, the cinema was originally called "the picture house". The seating was around 500, and the auditorium had no balcony. The screen was always 4:3 format (not widescreen), so letterbox vision was complusary on some films.

The exterior was of a neo-classical architecture, so consequently, did not look like the average cinema from the front. Now, as the building stands, the ornate decorations are in good condition. Above the old main entrance, some dirt interference smothers the brickwork. This is where "THE CHILTERN" logo was once on view.

The cinema began to decline in the mid-1980s, and surrendered to the CIC Wycombe Six, and closed almost immediately.

The building now houses a branch of the pizza restaurant chain Prezzo.
