= Beaconsfield Urban District =

Former local government area in the UK

Coordinates: 51.600873°N 0.634682°W

Beaconsfield
- Local Board District (1850-1894); Urban District (1894-1974)
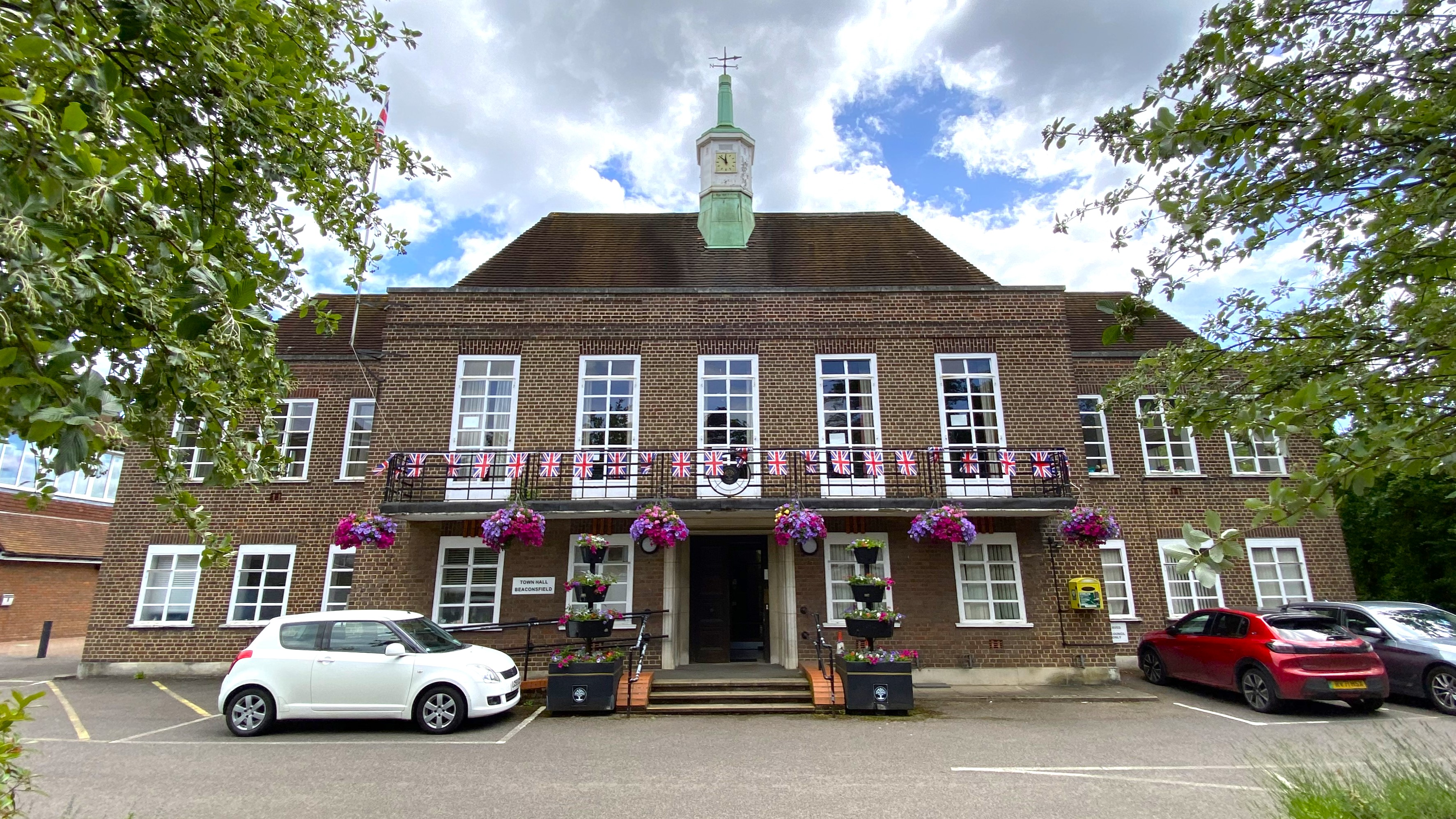
- Council's meeting place 1936–1974: Council Hall, Penn Road, Beaconsfield
- Area
  - 1911: 4,504 acres (18.2 km^{2})
  - 1961: 5,310 acres (21.5 km^{2})
- Population
  - 1901: 1,570
  - 1971: 11,150
- History
  - Created: 15 July 1850 (Local Board District); 31 December 1894 (Urban District)
  - Abolished: 31 March 1974
  - Succeeded by: Beaconsfield

The town of Beaconsfield formed a local government district in the administrative county of Buckinghamshire, England, from 1850 to 1974. It was administered as a local board district from 1850 to 1894, and as an urban district from 1894 to 1974.

== Origins ==
The parish of Beaconsfield was declared to be a local board district on 15 July 1850. Under the Local Government Act 1894, local board districts became urban districts on 31 December 1894. Beaconsfield Urban District Council held its first meeting on 4 January 1895, when John Rolfe was elected the first chairman of the council, having been the last chairman of the Beaconsfield Local Board.

== Premises ==
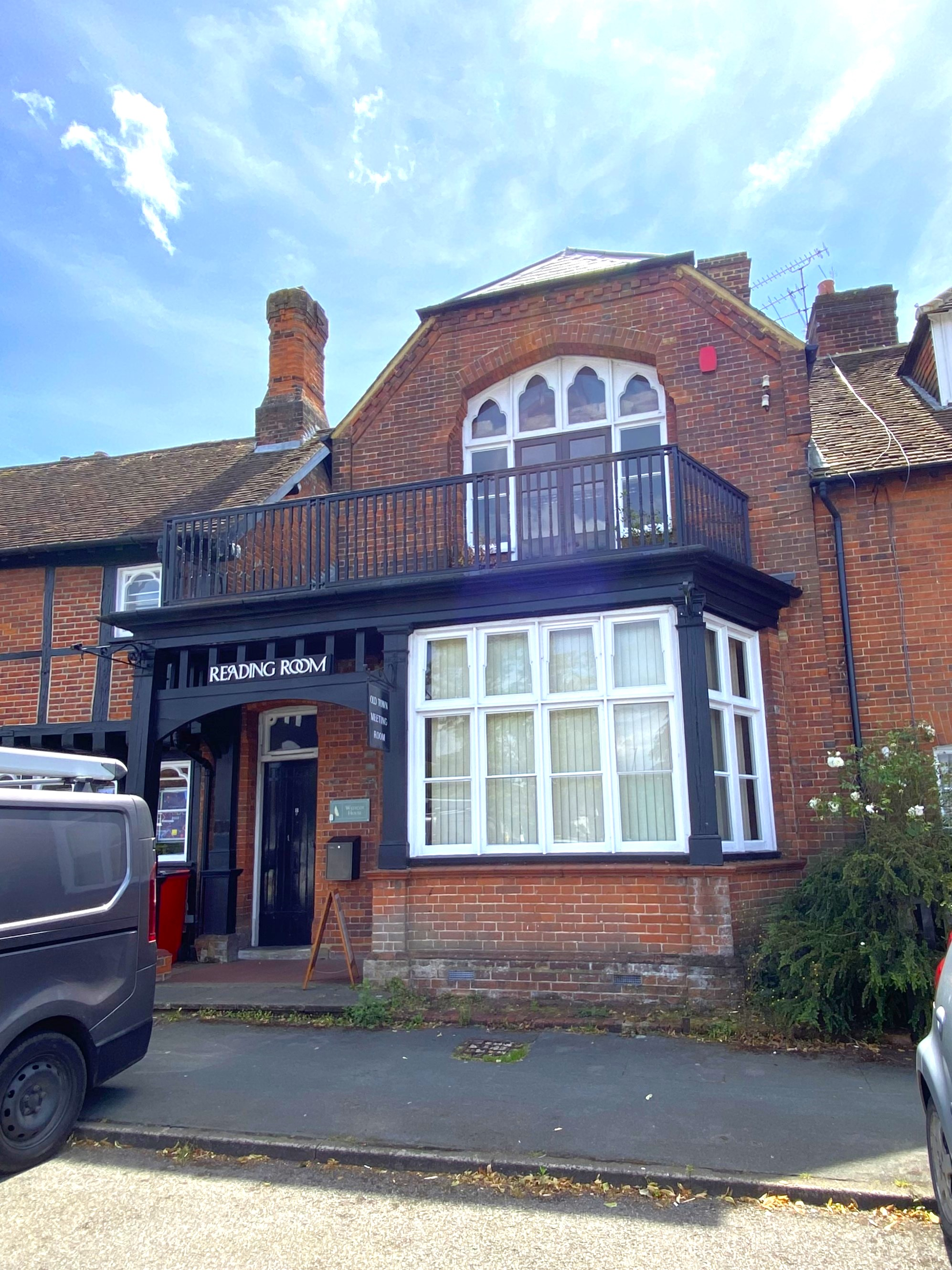
Reading Room, 8 The Broadway: Council's meeting place 1895–1915

The first meeting of Beaconsfield Urban District Council was held at the home of one of the councillors, William Harding, on Windsor End, which is also where the old local board had met. It was decided at the first meeting that more suitable premises should be found for the new council, and from the council's second meeting onwards it was based at the town's Reading Rooms at 8 The Broadway, Wycombe End.

The council remained based at the Reading Rooms until January 1915, when it moved to a new building called "Council Hall" on the southern corner of Burkes Road and Station Road. This building was not owned by the council, but had been designed and built privately with the intention that the council would lease the council chamber and offices there. The building was called "Council Hall" to distinguish it from the "Town Hall", which was a public hall used for functions and entertainment, which had been built in 1911 on the opposite corner of Burkes Road and Station Road.

A new Council Hall was built in 1936 on Penn Road, which served as the council's offices until its abolition in 1974. The 1915 Council Hall on Burkes Road became shops and offices called Burkes Court.

== Abolition ==
Beaconsfield Urban District was abolished under the Local Government Act 1972. The area merged with parts of Eton Rural District to form Beaconsfield District, which in April 1980 was renamed South Bucks District. A successor parish was established to cover the former area of Beaconsfield Urban District, with its council taking the name Beaconsfield Town Council. The 1936 Council Hall in Penn Road became the headquarters of Beaconsfield Town Council, and the building was subsequently renamed Town Hall.
