= 2025 Buckinghamshire Council election =

2025 English local election

- 1 May 2025

97 seats to Buckinghamshire Council 49 seats needed for a majority
- Turnout: 36%
	First party	Second party	Third party
Leader	Martin Tett	Susan Morgan
Party	Conservative	Liberal Democrats	Independent
Leader's seat	Little Chalfont & Amersham	Aylesbury North
Last election	113 seats, 47.5%	15 seats, 20.2%	6 seats, 5.3%
Seats before	105	13	16
Seats won	48	27	11
Seat change	▼57	▲14	▼5
Percentage	31.4%	26.4%	8.8%
	Fourth party	Fifth party	Sixth party
Leader			Gregory Smith
Party	Labour	Reform	Green
Leader's seat			Bernwood
Last election	4 seats, 14.2%	0 seats, 0.1%	1 seat, 8.1%
Seats before	6	1	1
Seats won	4	3	2
Seat change	▼2	▲2	▲1
Percentage	9.6%	19.7%	3.2%
	Seventh party	Eighth party
Leader	Julia Wassell
Party	Wycombe Independents	Ind. Network
Leader's seat	Totteridge & Bowerdean	West Wycombe
Last election	6 seats, 2.3%	2 seats, 0.6%
Seats before	2	2
Seats won	2	0
Seat change	Steady	▼2
Percentage	0.8%	n/a

- Council composition after the election
Leader before election
Martin Tett
Conservative
Leader after election
Steven Broadbent
Conservative
No overall control

The 2025 Buckinghamshire Council election was held on 1 May 2025 (the same day as other local elections) to elect members to Buckinghamshire Council in Buckinghamshire, England. 97 members were elected, down from 147.

Prior to the election, the council was under Conservative majority control, led by Martin Tett. Following the election, the council went under no overall control, with the Conservatives falling one seat short of a majority. This was the first election in the history of Buckinghamshire Council or its predecessor Buckinghamshire County Council at which the Conservative Party did not win a majority of councillor seats. After the election, Martin Tett resigned as leader, and a Conservative minority administration formed to run the council. The new Conservative group leader, Steven Broadbent, was formally confirmed as leader of the council at the subsequent annual council meeting on 21 May 2025.

== Background ==
At the 2021 election, the Conservatives won a majority of seats. The 2025 election was held under new ward boundaries.

== Previous council composition ==
Party	Seats	
Party	After 2021 election	Before 2025 election
Conservative	113	105
Liberal Democrats	15	13
Labour	4	6
Wycombe Independents	6	2
Ind. Network	2	2
Green	1	1
Reform	0	1
Independent	6	16
Vacant	0	1

=== Changes ===
- May 2022: Cameron Branston (Conservative) resigns – by-election held June 2022
- June 2022: Sue Lewin (Liberal Democrats) gains by-election from Conservatives
- December 2022: Andrea Baughan and Steve Guy (Wycombe Independents) join Labour
- June 2023: Paul Bass (Conservative) resigns – by-election held July 2023
- July 2023: Jaspal Singh Chhokar (Conservative) wins by-election
- September 2023: Warren Whyte (Conservative) resigns – by-election held November 2023; Nabeela Rana (Wycombe Independents) joins Conservatives
- November 2023: Anja Schaefer (Liberal Democrats) gains by-election from Conservatives; Ron Gaffney (Conservative) dies – by-election held February 2024; David Anthony (Conservative) resigns – by-election held February 2024
- February 2024: Steven Roy (Conservative) and David Moore (Conservative) win by-elections
- July 2024: Matt Knight (Wycombe Independents) leaves party to sit as an independent
- November 2024: Diana Blamires (Conservatives) leaves party to sit as an independent;
- December 2024: Jonathan Rush (Conservative) dies – seat left vacant until 2025 election; Jonathan Waters (Conservative) joins Liberal Democrats
- January 2025: Alan Turner (Conservative) leaves party to sit as an independent
- February 2025: Mary Baldwin, Anders Christensen, Sarah James, Steven Lambert, and Adam Poland-Goodyer (Liberal Democrats) leave party to sit as independents; Andrew Wood (Conservative) leaves party to sit as an independent; Paul Irwin (Conservative) joins Reform UK
- Luisa Sullivan (Conservative) leaves party to sit as an independent

== Summary ==
2025 Buckinghamshire Council election
Party	Candidates	Seats	Gains	Losses	Net gain/loss	Seats %	Votes %	Votes	+/−
Conservative	97	48	N/A	N/A	N/A	49.5	31.4	96,929	-16.1
Liberal Democrats	95	27	N/A	N/A	N/A	27.8	26.4	81,482	+6.2
Independent	37	11	N/A	N/A	N/A	11.3	8.8	27,175	+3.5
Labour	79	4	N/A	N/A	N/A	4.1	9.6	29,593	-4.6
Reform	92	3	N/A	N/A	N/A	3.1	19.7	60,652	+19.6
Green	33	2	N/A	N/A	N/A	2.1	3.2	9,796	-4.9
Wycombe Independent	2	2	N/A	N/A	N/A	2.1	0.8	2,326	-1.5
SDP	3	0	N/A	N/A	N/A	0	0.1	273	+0.1
TUSC	1	0	N/A	N/A	N/A	0	<0.1	40	±0.0
Heritage	1	0	N/A	N/A	N/A	0	<0.1	27	±0.0

== Ward results ==
=== Abbey ===
Abbey (2 seats)
Party	Candidate	Votes	%	±%
Conservative	Lesley Mary Clarke*	1,021	43.3	
Conservative	Mahboob Bhatti Hussain*	659	28.0	
Labour	Michelle Parry	580	24.6	
Labour	Adam Eveleigh	561	23.8	
Reform	Richard Russell	390	16.9	
Independent	Rani Chanda Sahar	340	14.4	
Liberal Democrats	Tamsin Nicola Holkham	281	11.9	
Independent	Aatif Masood Kayyani	275	11.7	
Liberal Democrats	Sophie Charlotte Lou	258	10.9	
Majority				
Turnout		2,357	26	
Conservative win (new seat)				
Conservative win (new seat)				

=== Amersham & Chesham Bois ===
Amersham & Chesham Bois (3 seats)
Party	Candidate	Votes	%	±%
Liberal Democrats	Mark Andrew Roberts	2,996	48.2	
Liberal Democrats	Dominic John Pinkney	2,924	47.0	
Liberal Democrats	Kelly Thornton	2,906	46.7	
Conservative	David William King*	2,335	37.5	
Conservative	Arvind Maheshwari	1,936	31.1	
Conservative	Sharad Kumar Jha	1,910	30.7	
Reform	Robin Harker	914	14.7	
Reform	Jay Andrews	839	13.5	
Reform	Jesper Hausner Andersen	773	12.4	
Labour	Gavin Bruce Page	359	5.8	
Independent	Christopher Charles Mellor	271	4.4	
Majority				
Turnout		6,219	45	
Liberal Democrats win (new seat)				
Liberal Democrats win (new seat)				
Liberal Democrats win (new seat)				

=== Aston Clinton and Weston Turville ===
Aston Clinton & Weston Turville (2 seats)
Party	Candidate	Votes	%	±%
Conservative	Mike Collins*	914	35.6	
Conservative	Steve Bowles*	910	35.5	
Reform	John Barker	794	30.9	
Reform	Robert Knight	709	27.6	
Liberal Democrats	Jeremy Hodge	449	17.5	
Liberal Democrats	Sally Barham	410	16.0	
Labour	Helen Rosemary Jones	341	13.3	
Green	Coral Simpson	261	10.2	
Labour	Philip McGoldrick	196	7.6	
Majority				
Turnout		2,566	35	
Conservative win (new seat)				
Conservative win (new seat)				

=== Aylesbury East ===
Aylesbury East (2 seats)
Party	Candidate	Votes	%	±%
Conservative	Mark Edward Winn*	1,189	35.5	
Conservative	Andy Huxley	989	29.5	
Liberal Democrats	Christopher Caradoc Williams	985	29.4	
Liberal Democrats	Chris Hendren	893	26.6	
Reform	Paul Alan Hobbs	815	24.3	
Reform	Miriam Joy Thomas	671	20.0	
Labour	Matthew Small	296	8.8	
Labour	Gerry Vece	267	8.0	
Green	Mark Wheeler	214	6.4	
Majority				
Turnout		3,352	35	
Conservative win (new seat)				
Conservative win (new seat)				

=== Aylesbury North ===
Aylesbury North (2 seats)
Party	Candidate	Votes	%	±%
Liberal Democrats	Raj Wali Khan*	1,108	41.2	
Liberal Democrats	Susan Ann Morgan*	1,094	40.7	
Reform	Margaret Yvonne Crompton	507	18.8	
Reform	Stephen Swain	437	16.2	
Labour	Tina Cardy	412	15.3	
Labour	Rob Marshall	376	14.0	
Conservative	Kieran George Kevin Guilfoyle Coburn	358	13.3	
Conservative	Sophie Elizabeth Vaughan-Evans	331	12.3	
Green	Colin Norman Bloxham	226	8.4	
Independent	Alex Slater	43	1.6	
TUSC	Paul John Tovey	40	1.5	
Majority				
Turnout		2,691	29	
Liberal Democrats win (new seat)				
Liberal Democrats win (new seat)				

=== Aylesbury North West ===
Aylesbury North West (2 seats)
Party	Candidate	Votes	%	±%
Liberal Democrats	Tuffail Hussain*	1,051	49.1	
Liberal Democrats	Gurinder Wadhwa*	900	42.1	
Reform	Dawn Charlton	525	24.5	
Conservative	Denise Andree Summers*	377	17.6	
Labour	Ian Hayton	286	13.4	
Conservative	Charles Anthony Adomah-Boadi	282	13.2	
Green	Kai Simmons	220	10.3	
Majority				
Turnout		2,140	26	
Liberal Democrats win (new seat)				
Liberal Democrats win (new seat)				

=== Aylesbury South East ===
Aylesbury South East (2 seats)
Party	Candidate	Votes	%	±%
Liberal Democrats	Sherrilyn Anne Bateman	944	29.7	
Liberal Democrats	Tim Dixon*	903	28.4	
Reform	Matt Webb	774	24.4	
Reform	Bryn Blake	718	22.6	
Conservative	Prakash Kumar Dey	661	20.8	
Conservative	Milika Ahsan	657	20.7	
Labour	Mark Trevor Bateman	563	17.7	
Labour	Arden Elle Marshall	477	15.0	
Green	Greg Smith	232	7.3	
Majority				
Turnout		3,176	35	
Liberal Democrats win (new seat)				
Liberal Democrats win (new seat)				

=== Aylesbury South West ===
Aylesbury South West (2 seats)
Party	Candidate	Votes	%	±%
Liberal Democrats	Waheed Raja*	1,042	40.2	
Liberal Democrats	Niknam Hussain*	982	37.9	
Reform	Mike Attrill	557	21.5	
Reform	Mark Alan Thompson	498	19.2	
Labour	Ansar Gulzar	413	15.9	
Labour	Tanya Warshaw	411	15.9	
Conservative	Gillian Ann Neale-Sheppard	346	13.4	
Conservative	Sarah Sproat	285	11.0	
Green	Julie Elizabeth Atkins	243	9.4	
Majority				
Turnout		2,590	31	
Liberal Democrats win (new seat)				
Liberal Democrats win (new seat)				

=== Aylesbury West ===
Aylesbury West (2 seats)
Party	Candidate	Votes	%	±%
Liberal Democrats	Nidhi Mehta	809	26.7	
Liberal Democrats	Alan Neale Sherwell	808	26.7	
Independent	Sarah James*	697	23.0	
Independent	Adam Goodyer-Poland*	656	21.7	
Reform	Robert Alan Brook	587	19.4	
Reform	Chris Kerley	529	17.5	
Conservative	Jimi Awosika	372	12.3	
Labour	Lily Charlotte Crawford	358	11.8	
Conservative	Natalie Roberts	353	11.7	
Labour	Vernon Clive Sharples	279	9.2	
Reform	Raj Pasupuleti	172	5.7	
Green	Andrew James Capjon	141	4.7	
Majority				
Turnout		3,028	33	
Liberal Democrats win (new seat)				
Liberal Democrats win (new seat)				

=== Beaconsfield ===
Beaconsfield (2 seats)
Party	Candidate	Votes	%	±%
Conservative	Jackson Ng*	1,266	39.4	
Liberal Democrats	Christine Elisabeth Adali	1,016	31.6	
Conservative	Alastair John Pike	858	26.7	
Liberal Democrats	Susanne Lee Hardvendel	851	26.5	
Independent	Alison Jane Wheelhouse*	793	24.7	
Reform	Elaine Ann Daley-Yates	494	15.4	
Reform	Chris Grimes-Crompton	490	15.2	
Green	Geoffrey Martyn Bourne	139	4.3	
Labour	Alison Carolyn Raby	100	3.1	
Labour	Gary Beckwith	92	2.9	
Majority				
Turnout		3,217	35	
Conservative win (new seat)				
Liberal Democrats win (new seat)				

=== Berryfields, Buckingham Park & Watermead ===
Berryfields, Buckingham Park & Watermead (2 seats)
Party	Candidate	Votes	%	±%
Reform	Cameron Anderson	748	27.7	
Liberal Democrats	Chirag Sailesh Chotai	724	26.8	
Reform	Annelise Jane Attrill	723	26.8	
Conservative	John Yandrapati	692	25.6	
Liberal Democrats	Ashley Richard Morgan	594	22.0	
Conservative	Ashley Graham Bond*	568	21.0	
Labour	Matthew Clayton	388	14.4	
Labour	Lindsey Poole	383	14.2	
Green	Bruce Francis Hope	212	7.8	
Independent	Christopher Card	74	2.7	
Majority				
Turnout		2,701	29	
Reform win (new seat)				
Liberal Democrats win (new seat)				

=== Bierton, Kingsbrook and Wing ===
Bierton, Kingsbrook and Wing (2 seats)
Party	Candidate	Votes	%	±%
Conservative	Julie Elizabeth Ward*	830	28.1	
Reform	Kathy Gibbon	642	21.8	
Reform	Luke McGuffie	580	19.7	
Conservative	Khalid Khan	517	17.5	
Independent	Helen Rebecca Sunday	466	15.8	
Labour	Alison Frances Morris	455	15.4	
Independent	Sanchia Davidson	436	14.8	
Labour	Eris Reynold Robertson	430	14.6	
Liberal Democrats	Phanindar Koya	417	14.1	
Green	Ian Davidson	322	10.9	
Liberal Democrats	Sam Mitchell-Wadhwa	285	9.7	
Majority				
Turnout		2,950	35	
Conservative win (new seat)				
Reform win (new seat)				

=== Booker and Cressex ===
Booker and Cressex
Party	Candidate	Votes	%	±%
Conservative	Arman Alam*	475	34.5	
Reform	Brian Pearce	385	28.0	
Labour	Philippe Lefevre	354	25.7	
Liberal Democrats	Michael George Mill	162	11.8	
Majority				
Turnout		1,376	31	
Conservative win (new seat)				

=== Buckingham ===
Buckingham (3 seats)
Party	Candidate	Votes	%	±%
Labour	Robin Stuchbury*	2,252	45.4	
Liberal Democrats	Anja Schaefer*	1,255	25.3	
Conservative	Ade Osibogun*	1,226	24.7	
Labour	Fran Davies	1,217	24.5	
Conservative	Howard James Mordue*	1,199	24.2	
Reform	Richard Charles Burdon	1,175	23.7	
Labour	Lucy Elizabeth Draper	1,115	22.5	
Conservative	Jane Margaret Mordue	1,070	21.6	
Reform	Nuala Kelly	996	20.1	
Liberal Democrats	Robert Laurence Francis Brignall	946	19.1	
Reform	Sundeep Bhupendar Singh	890	17.9	
Liberal Democrats	Nick Jackson	826	16.7	
Majority				
Turnout		4,960	36	
Labour win (new seat)				
Liberal Democrats win (new seat)				
Conservative win (new seat)				

=== Burnham ===
Burnham (3 seats)
Party	Candidate	Votes	%	±%
Conservative	Paul James Kelly*	1,289	37.9	
Conservative	Kirsten Ashman*	1,120	32.9	
Reform	Cole Caesar	1,078	31.7	
Conservative	Santokh Singh Chhokar*	952	28.0	
Reform	Carole Doel	945	27.8	
Reform	Michele Le Tissier	929	27.3	
Liberal Democrats	Carol Lesley Linton	760	22.3	
Liberal Democrats	Mark Ian Boden	653	19.2	
Liberal Democrats	Roxanna Pasha	544	16.0	
Labour	Avinash Shinde	479	14.1	
Labour	Alexa Anne Collins	444	13.0	
Labour	Carter Ellen	370	10.9	
Majority				
Turnout		3,405	28	
Conservative win (new seat)				
Conservative win (new seat)				
Reform win (new seat)				

=== Castlefield & Oakridge ===
Castlefield & Oakridge (2 seats)
Party	Candidate	Votes	%	±%
Labour	Majid Hussain*	1,419	50.5	
Conservative	Mohammad Ayub*	1,313	46.7	
Labour	Karen Bates*	1,128	40.1	
Conservative	Mariana Rughinis	906	32.2	
Reform	Julia Ginger	172	6.1	
Reform	Simon Istef	135	4.8	
Liberal Democrats	Hartley Hills Patterson	130	4.6	
Liberal Democrats	Alison May Harmsworth	129	4.6	
Majority				
Turnout		2,812	36	
Labour win (new seat)				
Conservative win (new seat)				

=== Chalfont St Giles & Little Chalfont ===
Chalfont St Giles & Little Chalfont (3 seats)
Party	Candidate	Votes	%	±%
Conservative	Martin Tett*	2,269	44.2	
Conservative	Carl James Jackson*	2,173	42.3	
Conservative	Simon Paul Rouse*	2,141	41.7	
Liberal Democrats	Jane Elizabeth Chamberlain	2,050	39.9	
Liberal Democrats	Rob Gill	1,947	37.9	
Liberal Democrats	Grant Alexander Kirkby	1,636	31.8	
Reform	Bertie Waters	749	14.6	
Reform	Stanislav Kudryashov	642	12.5	
Reform	Vaibhav Khandge	636	12.4	
Green	Dominick Sebastian Luke Pegram	336	6.5	
Labour	Paul Charles Harwood	166	3.2	
Majority				
Turnout		5,137	42	
Conservative win (new seat)				
Conservative win (new seat)				
Conservative win (new seat)				

=== Chalfont St Peter ===
Chalfont St Peter (2 seats)
Party	Candidate	Votes	%	±%
Conservative	Isobel Anne Darby*	1,208	32.0	
Independent	Karen Dickson	995	26.4	
Conservative	Linda Margaret Smith*	957	25.4	
Liberal Democrats	Diane Margaret Holden	912	24.2	
Independent	Anne-Marie Vladar	886	23.5	
Liberal Democrats	Pierre Louis Alexandre Roche	789	20.9	
Reform	David George Meacock	715	19.0	
Reform	Andrea Michaels	637	16.9	
Labour	Joshua Jarvis	102	2.7	
Heritage	Julian Foster	27	0.7	
Majority				
Turnout		3,770	40	
Conservative win (new seat)				
Independent win (new seat)				

=== Chesham North ===
Chesham North (3 seats)
Party	Candidate	Votes	%	±%
Liberal Democrats	Mohammad Fayyaz*	2,501	50.1	
Liberal Democrats	Justine Fulford	2,440	48.9	
Liberal Democrats	Frances Kneller	2,265	45.4	
Conservative	Jane Emma MacBean*	1,476	29.6	
Conservative	Majid Ditta	1,235	24.7	
Conservative	Qaser Chaudhry*	1,215	24.3	
Reform	Stephen Andrew Bateman	930	18.6	
Reform	Barry Harding	853	17.1	
Reform	Laurence Jarvis	841	16.8	
Labour	Alastair James Chapman-Amey	379	7.6	
Majority				
Turnout		4,992	41	
Liberal Democrats win (new seat)				
Liberal Democrats win (new seat)				
Liberal Democrats win (new seat)				

=== Chesham South ===
Chesham South (2 seats)
Party	Candidate	Votes	%	±%
Liberal Democrats	Alan Keith Bacon	1,886	48.2	
Liberal Democrats	Parveiz Aslam	1,848	47.2	
Conservative	Joseph Lisle Maurice Baum*	1,102	28.1	
Conservative	Gordon Timothy Adams	963	24.6	
Reform	William Edward Gibbon	555	14.2	
Reform	Chris Hamilton	544	13.9	
Green	Catherine Mary Lowe	307	7.8	
Green	John Edward Lowe	171	4.4	
Labour	Fiona Collins	123	3.1	
Labour	Tim Starkey	102	2.6	
Majority				
Turnout		3,916	42	
Liberal Democrats win (new seat)				
Liberal Democrats win (new seat)				

=== Chiltern Villages ===
Chiltern Villages
Party	Candidate	Votes	%	±%
Independent	Mark Lawson Turner*	810	47.8	
Conservative	David Martyn Watson*	422	24.9	
Reform	Sarah Louise Hopperton	221	13.0	
Liberal Democrats	Tony Hill	160	9.4	
Labour	Fizza Shah	83	4.9	
Majority				
Turnout		1,696	37	
Independent win (new seat)				

=== Disraeli ===
Disraeli
Party	Candidate	Votes	%	±%
Conservative	Maz Hussain*	642	42.3	
Labour	Zafer Ali	589	38.8	
Reform	Louise Gaunt	180	11.8	
Liberal Democrats	Brandon Tester	108	7.1	
Majority				
Turnout		1,519	36	
Conservative win (new seat)				

=== Downley ===
Downley
Party	Candidate	Votes	%	±%
Labour	Hazel Arthur-Hewitt	577	38.1	
Conservative	Paul Richard Turner*	559	36.9	
Reform	Richard Maddock	236	15.6	
Liberal Democrats	Ray Farmer	142	9.4	
Majority				
Turnout		1,514	33	
Labour win (new seat)				

=== Farnhams & Stoke Poges ===
Farnhams & Stoke Poges (3 seats)
Party	Candidate	Votes	%	±%
Conservative	Dev Dhillon*	1,628	46.6	
Conservative	David William Moore*	1,622	46.4	
Conservative	Thomas Neil Hogg*	1,482	42.4	
Reform	Karen Perez	916	26.2	
Reform	Val Ackrill	899	25.7	
Reform	Ben White	846	24.2	
Liberal Democrats	Andrew Cowen	622	17.8	
Liberal Democrats	Susan Pearson	613	17.5	
Liberal Democrats	Jeff Herschel	557	15.9	
Labour	Charlie Davies	287	8.2	
Labour	Randeep Singh Sidhu	262	7.5	
Labour	Samuel James Lane	253	7.2	
Majority				
Turnout		3,494	30	
Conservative win (new seat)				
Conservative win (new seat)				
Conservative win (new seat)				

=== Flackwell Heath & The Wooburns ===
Flackwell Heath & The Wooburns (3 seats)
Party	Candidate	Votes	%	±%
Independent	Penny Drayton*	2,523	54.6	
Independent	Larisa Townsend	2,456	53.2	
Independent	Stuart Wilson*	2,442	52.9	
Conservative	Kirsty Griffiths	987	21.4	
Conservative	Steven James Barrett*	888	19.2	
Reform	Carole Mary Earle	866	18.7	
Reform	Darryl Earle	828	17.9	
Conservative	Anna Robinson	795	17.2	
Reform	William Ireland	713	15.4	
Liberal Democrats	Christopher Nigel Tolmie	271	5.9	
Labour	James Lawson	265	5.7	
Labour	Christine Leech	227	4.9	
Labour	Andy Sedgwick	198	4.3	
Majority				
Turnout		4,620	35	
Independent win (new seat)				
Independent win (new seat)				
Independent win (new seat)				

=== Gerrards Cross & Denham ===
Gerrards Cross & Denham (3 seats)
Party	Candidate	Votes	%	±%
Conservative	Michael William Robert Bracken*	1,861	40.8	
Conservative	Thomas Edward Dudley Broom*	1,704	37.4	
Conservative	Jaspal Singh Chhokar*	1,700	37.3	
Reform	Sarah Davey	1,133	24.9	
Reform	Tim Greenfield	1,124	24.7	
Independent	Andrew Alexander Wood*	1,122	24.6	
Reform	John Anthony O'Keeffe	991	21.7	
Liberal Democrats	Heena Amarshi	757	16.6	
Liberal Democrats	Stuart James Victor Galloway	752	16.5	
Liberal Democrats	Sevgi Arslan	595	13.1	
Green	Bob Hundal	406	8.9	
Labour	Michael Anthony Kavanagh	274	6.0	
Labour	Mirji Ranganath	268	5.9	
Majority				
Turnout		4,559	33	
Conservative win (new seat)				
Conservative win (new seat)				
Conservative win (new seat)				

=== Grendon Underwood & The Claydons ===
Grendon Underwood & The Claydons (2 seats)
Party	Candidate	Votes	%	±%
Conservative	Frank Mahon*	1,372	45.1	
Conservative	Patrick Joseph Fealey*	1,067	35.1	
Reform	Paul Irwin*	956	31.4	
Liberal Democrats	Sarah Ruth Jeffreys	584	19.2	
Liberal Democrats	Ivo Haest	511	16.8	
Green	Clare Elisabeth Butler	457	15.0	
Labour	Marion Lynch	246	8.1	
Labour	Steve Upton	197	6.5	
Majority				
Turnout		3,043	36	
Conservative win (new seat)				
Conservative win (new seat)				

=== Haddenham & Stone ===
Haddenham & Stone (2 seats)
Party	Candidate	Votes	%	±%
Green	Greg Smith*	1,539	45.5	
Green	Maru Mormina	979	28.9	
Conservative	Steve Michael Jackson	818	24.2	
Conservative	Bobby Sibanda	806	23.8	
Reform	Sarah Kennedy	679	20.1	
Reform	Reggie Paterson	604	17.8	
Liberal Democrats	Steven Michael Judge	416	12.3	
Liberal Democrats	Carmel Traynor	344	10.2	
Labour	Annie Baughan	266	7.9	
SDP	George Julian Millo	85	2.5	
Majority				
Turnout		3,385	39	
Green win (new seat)				
Green win (new seat)				

=== Hazlemere ===
Hazlemere (2 seats)
Party	Candidate	Votes	%	±%
Independent	Ed Gemmell*	1,334	48.7	
Conservative	Catherine Joan Oliver*	923	33.7	
Reform	Matthew James Dean	681	24.8	
Conservative	Mimi Harker*	680	24.8	
Liberal Democrats	Robert James Steenkamp	546	19.9	
Reform	John Geoffrey Rhodes	543	19.8	
Liberal Democrats	Dominique Macfarlane	372	13.6	
Majority				
Turnout		2,741	36	
Independent win (new seat)				
Conservative win (new seat)				

=== Horwood ===
Horwood
Party	Candidate	Votes	%	±%
Conservative	John Robert Chilver*	514	34.6	
Reform	Steph Harwood	469	31.6	
Labour	Stanley Cohen	211	14.2	
Liberal Democrats	Ciaran Bradley Smith	188	12.7	
Green	Janet Pentony	102	6.9	
Majority				
Turnout		1,484	38	
Conservative win (new seat)				

=== Iver ===
Iver (2 seats)
Party	Candidate	Votes	%	±%
Conservative	Wendy Allison Matthews*	743	30.0	
Independent	Paul James Griffin*	721	29.1	
Conservative	Prerna Lau Bhardwaj	579	23.4	
Independent	Luisa Katherine Sullivan*	544	22.0	
Reform	Alison Elizabeth Mueller	515	20.8	
Reform	Richard Stuttard	507	20.5	
Liberal Democrats	Julie Cook	383	15.5	
Labour	Nadeem Siddiqui	249	10.1	
Labour	Erin Lyon	230	9.3	
Liberal Democrats	Martin Bol Deng Aleu	161	6.5	
Majority				
Turnout		2,474	28	
Conservative win (new seat)				
Independent win (new seat)				

=== Ivinghoe ===
Ivinghoe (2 seats)
Party	Candidate	Votes	%	±%
Conservative	Peter Charles Brazier*	1,105	34.3	
Conservative	Chris Poll*	1,081	33.6	
Labour	Harry Robert Murgatroyd	735	22.8	
Labour	Trish Owen	679	21.1	
Reform	Andrew Eaves	635	19.7	
Reform	Amanda Linda Trayte	630	19.6	
Green	Johanna Wheeler	372	11.5	
Green	Michael John Culverhouse	369	11.5	
Liberal Democrats	Andrew John Cole	332	10.3	
Liberal Democrats	Jeremy Leonard	226	7.0	
Majority				
Turnout		3,221	36	
Conservative win (new seat)				
Conservative win (new seat)				

=== Long Crendon ===
Long Crendon
Party	Candidate	Votes	%	±%
Conservative	Clive Burke Harriss*	591	36.6	
Green	Paul Baillieu Norman	456	28.3	
Reform	Miff Chichester	284	17.6	
Liberal Democrats	Julian Alexander Newman	216	13.4	
Labour	Andy Blackaby-Iles	66	4.1	
Majority				
Turnout		1,613	37	
Conservative win (new seat)				

=== Marlow ===
Marlow (3 seats)
Party	Candidate	Votes	%	±%
Liberal Democrats	Anna Victoria Crabtree	1,937	37.6	
Conservative	Alex Collingwood*	1,733	33.7	
Conservative	Carol Heap*	1,593	30.9	
Conservative	Jocelyn Towns*	1,533	29.8	
Liberal Democrats	James Robert Currie	1,357	26.3	
Independent	Mark Andrew Skoyles	1,275	24.8	
Liberal Democrats	Ivan Sheiham	1,167	22.7	
Reform	John Ansell	934	18.1	
Reform	Terry Bowman	863	16.8	
Reform	Tobias Da Costa	768	14.9	
Green	Colin John Beckley	479	9.3	
Labour	Andy Ford	377	7.3	
Labour	Alessandra Barrow	300	5.8	
Labour	Josh Pert	196	3.8	
Majority				
Turnout		5,150	38	
Liberal Democrats win (new seat)				
Conservative win (new seat)				
Conservative win (new seat)				

=== Marsh & Micklefield ===
Marsh & Micklefield (2 seats)
Party	Candidate	Votes	%	±%
Independent	Trevor Snaith	733	37.9	
Independent	Khalil Ahmed	639	33.0	
Liberal Democrats	Paula Louise Lee	628	32.5	
Liberal Democrats	Ian Douglas Morton	622	32.1	
Labour	Ian Bates	276	14.3	
Conservative	Nabeela Naheed Rana*	269	13.9	
Labour	Julie Wilkinson	247	12.8	
Conservative	Khadija Maaref	232	12.0	
Majority				
Turnout		1,935	23	
Independent win (new seat)				
Independent win (new seat)				

=== Newton Longville ===
Newton Longville (2 seats)
Party	Candidate	Votes	%	±%
Conservative	Caroline Labiba Cornell*	886	35.2	
Conservative	Jilly Jordan*	843	33.5	
Reform	Alison Huizeling	691	27.4	
Reform	Robert Leslie Rice	668	26.5	
Liberal Democrats	Andrew Jones	571	22.7	
Liberal Democrats	Malcolm Newing	505	20.1	
Labour	Daniel Richard Storey	354	14.1	
Labour	Nicholas George Lyon	221	8.8	
Green	Alison Clare Hockings	180	7.1	
Majority				
Turnout		2,518	33	
Conservative win (new seat)				
Conservative win (new seat)				

=== Penn, Tylers Green & Loudwater ===
Penn, Tylers Green & Loudwater (2 seats)
Party	Candidate	Votes	%	±%
Liberal Democrats	Michael George West	1,495	41.4	
Liberal Democrats	Jonathan David Hammond Waters*	1,416	39.2	
Conservative	Nathan Andrew Thomas*	1,115	30.9	
Conservative	Katrina Suzanne Atkins Wood*	1,050	29.1	
Reform	Philip Hudson	784	21.7	
Reform	Paul Strange	743	20.6	
Labour	Steve Guy*	223	6.2	
Labour	Karl Newton	207	5.7	
Majority				
Turnout		3,608	36	
Liberal Democrats win (new seat)				
Liberal Democrats win (new seat)				

=== Princes Risborough ===
Princes Risborough (2 seats)
Party	Candidate	Votes	%	±%
Conservative	Gary Charles Hall*	1,208	35.8	
Conservative	Matthew John Walsh*	1,173	34.8	
Liberal Democrats	Ian Andrew Churchill	1,031	30.6	
Liberal Democrats	Audoen Marian Healy	848	25.2	
Independent	Andy Ball	543	16.1	
Reform	John Colinswood	529	15.7	
Reform	Ed Bussey	524	15.5	
Independent	Josephine Nneka Biss	325	9.6	
Independent	Ian Michael Parkinson	195	5.8	
Labour	Richard John Pither	178	5.3	
Majority				
Turnout		3,370	40	
Conservative win (new seat)				
Conservative win (new seat)				

=== Quainton ===
Quainton (1 seat)
Party	Candidate	Votes	%	±%
Conservative	Phil Gomm*	757	41.8	
Liberal Democrats	Ben Harris	610	33.7	
Reform	Brandon Lee Martin	272	15.0	
Labour	Maxine Myatt	102	5.6	
Green	Nicola Smith	70	3.9	
Majority				
Turnout		1,811	46	
Conservative win (new seat)				

=== Ridgeway East ===
Ridgeway East (2 seats)
Party	Candidate	Votes	%	±%
Conservative	David James Carroll*	1,488	46.9	
Conservative	Steven Broadbent*	1,415	44.6	
Reform	Russell Warren Jarvis	775	24.4	
Reform	Sid Sibthorp	644	20.3	
Liberal Democrats	Bob Bradnock	621	19.6	
Liberal Democrats	Dave Frearson	485	15.3	
Green	David Stephen Hughes	291	9.2	
Labour	Lynne Patricia Upton	240	7.6	
SDP	Yvonne Dorette Wilding	154	4.9	
Majority				
Turnout		3,170	37	
Conservative win (new seat)				
Conservative win (new seat)				

=== Ridgeway West ===
Ridgeway West (2 seats)
Party	Candidate	Votes	%	±%
Conservative	Robert Peter Flavio Carington*	1,202	40.6	
Conservative	Shade Adoh*	1,071	36.1	
Reform	Graham Stuart Liggins	759	25.6	
Reform	Russell Matthew Shea	569	19.2	
Independent	Victoria Nuthall	502	16.9	
Liberal Democrats	Ian Kenneth Leeper	484	16.3	
Liberal Democrats	Bernadette Graham	419	14.1	
Green	Gemma Tracy McGough-Colin	252	8.5	
Independent	David Wallace	232	7.8	
Labour	David Frank Riddington	171	5.8	
Majority				
Turnout		2,964	34	
Conservative win (new seat)				
Conservative win (new seat)				

=== Sands ===
Sands
Party	Candidate	Votes	%	±%
Independent	Darren John Hayday*	671	42.6	
Conservative	Zia Ahmed	517	32.8	
Reform	Alex Sayles	193	12.3	
Labour	Alex Charilaou	132	8.4	
Liberal Democrats	Daniel John Bellamy	61	3.9	
Majority				
Turnout		1,574	33	
Independent win (new seat)				

=== Terriers & Amersham Hill ===
Terriers & Amersham Hill (2 seats)
Party	Candidate	Votes	%	±%
Conservative	Sarfaraz Khan Raja*	612	25.9	
Labour	Chris Chilton	591	25.0	
Labour	Amanda Whyte	588	24.9	
Conservative	Tony Green*	571	24.2	
Independent	Leigh Anthony Casey	468	19.8	
Independent	Amber Elizabeth China	464	19.7	
Reform	Glenn William Brown	321	13.6	
Reform	Richard Neal Phoenix	309	13.1	
Liberal Democrats	Toni Belinda Brodelle	247	10.5	
Liberal Democrats	Cheryl Anne Strutt	195	8.3	
Green	Joe Eyers	124	5.3	
Majority				
Turnout		2,360	30	
Conservative win (new seat)				
Labour win (new seat)				

=== The Missendens ===
The Missendens (3 seats)
Party	Candidate	Votes	%	±%
Conservative	Peter Ernest Charles Martin*	1,748	33.8	
Conservative	Heather Maree Wallace*	1,642	31.7	
Liberal Democrats	Matthew William Hind	1,633	31.6	
Conservative	Rachael Sara Matthews*	1,541	29.8	
Liberal Democrats	Thomas Michael Edward Pirouet	1,380	26.7	
Liberal Democrats	Mark William Titterington	1,294	25.0	
Reform	David McConnell	1,133	21.9	
Reform	Jane Hewitt	1,106	21.4	
Reform	Bill Power	941	18.2	
Independent	Catherine Bunting	689	13.3	
Independent	Caralyn Jane Bains	647	12.5	
Independent	Ross Paul Pusey	598	11.6	
Green	Ivanina Minkova	345	6.7	
Labour	Mahamid Mustafa Ahmed	177	3.4	
Majority				
Turnout		5,175	40	
Conservative win (new seat)				
Conservative win (new seat)				
Liberal Democrats win (new seat)				

=== Totteridge & Bowerdean ===
Totteridge & Bowerdean (2 seats)
Party	Candidate	Votes	%	±%
Wycombe Independents	Julia Denise Wassell*	1,179	42.4	
Wycombe Independents	Imran Hussain*	1,147	41.3	
Liberal Democrats	Chaudhry Ansar	767	27.6	
Liberal Democrats	Ben James Holkham	662	23.8	
Reform	Mark Adrian Adkins	394	14.2	
Labour	Karen Carter	303	10.9	
Reform	Stephen Lugg	298	10.7	
Labour	Henry Oriabure	245	8.8	
Conservative	Richard David Peters	154	5.5	
Conservative	Lakshan Wanigasooriya	130	4.7	
SDP	Adam James Williams	34	1.2	
Majority				
Turnout		2,779	34	
Wycombe Independents win (new seat)				
Wycombe Independents win (new seat)				

=== Waddesdon ===
Waddesdon
Party	Candidate	Votes	%	±%
Conservative	Ashley Waite*	778	44.4	
Reform	Bec Small	475	27.1	
Liberal Democrats	Steve Terry	212	12.1	
Labour	Hannah Hulme Hunter	173	9.9	
Green	Mark Rutherford	114	6.5	
Majority				
Turnout		1,752	37	
Conservative win (new seat)				

=== Wendover, Halton & Stoke Mandeville ===
Wendover, Halton & Stoke Mandeville (2 seats)
Party	Candidate	Votes	%	±%
Liberal Democrats	Dean Victor Field	1,050	36.2	
Conservative	Peter Derek Strachan*	993	34.3	
Liberal Democrats	Seb Berry	961	33.1	
Conservative	Alan Harold Turner*	754	26.0	
Reform	Humphrey George Grimmett	648	22.4	
Reform	Shev Toussaint	561	19.4	
Green	Joanne Elizabeth Hodge	280	9.7	
Labour	Colin Phillips	200	6.9	
Green	Tom Hodge	162	5.6	
Majority				
Turnout		2,899	34	
Liberal Democrats win (new seat)				
Conservative win (new seat)				

=== West Wycombe & Lane End ===
West Wycombe & Lane End (1 seat)
Party	Candidate	Votes	%	±%
Independent	Orsolya Hayday*	811	52.5	
Conservative	Dominic Heaton Goodall Barnes*	291	18.8	
Reform	Paul Fairfax	285	18.4	
Labour	Johnathan Guy	82	5.3	
Liberal Democrats	Neil Christopher Timberlake	76	4.9	
Majority				
Turnout		1,545	35	
Independent win (new seat)				

=== Winslow ===
Winslow
Party	Candidate	Votes	%	±%
Liberal Democrats	Llew Monger	583	32.4	
Independent	Diana Blamires*	499	27.7	
Reform	Danny King	316	17.5	
Labour	Josh Hunter	184	10.2	
Conservative	Oliver Daniel Rhodes	163	9.1	
Green	Mary Hunt	56	3.1	
Majority				
Turnout		1,801	43	
Liberal Democrats win (new seat)				

== See also ==
- Buckinghamshire Council elections
