= Buckinghamshire Council elections =

Local government elections in Buckinghamshire, England

Buckinghamshire Council was elected for the first time in 2021, with subsequent elections to be held every fourth year thereafter. A total of 147 councillors were elected, with the 49 wards electing 3 councillors each.

== Background ==
The inaugural election was supposed to be in May 2020, but was delayed due to the COVID-19 pandemic. For this reason, it was announced on 18 March 2020 that all of the current shadow authority members would become councillors and the shadow executive members would form the cabinet. The first election to the new authority was eventually held in May 2021.

== Council elections ==
Year	Con	LD	Wycombe Ind.	Lab	Ind. Network	Ref. UK	Grn	Ind	Council control after election
2021	113	15	6	4	2	0	1	6	Conservative
2025 (Note: Boundary changes reduced the number of seats by 50.)	48	27	2	4	0	3	2	11	No overall control

=== Results maps ===
2021 results map

2025 results map

== By-elections ==
=== 2021-2025 ===
Bernwood By-Election 30 June 2022
Party	Candidate	Votes	%	±%
Liberal Democrats	Sue Lewin	1,158	38.7	+21.5
Green	Richard Torpey	1,030	34.4	−3.9
Conservative	David Hughes	723	24.1	−9.8
Labour	Lindsey Poole	85	2.8	−7.7
Majority		128	4.3	
Turnout		2,996		
Liberal Democrats gain from Conservative		Swing		

Denham By-Election 27 July 2023
Party	Candidate	Votes	%	±%
Conservative	Jaspal Singh Chhokar	848	42.2	−5.7
Liberal Democrats	Julie Cook	634	31.5	+31.5
Independent	Barry Harding	404	20.1	−0.6
Labour	Nadeem Siddiqui	125	6.2	−6.9
Majority		214	10.6	
Turnout		2,011		
Conservative hold		Swing		

Buckingham East By-Election 2 November 2023
Party	Candidate	Votes	%	±%
Liberal Democrats	Anja Schaefer	690	39.8	+28.1
Conservative	Jane Mordue	593	34.2	−9.6
Labour	Fran Davies	371	21.4	+5.8
Green	Michael Culverhouse	81	4.7	−6.4
Majority		97	5.6	
Turnout		1,735		
Liberal Democrats gain from Conservative		Swing		

Farnham Common and Burnham Beeches By-Election 22 February 2024
Party	Candidate	Votes	%	±%
Conservative	David Moore	860	51.8	+0.9
Liberal Democrats	Carol Linton	689	41.5	+9.8
Labour	Alexa Collins	111	6.7	−7.1
Majority		171	10.3	
Turnout		1,660		
Conservative hold		Swing		

Hazlemere By-Election 22 February 2024
Party	Candidate	Votes	%	±%
Conservative	Steven Roy	687	36.5	−5.6
Independent	Leigh Casey	654	34.8	+34.8
Liberal Democrats	Mark Titterington	426	22.7	+13.1
Labour	Adam Dale	113	6.0	−3.2
Majority		33	1.8	
Turnout		1,880		
Conservative hold		Swing		
