= Alfriston School =

Alfriston School (formerly One time Knotty Green School)

Location
- Penn Road; Beaconsfield, Buckinghamshire, HP9 2TS; England
- Coordinates: 51.625953°N 0.654483°W

Information
- Type: Academy Special School
- Department for Education URN: 137934 Tables
- Ofsted: Reports
- Headteacher: Claire Smart
- Gender: Girls
- Age: 11 to 18
- Enrolment: 163

Alfriston School is a girls' special school in Beaconsfield, Buckinghamshire. In March 2012 the school became an Academy. It takes girls from the age of 11 through to the age of 18 and has approximately 160 pupils.

The school caters for girls with moderate learning difficulties and other special educational needs such as emotional and behavioural difficulties. The school takes girls as weekly boarders (i.e. Monday to Friday) and as day pupils.

Alfriston School is one of several Buckinghamshire schools which host mobile phone masts. Contracts between Buckinghamshire County Council and various mobile phone operators generate an income of £145,000 per annum, of which about £59,000 comes from contracts for masts that are installed in schools.
