= Beaconsfield School =

The Beaconsfield School

Location
- Wattleton Road; Beaconsfield, Buckinghamshire, HP9 1SJ; England
- 51.6029°N 0.6404°W

Information
- Type: Academy
- Motto: Discovering the Potential in All
- Department for Education URN: 139367 Tables
- Ofsted: Reports
- Chair of Governors: Jo Fisher
- Headteacher: Caroline Legg
- Staff: 103
- Gender: Co-educational
- Age: 11 to 18
- Enrolment: 870
- Website: www.beaconsfield.school

The Beaconsfield School is a co-educational secondary school and sixth form with academy status, located in Beaconsfield, Buckinghamshire, England. The school has approximately 870 pupils.

The most recent Ofsted inspection was on 12 February 2019 where a rating of 'Good' was made for all categories.

In 2006 the Department for Education and Skills (DfES) awarded the school specialist school status as an Arts College specialising in both the performing arts and the visual arts.

The Beaconsfield School is one of several Buckinghamshire schools which host mobile phone masts. Contracts between Buckinghamshire County Council and various mobile phone operators generate an income of £145,000 per annum, of which about £59,000 comes from contracts for masts that are installed in schools.

== Academy status ==
The school began its academy consultation on 12 December 2011. It sent letters to parents on that date, detailing plans of discussion about converting to an academy. It held a presentation in the main hall on 25 January 2012 for parents and wider community stakeholders.

The school formally converted to academy status on 1 March 2013.

== Site ==
The school consists of one main block, a sports hall and various buildings that lead off the main building. The site also has a recently built terrapin which houses a local nursery.

The main building is three stories high, the second floor (A floor) has three Science labs, three dedicated Science room, and three Modern Foreign Languages classrooms. It also has access to the Drama studio's balcony. The first floor (B floor) has one ICT suite, five math classrooms, one media suite fitted with 15 Mac computers, one religious studies classroom, two history classrooms and a large drama studio fitted with electric lighting, a switchboard and a large music system. The ground floor (C floor) holds the reception, headteachers office, medical room, six English classrooms, and a large locker room. On the far left staircase (M floor) there are three mezzanine classrooms and an office. This includes a music classroom, an ICT suite, and a business studies classroom.

Leading from the C floor is the technology block (D block) which holds specialist rooms for food technology, textiles, graphic products/design with 25 computers, wood technology and metal works. The D block also includes a sixth form common room, the Learning Resource Center, the library, the music practice rooms, a geography classroom, and an animation suite and two art rooms.

The E block includes the staff room, several staff offices, two geography classrooms, the main school hall, the Hub (canteen), a health and social care classroom, a drama classroom including a recording studio and an exam hall.
