= 2021 Buckinghamshire Council election =

← 2017	6 May 2021	2025 →

147 seats on the Buckinghamshire Council 74 seats needed for a majority
- Turnout: 39%
	First party	Second party	Third party
Party	Conservative	Liberal Democrats	Independent
Seats before	41	4	1
Seats won	113	15	6
Seat change	▲72	▲11	▲5
Popular vote	210,010	89,427	23,434
Percentage	47.5%	20.2%	5.3%
Swing	▼5.6%	▲1.6%	▲1.8%
	Fourth party	Fifth party	Sixth party
Party	Wycombe Independents	Labour	Ind. Network
Seats before	2	1	0
Seats won	6	4	2
Seat change	▲4	▲3	▲2
Popular vote	10,206	62,827	2,826
Percentage	2.3%	14.2%	0.6%
Swing	▲0.8%	▲0.6%	▲0.6%
	Seventh party
Party	Green
Seats before	0
Seats won	1
Seat change	▲1
Popular vote	35,971
Percentage	8.1%
Swing	▲4.6%
- Map showing the results of the 2021 Buckinghamshire Council election
Council control before election
Majority administration
Conservative
Council control after election
Majority administration
Conservative

The 2021 Buckinghamshire Council election took place on 6 May 2021, alongside nationwide local elections. The election was originally due to take place in May 2020, but was postponed due to the COVID-19 pandemic.

It was the inaugural election to Buckinghamshire Council, a unitary authority created on 1 April 2020 as part of structural changes to English local government. Buckinghamshire Council replaced Buckinghamshire County Council, last elected in 2017.

A total of 147 councillors were elected, with 49 wards electing 3 councillors each. In order to secure a majority, a party needed to secure 74 seats. The Conservative Party took an overall majority with 113 seats; the Liberal Democrats came second, with 15 seats.

== Background ==
Due to the postponement of the 2020 local elections until 2021, it was announced on 18 March 2020 that all of the current shadow authority members would become councillors and the shadow executive members would form the cabinet. They remained in post until the inaugural election took place in May 2021.

== Summary ==
=== Election result ===
2021 Buckinghamshire Council election
Party	Candidates	Seats	Gains	Losses	Net gain/loss	Seats %	Votes %	Votes	+/−
Conservative	147	113	N/A	N/A	N/A	76.9	47.5	210,010	N/A
Liberal Democrats	121	15	N/A	N/A	N/A	10.2	20.2	89,427	N/A
Independent	27	6	N/A	N/A	N/A	4.1	5.3	23,434	N/A
Wycombe Independents	20	6	N/A	N/A	N/A	4.1	2.3	10,206	N/A
Labour	118	4	N/A	N/A	N/A	2.7	14.2	62,827	N/A
Ind. Network	3	2	N/A	N/A	N/A	1.4	0.6	2,826	N/A
Green	61	1	N/A	N/A	N/A	0.7	8.1	35,971	N/A
Residents	11	0	N/A	N/A	N/A	0.0	0.8	3,608	N/A
Freedom Alliance (UK)	27	0	N/A	N/A	N/A	0.0	0.5	2,287	N/A
Bucks Together	1	0	N/A	N/A	N/A	0.0	0.1	460	N/A
Reform UK	4	0	N/A	N/A	N/A	0.0	0.1	386	N/A
Women's Equality	1	0	N/A	N/A	N/A	0.0	0.1	223	N/A
TUSC	2	0	N/A	N/A	N/A	0.0	<0.1	209	N/A
Heritage	1	0	N/A	N/A	N/A	0.0	<0.1	97	N/A
UKIP	1	0	N/A	N/A	N/A	0.0	<0.1	58	N/A
SDP	1	0	N/A	N/A	N/A	0.0	<0.1	37	N/A

== Ward results ==
=== Abbey ===
To elect 3 councillors.

Abbey
Party	Candidate	Votes	%	±%
Conservative	Lesley Mary Clarke	1,494	50.8	
Conservative	Arman Alam	1,295	44.0	
Conservative	Mahboob Bhatti	1,222	41.6	
Labour	Raja Waheed Iqbal	959	32.6	
Labour	Stacey Dawn McAdam	877	29.8	
Labour	Amanda Jane Whyte	854	29.0	
Wycombe Independents	Alan Edward Hill	406	13.8	
Wycombe Independents	Madeleine Howe	289	9.8	
Wycombe Independents	Andrew Paul Smith	238	8.1	
Liberal Democrats	Daniel John Bellamy	235	8.0	
Liberal Democrats	Ron Symington	187	6.4	
Liberal Democrats	Andrew Edgar	142	4.8	
Freedom Alliance	Robert John Keen	106	3.6	
Freedom Alliance	Jack Bearfox	61	2.1	
Freedom Alliance	Sujoya Elin Mary Paul Bullock	43	1.5	
Turnout		2,965	33%	

=== Amersham & Chesham Bois ===
To elect 3 councillors.

Amersham & Chesham Bois
Party	Candidate	Votes	%	±%
Conservative	Liz Walsh	1,521	39.7	
Conservative	Graham Keith Harris	1,473	38.5	
Conservative	David William King	1,434	37.5	
Liberal Democrats	Jason Robert Keeler	1,290	33.7	
Liberal Democrats	Dominic John Pinkney	1,195	31.2	
Liberal Democrats	Mark Andrew Roberts	1,131	29.5	
Green	Cathy Baldwin	659	17.2	
Independent	Danny Buckingham	647	16.9	
Green	Fiona Jacqueline Harding	482	12.6	
Green	Annette Patricia Jepson	425	11.1	
Labour	Joceline Ruth Andrews	303	7.9	
Labour	Paul Kenneth Easton	253	6.6	
Turnout		3,860	48%	

=== Aston Clinton & Bierton ===
To elect 3 councillors.

Aston Clinton & Bierton
Party	Candidate	Votes	%	±%
Conservative	Mike Collins	1,939	49.3	
Conservative	Bill Chapple	1,860	47.3	
Conservative	Julie Elizabeth Ward	1,686	42.9	
Independent	Phil Yerby	1,410	35.9	
Labour	Martin Ian Abel	572	14.5	
Independent	Adrian John Neighbour	569	14.5	
Liberal Democrats	Geoffrey Peter Howell	562	14.3	
Green	Coral Rose Kathleen Simpson	531	13.5	
Labour	Nicky Ramsay	417	10.6	
Green	David Sullivan	381	9.7	
Green	Huseyin Caglayan	352	9.0	
Liberal Democrats	Alan Neale Sherwell	352	9.0	
Turnout		3949	38.8%	

=== Aylesbury East ===
To elect 3 councillors.

Aylesbury East
Party	Candidate	Votes	%	±%
Conservative	Mark Edward Winn	1,547	47.4	
Conservative	Richard Peter John Gaster	1,232	37.8	
Liberal Democrats	Tom Hunter-Watts	1,121	34.4	
Liberal Democrats	Mark Frederick Willis	1,102	33.8	
Conservative	Khalid Khan	1,016	31.1	
Liberal Democrats	Jeremy Hodge	810	24.8	
Residents	Paul Alan Hobbs	721	22.1	
Green	Colin Norman Bloxham	524	16.1	
Labour	Jacqui Jacques	422	12.9	
Labour	Luke Warshaw	353	10.8	
Turnout		3,275	39%	

=== Aylesbury North ===
To elect 3 councillors.

Aylesbury North
Party	Candidate	Votes	%	±%
Liberal Democrats	Tim Dixon	1,309	41.2	
Liberal Democrats	Raj Wali Khan	1,291	40.6	
Liberal Democrats	Susan Ann Morgan	1,262	39.7	
Conservative	Gillian Ann Neale-Sheppard	813	25.6	
Labour	Liz Hind	759	23.9	
Conservative	Mark Corson Roberts	718	22.6	
Conservative	Ammer Raheel	709	22.3	
Labour	Phil Jacques	565	17.8	
Labour	Dominic Jon Rothwell	413	13.0	
Green	Zack Nuttall	372	11.7	
Residents	Amy Louise Howitt	313	9.8	
TUSC	Steve Bell	109	3.4	
TUSC	Paul John Tovey	100	3.1	
Turnout		3,207	34%	

=== Aylesbury North West ===
To elect 3 councillors.

Aylesbury North West
Party	Candidate	Votes	%	±%
Liberal Democrats	Tuffail Hussain	1,174	40.1	
Liberal Democrats	Anders Carl Christensen	1,156	39.5	
Liberal Democrats	Gurinder Wadhwa	888	30.3	
Conservative	Graham Moore	708	24.2	
Conservative	John Martin Watson	671	22.9	
Conservative	Jimi Awosika	644	22.0	
Labour	Andy Blackaby-Iles	478	16.3	
Residents	Andy Huxley	452	15.4	
Labour	Michelle Pointer	442	15.1	
Residents	Neil Stephen Axe	376	12.9	
Labour	Charles Todd	349	11.9	
Residents	Gerry Bright	348	11.9	
Green	James Harry Karl Meyer-Bejol	225	7.7	
Turnout		2,933	31%	

=== Aylesbury South East ===
To elect 3 councillors.

Aylesbury South East
Party	Candidate	Votes	%	±%
Conservative	Sue Chapple	1,511	48.2	
Conservative	Denise Andree Summers	1,408	44.9	
Conservative	David Beresford Thompson	1,389	44.3	
Liberal Democrats	Richard Gordon Lloyd	917	29.3	
Liberal Democrats	Sherrilyn Anne Bateman	884	28.2	
Liberal Democrats	Chris Hendren	730	23.3	
Green	Keith Breavington	511	16.3	
Labour	Dominic Francis Jacques	476	15.2	
Labour	Phil McGoldrick	415	13.2	
Residents	Nikki Harvey	369	11.8	
Turnout		3,142	36%	

=== Aylesbury South West ===
To elect 3 councillors.

Aylesbury South West
Party	Candidate	Votes	%	±%
Liberal Democrats	Waheed Khan Raja	1,142	43.5	
Liberal Democrats	Mary Agnes Baldwin	1,063	40.5	
Liberal Democrats	Niknam Hussain	1,032	39.3	
Conservative	Sarah Sproat	622	23.7	
Conservative	Charles Anthony Adomah-Boadi	597	22.7	
Labour	Ajaz Arif	594	22.6	
Labour	Tanya Warshaw	581	22.1	
Labour	Lewis Charles Hodgetts	533	20.3	
Conservative	Asalat Khan	516	19.6	
Residents	Jason Anthony Wise	344	13.1	
Turnout		2,652	32%	

=== Aylesbury West ===
To elect 3 councillors.

Aylesbury West
Party	Candidate	Votes	%	±%
Liberal Democrats	Steven Michael Lambert	1,395	52.1	
Liberal Democrats	Sarah Jane James	1,353	50.6	
Liberal Democrats	Adam Mark Poland	1,124	42.0	
Conservative	Andrew John Cole	860	32.1	
Conservative	Sam North	605	22.6	
Conservative	Lou Redding	539	20.1	
Labour	John Bajina	384	14.4	
Labour	Chris Newton	372	13.9	
Green	Alan Cooper	360	13.5	
Residents	Judy Clarke	248	9.3	
Turnout		2,681	33%	

=== Beaconsfield ===
To elect 3 councillors.

Beaconsfield
Party	Candidate	Votes	%	±%
Conservative	Jackson Ng	1,771	50.6	
Conservative	Anita Margaret Cranmer	1,726	49.3	
Independent	Alison Jane Wheelhouse	1,620	46.3	
Conservative	Alastair John Pike	1,254	35.8	
Liberal Democrats	Paul Christopher Henry	713	20.4	
Green	Rachel Clemency Horton-Kitchlew	576	16.5	
Green	Philip William Rollinson	456	13.0	
Labour	Louise Alexandra Kavanagh	368	10.5	
Liberal Democrats	Jeff Herschel	346	9.9	
Labour	Ian Francis Tunnacliffe	241	6.9	
Turnout		3,503	42%	

=== Bernwood ===
To elect 3 councillors.

Bernwood
Party	Candidate	Votes	%	±%
Green	Gregory Mark Smith	1,880	44.5	
Conservative	Cameron Branston	1,665	39.4	
Conservative	Nic Brown	1,541	36.5	
Conservative	Brian Foster	1,533	36.3	
Green	Richard William Torpey	1,274	30.2	
Green	Johanna Wheeler	1,152	27.3	
Liberal Democrats	Jim Brown	845	20.0	
Liberal Democrats	Heather-Joy Garrett	617	14.6	
Labour	Mark Dean Brown	517	12.2	
Labour	Madeleine Smith	503	11.9	
Liberal Democrats	Stephen John Terry	324	7.7	
Labour	Andy Fenner	320	7.6	
Turnout		4,234	50%	

=== Booker, Cressex & Castlefield ===
To elect 3 councillors.

Booker, Cressex & Castlefield
Party	Candidate	Votes	%	±%
Labour	Majid Hussain	1,862	50.4	
Labour	Karen Jane Bates	1,588	43.0	
Conservative	Mohammed Ayub	1,552	42.0	
Labour	Nina Clair Dluzewska	1,475	39.9	
Conservative	Zafar Iqbal	1,310	35.5	
Conservative	Lee Wood	1,109	30.0	
Wycombe Independents	Brian Pearce	436	11.8	
Wycombe Independents	Nicky Pearson	298	8.1	
Wycombe Independents	Lionel Paul Pearce	265	7.2	
Liberal Democrats	Keith Woodrow	155	4.2	
Liberal Democrats	Jenese Joseph	143	3.9	
Liberal Democrats	Cheryl Anne Strutt	118	3.2	
Freedom Alliance	Rebecca Kate Ansell	99	2.7	
Freedom Alliance	Imran Mohammed	85	2.3	
Freedom Alliance	Daren Michael Bullock	82	2.2	
Turnout		3,724	42%	

=== Buckingham East ===
To elect 3 councillors.

Buckingham East
Party	Candidate	Votes	%	±%
Conservative	Warren Michael Whyte	1,385	50.0	
Conservative	Howard James Mordue	1,226	44.2	
Conservative	Ade Osibogun	953	34.4	
Independent	Jon Simon Harvey	564	20.4	
Labour	Robina Ahmed	494	17.8	
Labour	Michael O'Mahony	411	14.8	
Liberal Democrats	Gerald Peter Loftus	370	13.4	
Liberal Democrats	Robert Laurence Francis Brignall	364	13.1	
Green	Nicola Smith	352	12.7	
Liberal Democrats	Anja Schaefer	338	12.2	
Independent	Costas Peratopoullos	327	11.8	
Green	Kevin Bruce Robinson	313	11.3	
Green	Alex Price	301	10.9	
Labour	Anwar Ul-Haq Rashid	278	10.0	
Turnout		2,783	38%	

=== Buckingham West ===
To elect 3 councillors.

Buckingham West
Party	Candidate	Votes	%	±%
Labour	Robin Stuchbury	1,716	50.0	
Conservative	Caroline Labiba Cornell	1,545	45.0	
Conservative	Patrick Joseph Fealey	1,439	41.9	
Conservative	Simon John Strutt	1,344	39.2	
Labour	Fran Davies	750	21.9	
Labour	Ryan John William Willett	664	19.4	
Liberal Democrats	Andrew Paul Pegg	560	16.3	
Green	Cody Garland	529	15.4	
Liberal Democrats	Sam Potts	443	12.9	
Liberal Democrats	Howard Christian Osborne	391	11.4	
Turnout		3,444	39%	

=== Chalfont St Giles ===
To elect 3 councillors.

Chalfont St Giles
Party	Candidate	Votes	%	±%
Conservative	Timothy Richard Butcher	1,678	47.8	
Conservative	Carl James Jackson	1,580	45.0	
Conservative	Simon Paul Rouse	1,431	40.8	
Independent	Des Bray	791	22.5	
Green	Bob Morrison	695	19.8	
Green	Paul Aidan Waters	641	18.3	
Liberal Democrats	Toby Simon Price	594	16.9	
Green	Vicki Mistry	494	14.1	
Liberal Democrats	John Asher	411	11.7	
Liberal Democrats	Olivier Eymery	371	10.6	
Labour	Marie Fiona Collins	335	9.5	
Independent	David George Meacock	313	8.9	
Labour	Declan Paul Richard McCarthy	241	6.9	
Women's Equality	Christine Janet Child	223	6.4	
Freedom Alliance	Sam Wren	55	1.6	
Turnout		3,540	41%	

=== Chalfont St Peter ===
To elect 3 councillors.

Chalfont St Peter
Party	Candidate	Votes	%	±%
Conservative	Isobel Anne Darby	2,286	63.6	
Conservative	Linda Margaret Smith	2,017	56.2	
Conservative	Jonathan James Spencer Rush	2,013	56.0	
Liberal Democrats	Selina Mary Kerr	909	25.3	
Liberal Democrats	Bette Melling	856	23.8	
Liberal Democrats	Hilary Ruth Haworth	677	18.8	
Green	Derek Ernest Light	606	16.9	
Labour	Eileen Garrett	329	9.2	
Labour	Hector Frederick Russell Gibbs	270	7.5	
Turnout		3,621	41%	

=== Chesham ===
To elect 3 councillors.

Chesham
Party	Candidate	Votes	%	±%
Conservative	Nick Southworth	1,497	40.8	
Conservative	Qaser Chaudhry	1,383	37.7	
Conservative	Michael John Stannard	1,343	36.6	
Labour	Mohammad Zafir Bhatti	989	26.9	
Liberal Democrats	Frances Kneller	883	24.1	
Liberal Democrats	Kris Ochedowski	679	18.5	
Labour	Pat Easton	582	15.9	
Green	Alan John Gray Booth	570	15.5	
Green	Jenny Cooper	568	15.5	
Liberal Democrats	Mark Titterington	556	15.1	
Labour	Susan Procter	546	14.9	
Green	Dave Cooper	445	12.1	
Turnout		3,684	48%	

=== Chess Valley ===
To elect 3 councillors.

Chess Valley
Party	Candidate	Votes	%	±%
Conservative	Joseph Lisle Maurice Baum	1,558	40.5	
Conservative	Emily Anna Louise Culverhouse	1,461	37.9	
Conservative	Gareth David Williams	1,311	34.1	
Liberal Democrats	Roy Abraham	912	23.7	
Liberal Democrats	Parveiz Aslam	906	23.5	
Green	Justine Collette McPherson Fulford	881	22.9	
Liberal Democrats	Ruth Helen Juett	809	21.0	
Green	Gill Walker	749	19.5	
Green	Rachel Kelso	537	13.9	
Bucks Together	Deborah Wilbee	460	11.9	
Labour	Anne Louise Whitney	391	10.2	
Labour	Derek James Berry	381	9.9	
Labour	Noel Doyle	371	9.6	
Turnout		3,850	47%	

=== Chiltern Ridges ===
To elect 3 councillors.

Chiltern Ridges
Party	Candidate	Votes	%	±%
Conservative	Jane Emma MacBean	1,861	43.3	
Conservative	Patricia Mary Birchley	1,705	39.7	
Liberal Democrats	Mohammad Fayyaz	1,642	38.2	
Liberal Democrats	Alan Keith Bacon	1,604	37.3	
Conservative	Vanessa Dawn Martin	1,453	33.8	
Liberal Democrats	Paul James Frank Harding	1,281	29.8	
Green	Susanna Walder-Davis	642	14.9	
Green	Simon Charles Davenport	572	13.3	
Green	Jons Holloway	510	11.9	
Labour	Kate Mary Primus	300	7.0	
Labour	Nick Moseley	286	6.7	
Labour	Sanam Bi Shabab	240	5.6	
Turnout		4,317	50%	

=== Chiltern Villages ===
To elect 3 councillors.

Chiltern Villages
Party	Candidate	Votes	%	±%
Conservative	Dominic Heaton Goodall Barnes	2,287	67.3	
Conservative	Mark Lawson Turner	2,061	60.7	
Conservative	Zahir Mohammed	1,790	52.7	
Liberal Democrats	Tony Hill	863	25.4	
Labour	David Frank Riddington	548	16.1	
Labour	Mariam Azam	541	15.9	
Liberal Democrats	Richard Mitton Taylor	536	15.8	
Labour	Nicholas Helweg-Larsen	485	14.3	
Freedom Alliance	Peter Stephen Buckfield	130	3.8	
Turnout		3,407	38%	

=== Cliveden ===
To elect 3 councillors.

Cliveden
Party	Candidate	Votes	%	±%
Conservative	Kirsten Ashman	1,480	56.1	
Conservative	Paul James Kelly	1,352	51.3	
Conservative	George Edward Summerton Sandy	1,317	49.9	
Green	Zoe Hatch	1,099	41.7	
Labour	Ciaran Louis Ferguson	678	25.7	
Labour	Chris Tucker	610	23.1	
Turnout		2,646	33%	

=== Denham ===
To elect 3 councillors.

Denham
Party	Candidate	Votes	%	±%
Conservative	Guy Frederick Hollis	1,354	54.4	
Conservative	Paul William Bass	1,308	52.6	
Conservative	Santokh Singh Chhokar	1,125	45.2	
Independent	Roger William Reed	586	23.6	
Independent	Barry James Harding	551	22.2	
Green	Rob Smith	515	20.7	
Green	Cathy Bosshardt	469	18.9	
Labour	Adam Richard Eveleigh	370	14.9	
Labour	Alex Thornton	331	13.3	
Turnout		2,500	33%	

=== Downley ===
To elect 3 councillors.

Downley
Party	Candidate	Votes	%	±%
Conservative	Paul Richard Turner	1,602	46.6	
Conservative	Maz Hussain	1,520	44.3	
Labour	Melanie Ruth Smith	1,390	40.5	
Labour	Khalil Ahmed	1,362	39.7	
Conservative	Duncan Rayner Smith	1,283	37.4	
Labour	Trevor Snaith	1,127	32.8	
Liberal Democrats	Matthew Stuart Brown	250	7.3	
Liberal Democrats	Alison May Harmsworth	226	6.6	
Wycombe Independents	Victoria Reid	190	5.5	
Wycombe Independents	Tony Mealing	149	4.3	
Liberal Democrats	Gerald Harmsworth	141	4.1	
Wycombe Independents	Mohammad Fogir Uddin	99	2.9	
Freedom Alliance	Adrian John Oliver	97	2.8	
Freedom Alliance	Marcin Blaszczyk	79	2.3	
UKIP	Vijay Singh Srao	58	1.7	
Turnout		3,454	40%	

=== Farnham Common & Burnham Beeches ===
To elect 3 councillors.

Farnham Common & Burnham Beeches
Party	Candidate	Votes	%	±%
Conservative	David Gwilym Anthony	1,421	54.3	
Conservative	Dev Dhillon	1,384	52.9	
Conservative	Nick Naylor	1,372	52.4	
Liberal Democrats	David Harry Duncan Banks	885	33.8	
Liberal Democrats	Carol Lesley Linton	819	31.3	
Liberal Democrats	Davina Joy Kirby	554	21.2	
Labour	Alexa Anne Collins	386	14.7	
Labour	Andrew Miles Ford	292	11.2	
Reform UK	Delphine Gray-Fisk	99	3.8	
Turnout		2,623	36%	

=== Flackwell Health, Little Marlow & Marlow South East ===
To elect 3 councillors.

Flackwell Health, Little Marlow & Marlow South East
Party	Candidate	Votes	%	±%
Conservative	David Alan Johncock	1,764	59.6	
Conservative	Jocelyn Towns	1,543	52.2	
Conservative	David Martyn Watson	1,530	51.7	
Green	Joanne Elizabeth Fielding	709	24.0	
Green	Jamie Kingston	547	18.5	
Liberal Democrats	Anthony Robin McGarel-Groves	426	14.4	
Labour	Katherine Murphy	396	13.4	
Liberal Democrats	Chris Tolmie	384	13.0	
Labour	Trevor Stuart Southern	206	7.0	
Reform UK	Angela Patricia Stone	134	4.5	
Freedom Alliance	Kate Casmira Mills	113	3.8	
Freedom Alliance	Julie Sara Pleass	105	3.5	
Turnout		2,969	35%	

=== Gerrards Cross ===
To elect 3 councillors.

Gerrards Cross
Party	Candidate	Votes	%	±%
Conservative	Andrew Alexander Wood	1,844	67.4	
Conservative	Thomas Edward Dudley Broom	1,797	65.7	
Conservative	Michael William Robert Bracken	1,727	63.1	
Liberal Democrats	Julian Andrew Ingram	725	26.5	
Liberal Democrats	Diane Margaret Holden	688	25.1	
Labour	Molly Eileen Fowler	460	16.8	
Labour	Michael Anthony Kavanagh	318	11.6	
Turnout		2,761	39%	

=== Great Brickhill ===
To elect 3 councillors.

Great Brickhill
Party	Candidate	Votes	%	±%
Conservative	Phil Gomm	1,889	46.7	
Conservative	Jilly Jordan	1,786	44.1	
Conservative	Iain Hugh Macpherson	1,664	41.1	
Liberal Democrats	Andrew Simon Jones	1,384	34.2	
Liberal Democrats	Malcolm Cameron Newing	1,280	31.6	
Liberal Democrats	Nicolette Smith	1,172	28.9	
Green	Bob Eastoe	812	20.1	
Labour	Maxine Myatt	551	13.6	
Labour	Hans Copas	433	10.7	
Turnout		4,099	43%	

=== Great Missenden ===
To elect 3 councillors.

Great Missenden
Party	Candidate	Votes	%	±%
Conservative	Mimi Harker	1,860	54.1	
Conservative	Peter Ernest Charles Martin	1,745	50.8	
Conservative	Heather Maree Wallace	1,707	49.7	
Green	Catherine Bunting	1,038	30.2	
Liberal Democrats	Declan Augustine Mullen	931	27.1	
Liberal Democrats	Christopher Hendrik Spruytenburg	614	17.9	
Liberal Democrats	Simon John Morgan Woodhead	545	15.9	
Labour	Sam Howells	421	12.2	
Labour	Josh Westerling	359	10.4	
Freedom Alliance	Collette Denise Moy	106	3.1	
Turnout		3,457	43%	

=== Grendon Underwood ===
To elect 3 councillors.

Grendon Underwood
Party	Candidate	Votes	%	±%
Conservative	Angela Ria Joyce Macpherson	2,152	58.5	
Conservative	Frank Mahon	1,882	51.2	
Conservative	Michael John Rand	1,767	48.0	
Green	Clare Elisabeth Butler	864	23.5	
Labour	Phil Gibbs	649	17.6	
Independent	Rachel Ann Ambrose	564	15.3	
Liberal Democrats	Sarah Ruth Jeffreys	469	12.7	
Labour	Karen Susan Rakowska	463	12.6	
Liberal Democrats	Ivo Jacobus Haest	408	11.1	
Independent	David John Dilly	404	11.0	
Liberal Democrats	Julius Sebastian Macefield Parker	253	6.9	
Turnout		3,682	42%	

=== Hazlemere ===
To elect 3 councillors.

Hazlemere
Party	Candidate	Votes	%	±%
Conservative	Catherine Joan Oliver	1,624	60.0	
Independent	Ed Gemmell	1,380	51.0	
Conservative	Ron Gaffney	1,373	50.7	
Conservative	Peter Anthony Tichbon	1,156	42.7	
Liberal Democrats	Felicity Mary Hazelgreen	371	13.7	
Labour	Adam James Coulthard	354	13.1	
Labour	Christopher John Mooney	314	11.6	
Labour	Fizza Bibi Shah	298	11.0	
Liberal Democrats	Derek Clarke	256	9.5	
Freedom Alliance	Daniel Mark Charlton	124	4.6	
Turnout		2,720	36%	

=== Iver ===
To elect 3 councillors.

Iver
Party	Candidate	Votes	%	±%
Independent	Paul James Griffin	1,437	50.7	
Conservative	Wendy Allison Matthews	1,225	43.2	
Conservative	Luisa Katherine Sullivan	1,052	37.1	
Conservative	Malcolm James Bradford	1,051	37.1	
Green	Leigh Martin Tugwood	871	30.7	
Labour	Alison Duncan Watt	539	19.0	
Labour	Azhar Iqbal Chohan	464	16.4	
Turnout		2,853	34%	

=== Ivinghoe ===
To elect 3 councillors.

Ivinghoe
Party	Candidate	Votes	%	±%
Conservative	Peter Charles Brazier	1,834	66.1	
Conservative	Chris Poll	1,805	65.1	
Conservative	Derek Town	1,727	62.3	
Labour	Trish Owen	903	32.6	
Green	Mark Wheeler	793	28.6	
Labour	Catherine Teresa Hayden	710	25.6	
Labour	Clive Cohen	647	23.3	
Liberal Democrats	Daisy Elizabeth Clark	509	18.4	
Liberal Democrats	Dilruwan Chaminda Herath	506	18.2	
Liberal Democrats	Alon Josefsberg	485	17.5	
Turnout		2,785	32%	

=== Little Chalfont & Amersham Common ===
To elect 3 councillors.

Little Chalfont & Amersham Common
Party	Candidate	Votes	%	±%
Conservative	Martin Anthony Tett	1,845	53.2	
Conservative	Caroline Marzilla Jones	1,719	49.5	
Conservative	Rachael Sara Matthews	1,478	42.6	
Liberal Democrats	Howard Maitland-Jones	954	27.5	
Liberal Democrats	Anna Rebecca Losse	800	23.0	
Liberal Democrats	Paula Hilary Marzouk	660	19.0	
Green	Toby Jarvis Adams	495	14.3	
Labour	Laura Elizabeth Kyrke-Smith	448	12.9	
Green	Peter John Dodsworth	438	12.6	
Labour	Ranganath Raghavendra Mirji	413	11.9	
Green	Douglas Ian Silverstone	385	11.1	
Turnout		3,490	43%	

=== Marlow ===
To elect 3 councillors.

Marlow
Party	Candidate	Votes	%	±%
Conservative	Alex Collingwood	2,063	53.6	
Conservative	Carol Fay Heap	1,795	46.7	
Conservative	Neil Bennett Marshall	1,624	42.2	
Liberal Democrats	Paul Michael Anthony Burden	1,136	29.5	
Liberal Democrats	Anna Victoria Crabtree	1,040	27.0	
Independent	Mark Andrew Skoyles	878	22.8	
Green	Lizzie Owen	597	15.5	
Green	Mark Richard Hartley	483	12.6	
Green	Aidan Lawrence Carlisle	425	11.0	
Labour	Fionnuala Catherine Woods	307	8.0	
Labour	Keith Anthony Wishart	245	6.4	
Freedom Alliance	Sarah Elizabeth Weavers	91	2.4	
Reform UK	Bettina Joy Harries	81	2.1	
Turnout		3,867	45%	

=== Penn Wood & Old Amersham ===
To elect 3 councillors.

Penn Wood & Old Amersham
Party	Candidate	Votes	%	±%
Conservative	Mark Christopher Dormer	2,212	61.3	
Conservative	Mark Flys	2,112	58.5	
Conservative	Jonathan David Hammond Waters	1,882	52.1	
Liberal Democrats	Jane Louise Barnes	938	26.0	
Liberal Democrats	Emer Michael O'Kelly	902	25.0	
Green	Jack Gocher	834	23.1	
Liberal Democrats	Kingsley Walter Juett	720	19.9	
Labour	Heather Florence Pomroy	348	9.6	
Labour	Keith Patrick Simons	242	6.7	
Freedom Alliance	David Leonard Coombes	89	2.5	
Turnout		3,627	42%	

=== Ridgeway East ===
To elect 3 councillors.

Ridgeway East
Party	Candidate	Votes	%	±%
Conservative	David James Carroll	2,376	67.7	
Conservative	Steven Broadbent	2,369	67.5	
Conservative	Clive Burke Harriss	2,013	57.4	
Liberal Democrats	Steven Kennell	1,026	29.2	
Independent	Linda Mary Ruth Derrick	677	19.3	
Labour	Nick Lyon	576	16.4	
Labour	Aris Galinos Pollatos	473	13.5	
Freedom Alliance	Ignazio Dentici	91	2.6	
Turnout		3,524	41%	

=== Ridgeway West ===
To elect 3 councillors.

Ridgeway West
Party	Candidate	Votes	%	±%
Conservative	Robert Peter Flavio Carington	2,017	60.7	
Conservative	Carl Alexander Arvid Etholen	1,887	56.8	
Conservative	Shade Adoh	1,828	55.0	
Liberal Democrats	Eileen Margaret Rowlands	899	27.1	
Liberal Democrats	Jane Georgiana Rampin	890	26.8	
Liberal Democrats	Candy Piercy	831	25.0	
Labour	Andrew Stuart Douglas	342	10.3	
Labour	Stephen Greiff	304	9.2	
Freedom Alliance	Charly Kirby	102	3.1	
Turnout		3,354	42%	

=== Ryemead & Micklefield ===
To elect 3 councillors.

Ryemead & Micklefield
Party	Candidate	Votes	%	±%
Wycombe Independents	Matt Knight	1,051	37.8	
Wycombe Independents	Andrea Claire Baughan	976	35.1	
Wycombe Independents	Nabeela Naheed Rana	870	31.3	
Liberal Democrats	Ian Douglas Morton	731	26.3	
Conservative	Ian McEnnis	587	21.1	
Liberal Democrats	Xocoa Sharma	562	20.2	
Liberal Democrats	Mohammed Faraque Yasin	557	20.0	
Labour	Isobel Marie Craddock	539	19.4	
Conservative	Chris Miller	529	19.0	
Labour	Riaz Ahmed	500	18.0	
Labour	Muhammad Mujtaba Hashmi	446	16.0	
Conservative	Harpinder Singh Walia	374	13.5	
Freedom Alliance	James Allen Ansell	58	2.1	
Turnout		2,790	35%	

=== Stoke Poges & Wexham ===
To elect 3 councillors.

Stoke Poges & Wexham
Party	Candidate	Votes	%	±%
Conservative	Ralph Bagge	1,712	58.9	
Conservative	Trevor Frank Egleton	1,656	57.0	
Conservative	Thomas Neil Hogg	1,317	45.3	
Independent	Seema Kumari Flower	623	21.4	
Green	Michael Christopher McCarthy	575	19.8	
Labour	Lindsey Alice Poole	469	16.1	
Labour	David Alan Norris	468	16.1	
Liberal Democrats	Denise Anne Herschel	403	13.9	
Liberal Democrats	Christopher Francis Woolley	324	11.1	
Turnout		2,928	37%	

=== Stone & Waddesdon ===
To elect 3 councillors.

Stone & Waddesdon
Party	Candidate	Votes	%	±%
Conservative	Paul Irwin	1,826	51.9	
Conservative	Ashley Waite	1,692	48.1	
Conservative	Mike Caffrey	1,515	43.1	
Labour	Chris Beatty	653	18.6	
Labour	Elaine Marie Conway	651	18.5	
Labour	Katie Owens	613	17.4	
Green	Doug Kennedy	477	13.6	
Green	Matthew James Williams	457	13.0	
Liberal Democrats	Lucy Williams	352	10.0	
Green	Peter Geoffrey Rhoades	347	9.9	
Liberal Democrats	Jason Samuel Bingley	344	9.8	
Independent	Keith Ralph Brindle	339	9.6	
Residents	Gary Richard Good	321	9.1	
Liberal Democrats	Ashley Richard Morgan	302	8.6	
SDP	Paul David Tinay	37	1.1	
Turnout		3,525	33%	

=== Terriers & Amersham Hill ===
To elect 3 councillors.

Terriers & Amersham Hill
Party	Candidate	Votes	%	±%
Conservative	Tony Green	1,133	39.3	
Conservative	Arif Hussain	1,005	34.8	
Conservative	Sarfaraz Khan Raja	958	33.2	
Liberal Democrats	Ryan James Wilson	790	27.4	
Liberal Democrats	Tamsin Nicola Holkham	731	25.3	
Labour	Alex Down	672	23.3	
Liberal Democrats	Christopher David Walden	655	22.7	
Labour	Angela Jane Hart	653	22.6	
Labour	Karl Albert Newton	617	21.4	
Wycombe Independents	Rebecca Bennett	372	12.9	
Wycombe Independents	Haroon Arshad	234	8.1	
Wycombe Independents	Inam Ullah Khan	200	6.9	
Reform UK	Richard Neal Phoenix	72	2.5	
Freedom Alliance	Sowande Olushegun Mongo Snagg	38	1.3	
Turnout		2,898	35%	

=== The Risboroughs ===
To elect 3 councillors.

The Risboroughs
Party	Candidate	Votes	%	±%
Conservative	Gary Hall	1,663	51.9	
Conservative	Alan Harold Turner	1,548	48.3	
Conservative	Matthew Walsh	1,418	44.2	
Independent	Andy Ball	1,233	38.5	
Independent	Ian Michael Parkinson	775	24.2	
Liberal Democrats	Matthew Christopher Hudson	521	16.3	
Independent	Alan James Frost	510	15.9	
Labour	Hannah Hulme Hunter	509	15.9	
Labour	Brian Huw Gammage	417	13.0	
Freedom Alliance	David Anthony Blake	86	2.7	
Freedom Alliance	Jamie Wood	63	2.0	
Turnout		3,225	40%	

=== The Wooburns, Bourne End & Hedsor ===
To elect 3 councillors.

The Wooburns, Bourne End & Hedsor
Party	Candidate	Votes	%	±%
Independent	Penny Drayton	1,880	54.6	
Independent	Stuart Paul Wilson	1,723	50.0	
Independent	Sophie Anne Kayani	1,682	48.8	
Conservative	Julia Adelaide Adey	1,240	36.0	
Conservative	Julia Diane Langley	1,124	32.6	
Conservative	Graham Featherstone Peart	854	24.8	
Green	Louise Carron Harris	364	10.6	
Green	Amanda Valentine	284	8.2	
Labour	Shona Margaret Collins-Staig	274	8.0	
Labour	Harinder Kaur Tiwana	233	6.8	
Independent	Andrew Cobden	77	2.2	
Freedom Alliance	Jacs Parker	44	1.3	
Turnout		3,455	40%	

=== Totteridge & Bowerdean ===
To elect 3 councillors.

Totteridge & Bowerdean
Party	Candidate	Votes	%	±%
Wycombe Independents	Julia Denise Wassell	1,255	39.0	
Wycombe Independents	Imran Hussain	1,129	35.1	
Wycombe Independents	Steve Guy	1,009	31.3	
Liberal Democrats	Anwar Rashid	957	29.7	
Liberal Democrats	Chaudhry Ansar Mahmood	915	28.4	
Liberal Democrats	Ben James Holkham	901	28.0	
Labour	Rafiq Mohammed Raja	714	22.2	
Labour	Ian Stephen Bates	593	18.4	
Labour	Philippa Eryl Young	541	16.8	
Conservative	Matthew Owen Plested	490	15.2	
Conservative	Alexander Stephen Cobb	426	13.2	
Conservative	Hasan Ali Arif	404	12.6	
Turnout		3,327	35%	

=== Tylers Green & Loudwater ===
To elect 3 councillors.

Tylers Green & Loudwater
Party	Candidate	Votes	%	±%
Conservative	Katrina Suzanne Atkins Wood	1,316	46.9	
Conservative	Steven Barrett	1,261	45.0	
Conservative	Nathan Andrew Thomas	1,035	36.9	
Independent	Peter John Cartwright	885	31.6	
Liberal Democrats	Ian Forbes	640	22.8	
Liberal Democrats	Paula Louise Lee	562	20.0	
Wycombe Ind.	Rowena Croft	478	17.0	
Labour	Raheel Khan	407	14.5	
Labour	Wasif Rasheed	339	12.1	
Wycombe Ind.	Antonio Collinao Pizarro	264	9.4	
Freedom Alliance	Anita Lawrynowicz	75	2.7	
Turnout		2,824	33%	

=== Wendover, Halton & Stoke Mandeville ===
To elect 3 councillors.

Wendover, Halton & Stoke Mandeville
Party	Candidate	Votes	%	±%
Conservative	Steve Bowles	1,572	48.2	
Conservative	Peter Derek Strachan	1,426	43.7	
Conservative	Richard Allan Newcombe	1,200	36.8	
Independent	Tom Walsh	989	30.3	
Green	Tom Peter Hodge	676	20.7	
Liberal Democrats	Clive Edward John Gallagher	605	18.5	
Green	Joanne Hodge	580	17.8	
Labour	David John Lander	539	16.5	
Liberal Democrats	Fran Dixon	416	12.7	
Labour	James North Pyper	360	11.0	
Green	Greg Smith	356	10.9	
Residents	Kris Kerley	187	5.7	
Freedom Alliance	Julie Josephine Williams	115	3.5	
Turnout		3,277	38%	

=== West Wycombe ===
To elect 3 councillors.

West Wycombe
Party	Candidate	Votes	%	±%
Ind. Network	Darren John Hayday	1,211	40.7	
Conservative	Marcus Angell	882	29.6	
Ind. Network	Orsolya Hayday	876	29.4	
Conservative	Zia Ahmed	822	27.6	
Conservative	Tom Pike	758	25.5	
Ind. Network	Neil Nicholson Watson	739	24.8	
Labour	Amber Elizabeth China	701	23.6	
Labour	Muddasar Iqbal	684	23.0	
Labour	Ghulam Rabani	668	22.4	
Liberal Democrats	Nick Hodder	374	12.6	
Liberal Democrats	Lynda Jean Titchen Moorcroft	289	9.7	
Liberal Democrats	Neil Christopher Timberlake	276	9.3	
Freedom Alliance	Susan Ing-Simmons	60	2.0	
Turnout		2,982	39%	

=== Wing ===
To elect 3 councillors.

Wing
Party	Candidate	Votes	%	±%
Conservative	Ashley Graham Bond	1,637	44.9	
Conservative	Diana Blamires	1,465	40.2	
Liberal Democrats	Peter Aiden Cooper	1,445	39.6	
Conservative	Justin Farrington-Smith	1,274	34.9	
Liberal Democrats	Sanchia Davidson	1,170	32.1	
Liberal Democrats	Poonam Kant Gupta	1,115	30.6	
Green	Janet Mary Pentony	622	17.1	
Labour	Alexandria Jane Rakowska	433	11.9	
Labour	Ian Andrew Wells	378	10.4	
Residents	Louise Mary Howitt	273	7.5	
Freedom Alliance	Georgina Lesley Heyburn	90	2.5	
Turnout		3,654	40%	

=== Winslow ===
To elect 3 councillors.

Winslow
Party	Candidate	Votes	%	±%
Conservative	John Robert Chilver	1,645	49.1	
Conservative	David Philip Goss	1,595	47.6	
Conservative	Beville Douglas Stanier	1,311	39.1	
Liberal Democrats	Llew Monger	1,309	39.1	
Liberal Democrats	Trish Cawte	1,143	34.1	
Liberal Democrats	Roger Slevin	898	26.8	
Green	Mary Hunt	654	19.5	
Labour	Timothy Richard Pain	367	10.9	
Labour	Robert Stuart Lang	287	8.6	
Heritage	Dominic Kinnaird	97	2.9	
Turnout		3,362	42%	

== By-elections ==
=== Bernwood ===
A by-election was held on 30 June 2022 following the resignation of Cllr Cameron Branston.

Bernwood: 30 June 2022
Party	Candidate	Votes	%	±%
Liberal Democrats	Sue Lewin	1,158	38.7	+18.7
Green	Richard Torpey	1,030	34.4	+4.2
Conservative	David Leonard Hughes	723	24.1	−15.3
Labour	Lindsey Alice Poole	85	2.8	−9.4
Majority		128	4.3	N/A
Turnout		3,000	35	−15
Registered electors		8,647		
Liberal Democrats gain from Conservative				

=== Denham ===
A by-election was held following the resignation of Cllr Paul Bass.

Denham: 27 July 2023
Party	Candidate	Votes	%	±%
Conservative	Jaspal Singh Chhokar	848	42.2	–10.4
Liberal Democrats	Julie Cook	634	31.5	N/A
Independent	Barry Harding	404	20.1	–2.1
Labour	Nadeem Siddiqui	125	6.2	–8.7
Majority		214	10.7	−19.7
Turnout		2,017	26.7	−6.3
Registered electors		7,551		
Conservative hold				

=== Buckingham East ===
The Buckingham East by-election was triggered by the resignation of Conservative councillor Warren Whyte.

Buckingham East: 2 November 2023
Party	Candidate	Votes	%	±%
Liberal Democrats	Anja Schaefer	690	39.8	+27.6
Conservative	Jane Mordue	593	34.2	−15.8
Labour	Fran Davies	371	21.4	+3.6
Green	Michael Culverhouse	81	4.6	−8.1
Majority		97	5.6	N/A
Turnout		1,745	23	−15
Registered electors		7,503		
Liberal Democrats gain from Conservative				

=== Farnham Common and Burnham Beeches ===
A by-election was held on 22 February 2024 following the resignation of Cllr David Anthony.

Farnham Common and Burnham Beeches: 22 February 2024
Party	Candidate	Votes	%	±%
Conservative	David Moore	860	51.8	−2.5
Liberal Democrats	Carol Linton	689	41.5	+10.2
Labour	Alexa Collins	111	6.7	−8.0
Majority		171	10.3	
Turnout		1,660	23.2	−12.8
Registered electors		7,160		
Conservative hold				

=== Hazlemere ===
A by-election was held on 22 February 2024 following the death of Cllr Ron Gaffney.

Hazlemere: 22 February 2024
Party	Candidate	Votes	%	±%
Conservative	Steven Roy	687	36.5	−14.2
Independent	Leigh Casey	654	34.8	N/A
Liberal Democrats	Mark Titterington	426	22.7	+9.0
Labour	Adam Dale	113	6.0	−7.1
Majority		33	1.7	
Turnout		1,880	25.7	−10.3
Registered electors		7,325		
Conservative hold				
