= 2015 South Bucks District Council election =

Local election in England

Map of the results

The 2015 South Bucks District Council election took place on 7 May 2015 to elect members to the South Bucks District Council in England. This was on the same day as other local elections.
