= South Bucks =

Former non-metropolitan district in England

Coordinates: 51°34′35″N 0°38′20″W

South Bucks District
- Non-metropolitan district
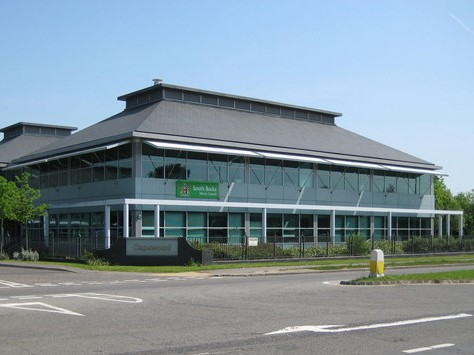
- Capswood, Oxford Road, Denham: South Bucks District Council headquarters 2004-2020.

- South Bucks shown within Buckinghamshire
- Sovereign state: United Kingdom
- Constituent country: England
- Region: South East England
- Non-metropolitan county: Buckinghamshire
- Status: Non-metropolitan district
- Admin HQ: Denham
- Incorporated: 1 April 1974

Government
  - Type: Non-metropolitan district council
  - Body: South Bucks District Council
  - Leadership: Leader & Cabinet

Area
  - Total: 54.55 sq mi (141.28 km^{2})

Population (2025)
  - Total: 70,212
  - Density: 1,287.1/sq mi (496.97/km^{2})
  - Ethnicity: 89.3% White; 6.0% S.Asian; 1.6% Black; 1.4% Chinese or Other; 1.7% Mixed Race
- Time zone: UTC0 (GMT)
  - Summer (DST): UTC+1 (BST)
- ONS code: 11UE (ONS); E07000006 (GSS)
- OS grid reference: TQ0486
- Website: www.southbucks.gov.uk

South Bucks was one of four local government districts in the non-metropolitan county of Buckinghamshire, in South East England.

The district was formed on 1 April 1974 by the Local Government Act 1972, by the amalgamation of the area of Beaconsfield Urban District with part of Eton Rural District. The district was originally named Beaconsfield; it was renamed to South Bucks on 1 April 1980, following the passing of a resolution by the district council. The name was formally 'South Bucks' rather than 'South Buckinghamshire'. The district was abolished on 31 March 2020 and its area is now administered by the unitary Buckinghamshire Council.

See List of civil parishes in South Bucks.

South Bucks District Council

Type
- Type: Non-Metropolitan District

Leadership
- Leader of the Council: Nick Naylor, Conservative
- Deputy Leader of the Council: John Read, Conservative

Structure
- Seats: 28 councillors
- Political groups: Administration Conservative (26) Other parties Independent (2)
- Length of term: 4 years

Elections
- Last election: 7 May 2015
- Next election: 7 May 2021 (as part of Buckinghamshire Council)

Website
- www.southbucks.gov.uk

== Transport ==
A large part of the district was sandwiched between the M40 and M4 motorways, both of which had junctions within the district. The major M40/M25 interchange is located near Gerrards Cross and is the M25's only junction in the district. South Bucks contained the greatest length of motorway in any Buckinghamshire district. Railway lines follow the motorways: they were the Great Western Main Line and the Chiltern Main Line, with important stations in Beaconsfield and Gerrards Cross. Denham Aerodrome in the southeast of the district had a small number of chartered flights running out of it.

== Premises ==
From its creation in 1974 until 2004 the council was based at the former Eton Rural District Council's offices on Windsor Road in Slough, outside the district's administrative area. In 2004 the council moved to a modern office building at Capswood, Oxford Road, Denham, within its administrative area. Since the local government reorganisation in 2020, the building at Capswood briefly served as one of the area offices of Buckinghamshire Council before being closed.

== Education ==
The Japanese international boarding school Teikyo School United Kingdom is located in Wexham, South Bucks.

The former district was also home to comprehensive Beaconsfield School as well as the grammar schools, Beaconsfield High School and Burnham Grammar School.
