= Grade II* listed buildings in Aylesbury Vale =

There are over 20,000 Grade II* listed buildings in England. This page is a list of these buildings in the Aylesbury Vale in Buckinghamshire.

== List of buildings ==
Name	Location	Type	Completed (Note: The date given is the date used by Historic England as significant for the initial building or that of an important part in the structure's description.)	Date designated	Grid ref. (Note: The grid reference is based on the British national grid reference system, sometimes known as OSGB36, used by the Ordnance Survey.) Geo-coordinates	Entry number (Note: The "List Entry Number" is a unique number assigned to each listed building and scheduled monument by Historic England.)	Image
Church of St Mary	Addington	Church	14th century	13 July 1966	SP7426128492; 51°57′00″N 0°55′15″W	1214530	Church of St Mary More images
Church of St James	Aston Abbotts	Church	Late 15th–early 16th century	18 October 1966	SP8473920239; 51°52′27″N 0°46′14″W	1116023	Church of St James More images
Church of St Michael and All Angels	Aston Clinton	Church	13th century	21 December 1967	SP8793111948; 51°47′57″N 0°43′35″W	1124228	Church of St Michael and All Angels More images
Parish Church of St Michael	Aston Sandford	Church	13th century	21 December 1967	SP7564507876; 51°45′52″N 0°54′19″W	1118340	Parish Church of St Michael More images
Ceely House	Aylesbury	House	Early 18th century	7 April 1952	SP8177413846; 51°49′02″N 0°48′54″W	1160059	Ceely House More images
Greenend House	Aylesbury	House	Late 18th century	7 April 1952	SP8176513705; 51°48′58″N 0°48′55″W	1117950	Upload Photo
Prebendal House School	Aylesbury	Clergy house	18th century	7 April 1952	SP8165913882; 51°49′03″N 0°49′00″W	1117941	Upload Photo
The County Hall, including the former Town Hall, the former County Constabulary Headquarters and the Judge's Lodgings	Aylesbury	County hall	1722–40	7 April 1952	SP8198613675; 51°48′57″N 0°48′43″W	1117935	The County Hall, including the former Town Hall, the former County Constabulary Headquarters and the Judge's Lodgings More images
The Derby Arms Public House	Aylesbury	Former public house	18th century	7 April 1952	SP8173313949; 51°49′06″N 0°48′56″W	1319191	The Derby Arms Public House More images
The Kings Head Hotel	Aylesbury	Public house	15th–16th century	7 April 1952	SP8188413773; 51°49′00″N 0°48′49″W	1160205	The Kings Head Hotel More images
The Museum	Aylesbury	Grammar school	1719	7 April 1952	SP8176413861; 51°49′03″N 0°48′55″W	1117970	The Museum More images
26 Temple Street	Aylesbury	House	17th century	7 April 1952	SP8182313763; 51°48′59″N 0°48′52″W	1310418	26 Temple Street
28 Temple Street	Aylesbury	House	Early 18th century	7 April 1952	SP8181913769; 51°49′00″N 0°48′52″W	1117925	28 Temple Street
1 Church Street	Aylesbury	House	1739	7 April 1952	SP8180313809; 51°49′01″N 0°48′53″W	1117968	Upload Photo
10 Church Street	Aylesbury	House	15th century or 16th century	7 April 1952	SP8174313837; 51°49′02″N 0°48′56″W	1160097	10 Church Street More images
Church of St Mary	Beachampton	Church	14th century	13 July 1966	SP7705337069; 52°01′36″N 0°52′42″W	1288408	Church of St Mary More images
Hall Farmhouse	Beachampton	Country house	Late 15th century	25 September 1951	SP7705237356; 52°01′45″N 0°52′42″W	1214834	Upload Photo
Biddlesden Park House	Biddlesden	Country house	1731	25 September 1951	SP6324339902; 52°03′14″N 1°04′45″W	1211458	Upload Photo
Church of St Margaret and linking wing to Biddlesden Park House	Biddlesden	Chapel	1735	13 July 1966	SP6329539862; 52°03′13″N 1°04′42″W	1211493	Upload Photo
Barn at New Manor Farm	Broughton, Bierton with Broughton	Aisled barn	c.1174	25 October 1951	SP8456413728; 51°48′57″N 0°46′29″W	1310584	Upload Photo
Church of St James	Boarstall	Church	1818	21 December 1967	SP6248214164; 51°49′21″N 1°05′41″W	1124282	Church of St James More images
Church of All Saints	Brill	Church	12th century	21 December 1967	SP6562813854; 51°49′10″N 1°02′57″W	1124287	Church of All Saints More images
Flats, the Manor House	Brill	House	Early 17th century	25 October 1951	SP6533013718; 51°49′06″N 1°03′13″W	1332781	Upload Photo
Brill Windmill	Brill	Windmill	Late 17th century	25 October 1951	SP6519814146; 51°49′20″N 1°03′20″W	1124265	Brill Windmill More images
Old Latin School	Buckingham	School	Late 18th century	13 October 1952	SP6957234024; 52°00′01″N 0°59′17″W	1201391	Old Latin School More images
Old Town Hall	Buckingham	Town hall	1748	13 October 1952	SP6956933960; 51°59′59″N 0°59′17″W	1282685	Old Town Hall More images
The Manor House, Twisted Chimneys	Buckingham	Clergy house	Early 16th century	13 October 1952	SP6942333631; 51°59′48″N 0°59′25″W	1282715	The Manor House, Twisted Chimneys More images
The Old Gaol	Buckingham	Former gaol	1748	13 October 1952	SP6967534092; 52°00′03″N 0°59′11″W	1201392	The Old Gaol More images
The Vicarage	Buckingham	Open hall house	c.1445	3 April 1973	SP6943033652; 51°59′49″N 0°59′25″W	1282716	The Vicarage
Trinity House	Buckingham	House	16th century	13 October 1952	SP6943133670; 51°59′50″N 0°59′24″W	1201373	Trinity House More images
Trolly Hall	Buckingham	House	1670	13 October 1952	SP6953233888; 51°59′57″N 0°59′19″W	1204476	Trolly Hall
29 and 30 West Street	Buckingham	Town house	Early 19th century	3 April 1973	SP6954433984; 52°00′00″N 0°59′18″W	1201425	29 and 30 West Street
Church of All Saints	Buckland	Church	13th–19th century	21 December 1967	SP8879012446; 51°48′13″N 0°42′49″W	1160591	Church of All Saints More images
Parish Church of St Nicholas	Chearsley	Church	12th century	21 December 1967	SP7202510313; 51°47′13″N 0°57′26″W	1118344	Parish Church of St Nicholas More images
Church of St Giles	Cheddington	Church	12th century	18 October 1966	SP9222118007; 51°51′11″N 0°39′45″W	1310457	Church of St Giles More images
Chilton House including forecourt walls, gates, railings and pavilions (Clock Tower)	Chilton	House	c.1740	25 October 1951	SP6872911624; 51°47′57″N 1°00′17″W	1118316	Chilton House including forecourt walls, gates, railings and pavilions (Clock Tower) More images
The Gatehouse	Chilton	House	1683	26 October 1951	SP6883611558; 51°47′54″N 1°00′12″W	1118320	The Gatehouse
Chapel at Manor House	Creslow	Chapel	13th–14th century	25 October 1951	SP8110621867; 51°53′22″N 0°49′22″W	1034375	Chapel at Manor House More images
Church of St Nicholas	Cublington	Church	Early 15th century	18 October 1966	SP8387622202; 51°53′31″N 0°46′57″W	1320123	Church of St Nicholas More images
Parish Church of St Nicholas	Cuddington	Church	13th century	21 December 1967	SP7373711209; 51°47′41″N 0°55′56″W	1118334	Parish Church of St Nicholas More images
Tyringham Hall	Cuddington	Country house	16th century	25 October 1951	SP7368811228; 51°47′41″N 0°55′59″W	1118328	Tyringham Hall More images
Dinton Castle	Dinton-with-Ford and Upton	Folly	1769	25 October 1951	SP7654011548; 51°47′50″N 0°53′29″W	1118308	Dinton Castle More images
Dinton Hall	Dinton, Dinton-with-Ford and Upton	Country house	c.1500	25 October 1951	SP7664111038; 51°47′34″N 0°53′25″W	1158977	Dinton Hall More images
Waldridge Manor	Meadle, Dinton-with-Ford and Upton	House	1925	25 October 1951	SP7817507273; 51°45′31″N 0°52′08″W	1118307	Waldridge Manor
Church of St John the Baptist	Dorton	Church	Mid-17th century	21 December 1967	SP6788713944; 51°49′12″N 1°00′59″W	1158465	Church of St John the Baptist More images
Church of Holy Trinity	Drayton Parslow	Church	12th century	19 August 1959	SP8373228412; 51°56′52″N 0°46′59″W	1289256	Church of Holy Trinity More images
The Old Rectory	Drayton Parslow	House	1753	19 August 1959	SP8375828352; 51°56′51″N 0°46′58″W	1289258	Upload Photo
Church of St Martin	Dunton	Church	12th century	19 August 1959	SP8237824372; 51°54′42″N 0°48′14″W	1211972	Church of St Martin More images
Botolph House	Botolph Claydon, East Claydon	House	c.1712	19 August 1959	SP7341924828; 51°55′02″N 0°56′02″W	1212143	Upload Photo
Church of St Mary	East Claydon	Church	14th century	19 August 1959	SP7400325534; 51°55′24″N 0°55′31″W	1289625	Church of St Mary More images
Church of St Michael	Edgcott	Church	12th century	13 July 1966	SP6800022796; 51°53′58″N 1°00′47″W	1214280	Church of St Michael More images
Barn at Church Farm	Edlesborough	Barn	15th–16th century	26 September 1951	SP9719919265; 51°51′49″N 0°35′23″W	1319209	Barn at Church Farm
House adjacent to west boundary of Whipsnade Zoo to east of B4506, about 0.25 kilometres to north of Dagnall	Dagnall, Edlesborough	Detached house	1933–36	1 September 1988	SP9971416887; 51°50′30″N 0°33′14″W	1300803	Upload Photo
Church of St Mary	Fleet Marston	Church	12th century	21 December 1967	SP7796715966; 51°50′13″N 0°52′11″W	1117838	Church of St Mary More images
St Leonard's	Foscott	House	12th century	13 July 1966	SP7168135761; 52°00′56″N 0°57′25″W	1214918	St Leonard's More images
Church of Holy Trinity, attached walls and railings	Gawcott, Gawcott with Lenborough	Church	1827	13 October 1952	SP6799431829; 51°58′51″N 1°00′41″W	1205788	Church of Holy Trinity, attached walls and railings More images
Church of St John the Baptist	Green End, Granborough	Church	14th century	19 August 1959	SP7678025000; 51°55′06″N 0°53′06″W	1212350	Church of St John the Baptist More images
Church of St Mary	Great Brickhill	Church	Mid-13th century	18 October 1966	SP9011430786; 51°58′06″N 0°41′23″W	1115994	Church of St Mary More images
Church of St James	Great Horwood	Church	14th century	19 August 1959	SP7707331206; 51°58′26″N 0°52′46″W	1213275	Church of St James More images
Manor Farmhouse	Great Horwood	House	17th century	4 June 1952	SP7729631557; 51°58′38″N 0°52′34″W	1213486	Upload Photo
Church of St Leonard	Grendon Underwood	Church	15th century	21 December 1967	SP6772020985; 51°53′00″N 1°01′03″W	1332808	Church of St Leonard More images
Shakespeare Farmhouse	Grendon Underwood	Farmhouse	Late 16th century and 17th century	25 October 1951	SP6784620856; 51°52′56″N 1°00′57″W	1124272	Upload Photo
Barn to south west of Manor Farmhouse	Church End, Haddenham	Barn	15th century	25 October 1951	SP7406307892; 51°45′53″N 0°55′41″W	1159107	Upload Photo
Church Farmhouse	Haddenham	Farmhouse	15th century	25 October 1951	SP7419608025; 51°45′58″N 0°55′34″W	1233925	Upload Photo
Grenville Manor	Haddenham	House	18th century	25 October 1951	SP7428008045; 51°45′58″N 0°55′30″W	1118281	Upload Photo
Middle Turn, The Turn, Turn End and retaining walls and pool	Haddenham	House	1964–67	15 July 1998	SP7395408666; 51°46′18″N 0°55′47″W	1375663	Upload Photo
Halton House	Halton	Country house	1881–83	11 October 1985	SP8803310108; 51°46′58″N 0°43′31″W	1332843	Halton House More images
Church of St Mary	Hardwick	Church	Late Pre-Conquest	21 December 1967	SP8065418982; 51°51′49″N 0°49′48″W	1319256	Church of St Mary More images
Hardwick Place	Hardwick	Vicarage	16th–17th century	25 October 1951	SP8048819154; 51°51′55″N 0°49′57″W	1319255	Upload Photo
Church of the Holy Cross	Hoggeston	Church	12th century	19 August 1959	SP8084025027; 51°55′04″N 0°49′34″W	1213255	Church of the Holy Cross More images
Manor Farmhouse	Hoggeston	Farmhouse	Early 17th century	4 June 1952	SP8083824970; 51°55′03″N 0°49′34″W	1213256	Manor Farmhouse More images
The Old Rectory	Hoggeston	House	1784	19 August 1959	SP8089125024; 51°55′04″N 0°49′31″W	1213178	The Old Rectory
Church of All Saints	The Green, Hulcott	Church	14th century	21 December 1967	SP8532916684; 51°50′32″N 0°45′46″W	1281503	Church of All Saints More images
New Manor House	Little Ickford, Ickford	House	1675	25 October 1951	SP6529707147; 51°45′33″N 1°03′19″W	1319080	Upload Photo
12 and 14 Station Road	Ivinghoe	House	Later 13th to early 14th century	15 October 1984	SP9446716225; 51°50′12″N 0°37′49″W	1352692	12 and 14 Station Road
Church of St Nicholas	Little Horwood	Church	Early 13th century	19 August 1959	SP7904630845; 51°58′14″N 0°51′03″W	1213693	Church of St Nicholas More images
Barn at Notley Farm	Long Crendon	Barn	Medieval	19 June 1981	SP7134609232; 51°46′38″N 0°58′02″W	1289035	Barn at Notley Farm
Long Crendon Courthouse	Church End, Long Crendon	Courthouse	15th century	25 October 1951	SP6978309063; 51°46′33″N 0°59′24″W	1214040	Long Crendon Courthouse More images
Warwick Farmhouse	Long Crendon	Farmhouse	18th century and 19th century	19 June 1981	SP6918908844; 51°46′26″N 0°59′55″W	1213243	Upload Photo
Church of St Mary	Marsh Gibbon	Church	13th century	13 July 1966	SP6476123228; 51°54′14″N 1°03′36″W	1214446	Church of St Mary More images
Manor House	Marsh Gibbon	House	17th century	25 September 1951	SP6473823170; 51°54′12″N 1°03′38″W	1214444	Upload Photo
Church of All Saints	Marsworth	Church	Late 12th century	18 October 1966	SP9199114603; 51°49′21″N 0°40′00″W	1161002	Church of All Saints More images
Church of Saint Mary	Mentmore	Church	Early 13th century	18 October 1966	SP9038519776; 51°52′09″N 0°41′19″W	1319266	Church of Saint Mary More images
Manor House	Mentmore	House	Mid-18th century	18 October 1966	SP9068819656; 51°52′05″N 0°41′03″W	1161133	Upload Photo
Church of St Mary	Mursley	Church	14th century	19 August 1959	SP8171128554; 51°56′58″N 0°48′45″W	1288706	Church of St Mary More images
Salden House Farmhouse	Salden, Mursley	House	Late 16th century	4 June 1952	SP8245629767; 51°57′37″N 0°48′05″W	1214311	Upload Photo
Manor Farmhouse	Nether Winchendon	Farmhouse	16th century	25 October 1985	SP7320912246; 51°48′15″N 0°56′23″W	1159881	Upload Photo
Church of St Mary	Oakley	Church	12th century	21 December 1967	SP6419412285; 51°48′20″N 1°04′13″W	1158749	Church of St Mary More images
Church of All Saints	Oving	Church	Early 13th century	21 December 1967	SP7824621373; 51°53′08″N 0°51′52″W	1117846	Church of All Saints More images
Oving House	The Village, Oving	Country house	17th century	25 October 1951	SP7828421206; 51°53′02″N 0°51′51″W	1117811	Oving House
Church of St Mary the Virgin	Padbury	Church	13th century	13 July 1966	SP7214130921; 51°58′20″N 0°57′04″W	1231852	Church of St Mary the Virgin More images
Church of St. Giles	Pitchcott	Church, now house	12th century	21 December 1967	SP7753320419; 51°52′37″N 0°52′30″W	1117813	Church of St. Giles More images
Pitstone Windmill	Pitstone	Post mill	1627	26 September 1951	SP9451015677; 51°49′54″N 0°37′48″W	1310208	Pitstone Windmill More images
Church of St John the Baptist	Preston Bissett	Church	12th century	13 July 1966	SP6578129903; 51°57′49″N 1°02′38″W	1214823	Church of St John the Baptist More images
Brudenell House	Quainton	House	16th century	25 October 1951	SP7492720208; 51°52′32″N 0°54′47″W	1158483	Upload Photo
Cross Farmhouse	Quainton	Farmhouse	1723	25 October 1951	SP7464620171; 51°52′30″N 0°55′02″W	1319249	Cross Farmhouse
Denham Lodge	Denham, Quainton	House	Mid–Late 17th century	25 October 1951	SP7538320530; 51°52′42″N 0°54′23″W	1158606	Denham Lodge More images
Doddershall House	Doddershall, Quainton	House	1689	25 October 1951	SP7201920143; 51°52′31″N 0°57′19″W	1117820	Doddershall House More images
Gatehouse at Denham Lodge	Denham, Quainton	Gatehouse	16th–17th century	21 December 1967	SP7537020504; 51°52′41″N 0°54′23″W	1117819	Upload Photo
Market Cross	Quainton	Cross	15th century	21 December 1967	SP7465720151; 51°52′30″N 0°55′01″W	1117825	Market Cross More images
Numbers 40 to 54 and flanking outbuildings	Quainton	Almshouses	1687	25 October 1951	SP7494320170; 51°52′30″N 0°54′46″W	1311462	Numbers 40 to 54 and flanking outbuildings More images
Townsend Farmhouse	Quainton	House	c.1730s	25 October 1951	SP7420920194; 51°52′31″N 0°55′24″W	1319273	Upload Photo
Radclive Manor	Radclive, Radclive-cum-Chackmore	Manor house	16th century	25 September 1951	SP6753833871; 51°59′57″N 1°01′04″W	1211601	Radclive Manor More images
Parish Church of St Mary Magdalene	Shabbington	Church	c.1100	21 December 1967	SP6666206745; 51°45′20″N 1°02′08″W	1332552	Parish Church of St Mary Magdalene More images
Church of St Edward	Shalstone	Church	1828	13 July 1966	SP6414036435; 52°01′21″N 1°04′00″W	1289865	Church of St Edward More images
Church of the Holy Cross	Slapton	Church	Late 13th–early 14th century	18 October 1966	SP9371520690; 51°52′37″N 0°38′24″W	1117831	Church of the Holy Cross More images
Church of All Saints	Soulbury	Church	1770	18 October 1966	SP8821227028; 51°56′05″N 0°43′06″W	1320152	Church of All Saints More images
Liscombe House and wall with pavilion to south of west wing	Liscombe Park, Soulbury	Country house	Mid-17th century	26 September 1951	SP8859525734; 51°55′23″N 0°42′47″W	1219372	Upload Photo
Lovett House and wall attached to rear	Soulbury	House	1724	26 September 1951	SP8828427108; 51°56′08″N 0°43′02″W	1219292	Lovett House and wall attached to rear More images
Church of St Michael	Steeple Claydon	Church	14th century	13 July 1966	SP7052126743; 51°56′05″N 0°58′32″W	1214937	Church of St Michael More images
Church of St Luke	Stoke Hammond	Church	14th century	18 October 1966	SP8794029772; 51°57′34″N 0°43′18″W	1115981	Church of St Luke More images
Church of St John the Baptist	Stone, Stone with Bishopstone and Hartwell	Church	Norman	21 December 1967	SP7841012247; 51°48′12″N 0°51′51″W	1118457	Church of St John the Baptist More images
Church of St Mary	Hartwell, Stone with Bishopstone and Hartwell	Former church	1753–55	21 December 1967	SP7948612464; 51°48′19″N 0°50′55″W	1160658	Church of St Mary More images
Pavilion (the Cot) south-east of Hartwell House	Hartwell, Stone with Bishopstone and Hartwell	House	c.1730	25 October 1951	SP7976212316; 51°48′14″N 0°50′41″W	1160723	Upload Photo
Stable block and coachhouse south-west of Hartwell House	Hartwell, Stone with Bishopstone and Hartwell	House	18th century	29 October 1951	SP7951912390; 51°48′16″N 0°50′53″W	1332845	Upload Photo
Statue of Frederick, Prince of Wales, south-west of Hartwell House	Hartwell, Stone with Bishopstone and Hartwell	Statue	1757	29 October 1951	SP7957812342; 51°48′15″N 0°50′50″W	1118472	Upload Photo
New Inn Farmhouse with outbuildings behind	Stowe	Farmhouse	1717–19	21 April 1983	SP6817636435; 52°01′20″N 1°00′28″W	1211787	New Inn Farmhouse with outbuildings behind More images
Church of St Mary	Stowe Gardens, Stowe	Church	14th century	13 July 1966	SP6761337352; 52°01′50″N 1°00′57″W	1211870	Church of St Mary More images
The Grotto	Stowe Gardens, Stowe	Grotto	c.1740	21 April 1983	SP6764737501; 52°01′54″N 1°00′55″W	1211941	The Grotto More images
The Pebble Alcove	Stowe Gardens, Stowe	Pavilion	c.1737	21 April 1983	SP6787037016; 52°01′39″N 1°00′44″W	1211948	The Pebble Alcove More images
Church of St Swithun	Swanbourne	Church	13th century	19 August 1959	SP8010527287; 51°56′18″N 0°50′10″W	1214161	Church of St Swithun More images
Church of St Mary	Thornborough	Church	11th–12th century	13 July 1966	SP7431633658; 51°59′47″N 0°55′08″W	1232681	Church of St Mary More images
Church of St Mary Magdalen	Tingewick	Church	Norman arcade	13 July 1966	SP6579633043; 51°59′31″N 1°02′35″W	1212274	Church of St Mary Magdalen More images
Church of St Mary	Turweston	Church	Norman	13 July 1966	SP6003637730; 52°02′05″N 1°07′34″W	1289451	Church of St Mary More images
Turweston House	Turweston	Country house	Early 18th century	31 October 1973	SP6000337758; 52°02′06″N 1°07′36″W	1212658	Upload Photo
Church of St Michael	Waddesdon	Church	Late 12th century	21 December 1967	SP7402316977; 51°50′47″N 0°55′37″W	1117800	Church of St Michael More images
Manor Farmhouse	Weedon	Farmhouse	Early 17th century	25 October 1951	SP8140018330; 51°51′27″N 0°49′10″W	1124301	Upload Photo
Bank Farmhouse	Wendover	Farmhouse	15th century	25 October 1951	SP8705507918; 51°45′47″N 0°44′24″W	1204284	Bank Farmhouse More images
Lychgate and churchyard wall to St Mary's Church	Wendover	Lych gate	1871	11 October 1985	SP8710407359; 51°45′29″N 0°44′22″W	1232487	Lychgate and churchyard wall to St Mary's Church
Parish Church of St Mary	Wendover	Church	14th century	21 December 1967	SP8713307331; 51°45′28″N 0°44′20″W	1118398	Parish Church of St Mary More images
The Hale	Wendover	House	Before c.1435	25 October 1951	SP8926807344; 51°45′28″N 0°42′29″W	1118403	Upload Photo
The Red House	Wendover	House	Early 18th century	25 October 1951	SP8694307981; 51°45′50″N 0°44′30″W	1118430	The Red House More images
Church of St Augustine	Westbury	Church	13th century	13 July 1966	SP6224135612; 52°00′56″N 1°05′40″W	1212959	Church of St Augustine More images
Church of St Mary	Westcott	Church	1867	26 February 1985	SP7167417141; 51°50′54″N 0°57′39″W	1332800	Church of St Mary More images
A–B Test-stands and support structures, former Royal Ordnance Establishment	Westcott	Workshop	1947	23 May 2013	SP7136316472; 51°50′32″N 0°57′56″W	1403959	Upload Photo
C–D Test-stands and support structures, former Royal Ordnance Establishment	Westcott	Workshop	1947	23 May 2013	SP7110016607; 51°50′37″N 0°58′10″W	1403962	Upload Photo
K2 Test Stand, Former Royal Ordnance Establishment	Westcott	Control room	1957–60	23 May 2013	SP7047016944; 51°50′48″N 0°58′42″W	1403971	K2 Test Stand, Former Royal Ordnance Establishment
Manor Farmhouse	Weston Turville	Farmhouse	Late 15th century	25 October 1951	SP8533210700; 51°47′18″N 0°45′51″W	1281120	Upload Photo
Manor House	Weston Turville	House	Early 18th century	25 October 1951	SP8588410405; 51°47′09″N 0°45′23″W	1332909	Upload Photo
Church of St John	Whitchurch	Church	Late 13th–mid-14th century	21 December 1967	SP8027820871; 51°52′50″N 0°50′07″W	1124307	Church of St John More images
Priory Hotel	Whitchurch		Mid-16th century	25 October 1951	SP8019220822; 51°52′49″N 0°50′11″W	1159973	Priory Hotel More images
The Old House and attached garden walls	Whitchurch	House	17th century	25 October 1951	SP8017020888; 51°52′51″N 0°50′12″W	1332786	The Old House and attached garden walls
Ascott House	Ascott, Wing	Country house	1874	26 September 1951	SP8914522680; 51°53′44″N 0°42′21″W	1291467	Ascott House More images
Church of St Peter and St Paul	Wingrave, Wingrave with Rowsham	Church	Late 12th century	18 October 1966	SP8691419059; 51°51′48″N 0°44′21″W	1115952	Church of St Peter and St Paul More images
Church of St Laurence	Winslow	Church	14th century	19 August 1959	SP7693227653; 51°56′31″N 0°52′56″W	1287430	Church of St Laurence More images
Keach's Meeting House and graveyard walls	Winslow	Baptist chapel	17th century	19 August 1959	SP7695227483; 51°56′26″N 0°52′55″W	1227954	Keach's Meeting House and graveyard walls
Church of St Peter and St Paul	Worminghall	Church	14th century	21 December 1967	SP6425208031; 51°46′02″N 1°04′13″W	1158914	Church of St Peter and St Paul More images
The Almshouses	Worminghall	Almshouse	1675	25 October 1951	SP6411908428; 51°46′15″N 1°04′20″W	1124253	The Almshouses
Church of All Saints	Wotton Underwood	Church	14th century	21 December 1967	SP6883715942; 51°50′16″N 1°00′08″W	1124216	Church of All Saints More images
