= Buckingham Town Hall =

Municipal building in Buckingham, Buckinghamshire, England

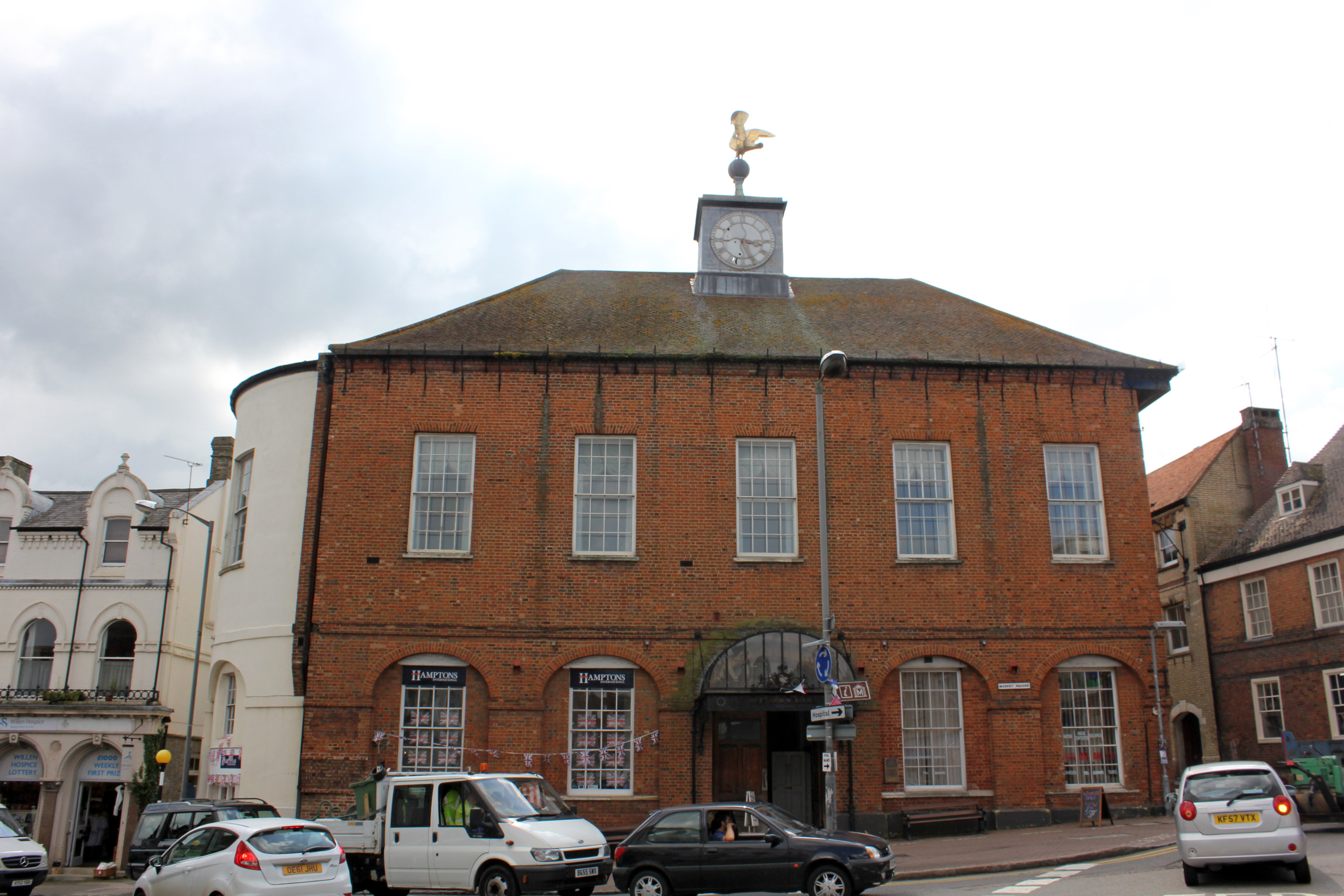
- Buckingham Town Hall

- Shown in Buckinghamshire
- 51.9997°N 0.9880°W
- Location: Market Square, Buckingham

History
- Built: 1783

Site notes
- Architectural style: Georgian style

Listed Building – Grade II*
- Official name: Old Town Hall
- Designated: 15 February 1996
- Reference no.: 1282685

Buckingham Town Hall is a municipal building in the Market Square, Buckingham, Buckinghamshire, England. The structure, which was the meeting place of Buckingham Borough Council, is a Grade II* listed building.

== History ==
The first town hall in Buckingham was erected in the Market Place on the initiative of the local member of parliament, Sir Ralph Verney in 1685. When it became dilapidated in the mid-18th century, civic leaders decided to erect a new building slightly to the south of the original structure.

The new building was designed in the Georgian style, built in red brick and was completed in 1783. The design involved a symmetrical main frontage with five bays facing onto the Market Square; the central bay featured a round headed doorway with a fanlight; there were sash windows which were recessed in blank arcading on the ground floor and plain sash windows on the first floor. On the left hand side, there was a semi-circular projection and, at roof level, there was a dentilled cornice and a clock turret with a finial surmounted by a copper swan, which recalled the coat of arms of the town. The turret contained a bell, 'probably seventeenth-century, possibly earlier', on which the clock struck the hours.

Internally, the principal room was the assembly room on the first floor which had a high ceiling and was accessed using a fine staircase which had been recovered from the first town hall. Also on the first floor was a court room, used for the Quarter Sessions and the fortnightly Petty Sessions. The summer Assizes were also held here from 1748 to 1848 (after which they relocated to Aylesbury). The upper floor of the building was used by the local Literary and Scientific Institution; the ground floor had a council chamber, and offices for the borough and county magistrates and others.

The town became a municipal borough with the town hall as its headquarters in 1835. After the 2nd Duke of Buckingham was declared bankrupt in 1847, the borough council acquired ownership of the building, albeit with a large mortgage. The suffragettes, Lilias Ashworth, Lydia Becker and Helen Beedy, gave speeches advocating voting rights for women at a public meeting in the building chaired by future member of parliament, Egerton Hubbard, in October 1875.

In 1882 the clock dial was illuminated. In 1885, the borough council paid off the mortgage that it had taken out to acquire the town hall. In the early 20th century, the building was slightly shortened on the right hand side in order to facilitate the widening of Castle Street: this left a section of the cornice overhanging the street. An iron canopy was erected above the main doorway at around the same time.

The politician, Frank Markham, was lifted shoulder-high outside the town hall, after standing as the Conservative Party candidate and being elected member of parliament for the local constituency by a very small margin in the 1951 general election. Another politician, Robert Maxwell, who had represented the Labour Party as the local member of parliament for six years, was so angry after losing his seat in the 1970 general election that he persuaded one of his supporters, Eleanor Berry, to climb onto the roof of the town hall and to wave the red flag.

The town hall continued to serve as the headquarters of the borough council until 1965, when the council moved to Castle House on West Street.

A Wurlitzer theatre organ with three manuals, which had been recovered from the Metropole Cinema in Victoria, London was installed in the town hall in 1963; however, after concerns were raised that it might cause structural damage to the building, it was transferred to the Assembly Hall in Worthing in 1981. The ground floor, which had been occupied by a firm of estate agents, became home to a firm of solicitors in 2018. Meanwhile, the assembly room continued to be used as an events venue.

== See also ==
- Grade II* listed buildings in Aylesbury Vale
