= Municipal Borough of Aylesbury =

Former local government area in the UK

Coordinates: 51.8168°N 0.8124°W

Aylesbury
- Local Board District (1849-1894); Urban District (1894-1916); Municipal borough (1917–1974)
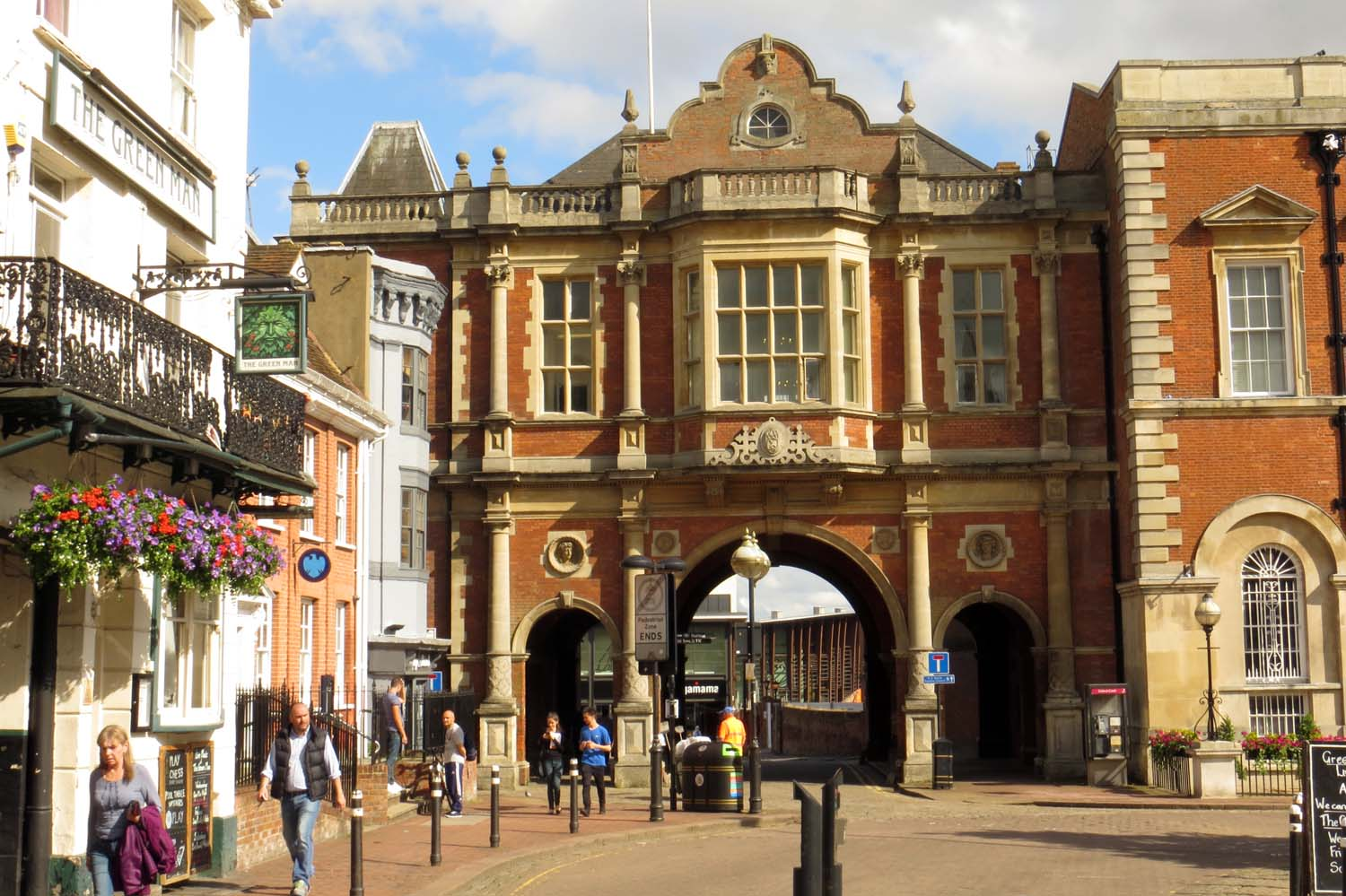
- Aylesbury Town Hall, council's headquarters 1901-1968
- Area
  - 1911: 3,288 acres (13.3 km^{2})
  - 1961: 3,594 acres (14.5 km^{2})
- Population
  - 1901: 9,243
  - 1971: 38,305
- History
  - Created: 5 September 1849 (Local Board District); 31 December 1894 (Urban District); 1 January 1917 (Municipal Borough)
  - Abolished: 31 March 1974
  - Succeeded by: Aylesbury Vale
  - HQ: Aylesbury

The town of Aylesbury formed a local government district in Buckinghamshire, England from 1849 to 1974. It was administered as a local board district from 1849 to 1894, as an urban district from 1894 to 1916, and as a municipal borough from 1917 until its abolition in 1974.

== History ==
The parish of Aylesbury was declared to be a local board district on 5 September 1849, to be governed by a local board of health. After elections, the Aylesbury Local Board of Health held its first meeting on 17 October 1849.

Under the Local Government Act 1894, local board districts became urban districts with effect from 31 December 1894. Aylesbury Urban District Council held its first meeting on 3 January 1895 at County Hall in the Market Square in Aylesbury. Henry Wyatt was elected the first chairman of the council.

On 1 January 1917 the town was granted municipal borough status under the Municipal Corporations Act 1882. The first mayor was Robert William Locke.

== Premises ==
In its early years, the Aylesbury Local Board met at an office on Walton Street. Sometime between 1867 and 1880 the local board moved its offices to 1 Rickford's Hill, and by 1890 was also using 2 Rickford's Hill as a secondary office.

When the urban district council was established to replace the local board in 1894 it initially continued to use the Rickford's Hill offices, but held its meetings at County Hall. In 1900 the council leased the corn exchange on Market Square, and moved its offices there. The following year the council bought the building. At a meeting on 4 March 1901 the council voted to change the name of the building from Corn Exchange to Aylesbury Town Hall.

The council remained based at Town Hall until 1968, when it moved to 4 Great Western Street, being part of the newly built Friars Square shopping centre on the western side of Market Square. The council would remain based there until its abolition in 1974.

== Abolition ==
Aylesbury Borough Council was abolished under the Local Government Act 1972, merging with neighbouring districts to become Aylesbury Vale district on 1 April 1974. No successor parish was established for the town and it was therefore directly administered by Aylesbury Vale District Council. The civil parish of Aylesbury was re-established in 2001, with its council taking the name "Aylesbury Town Council".
