= Buckingham Borough Police =

Defunct police force

Buckingham Borough Police was the police force responsible for policing the Borough of Buckingham, situated in the county of Buckinghamshire, England until 1892.

It was formed as a result of the Municipal Corporations Act 1835. The force was amalgamated into the Buckinghamshire Constabulary following the Local Government Act 1888. At the time of its abolition the force had a strength of four officers, comprising a head constable, one sergeant and two constables.

Today, the area is policed by the successor to Buckinghamshire Constabulary, Thames Valley Police.
