= Henrietta Tindal =

British poet and novelist

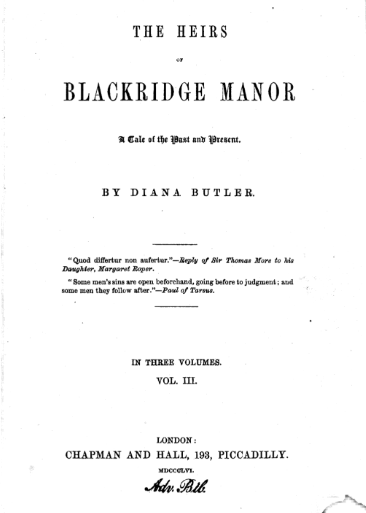
- Title page of Tindal's novel The Heirs of Blackridge Manor (1856)
- Born: Henrietta Euphemia Harrison baptised 1817 in Duffield
- Died: 6 May 1879
- Other names: Mrs. Acton Tindal; Diana Butler (pseud.)
- Occupation: writer
- Spouse: Acton Tindal
- Children: five

Henrietta Euphemia Harrison (bap. 1817 – 6 May 1879), later Mrs. Acton Tindal, was a British poet and novelist who wrote as Diana Butler.

== Life ==
Tindal was baptised in 1817. Her mother was Elizabeth (born Wollaston) and her father was John Harrison of Ramsey, Essex, Vicar of Dinton, Buckinghamshire. She learnt about English poetry and she developed some facility in French and Italian. She was her parents' only surviving child and heir.

In 1846 she married Acton Tindal who lived at the Manor House in Aylesbury, as his father and grandfather had. He was Lord of the Aylesbury manors as he had purchased those rights. He was also Buckingham's clerk of the peace. They had five children, including twin daughters. One of the twins, Henrietta Diana, died when she was nine.

Tindal's 1849 book of poetry titled "Rhyme and Reason" was said to show her increased abilities.

Her friend Mary Russell Mitford acclaimed her story "The Infant Bride". Tindal used her knowledge of French, Italian, and the arts in her prose and poetry.

Her only novel, The Heirs of Blackridge Manor, was published in 1856.

She died in 1879 with four surviving children and she was later included as a "Worthy of Buckinghamshire".

Her story "The Strange Story of Kitty Hancomb" (1862) was reprinted in Temple Bar in 1880. The story describes how Lord Dalmeny in the 18th century had married a clergyman's wife by mistake. It had originally been published under her non de plume, Diana Butler, but in the reprinted edition it was titled "Kitty Canham" by Mrs Acton Tindal.
