= St Mary's Church, Fleet Marston =

Coordinates: 51.8369°N 0.8697°W

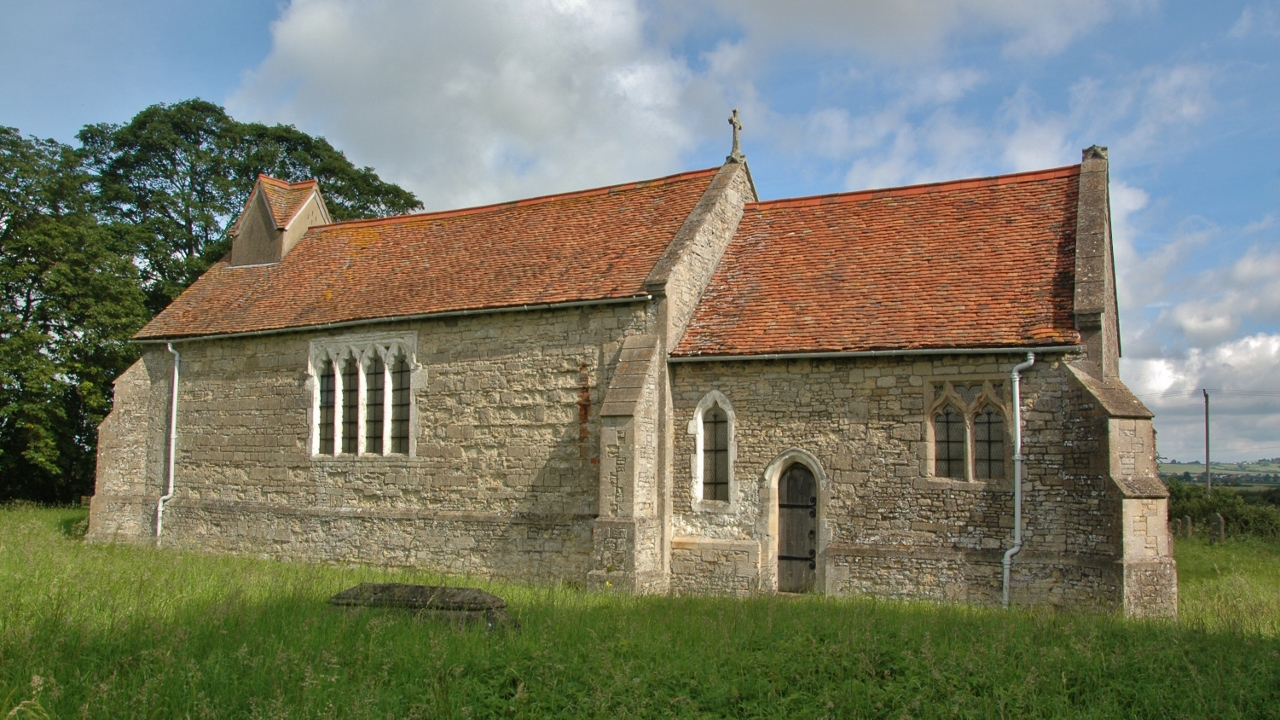

- Location in Buckinghamshire
- OS grid reference: SP779159
- Location: Fleet Marston, Buckinghamshire
- Country: England
- Denomination: Church of England
- Website: Churches Conservation Trust

History
- Dedication: Saint Mary

Architecture
- Functional status: Redundant
- Heritage designation: Grade II*
- Designated: 21 December 1967
- Architect: George Gilbert Scott (restoration)
- Style: Gothic

Specifications
- Materials: Stone, roofs tiled

St Mary's Church is the redundant Church of England parish church of the deserted medieval village of Fleet Marston, Buckinghamshire, England. It is recorded in the National Heritage List for England as a designated Grade II* listed building, and is under the care of the Churches Conservation Trust. The church stands in a field to the northeast of the A41 road, some 2 miles (3 km) northwest of Aylesbury. John Wesley preached his first sermon in the church soon after he was ordained deacon in September 1725.

== History ==
The church dates from the 12th and 13th centuries, and probably stands on the site of an earlier church. Alterations were made in the 14th and 15th centuries. It was restored in 1868 by George Gilbert Scott. The church was declared redundant on 20 January 1972 and was vested in the Churches Conservation Trust on 24 October 1973.

== Architecture ==
St Mary's is built of coursed rubble stone and has tiled roofs. The church stands on a plinth and has diagonal buttresses. Its plan consists of a nave with a north porch, and a chancel. At the west end of the gable is a bellcote. In the north wall of the nave, in addition to the porch, is a large single-light window, and a restored 15th-century two-light window. The south wall contains a four-light window. In the north and east walls of the chancel are single-light windows. In the south wall is a similar window, a two-light window, and a doorway.

Inside the church is a chancel arch dating from the early 14th century. It is carried on semi-octagonal piers whose capitals are decorated with ball flower motifs. The roof dates from the 15th century. In a window-sill on the south of the chancel is a piscina. The font consists of a circular bowl on a plain stem, and possibly dates from the 13th century. In the church are memorial tablets dating from the late 18th and the 19th centuries.

== See also ==
- List of churches preserved by the Churches Conservation Trust in South East England
