= Dinton Castle =

Castle in Buckinghamshire, England

Coordinates: 51.7973°N 0.8915°W

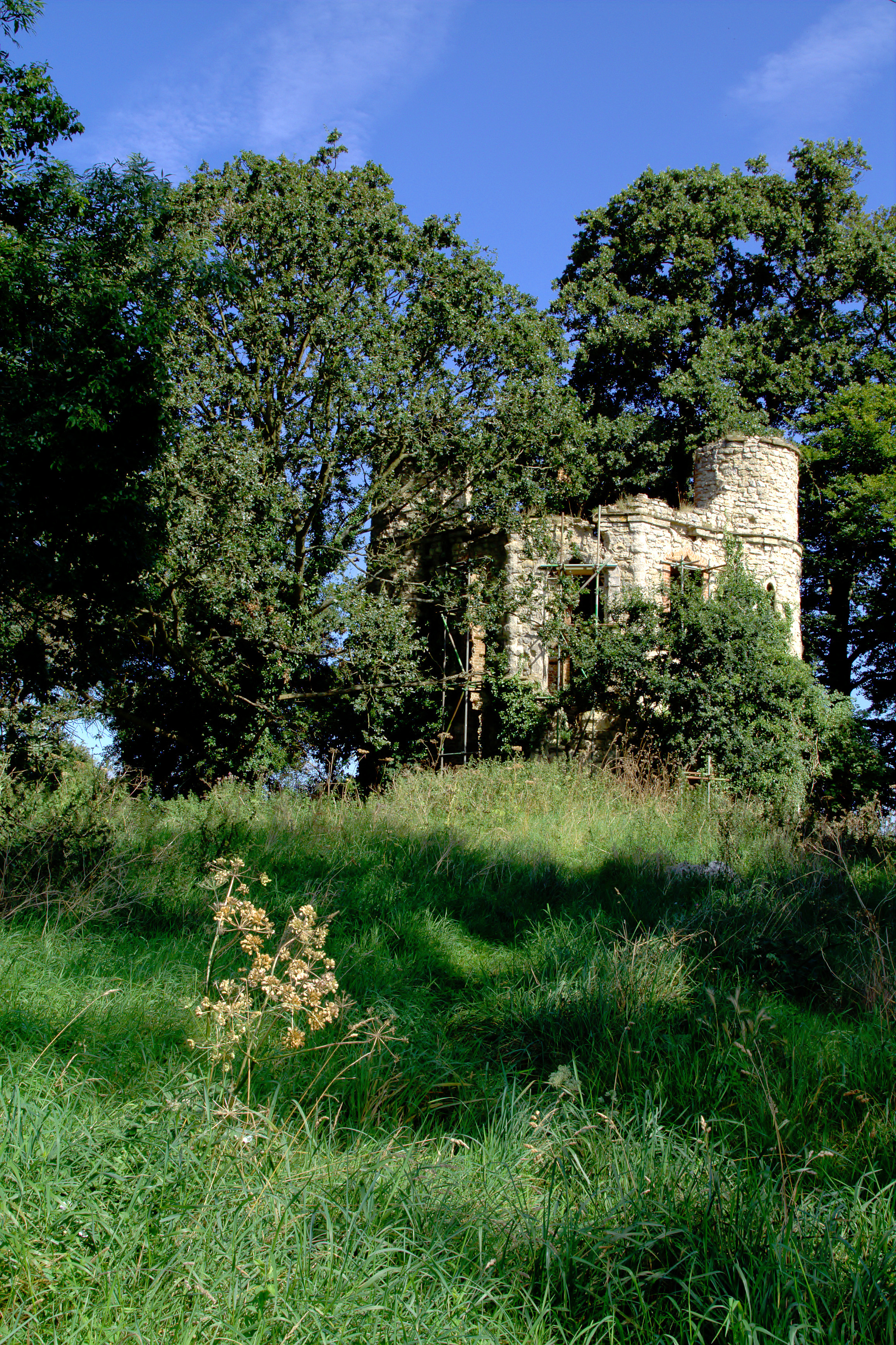

Dinton Castle (also known as Dinton Folly) is located just north of the village of Dinton, in Buckinghamshire and was built as an eyecatcher from the Dinton Hall estate, by Sir John Vanhatten in 1769. He used the castle to exhibit his collection of fossils, ammonites, embedded in the limestone walls. The "sham castle" or folly is a Priority A site with the Heritage at Risk Register and has been a Grade II Listed structure since 1951 when it was in a ruinous state.

== History ==
Dinton Castle at Oxford Road, Aylesbury, Buckinghamshire, UK HP17 8TX is located beside a Saxon burial ground. Into the 20th century, various artifacts and skeletons had been found near the structure. Local rumours suggested that the castle was haunted by the seventeenth century hermit John Bigg, who lived until his death in a cave on the property prior to the castle's build.

The castle may have been used as servants' quarters for Dinton Hall in the 1800s. At some point it also may have served as a temporary meeting place for a local non-conformist congregation.

When Grade II Listed in 1951, the summary stated: "Octagonal plan with circular towers at east and west. 2 storeys, the towers carried up to 3 storeys". In the late 20th century, the castle was added to the English Heritage at Risk Register and onto the council's Buildings at Risk Register.

A BBC article indicated the property had been sold in 2012 with another source stating the purchaser was Brett O'Consnor. At this time the castle was still a ruin.

== Restoration ==
In 2009, the structure was stabilized, new lintels were installed, some windows and the entrance arch were repaired.

In 2016, the property was purchased by a Spanish architect, Jaime (or Jimmy) Fernandez, and his English wife Mimi who had grown up near the castle. On 26 Jan 2017 planning permission was granted Fernandez by Aylesbury Vale District Council for the castle's renovation into a two-bedroom dwelling.

The 2017-2018 restoration of Dinton Castle into a family home drew media interest. In September 2018 the process of the transformation of the building from a ruin was featured on Channel 4's Grand Designs programme and Grand Design published a series of photographs detailing the results produced by the renovations. The restoration was also featured in an article in the Wall Street Journal. The building was described as follows by Country Life in February 2020:

Three quirky, octagonal floors rise from almost an acre of Waddesdon Estate countryside, which one can view in its fullest from the panoramic roof terrace. The building houses a sitting room, two en-suite bedrooms and a welcoming kitchen on the ground floor.

The renovation cost over £300,000, on top of the original £100,000 purchase price. After the restoration, the castle was home to the Fernandez family, with their two children, for the next five years.

The Fernandezes sold the castle in 2021 citing their family had outgrown the property. The new owner made Dinton Castle available on Airbnb in June 2022.
