= Aylesbury Town Hall =

Municipal building in Aylesbury, Buckinghamshire, England

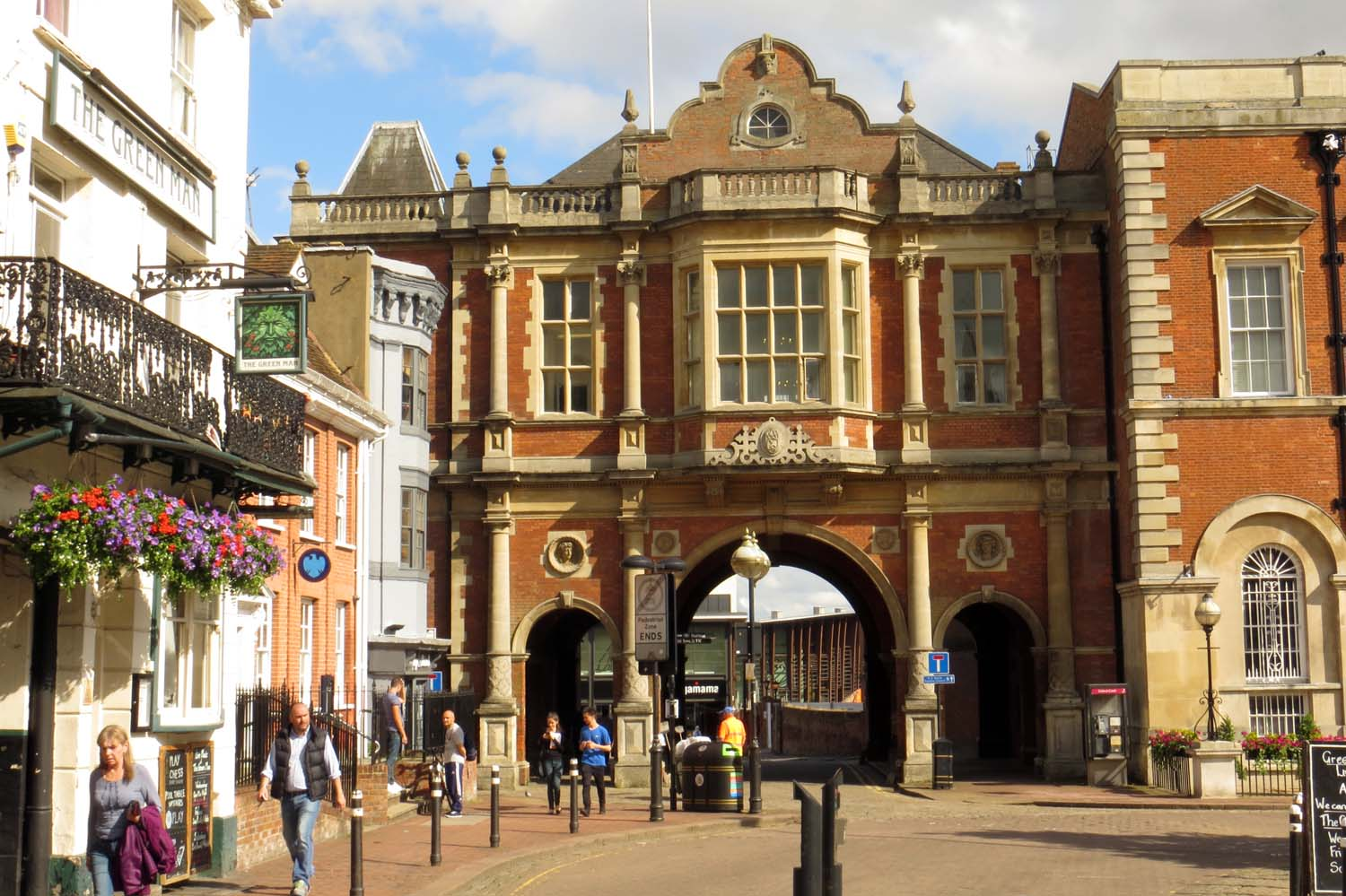
- Town Hall Arches

- Shown in Buckinghamshire
- 51.8158°N 0.8117°W
- Location: Market Square, Aylesbury

History
- Built: 1865

Site notes
- Architect: David Brandon
- Architectural style: Jacobean style

Listed Building – Grade II*
- Designated: 7 April 1952
- Reference no.: 1117935

Aylesbury Town Hall is a name which has been used for two different buildings in Aylesbury, Buckinghamshire, England. Since 2007 the name has been used for an office building at 5 Church Street, which serves as the headquarters of Aylesbury Town Council. The name was also formerly used for a complex of buildings which had been built in 1865 as a corn exchange in Market Square, and which served as the offices and meeting place of the local council from 1901 to 1968. The majority of the old town hall was demolished shortly afterwards, leaving only the entrance archway facing Market Square still standing, now called Town Hall Arches. This remaining part of the old town hall is a Grade II* listed building as part of the range of civic buildings on the southern side of Market Square including the old County Hall.

== Town Hall, Market Square ==
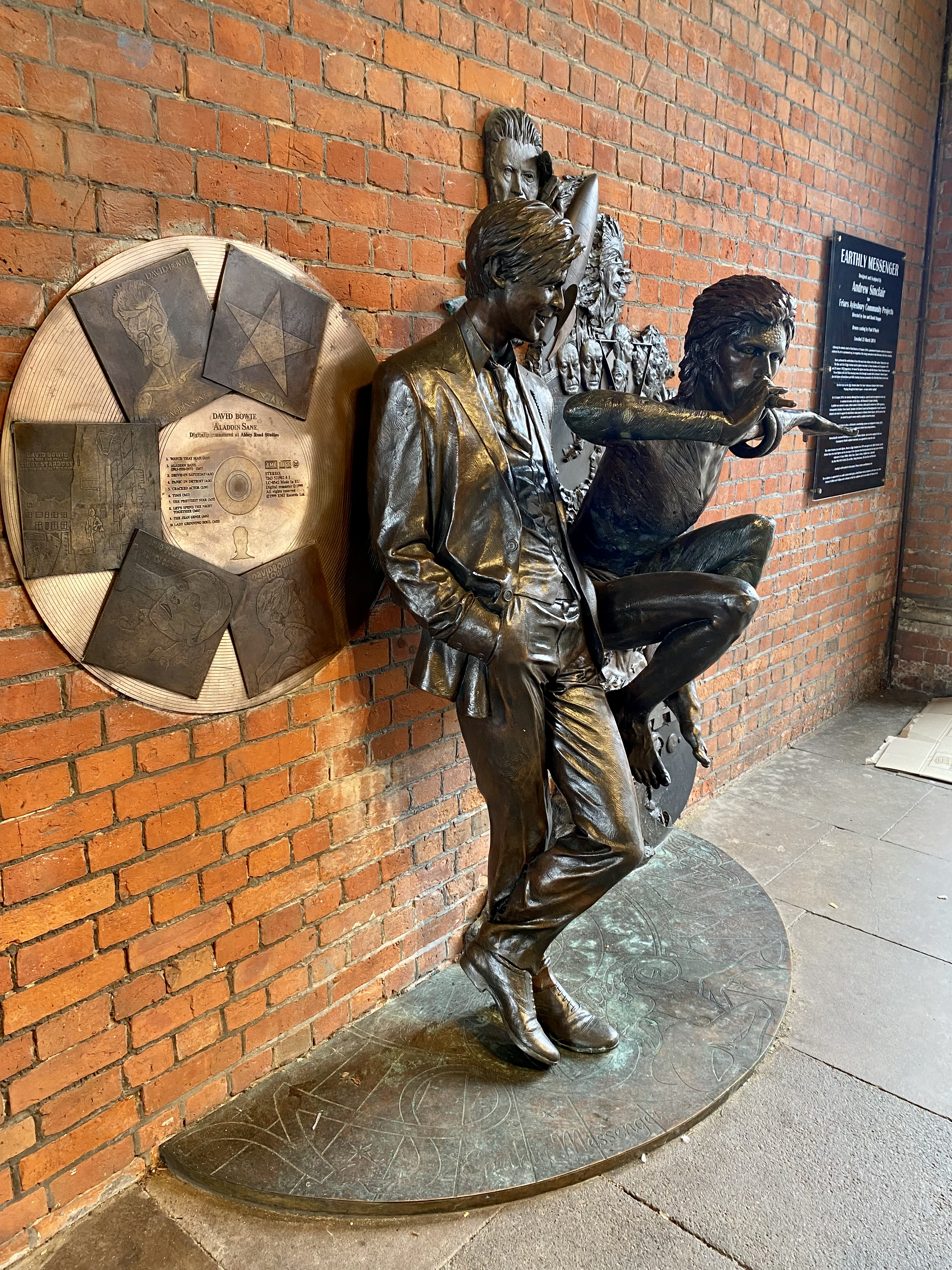
Earthly Messenger, a statue of David Bowie under the arches of the old Town Hall

This building was originally commissioned as a corn exchange by a consortium of local businessmen, who formed a venture known as the "Aylesbury Market Company", which was established with capital of £18,000 under an Act of Parliament in 1863. The site chosen for the building had been occupied the White Hart Inn, a coaching inn. (Note: The White Hart Inn, which had been designed in the neoclassical style, was completed in the 17th century and refaced in stone recovered from Eythrope House in 1814.)

The White Hart Inn was acquired and demolished in 1864. The new building was designed by David Brandon in the Jacobean style, built in red brick with stone dressings and completed in 1865. The building was in three distinct sections, comprising a large corn exchange hall to the east, a single-storey covered market building to the south, and an entrance archway wing to the west, which included the building's main frontage onto Market Square. The design of the archway wing involved a near-symmetrical main frontage with four bays facing onto the Market Square; the right hand three bays, which slightly projected forward, featured a wide carriageway in the middle bay flanked by full height columns with a bay window on the first floor and a parapet and a gable containing an oculus above. The outer bays in the right hand section featured pedestrian archways flanked by full height columns with a mullion window on the first floor and a parapet above. The left hand bay, which was barely visible, was topped with a mansard roof. The Aylesbury Market Company got into financial difficulties caused by the agricultural depression in the 1870s.

Aylesbury had been governed by a local board of health since 1849, which became Aylesbury Urban District Council in 1894. The new council acquired the market rights and ownership of the corn exchange from the company in 1901. At a meeting on 4 March 1901 the council voted to change the name of the building from Corn Exchange to Town Hall. The council converted the former covered market in the southern wing of the building to become its municipal offices, and used the main hall for meetings and public events. The urban district council went on to secure municipal borough status in 1917, becoming Aylesbury Borough Council, with the town hall continuing to serve as its headquarters.

The interior of the town hall was badly damaged in a fire, which was attributed to arson, on 14 March 1962, particularly affecting the main hall and the archway wing. The rear façade of the archway was subsequently rebuilt but without any of the original decoration.

In 1968 the council moved its offices to 4 Great Western Street, being part of the newly built Friars Square shopping centre on the western side of Market Square. The majority of the town hall complex was demolished shortly afterwards, leaving only the archway wing and a small stub of the former main hall of the town hall, which was used as a café. A new civic centre was built on the rest of the site of the town hall, opening in 1975. The civic centre served both as an entertainment venue and as the council chamber and meeting rooms for Aylesbury Vale District Council, which had been formed in 1974 as a merger of the old Aylesbury Borough Council and neighbouring authorities. Aylesbury Vale District Council continued to meet at the civic centre and have its main offices at 4 Great Western Street until 2010, when it relocated out of the town centre to The Gateway on Gatehouse Road.

The civic centre was demolished in 2011, along with the remaining stub of the old main hall of the 1865 building, leaving only the archway wing surviving from that building. The site was redeveloped with a mixed retail and residential development. In recognition of the numerous appearances of David Bowie at the civic centre, a statue of him was erected in 2018 under the Town Hall Arches.

== Town Hall, Church Street ==
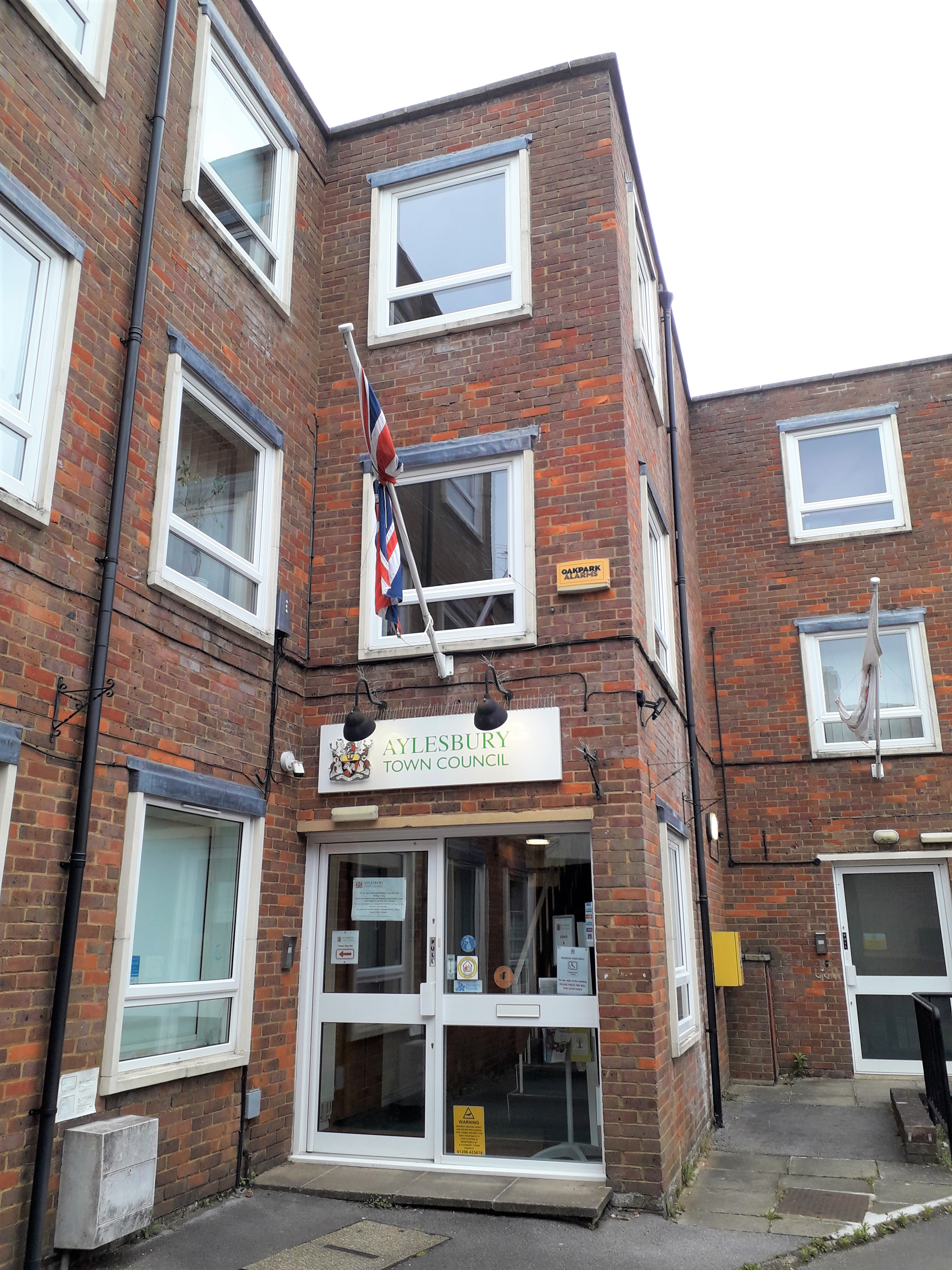
Modern Town Hall at 5 Church Street

When Aylesbury Borough Council was abolished in 1974, the town became an unparished area, directly administered by Aylesbury Vale District Council. A civil parish of Aylesbury was re-established in 2001, with its council taking the name Aylesbury Town Council. In 2007 Aylesbury Town Council bought an existing office building at 5 Church Street, converting it to become their offices and meeting place and renaming it Town Hall.

== See also ==
- Grade II* listed buildings in Aylesbury Vale
