= Municipal Borough of Buckingham =

Former local government area in the UK

Coordinates: 51.999°N 0.987°W

Buckingham
- Ancient borough (c. 915–1835); Municipal borough (1836–1974)
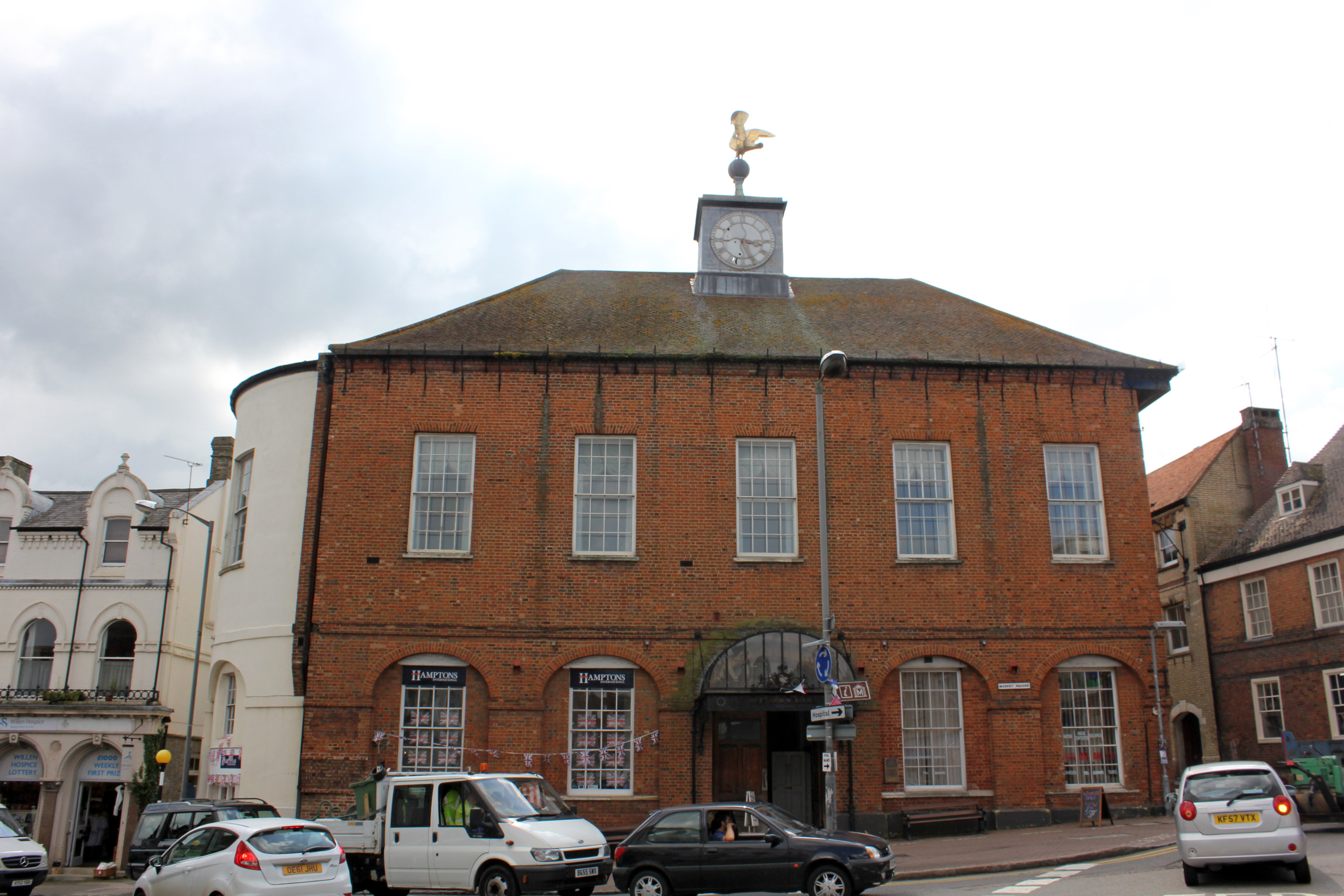
- Town Hall, Market Square, Buckingham: Council's headquarters 1783–1965
- Population
  - 1901: 3,152
  - 1971: 5,005
- History
  - Created: c. 915 (Ancient borough); 1 January 1836 (Municipal borough)
  - Abolished: 31 March 1974
  - Succeeded by: Aylesbury Vale
  - HQ: Buckingham
- Contained within
  - County Council: Buckinghamshire

Buckingham was an ancient borough in England centred on the town of Buckingham in the county of Buckinghamshire, and was first recorded in the 10th century. It was incorporated as a borough in 1553/4 and reformed under the Municipal Corporations Act 1835. In 1974, it was abolished as part of local government re-organisation under the Local Government Act 1972, and absorbed by Aylesbury Vale District Council.

== Ancient borough and manor ==
The Anglo-Saxon Chronicle records that in 915 AD, Edward the Elder ordered the construction of two burhs (earthwork fortifications) either side of the River Great Ouse at Buckingham as part of his campaign against the Danes. According to the Domesday Book in 1086, it had 26 burgesses. Shortly after this date, the manor of Buckingham was granted to Walter Giffard, 1st Earl of Buckingham. It was held by various families until it escheated to the Crown on the attainder of Edward Stafford, 3rd Duke of Buckingham in 1521. Around this date, the term "manor" dropped out of use as applied to Buckingham, and the lordship was thereafter referred to as the "borough of Buckingham". There is known to have been a bailiff from at least 1312 and the town had a "court of portmote" from at least the 13th century.

The borough appears not to have exercised its right to return two burgesses to Parliament until 1529. It was consistently represented as the parliamentary borough of Buckingham from 1545 until 1885.

In 1522 the lordship of the borough was granted to Sir Henry Marny, the grant including the right to hold a weekly market on Saturdays and two annual fairs. In 1526 a further royal grant was made to William Carey, whose son sold the borough to Robert Brocas in 1552.

== Incorporation ==
The borough was incorporated by the charter of Mary I, 27 January 1553/4, under which the borough was to be governed by the bailiff (elected annually) and 12 principal burgesses. The charter also created the office of steward, to be elected by the borough. The bailiff was to hold the offices of escheator, coroner and clerk of the market and to act as a justice of the peace within the borough. The borough was also granted the return of writs to the exclusion of the sheriff of the county.

Among the privileges granted to the borough were a court to be held every three weeks to hear cases of debt, trespass, etc., up to the value of £5 (this "Buckingham Three Weeks Court" appears to have replaced the court of portmote), a weekly market on Tuesdays, two annual fairs with a court of piepowders, a twice-yearly view of frankpledge, the assize of bread and ale, the right to a gaol within the borough and the right to return two burgesses to Parliament.

In 1574 the then lord of the borough, Bernard Brocas, granted a 2000-year lease of the borough to six trustees to hold on behalf of the corporation in return for an annual rent of 40s. The lordship was purchased by Sir Thomas Temple in 1604. Payment of this rent to his successors was discontinued in the 19th century.

In 1684 the borough received a new charter from Charles II, by which the bailiff and principal burgesses were given the new titles of "Mayor and Aldermen". A dispute with James II over the appointment of a new steward, when the king unsuccessfully tried to secure the election of Lord Chancellor George Jeffreys, led to the dismissal of three mayors by the king in 1687–88. In 1688 James restored the charter of Mary I and the older titles of "Bailiff and Principal Burgess" were resumed by the mayor and aldermen. In the 18th century the earliest known references to the offices of recorder and town clerk, not mentioned in the charter, appear.

During the period 1641-1889 the Temple family and their successors the Grenvilles, who later became Marquesses and Dukes of Buckingham and Chandos, also held the post of steward (apart from a brief period in the reign of James II). The borough then acted as a rotten borough; the corporation did little to exercise any powers to administer the town itself, instead serving primarily as a vehicle for overseeing the election of the borough's two members of parliament, which the duke's nominees always won.

== The reformed borough ==
The parliamentary franchise was reformed under the Reform Act 1832; Buckingham retained its two MPs, but the franchise and mode of election was reformed to make it less susceptible to corruption. The parliamentary constituency enlarged at the same time to take in a number of surrounding villages as well as the borough itself.

The local administration of the borough was reformed as a result of the Municipal Corporations Act 1835, becoming a municipal borough on 1 January 1836. The reformed borough was placed in the hands of a mayor, four aldermen and six councillors. It was granted its own Court of Quarter Sessions in 1836 and a small borough police force, Buckingham Borough Police, was formed.

The grant of quarter sessions was revoked in 1890 when the office of recorder was consequently abolished and the town clerk lost his title of clerk of the peace. In 1892 the police force was amalgamated with Buckinghamshire Constabulary.

== Boundaries ==
The boundaries of the borough and parish of Buckingham were co-extensive. As set out in the charter of Mary I, they extended from Dudley bridge in the west to Thornborough bridge in the east and from Chackmore brook in the north to Padbury Mill bridge in the south. The borough comprised six districts or divisions:

- the borough (so-called)
- the district of Bourton Hold
- the precinct of Prebend End
- the hamlet of Bourton
- the hamlet of Gawcott
- the hamlet of Lenborough

The use of the term "borough" to refer to part of the town (presumably the area of the former manor of Buckingham) should not be taken to imply any difference in rights between that district and the borough as a whole.

In addition to the lordship of the borough, other manors within the borough were:

- Prebend End of Buckingham cum Gawcott. This formed part of the endowment of the prebend of Sutton cum Buckingham in Lincoln Cathedral. On the Reformation it became a lay fee which was eventually purchased in 1613 by Sir Thomas Denton of Hillesden. In the 19th century it was purchased by the Duke of Buckingham and Chandos.
- Bourton. This was held with the manor of Buckingham down to 1560. Accounts of 1473-74 show some tenants of the manor holding land within the manor of Buckingham, in Castle End, Castle Street and Well Street, representing in part the district known as Bourton Hold.
- Lenborough

== Premises ==
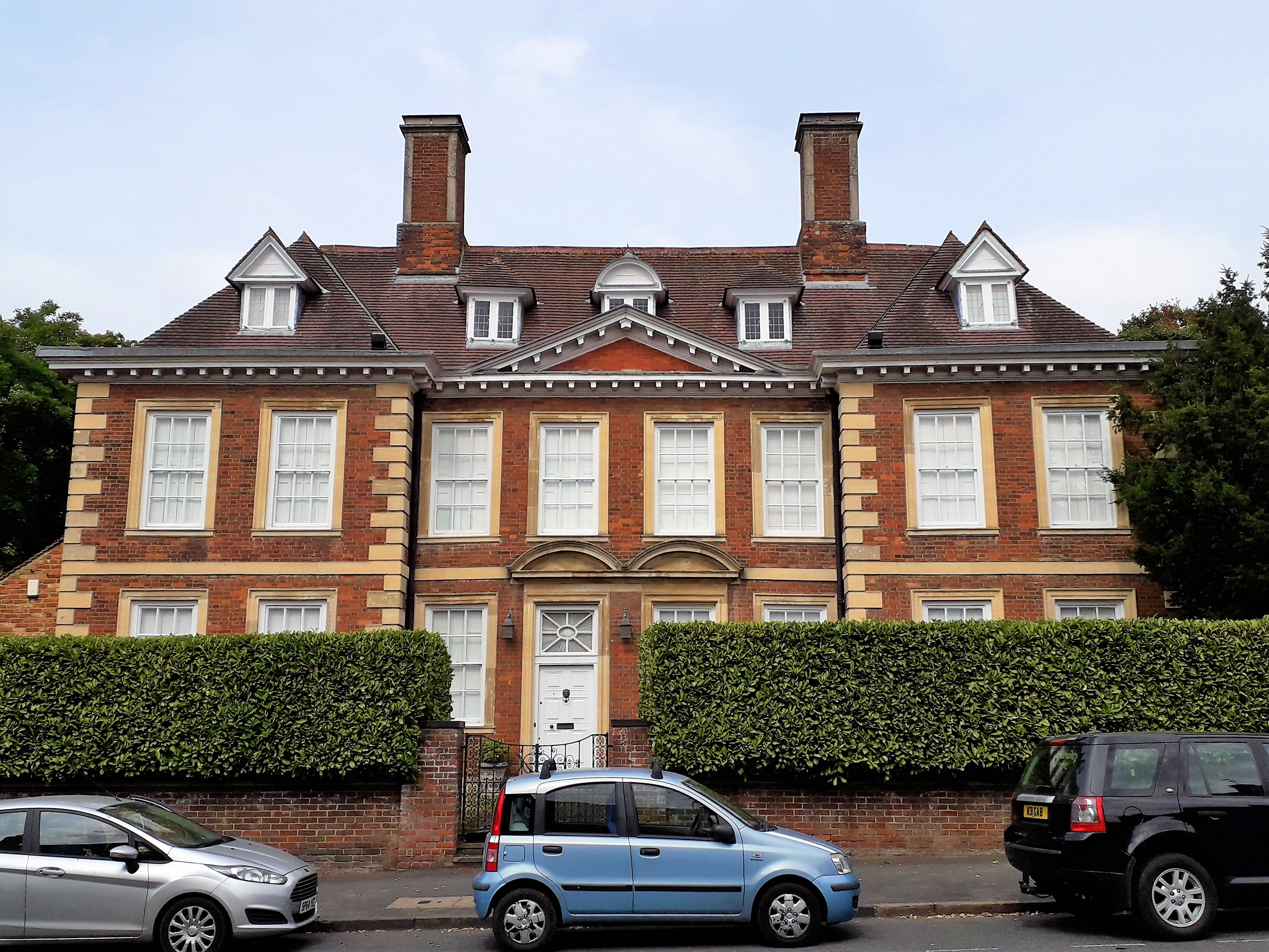
Castle House, West Street, Buckingham

A town hall was built in the Market Place in Buckingham in 1685. This building was replaced by Buckingham Town Hall in 1783. The town hall remained the seat of local government in the town until 1965 when the council moved to Castle House on West Street. The council then remained based at Castle House until its abolition in 1974.

== Abolition ==
The borough council was abolished in 1974 when, as a result of local government re-organization, the borough was merged with Buckingham Rural District and Wing Rural District to create the district of Aylesbury Vale. The Buckingham Three Weeks Court, which had not sat since 1820, was also formally abolished at that time. A successor parish was created for the former area of the borough, with its council adopting the name Buckingham Town Council. Castle House was used as an area office by Aylesbury Vale District Council until the late 1970s, but was then converted back to residential use.
