= St Michael and All Angels' Church, Waddesdon =

Coordinates: 51°50′45.36″N 0°55′37.55″W

St Michael and All Angels’ Church, Waddesdon
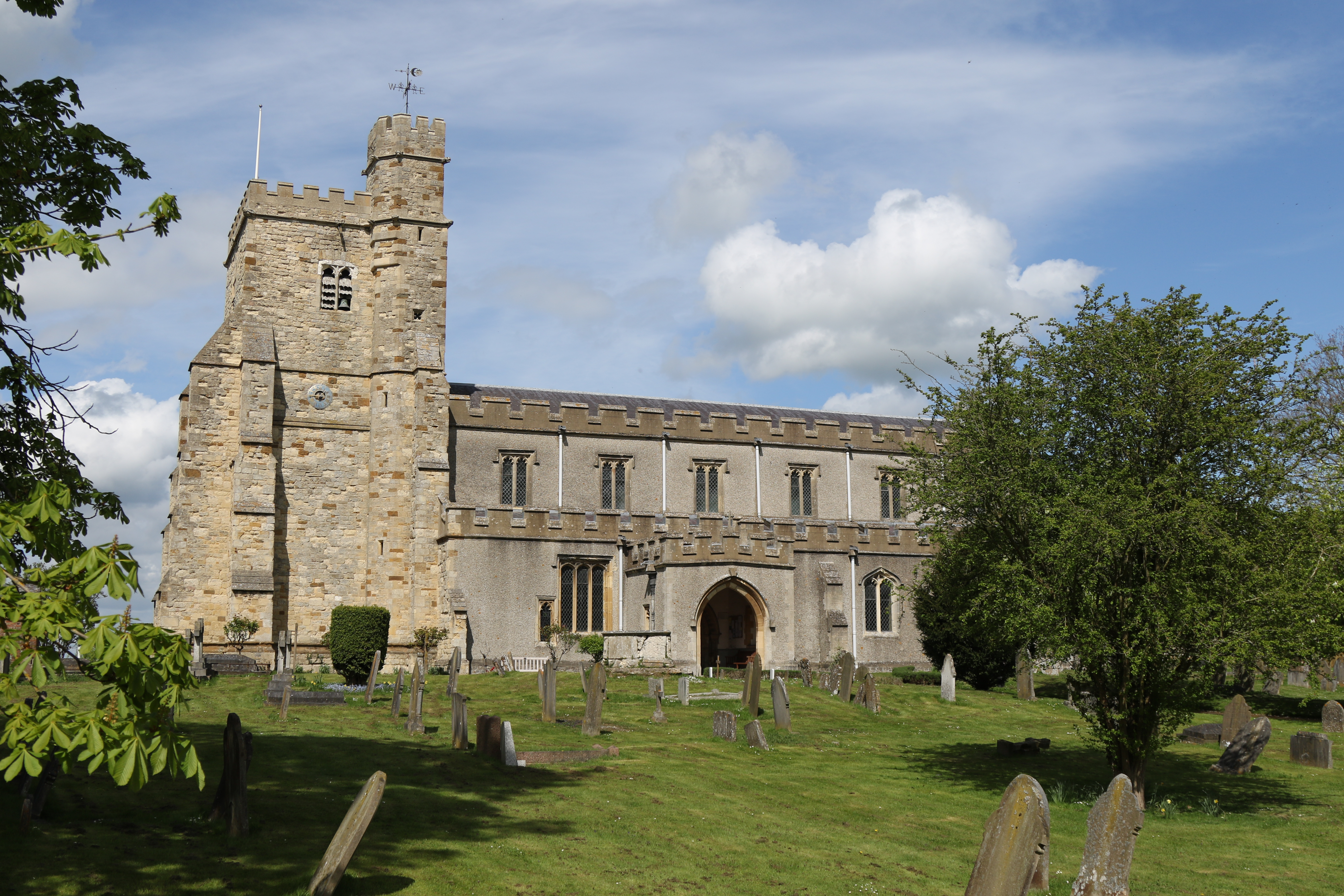
- St Michael and All Angels’ Church, Waddesdon
- St Michael and All Angels’ Church, Waddesdon
- OS grid reference: SP 74023 16977
- Location: Waddesdon
- Country: England
- Denomination: Church of England

History
- Dedication: St Michael and All Angels

Architecture
- Heritage designation: Grade II* listed

Administration
- Diocese: Diocese of Oxford
- Archdeaconry: Buckingham
- Deanery: Claydon
- Parish: Waddesdon

St Michael and All Angels’ Church, Waddesdon is a Grade II* listed parish church in the Church of England in Waddesdon, Buckinghamshire.

== History ==
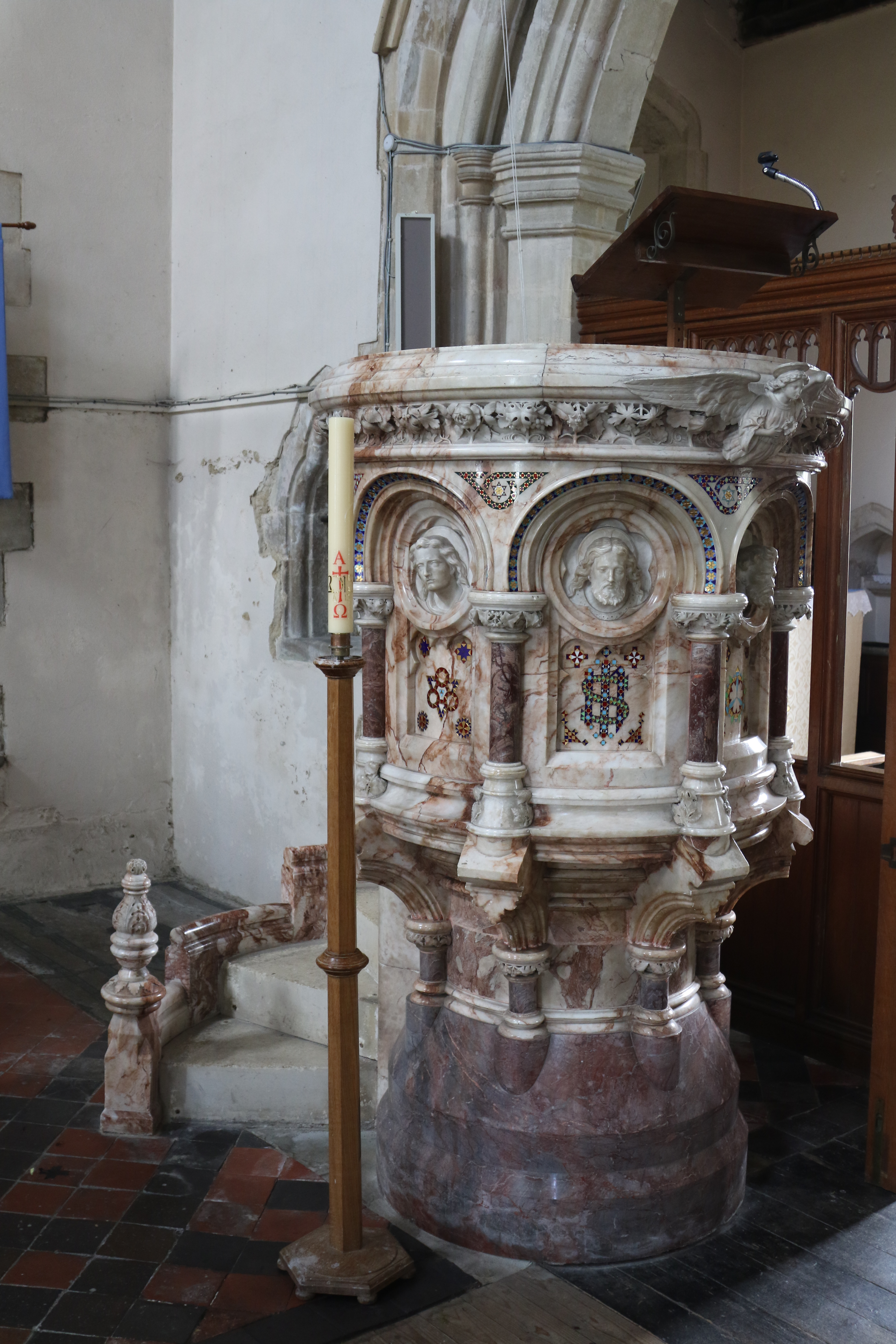
Pulpit from Blenheim Palace chapel

The church dates from the late 12th century. It church comprises a chancel 37 feet (11 m) by 21 feet (6.4 m), nave 81.5 feet (24.8 m) by 23 feet (7.0 m), north aisle 9.5 feet (2.9 m) wide, south aisle 9 feet (2.7 m) wide at the east and 7 feet (2.1 m) wide at the west, south porch, and west tower 15 feet (4.6 m) square.

The three middle columns of the south arcade of the nave, and the west respond, which are of the late 12th century.. The nave and south aisle were extended by around 12 feet (3.7 m) in the 13th century. Early in the 14th century, the nave was extended east again by around 20 feet (6.1 m). The chancel was rebuilt at the same time. Around 1340 the north aisle was added, and towards the end of the 14th century the chancel was widened on the north and the tower was erected.

The eastern half of the south wall of the chancel was rebuilt in the second half of the 15th century, and the clearstory was added to the nave. The south porch was added at the same time, but has subsequently been rebuilt. The church was restored in 1863 under the supervision of the architect J. Chatwin. New bells were inserted in the tower. The stonework of the pillars was renewed where it had deteriorated. The nave, aisles and chancel were paved with blue and red Stafford tiles and the heating apparatus was provided by Rimington of Yorkshire. New seating was provided of stained deal.

The cornerstone of the new tower was laid by the Bishop of Reading on 20 October 1891. The new tower was dedicated on 15 June 1892. The church was restored in 1902.

The church's patron is the Duke of Marlborough. The font was originally in the chapel at Blenheim Palace, but was given to Waddesdon by Charles Spencer-Churchill, 9th Duke of Marlborough in thanksgiving for his safe return from the Second Boer War.

== Parish status ==
The church is in a joint parish with:

- St Martin's Church, Dunton
- St John the Baptist's Church, Granborough
- St Mary the Virgin's Church, Hardwick with Weedon
- Old School Room Chapel, Weedon
- Holy Cross Church, Hoggeston
- Church of the Assumption of the Blessed Virgin Mary, North Marston
- All Saints’ Church, Oving with Pitchcott
- Holy Cross and St Mary's Church, Quainton
- St Mary Magdalene's Church, Over Winchendon
- St Mary the Virgin's Church, Westcott
- St John the Evangelist's Church, Whitchurch

== Memorials ==
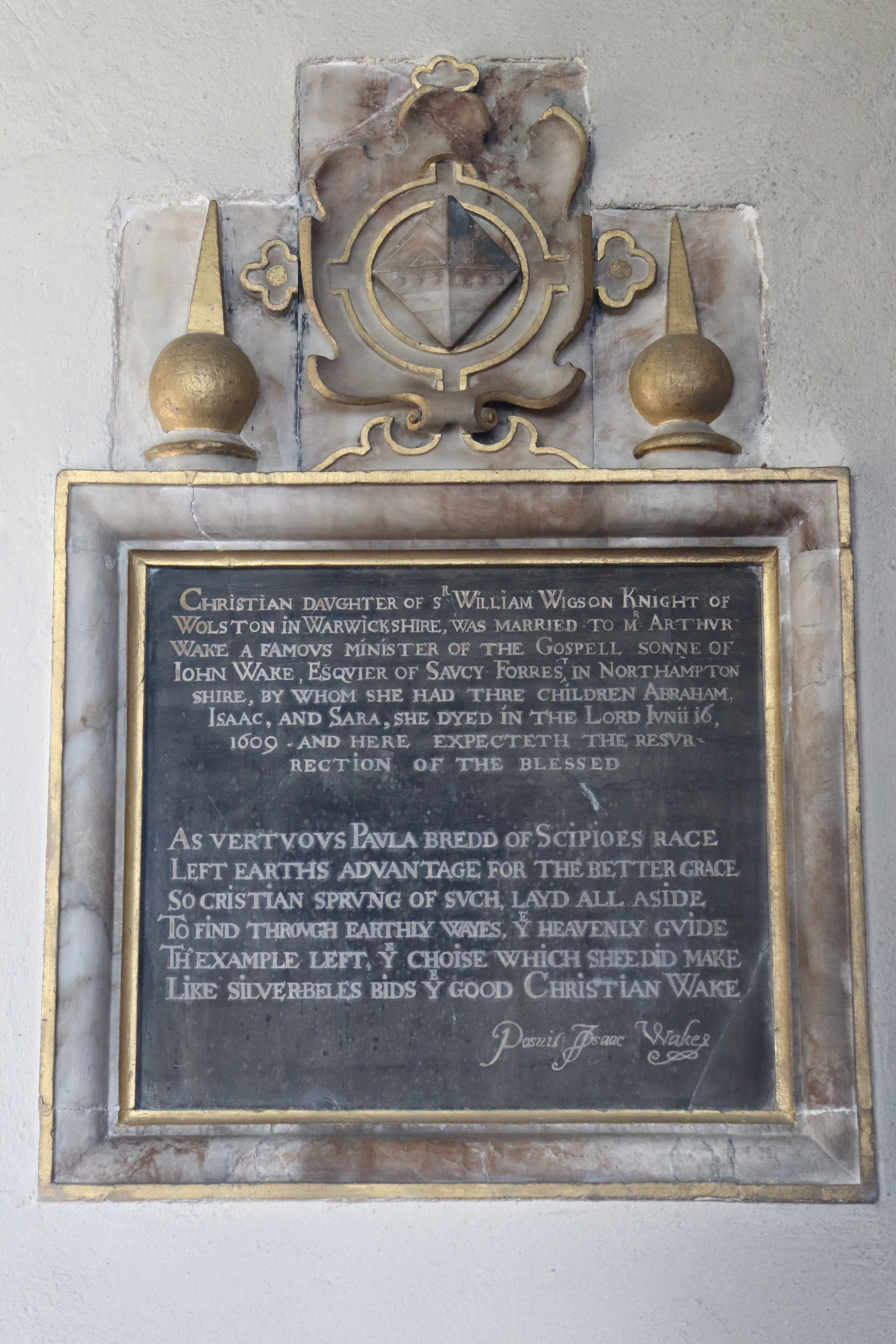
Memorial to Christian Wake

- Guy Carleton (d. 1608)
- Christian Wake (d. 1609)
- John Ellis (ca. 1700)
- Henry Wilkinson (d. 1647)
- Robert Piggott
- Hugh Bristowe (d. 1548)
- Robert Huntyndon (d. 1543)
- Sir Roger Dynham (d. 1490)

== Stained glass ==
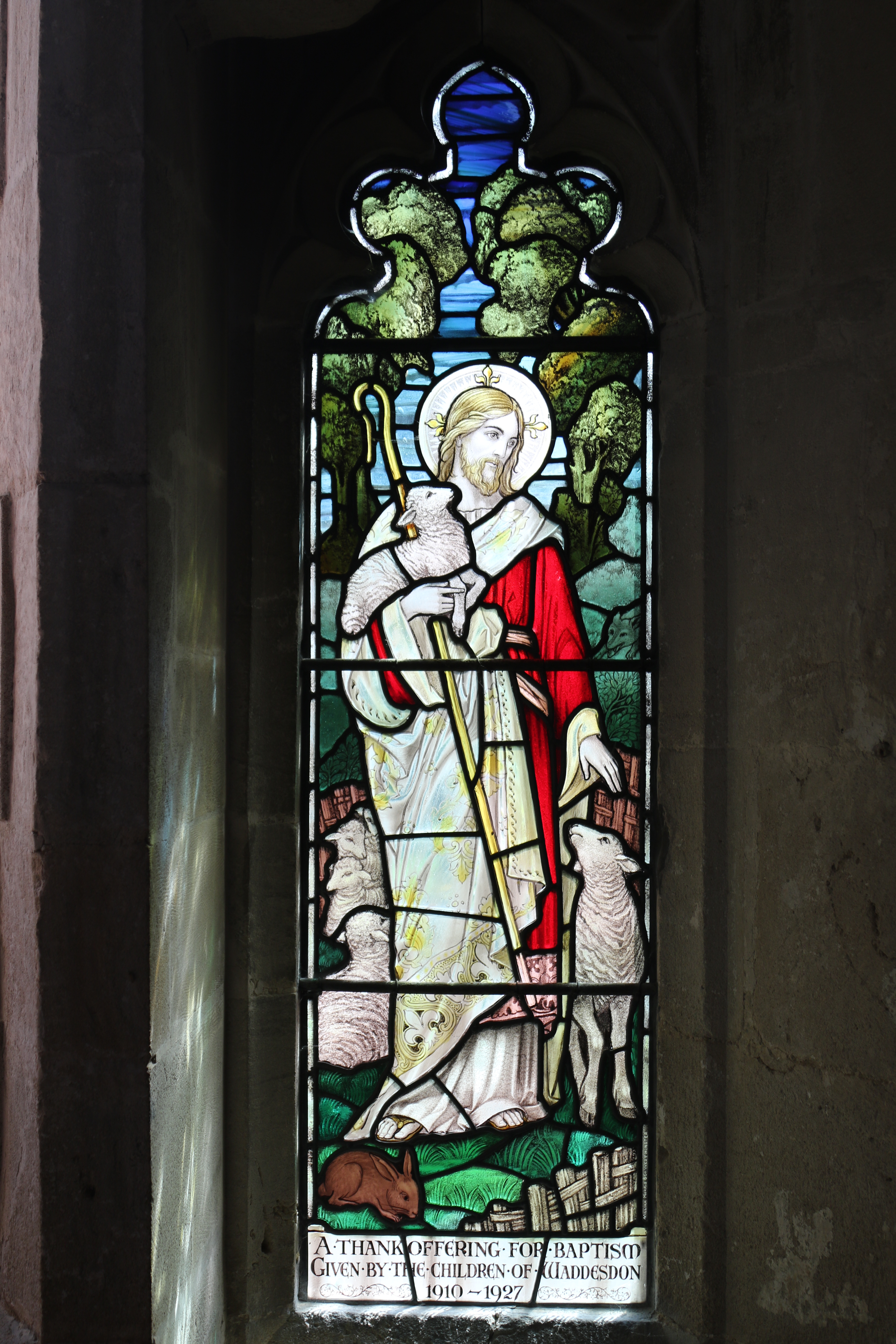
Baptistry window by Morris & Co.

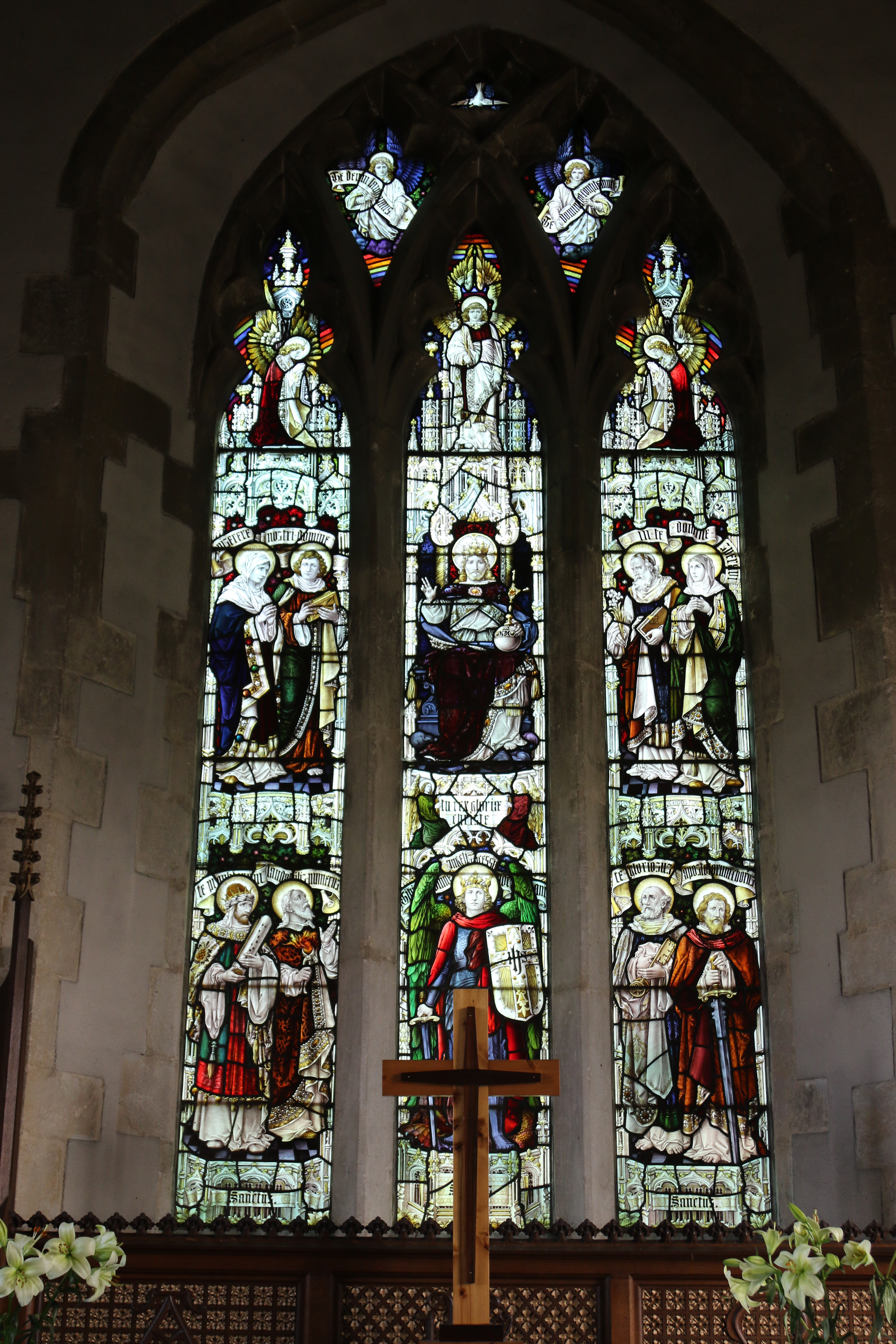
East window

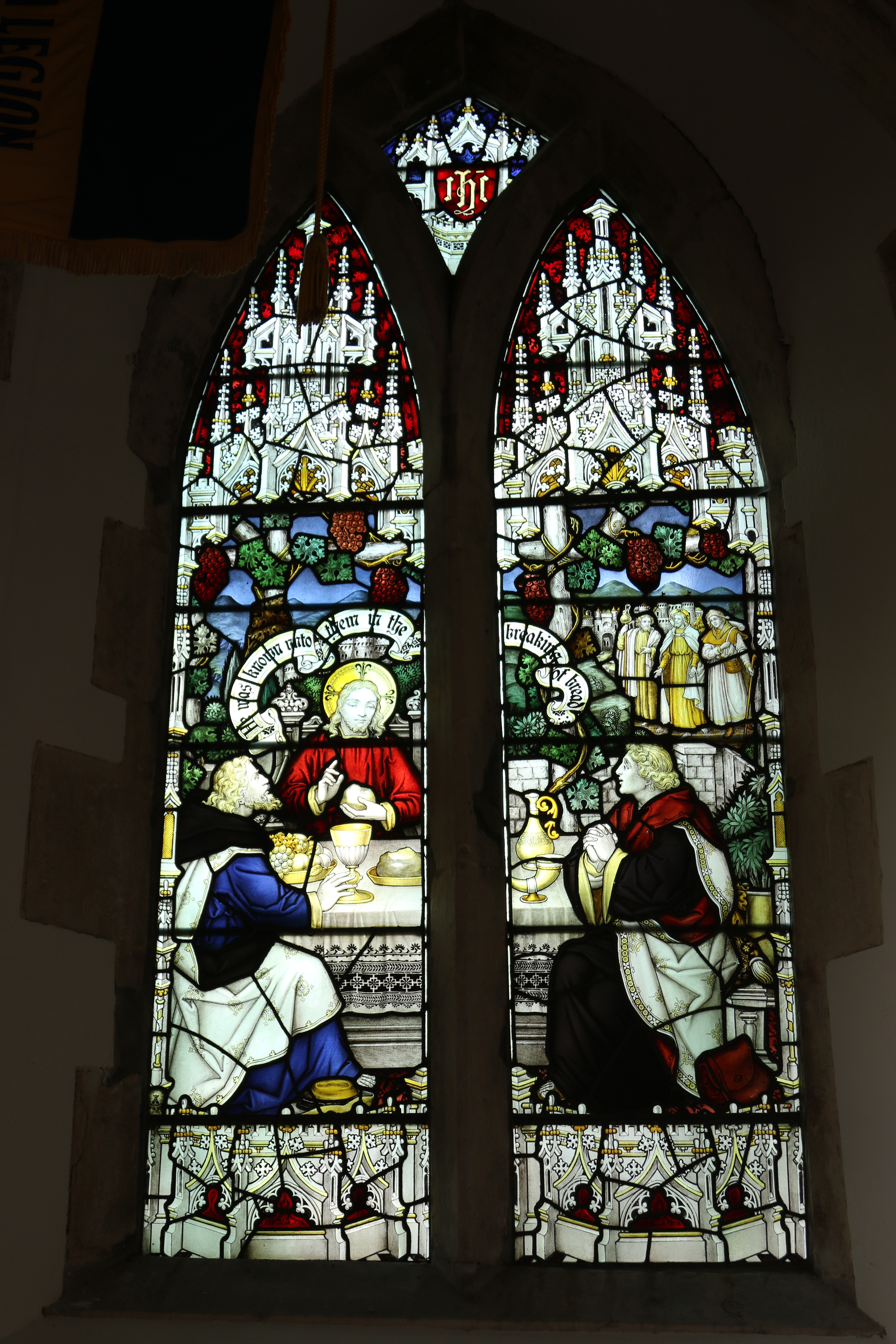
North aisle east window by Charles Eamer Kempe

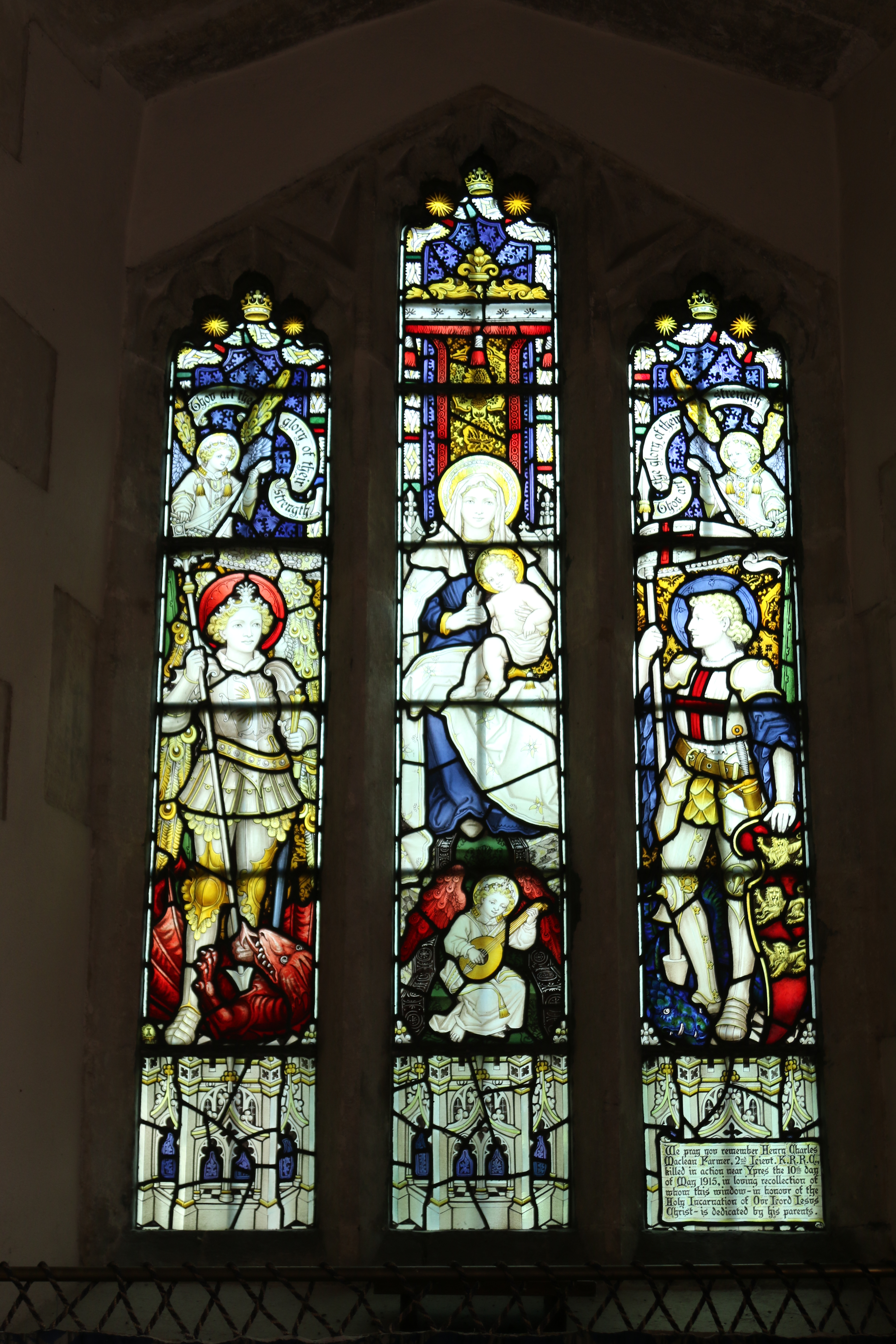
St Michael, the Virgin Mary and St George by Charles Eamer Kempe

== Organ ==
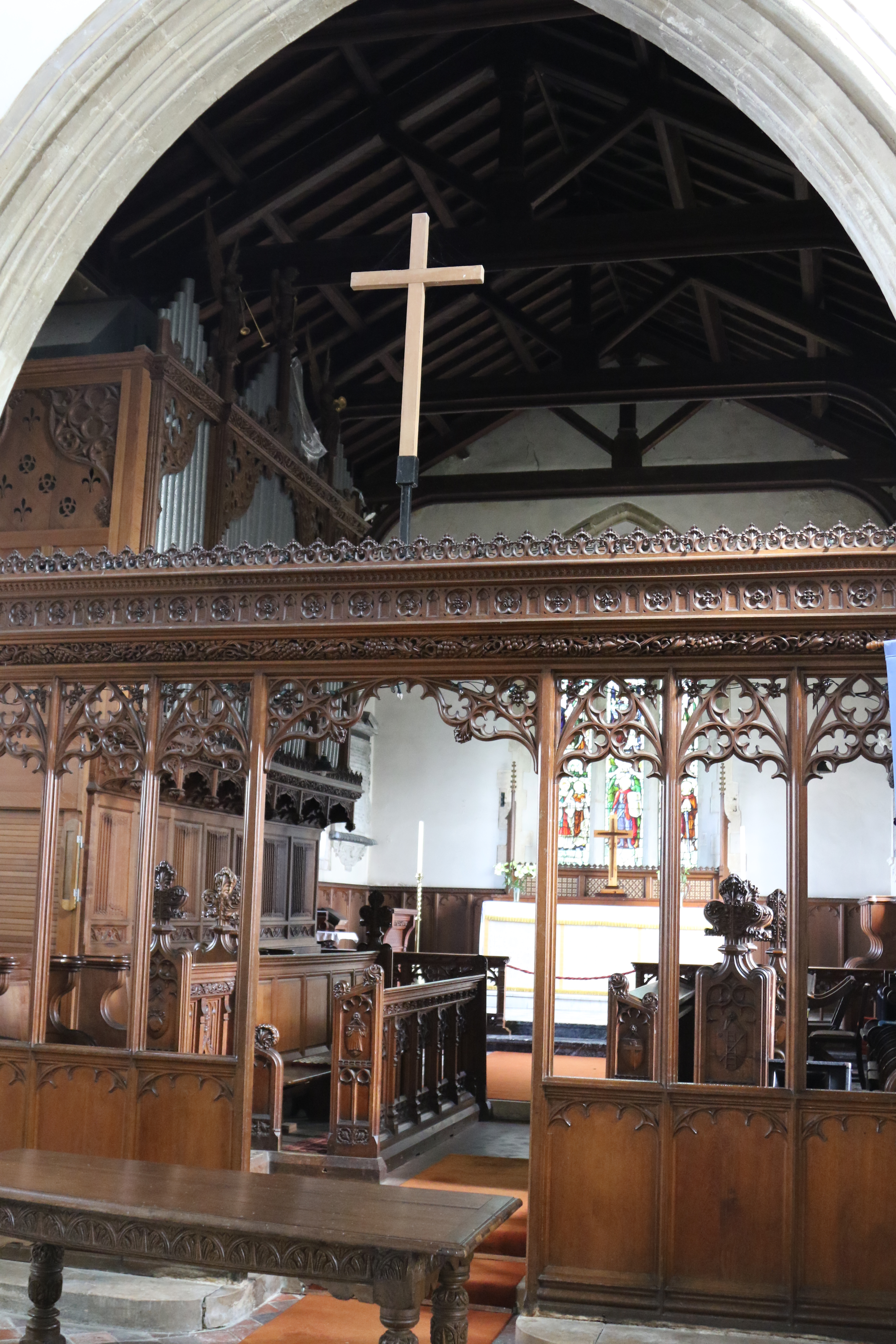
Chancel and organ

The pipe organ dates from 1913 and was built by William Hill & Sons. A specification of the organ can be found on the National Pipe Organ Register.
