= John Bigg (hermit) =

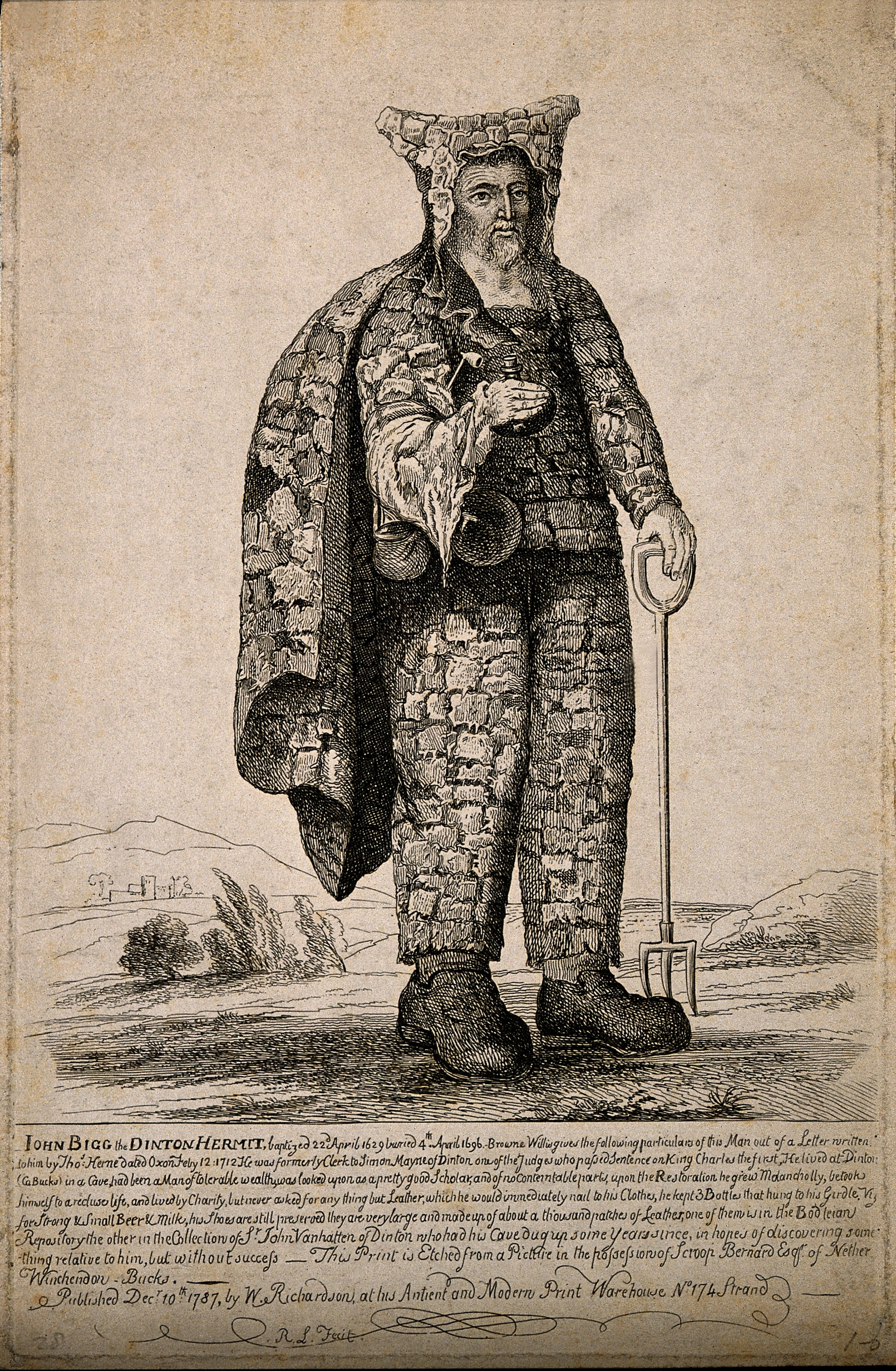
Etching of Bigg in his famous leather patched clothes, 1787

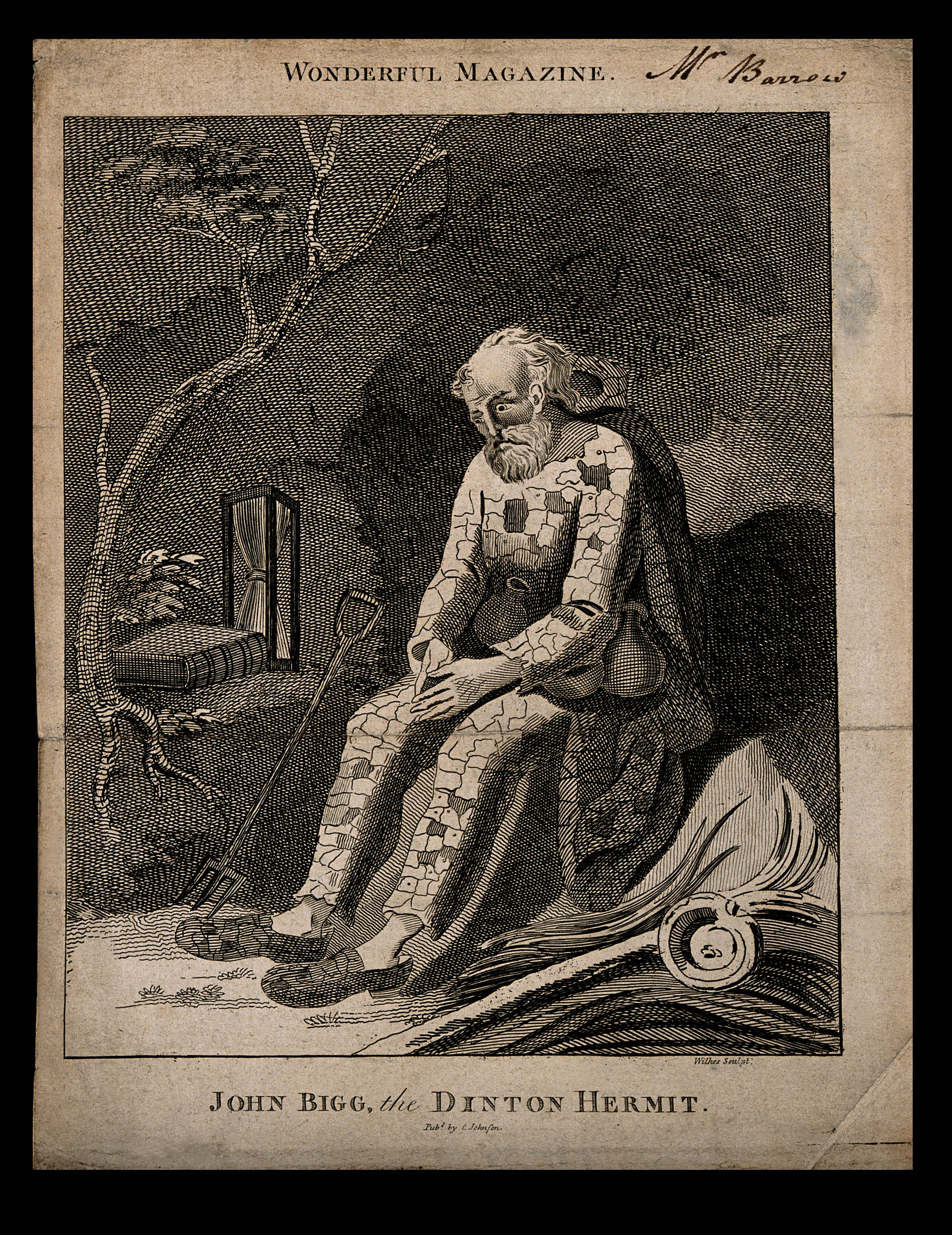
Line engraving of Bigg in his cave, 1793

John Bigg (bapt. 22 April 1629 – bur. 4 April 1696), also known as The Dinton Hermit, was a 17th-century English hermit.

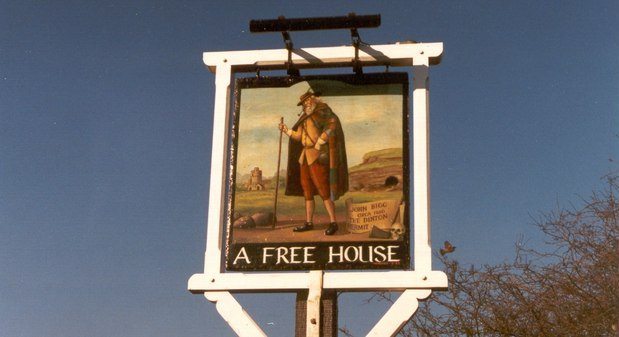
Bigg on a pub sign

Little is known about John Bigg as few people were involved in his life, being that he lived in obscurity. He is recorded as being baptised on 22 April 1629 and a 1712 letter of Thomas Hearne identifies him as the highly educated former clerk of Simon Mayne - a member of the long parliament, magistrate, and judge in the trial of King Charles I. Some sources even identify Bigg as a possible candidate for the executioner of Charles.

Upon the restoration of the English monarchy, Bigg's employer, Mayne, was tried and sentenced to death for regicide, but died in the Tower of London on 13 April 1661, before the sentence could be carried out. Bigg, either out of fear for his own life or despair at the state of his country, grew reclusive and took to living in a cave in Dinton, Buckinghamshire.

Bigg lived on a diet of meat, milk, ale and beer which was supplied to him from unasked charity of local people. He is said to have lived off charity but to only ask for gifts of leather, which he used to patch his boots and clothing, giving him his famous look of a patchwork of leather. His boots, massive with decades of tacked on leather, remain on display at the Ashmolean Museum in Oxford. Bigg was buried on 4 April 1696, in Dinton.
