= Dinton, Buckinghamshire =

Village in Buckinghamshire, England

Coordinates: 51.7835°N 0.8967°W

Dinton
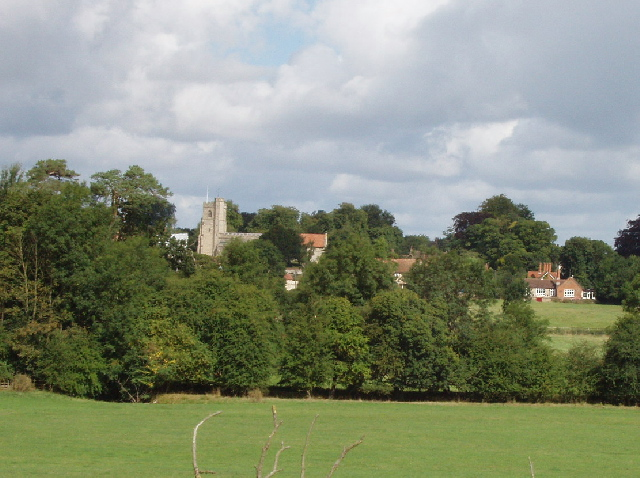
- Dinton from the south

- Location within Buckinghamshire
- Population: 809 (2011 Census)(civil parish)
- OS grid reference: SP7610
- Civil parish: Dinton with Ford and Upton
- Unitary authority: Buckinghamshire
- Ceremonial county: Buckinghamshire
- Region: South East
- Country: England
- Sovereign state: United Kingdom
- Police: Thames Valley
- Fire: Buckinghamshire
- Ambulance: South Central
- UK Parliament: Mid Buckinghamshire

Dinton is a village in Buckinghamshire, England, within the Buckinghamshire Council unitary authority area. It is in the south of the Aylesbury Vale on the ancient turnpike leading from Aylesbury to Thame (although this road has since been diverted away from the village). It is within the civil parish of Dinton with Ford and Upton. The village name is Anglo Saxon in origin, and means 'Dunna's estate'. In the Domesday Book of 1086 it was listed as Danitone.

== History ==
There was an ancient mansion house in this parish that belonged to the Mayne family for many years (they were lords of the manor in 1086). This has long since disappeared, but the groundworks of the ancient manor house still remain and are a goldmine of archaeological finds. There is also a ruined mock-fortified building, Dinton Castle also known as Dinton Folly, though this was constructed much later (in 1769) by Sir John Vanhattem. This octagonal folly or "sham castle" is a Grade II listed building.

A BBC article stated that the building was beside a Saxon burial ground. Another source indicates that over the past centuries, and into the 20th century, various artifacts and skeletons had been found near the structure. That report also states that there are 14 other listed buildings nearby, including Dinton Hall. A full restoration of the "castle" was completed in 2018.

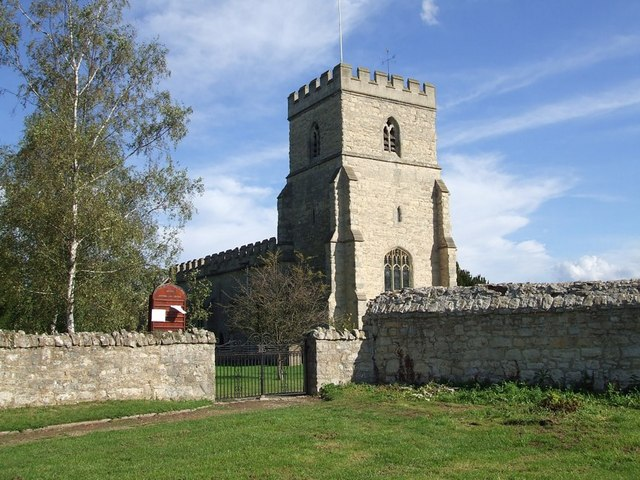
Church of St Peter and St Paul

The 12th-century parish church of Saints Peter and Paul is a grade I listed building. John Harrison was the vicar here and his only child Henrietta Tindal (c.1817–1879) was a noted poet and writer. There is a memorial to the Royal Navy navigation expert Henry Raper in the church.

Next to the church is Dinton Hall; this fine many-gabled mansion altered at various periods during its long history, was until the last quarter of the 20th century the seat of the Currie family and is now owned by the Vanbergen family. Following the Curries' departure it was bought by a Mr. Smith. He carried out a programme of restoration, and placed his own coat of arms above the mansion's portals. Since 2004 the mansion is owned by the Vanbergen family, and they have restored the mansion and brought in new facilities.

A notable resident of Dinton in the seventeenth century was John Biggs, the Dinton Hermit, who lived in a cave in the village. He was involved in the execution of King Charles I on 30 January 1649 and was reputed to have been the actual executioner. As one of the regicides, Simon Mayne, lived at Dinton, and was after his death in imprisonment buried at Dinton in 1661, it is possible that the executioner would have been given sanctuary and anonymity on one of the regicide's estates.

Within the parish border lay the hamlets of Westlington, Ford, Upton, Waldridge, Gibraltar and Aston Mullins.

There was also anciently a hamlet called Moreton in this parish, though today only the groundworks and ponds remain. This hamlet was wiped out sometime in the sixteenth century. The name mort / ton (death (fr) / town) could suggest that this settlement might have been wiped out and then subsequently abandoned after the inhabitants succumbed to the Black Death, but the usual derivation of the common name 'Moreton' is "town or settlement by a fen".

== Education ==
Cuddington and Dinton Church of England School is a mixed Church of England primary school. It is a voluntary aided school formed from the merger of Cuddington and Dinton schools. It takes children from the ages of four to eleven. It now has about 180 pupils.

== Sport ==
Dinton is home to Dinton Cricket club, who have three senior teams playing in the Home Counties Premier Cricket League and Cherwell League, as well as junior age group teams from under 9s to under 17s. Dinton CC also compete in the National Village Cup, reaching the semi-final stage in 2013 and 2014.
