= List of districts in Milton Keynes =

This is a list of the districts ('grid squares') of Milton Keynes, England. This list only includes settlements and business districts in its built-up-area. For a complete list of areas in the borough, see civil parishes in the City of Milton Keynes.

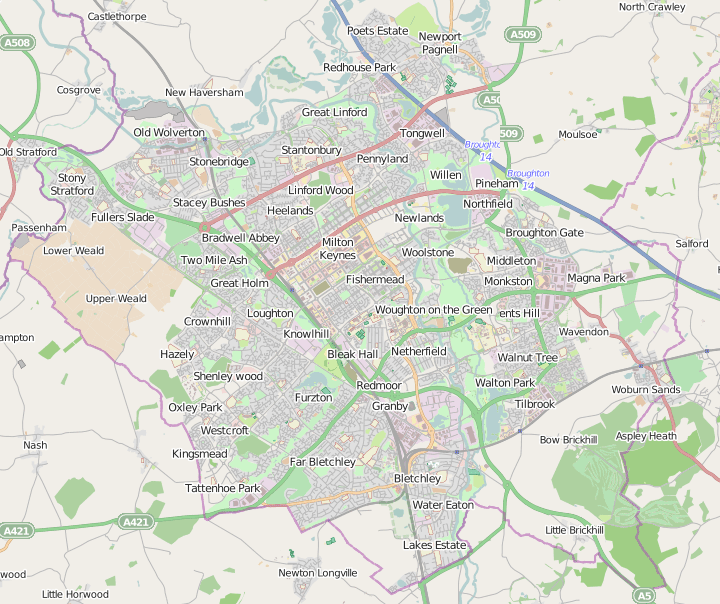
OpenStreetMap mapping of Milton Keynes, showing most of the districts

Click on marker beside "Name" or "Civil Parish" to sort into desired order.
There are no roads V0 and H0: these co-ordinates indicate that a district lies west/north of V1/H1 and to its own west/north has no grid street.

East of	South of	Name	Civil Parish
V4	H3	Two Mile Ash	Abbey Hill
V5	H3	Wymbush	Abbey Hill
V4	H2	Kiln Farm	Abbey Hill
Outside grid		Central Bletchley	Bletchley and Fenny Stratford
V6	H9	Denbigh North	Bletchley and Fenny Stratford
Outside grid		Denbigh West	Bletchley and Fenny Stratford
V7	A5	Denbigh East	Bletchley and Fenny Stratford
Outside grid		Brickfields	Bletchley and Fenny Stratford
Outside grid		Water Eaton	Bletchley and Fenny Stratford
Outside grid		Eaton Manor	Bletchley and Fenny Stratford
Outside grid		Fenny Stratford	Bletchley and Fenny Stratford
V7	A5	Mount Farm	Bletchley and Fenny Stratford
V4	H8	Granby	West Bletchley
Outside grid		Denbigh Hall	West Bletchley
Outside grid		Newton Leys	West Bletchley
Outside grid		Old Bletchley	West Bletchley
Outside grid		Far Bletchley	West Bletchley
Outside grid		West Bletchley	West Bletchley
A5	H3	Bradwell	Bradwell
V6	H3	Heelands	Bradwell
A5	H4	Rooksley	Bradwell
V6	H4	Bradwell Common	Bradwell
A5	H3	Bradwell Abbey	Bradwell
V6	H1	New Bradwell	New Bradwell
V11	H6	Broughton and Brooklands	Broughton
V11	H4	Pineham	Broughton
V7	H6	Fishermead	Campbell Park
V6	H6	Oldbrook	Campbell Park
A5	H6	Winterhill	Campbell Park
V8	H6	Springfield	Campbell Park
V9	H6	Woolstone	Campbell Park
V10	H5	Willen Lake	Campbell Park
V9	H5	Newlands	Campbell Park
V10	H4	Willen	Campbell Park
V8	H5	Campbell Park	Central Milton Keynes
V6	H5	Central Milton Keynes	Central Milton Keynes
V3	H1	Fairfields (Note: Not in original designated area but subsequent expansion has grown to include it.)	Fairfields
V8	H1	Great Linford	Great Linford
V9	H1	Giffard Park	Great Linford
V10	H1	Blakelands	Great Linford
V9	H3	Bolbeck Park	Great Linford
V7	H4	Conniburrow	Great Linford
V8	H4	Downs Barn	Great Linford
V9	H4	Downhead Park	Great Linford
V8	H3	Neath Hill	Great Linford
V9	H3	Pennylands	Great Linford
V10	H3	Tongwell	Great Linford
V9	H4	Willen Park	Great Linford
V10	H8	Kents Hill	Kents Hill and Monkston
V11	H7	Kingston	Kents Hill and Monkston
V10	H7	Monkston	Kents Hill and Monkston
V11	H8	Brinklow	Kents Hill and Monkston
V4	H7	Elfield Park	Loughton and Great Holm
V4	H5	Loughton	Loughton and Great Holm
V5	H4	Loughton Lodge	Loughton and Great Holm
V4	H4	Great Holm	Loughton and Great Holm
V4	H6	Knowlhill	Loughton and Great Holm
V4	H7	National Bowl	Loughton and Great Holm
V10	H6	Middleton incl. Milton Keynes Village	Milton Keynes
V11	H6	Atterbury	Milton Keynes
Outside grid		Brook Furlong	Milton Keynes
V10	H5	Fox Milne	Milton Keynes
V11	H5	Northfield	Milton Keynes
V9	H6	Oakgrove	Milton Keynes
Outside grid		Newport Pagnell	Newport Pagnell
V2	H6	Shenley Brook End	Shenley Brook End
V3	H7	Furzton	Shenley Brook End
V3	H6	Shenley Lodge	Shenley Brook End
V2	H7	Emerson Valley	Shenley Brook End
V0	H6	Kingsmead	Shenley Brook End
V0	H7	Snelshall	Shenley Brook End
V1	H7	Tattenhoe	Shenley Brook End
V0	H7	Tattenhoe Park	Shenley Brook End
V1	H6	Westcroft	Shenley Brook End
V3	H4	Crownhill	Shenley Church End
V2	H4	Grange Farm	Shenley Church End
V1	H4	Hazeley	Shenley Church End
V3	H5	Shenley Church End	Shenley Church End
V2	H5	Medbourne	Shenley Church End
V1	H5	Oxley	Shenley Church End
V1	H5	Woodhill	Shenley Church End
V7	H9	Ashland	Simpson
V6	H9	West Ashland	Simpson
V8	H9	Simpson	Simpson
V5	H2	Bancroft	Stantonbury
V5	H2	Bancroft Park	Stantonbury
V5	H1	Blue Bridge	Stantonbury
V6	H2	Bradville	Stantonbury
V7	H3	Linford Wood	Stantonbury
V7	H1	Oakridge Park	Stantonbury
V7	H2	Stantonbury	Stantonbury
V3	H0	Stony Stratford	Stony Stratford
V4	H1	Fullers Slade	Stony Stratford
V4	H0	Galley Hill	Stony Stratford
V10	H10	Brown's Wood	Walton
V9	H10	Caldecotte	Walton
V11	H10	Old Farm Park	Walton
V10	H10	Tilbrook	Walton
V10	H9	Walnut Tree	Walton
V11	H9	Tower Gate	Walton
V9	H9	Walton	Walton
V9	H8	Walton Hall	Walton
V9	H9	Walton Park	Walton
V11	H9	Wavendon Gate	Walton
Outside grid		Eagle Farm North	Wavendon
Outside grid		Eagle Farm South	Wavendon
Outside grid		Glebe Farm	Wavendon
Outside grid		Magna Park	Wavendon
V11	H9	Wavendon	Wavendon
V3	H3	Whitehouse	Whitehouse
Outside grid		Woburn Sands	Woburn Sands
V4	H1	Greenleys	Wolverton and Greenleys
V5	H1	Stonebridge	Wolverton and Greenleys
V5	H1	Wolverton	Wolverton and Greenleys
V5	H0	Old Wolverton	Wolverton and Greenleys
V5	H2	Stacey Bushes	Wolverton and Greenleys
V4	H2	Hodge Lea	Wolverton and Greenleys
V4	H0	Wolverton Mill	Wolverton and Greenleys
V6	H8	Beanhill	Woughton
V5	H7	Bleak Hall	Woughton
V6	H7	Coffee Hall	Woughton
V7	H7	Eaglestone	Woughton
V6	H7	Leadenhall	Woughton
V7	H8	Netherfield	Woughton
V8	H7	Peartree Bridge	Woughton
V5	H8	Redmoor	Woughton
V8	H8	Tinkers Bridge	Woughton
V8	H8	Passmore	Old Woughton
V9	H7	Woughton on the Green	Old Woughton
V9	H9	Woughton Park	Old Woughton
