= Sport in Milton Keynes =

Sport in Milton Keynes covers a range of professional and amateur sport in the City of Milton Keynes unitary authority area. In 2019, Milton Keynes was officially designated as a European City of Sport for 2020. There are professional teams in football (MK Dons), in motorsport (Red Bull Racing) and in ice hockey (MK Lightning). The National Badminton Centre, and the Marshall Milton Keynes Athletic Club train professional and amateur athletes. Most other sports feature at amateur level although there are semi-professional teams in rugby union and football among other sports. There is an international-standard karting track owned by Daytona Motorsport.

== Archery ==
There are archery clubs in Newport Pagnell and Shenley/Loughton.

== Armwrestling ==
Milton Keynes Armwrestling club has produced some of the best in the country: in 2011 it came away from the British championships with 1st place left&right 110 kg+ class, 1st place left&right 75 kg class and 2nd place left&right in the 80 kg class.

== Athletics ==
Marshall Milton Keynes AC is one of England's leading Athletic clubs. Their members include Olympic, World, Commonwealth and European Champion, Greg Rutherford, and Olympians Craig Pickering and Mervyn Luckwell

=== Running ===
The "Milton Keynes Festival of Running" is held in March every year, attracting thousands of runners onto the streets of Milton Keynes. The Milton Keynes Marathon is held annually, as are a number of other running events throughout the year, such as the South of England Road Relays, the Wolverton 5 and the Milton Keynes 10k race, organised by Marshall Milton Keynes AC. Events such as The Color Run or the Race for Life are also held frequently.

== Badminton ==
With the National Badminton Centre located in Loughton just across the A5 from Central Milton Keynes, badminton is an important sport locally. A number of clubs are based at the centre, and there are also open sessions during the week. Badminton clubs also meet at other centres such as Stantonbury and Shenley.

== Baseball ==
Founded in 1986, Milton Keynes Baseball Club (Milton Keynes Bucks) is one of the oldest baseball clubs in the UK. Single-A National champions in 2010 and Triple-A Midlands Division champions in 2013. In 2022, the club is fielding 3 teams in the BBF (British Baseball Federation) Triple-A league and in the East of England Baseball League Double-A and Single-A divisions. Their ballpark is located in Woughton on the Green.

== Basketball ==
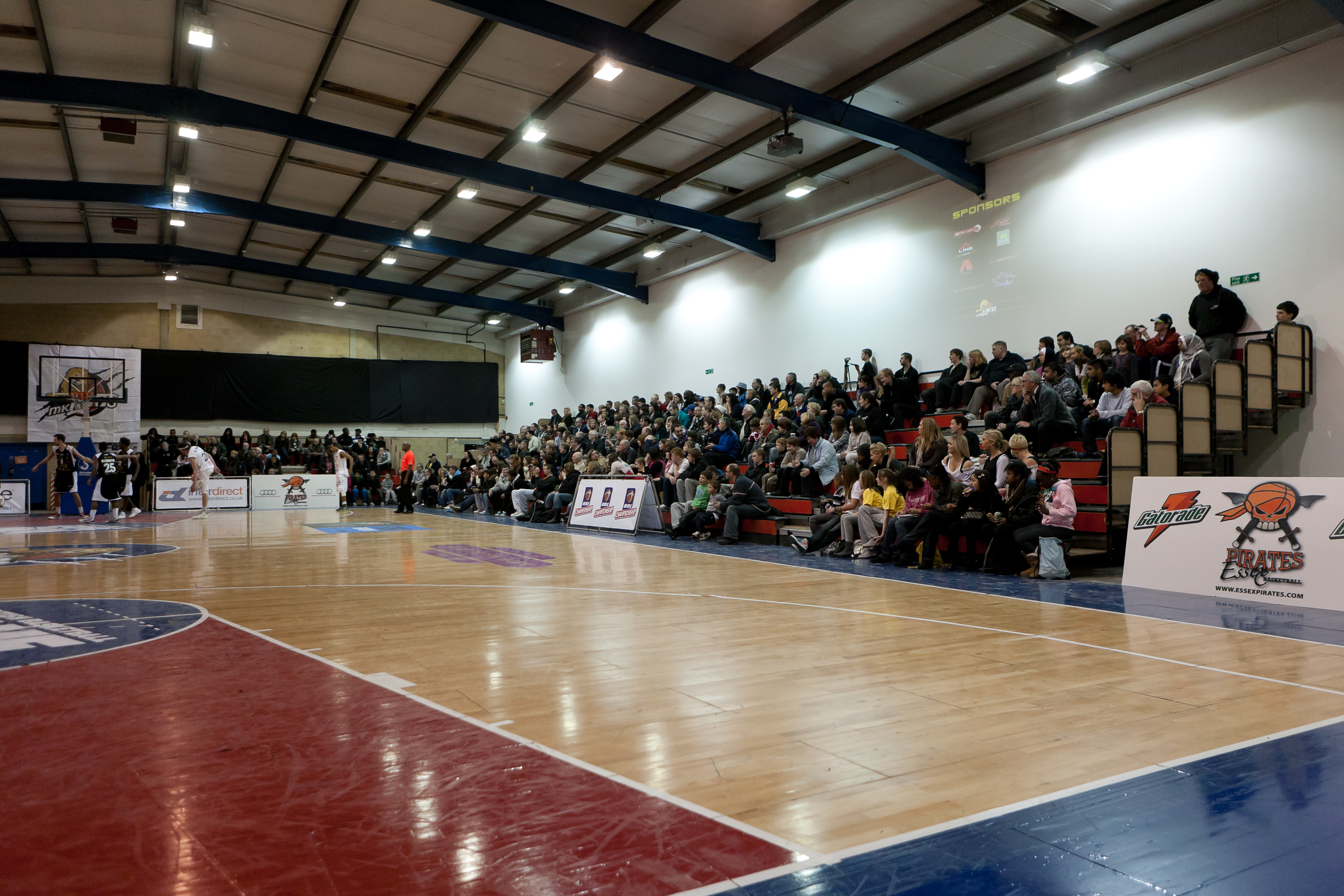
The Milton Keynes Lions played in MK from 1998 to 2012 before moving to London. They resided at the MK Lions Arena for their final three years in Buckinghamshire.

Milton Keynes originally hosted basketball during the early years of the National League, they took over the successful Embassy All-Stars franchise during the 1976–77 National Basketball League season. The team finished National runners-up in both league and cup competitions before disbanding after the 1978–79 season.

Milton Keynes hosted basketball again between 1998 and 2012 before the MK Lions were forced to re-locate after the closure of Prestige Homes Arena and no suitable alternative for hosting professional games in the city was found. In addition to the Lions British Basketball League team, the franchise established a ladies team, youth teams at all age groups and the Milton Keynes College Lions basketball academy.

In 2022, Milton Keynes Breakers joined the National Basketball League.

== Bowls ==
There are a number of lawn bowls clubs in the Borough. These include Bletchley BC, Newport Pagnell Lawn Bowls, Olney BC, Bradwell BC, Stony Stratford BC and Wolverton Park BC.

Established in 1889, Wolverton Park Bowls Club is the oldest Bowls Club in Buckinghamshire.

== Cricket ==
- Milton Keynes CC is based in Milton Keynes Village and plays in the Morrant Four Counties Cricket League.
- Milton Keynes City CC is based in Woughton on the Green and plays in the Morrant Four Counties Cricket League.
- Bletchley Town CC is based at Manor Fields, Fenny Stratford and play in the Cherwell Cricket League. For a brief time they were known as Milton Keynes Park CC (formed 2003) and were based at Campbell Park. It won the Buckinghamshire Senior Cup in 2004.
- Stony Stratford CC is based at Ostlers Lane, Stony Stratford and play in the Premier Division of the Northamptonshire Cricket League.
- Shenley Church End CC are also based at Manor Fields, Fenny Stratford and play in the Morrant Four Counties Cricket League.

== Cycling ==
Team Milton Keynes and North Bucks Road Club are the leading clubs for racing cyclists, with Team MK also incorporating Triathlon and Duathlon as well as Mountain Biking. Milton Keynes Cycling Association also holds circuit racing at the Bowl.

In September 2008 Milton Keynes played host to the Race Headquarters for The Tour of Britain in the buildup to the race. Stage Two of the race began in front of Milton Keynes Central railway station, before heading to Newbury.

== Fencing ==
Milton Keynes Fencing Club meet regularly in Oakgrove School and is one of the oldest sports teams in Milton Keynes having been founded in 1978 and has actively competed for much of that time in the Three Counties Fencing League which covers Bedfordshire, Buckinghamshire, and Hertfordshire. Whilst all three weapons are welcome, the main focus is on épée and sabre.

== Fishing ==
Fishing is a popular sport: with its miles of river and canal bank and its balancing lakes, Milton Keynes is a favoured location for anglers.

== Floorball ==
The local floorball club has currently several teams, including a national side under the name MK Phantoms, women's teams and a junior side.

== Football ==
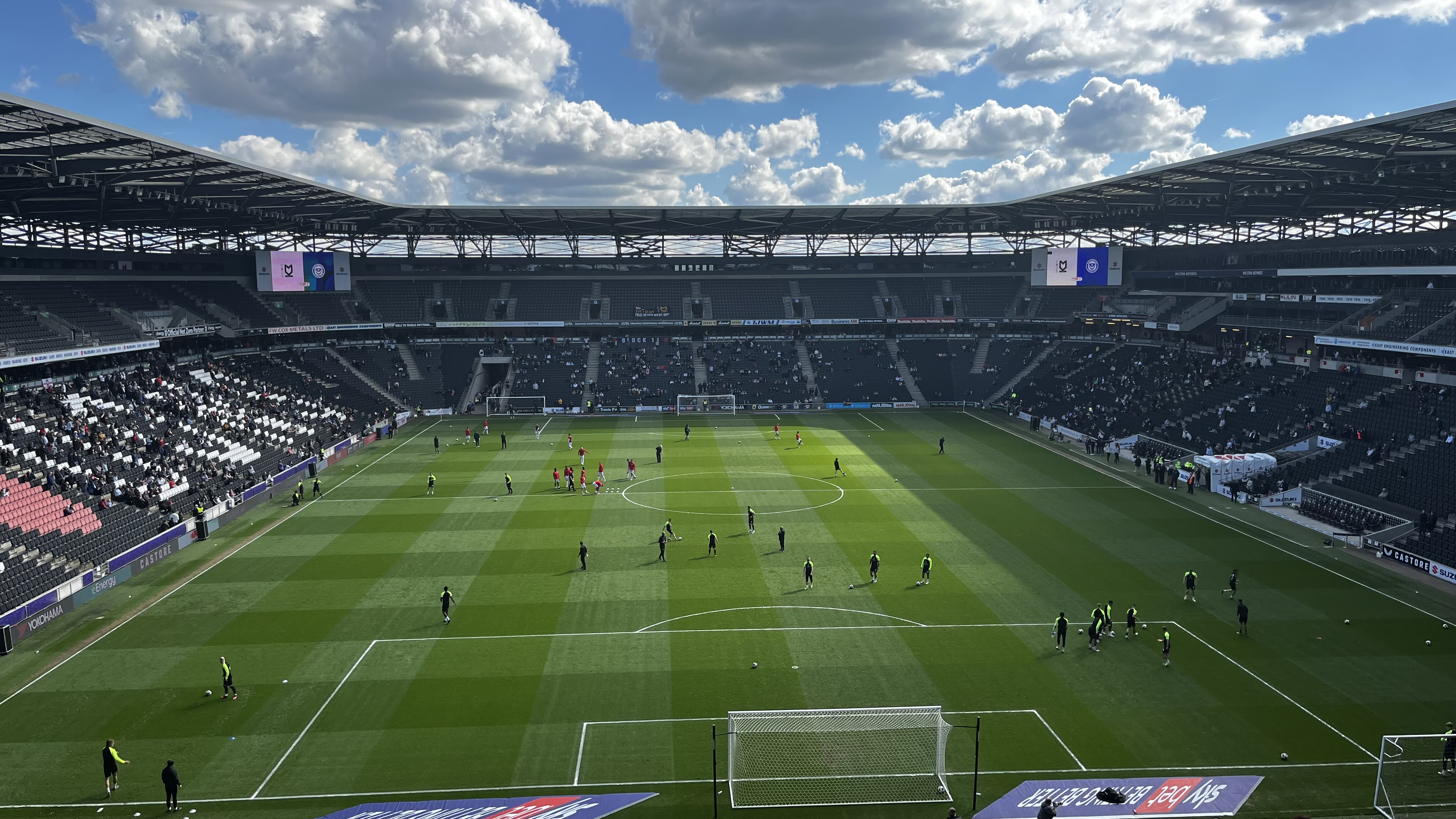
Milton Keynes Dons F.C. pre-game practicing at Stadium MK

=== League ===
The only Football League team based in Milton Keynes is Milton Keynes Dons F.C. The team is based at Stadium MK in Denbigh and, plays in EFL League Two

=== Non-League ===
==== Notable active non-league clubs ====
The better known non-League clubs in the borough include:

- Milton Keynes Irish are members of the Southern League Division One Central].
- New Bradwell St Peter are members of the Spartan South Midlands League Division One
- Newport Pagnell Town – "The Swans" are currently members of the United Counties League Premier Division South
- Stony Stratford are members of the Spartan South Midlands League Division Two
- Old Bradwell United – are members of the Spartan South Midlands League.

The North Bucks & District Football League and Sunday league football attract many smaller teams, which are too numerous to list individually.

Under 7's to under 18's play in the Milton Keynes and District Development League.

==== Notable former non-League clubs ====
- Bletchley Town F.C. were members of the Spartan South Midlands League. After being refounded in 2005, the club only managed to survive nine more years before folding.
- Bletchley LMS were a local team founded in 1947, which folded in 1960
- Bletchley BBOB were founded in 1952, playing until 1957 when it changed its name to Bletchley United before eventually folding in 1976
- Loughton Orient was a football club based in Loughton founded as Abbey National F.C., they joined the South Midlands League Division One in 1994 but were disbanded in 2007.
- Milton Keynes City F.C., following the demise of the Milton Keynes Borough F.C., Manor Fields in Fenny Stratford was home to the "new MKCFC" playing in the South Midlands Premier Division. They are defunct as a senior football club since mid 2003. This name has been used by at least two clubs—in the first instance Bletchley Town became Milton Keynes City in 1974 before being wound up in 1985, then Mercedes-Benz assumed the name from 1998 to 2003. In the years before their demise, the second incarnation of the team reached the Premier Division of the Spartan South Midlands League. The name is associated solely for junior football.
- Milton Keynes Robins F.C. were founded in 1883 as Buckingham Town F.C. Based at Manor Fields in Fenny Stratford from 2012, they played in the United Counties Football League, switching to the Spartan South Midlands Football League in 2018 and changing name to Milton Keynes Robins in January 2019. In 2020 they merged with Unite MK to form Milton Keynes Irish (see active clubs above).
- Unite MK F.C. were founded in 2004 as Wolverton Town F.C. and played at Manor Fields in Fenny Stratford. They reached the Spartan South Midlands Football League in 2012 and changed name to Unite MK in 2016. In 2020 they merged with Milton Keynes Robins to form Milton Keynes Irish (see active clubs above).
- Wolverton A.F.C., the oldest club in the area folded, were re-instigated, but are in abeyance. In the years before going into administration, they reached the Premier Division of the Spartan South Midlands League. Until 2011, it had the oldest (and almost certainly the first) football stand and at one point in the club's history it had the longest name of any football club in the United Kingdom—"Newport Pagnell & Wolverton London & North Western Railway Amalgamated Association Football Club".

=== Six a side football ===
Milton Keynes is also home to many five and six-a-side football leagues.

== Golf ==
There are courses at Abbey Hill (Two Mile Ash), West Bletchley and Wavendon. Just outside the city, there are courses in Aspley Guise, Soulbury and Woburn.

== Handball ==
MK Olycats were a handball team founded by Great Britain men's national handball team player and Olympian Bobby White. The club plays in the Midlands Regional Development League, one division below the top tier, the Super 8. The club has now moved to Stoke-Mandeville under the name Bucks Bullets.

== Hockey ==
There are many all-weather pitches throughout Milton Keynes – most of which are within school grounds, including the two pitches at Stantonbury. There are also two water based pitches at Woughton on the Green, which is the home ground of Milton Keynes Men's and Women's Hockey club. Teams from Milton Keynes Hockey Club compete at many levels in leagues covering the South East of England.

== Ice hockey ==
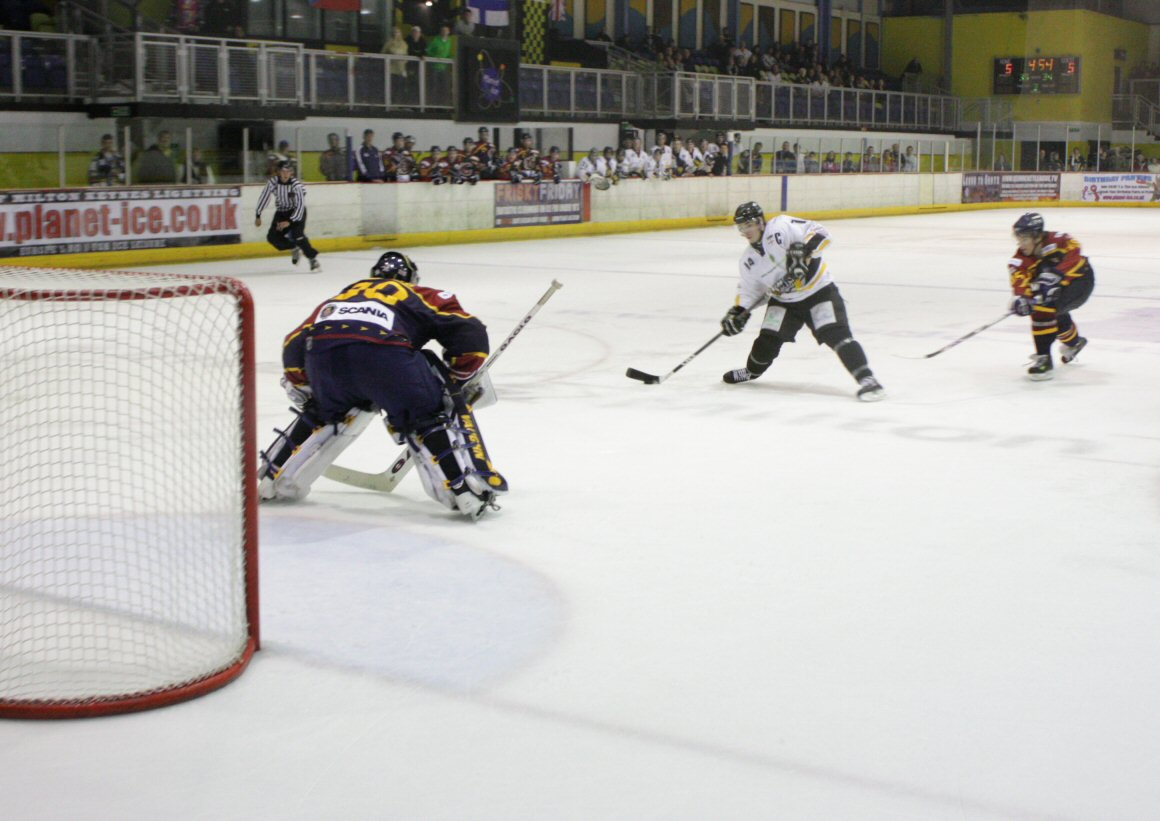
Milton Keynes ice hockey clubs Thunder and Lightning (2008 image) have played at Planet Ice Milton Keynes since their foundations in 2001 and 2002 respectively.

The town has two semi-professional ice hockey teams, these being Milton Keynes Lightning (founded in 2002) of the NIHL and Milton Keynes Thunder (founded in 2001) of the NIHL 1. Both teams play at the 2,500 capacity Planet Ice Arena which is situated close to Milton Keynes Central railway station. The town also used to be home to professional team Milton Keynes Kings from 1990 to 1996 and 1998–2002 who played at the same arena, although during 1990–1996 it was known as the bladerunner arena. There are also a number of junior, ladies and recreational adult teams who also play at the arena.

== Korfball ==
Milton Keynes Bucks founded in 2004, and Milton Keynes Lakers, founded in 2012 as merger of several local clubs, are the two significant korfball teams in the area.

== Martial arts ==
This popular family of sports/traditional arts has clubs in each of the six major disciplines (aikido, jujutsu, judo, karate, taekwondo and tai chi).

Milton Keynes is the home to the central region of Minakami Bushido Karate Dojo, which practices Shotokan Karate. The club has classes aimed at 4-7yr olds known as the Tiny Tigers, then main classes which students of any age can attended, meaning children and adults train together. There are lessons most days at various leisure centres across Milton Keynes, including Shenley and Stantonbury leisure centres. Lessons and gradings are structured around Khion, Kata, Kumite, weapons training and conditioning to improve strength, control, fitness and co-ordination.

== Motorsport ==
=== Formula 1 ===
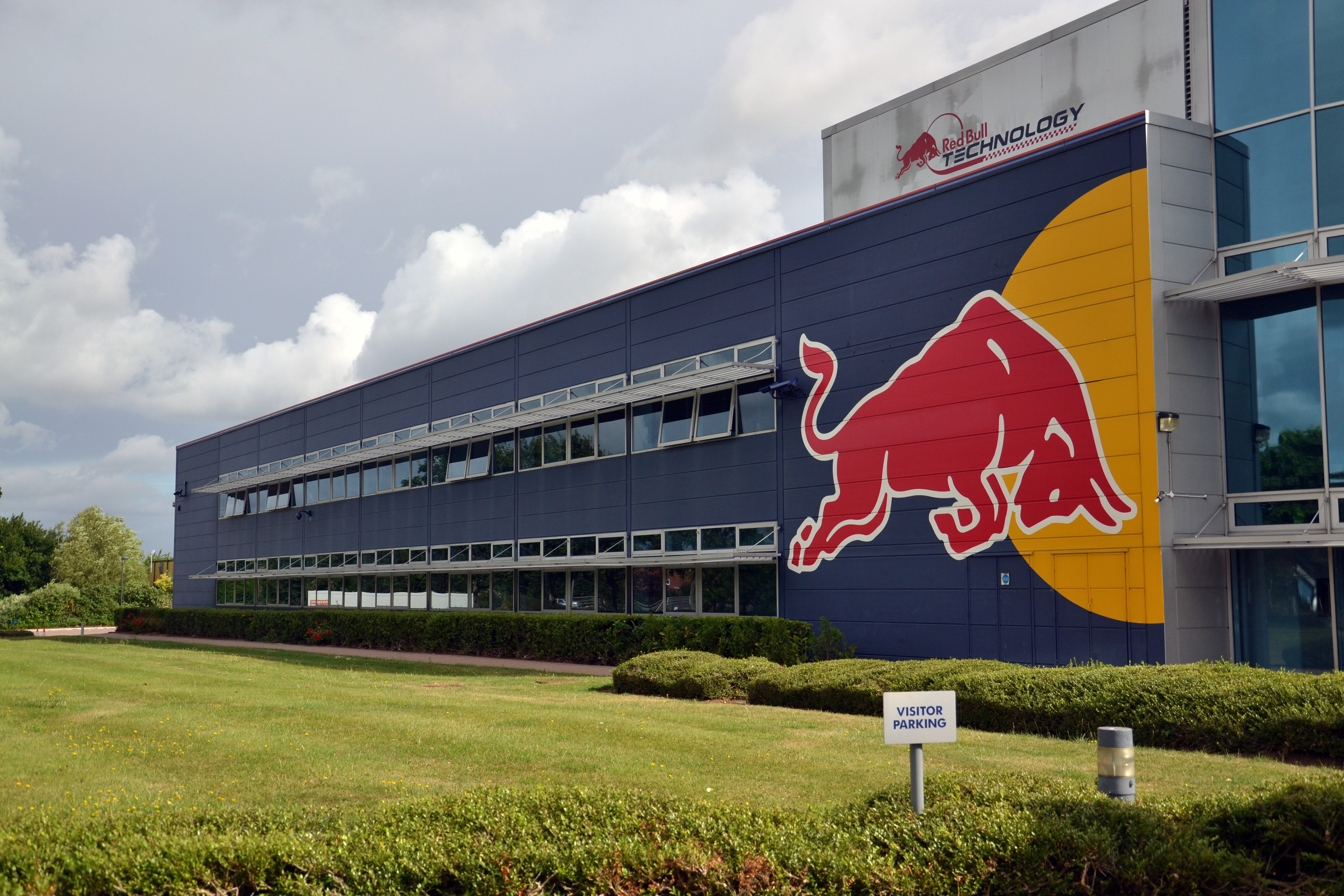
F1 team Red Bull Racing have their HQ in MK.

Most notably, the Red Bull Racing Formula One team is based here, in Tilbrook. Red Bulls' other F1 team Visa Cash App Racing Bulls have an aerodynamics facility in Milton Keynes. Previous notable though defunct teams included Arrows, Brabham, Stewart Grand Prix and Jaguar F1.

=== Endurance Racing ===
LMGT3 class European Le Mans Series team GR Racing are based in Milton Keynes.

=== Karting ===
Daytona Motorsport opened a karting venue in Milton Keynes in 1996. The venue has three circuits, ranging from a 1,360 metres (4,460 ft)-long international circuit to a 375 metres (1,230 ft) north circuit.

=== Motorcycle Speedway ===
Until the late 1990s, MK had a speedway team, the Milton Keynes Knights. Speedway was staged at Milton Keynes at two venues, Milton Keynes Greyhound Stadium at Ashland and then Elfield Park beside the National Bowl. Both sites have closed: the former is now a housing district and the latter is a brownfield site.

== Parkour ==
Milton Keynes boasts a growing Parkour or freerunning movement. Due to its urban landscape, the Central Milton Keynes area is an ideal area for parkour activity.

== Pool ==
There are five long established leagues which cover the borough: Bletchley Friendly, Milton Keynes Clubs, Milton Keynes Sunday, Milton Keynes Tuesday and Newport Pagnell. Two current Interleague teams exist, Milton Keynes 'A' and MK Shooters (Formerly Milton Keynes 'B'), which have dominated the Buckinghamshire Interleague since its reformation in 2003. Milton Keynes has also provided the backbone of the Buckinghamshire County squad since the early 1990s due to the town being the long time base of the Buckinghamshire County Pool Association, although BCPA currently play from and are based in Leighton Buzzard in Bedfordshire.

== Rowing ==
Milton Keynes Rowing Club operates out of Caldecotte Lake.

The club was founded in 1995 and hosted the inaugural annual Milton Keynes Regatta on 22 May 2010.

== Rugby League ==
Milton Keynes Wolves RLFC was a short-lived rugby league team established in 2012, playing in the East Men's League.

== Rugby Union ==
=== Local teams ===
The major Borough clubs are Bletchley RUFC, Milton Keynes RUFC and Olney RFC.

==== Bletchley RUFC ====
Bletchley Rugby Club, who play at Manor Fields, routinely put out three Senior XVs, a ladies side and a Vets side. The 1st XV play in South West 1 East (level 6) and the 2nd XVs in the Berks, Bucks & Oxon 2 North table. The 3rd XV and Vets side play ad hoc friendly local fixtures.

Bletchley Ladies is a developing team which is intending to enter the RFUW leagues in the 2011 season.

In addition to the 120+ adult section, the club has a Youth (U7s to U17s) set-up with over 200 members. In the 2005/06 season the club's U17 squad were Buckinghamshire County Cup champions, and finalists in the South West Division Bowl.

The playing activities at Bletchley are supported by a large number of volunteers, including the 50+ vice-presidents of whom many are ex-players. Bletchley celebrated its 60th anniversary during the 2007/08 season.

In 2003 Bletchley RUFC were the first sports organisation in Milton Keynes/North Bucks to gain the Rugby Football Union 'Seal of Approval' and Sport England Clubmark. In 2006 the club gained Stage 2 accreditation from the same bodies.

==== Milton Keynes RUFC ====
Milton Keynes RUFC began as Wolverton RUFC but changed its name in 1973, based in Greenleys. In April 2011, the club transferred to a new ground in Emerson Valley. The move was opposed by the local community, but planning permission was granted on 6 September 2007.

In March 2006, Milton Keynes RUFC won the Bucks Plate against Slough RUFC who are in the league above. Milton Keynes went on to finish as runners up in the Berks, Bucks and Oxon Premier League and were promoted to Southern Counties North. The club has over 400 members including a mini and junior section with players between the ages of 6 and 18.

==== Olney RFC ====
Olney has for many years been a rugby town with its rugby team dating back from 1877, called Olney Rugby Football Club, which has four regular senior teams. They also cater for Colts rugby, women's rugby and mini rugby. The club holds many social events for the town, one of these being a Rugby 7's tournament, with competitors coming from all over the country. Olney's Rugby is of a high standard in amateur rugby, winning the Lewis Shield in 2007, the Southern Counties North League in 2008 and the Bucks County Cup in 2010. Olney 1st XV play in the South West 1 East (level 6) league.

Olney Women's team compete in the RFUW National Championship.

=== Other teams ===
Despite having no Premiership teams, Milton Keynes has previously hosted home games for Northampton Saints and Saracens F.C. at Stadium MK.

==== Premiership ====
Saracens F.C. were the first club to host a rugby match at Stadium MK when Bristol visited on 10 May 2008, providing a grand stage for Rugby World Cup 2003 winner Richard Hill's 288th and last appearance for the men in black. A last-minute try from Kameli Ratuvou ensured Hill's 15-year club career finished on a winning note.

==== The Heineken Cup ====
On 24 January 2011, the Northampton Saints Rugby union club announced that their 2010–11 Heineken Cup quarter final match against Ulster Rugby would take place at Stadium MK, because their Franklin's Gardens ground is too small to meet the minimum 15,000 seats demanded by the organisers.

The Saints had previously indicated that they might play future major games at Stadium MK as their proposal to expand Franklin's Gardens using an enabling (ASDA supermarket) development has encountered planning difficulties.

Accordingly, their quarter-final match was played at the stadium on Sunday 10 April 2011 in front of 21,309 supporters, who witnessed the Saints (the 'home' side for the day) beat Ulster 23–13. This secured for the Saints a place in the semi-final of the Heineken Cup where they went on to beat USA Perpignan, again at the Stadium MK.

On 21 January 2012, Northampton Saints played their final 2011–12 Heineken Cup pool match at Stadium MK against Munster Rugby. Saints were defeated 36–51 but the game set a new stadium record attendance of 22,220.

=== Rugby World Cup 2015 ===
On 8 October 2012, the organisers of the 2015 Rugby World Cup announced that the Stadium was one of seventeen to be short-listed for detailed appraisal, leading to the final choice of twelve stadiums to be announced in March 2013 It was announced as a venue for the 2015 Rugby World Cup on 2 May, and with the venue capacity to expand to 32,000, it hosted 3 fixtures.

Pool D	1 October 2015	France	41–18	Canada
Pool B	3 October 2015	Samoa	5–26	Japan
Pool A	6 October 2015	Fiji	47–15	Uruguay

== Skiing, Snowboarding & Tobogganing ==
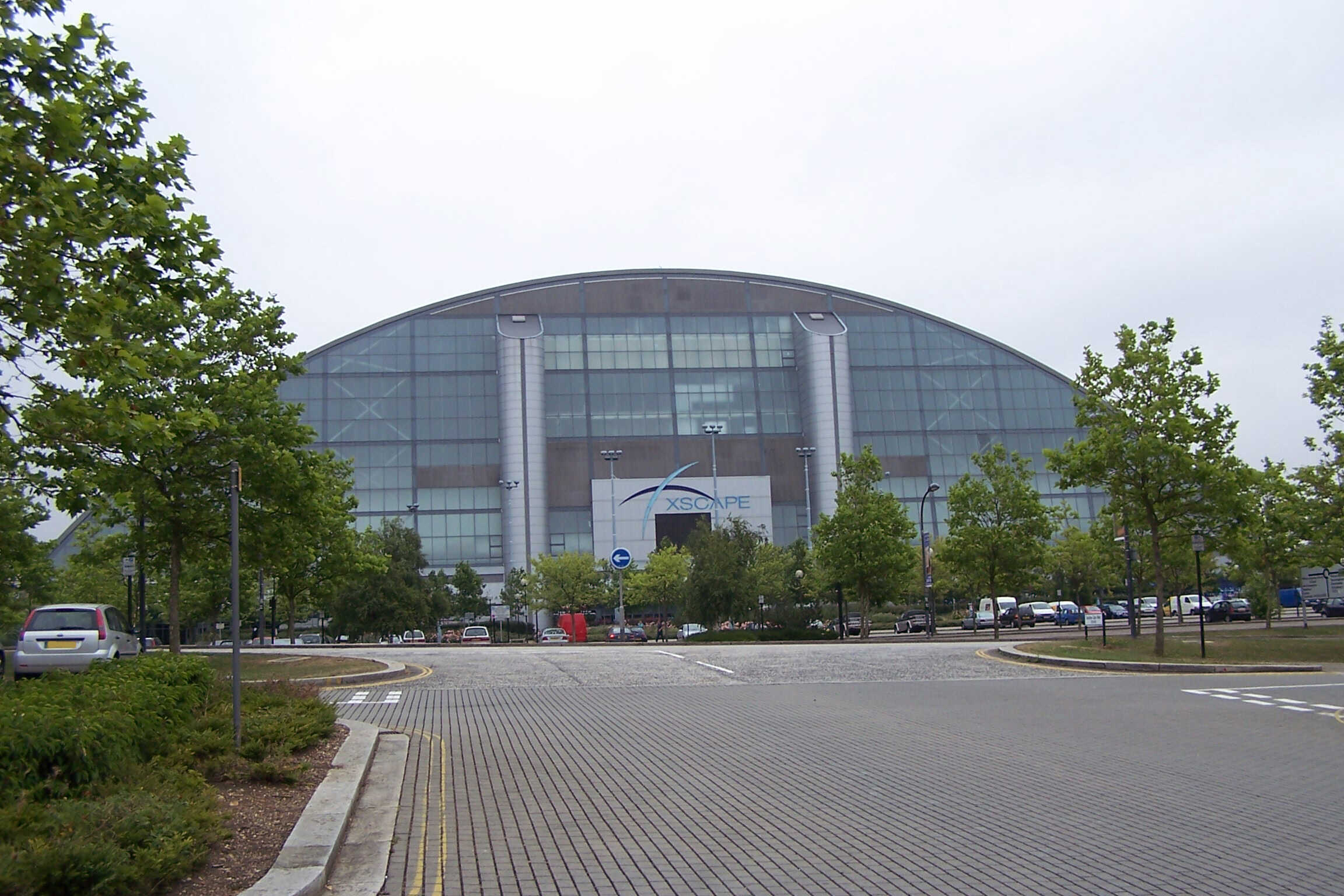
Xscape Milton Keynes seen from across Secklow Gate

Milton Keynes is home to the Xscape indoor ski slope, which means it has snowmaking facilities and is therefore not a dry ski slope.

== Sky diving ==
The Airkix indoor sky diving facility is located at Xscape.

== Swimming ==
There are a number of pools in the Borough, with a competition pool at Stantonbury. The performance swimming club is City of Milton Keynes SC.

== Table tennis ==
Table tennis in Milton Keynes features one of the largest leagues in the UK, with over 60 teams. The city has a purpose-built table tennis centre in Kingston, which serves as the home venue for several England-ranked players.

Other club venues in the league include Greenleys, Newport Pagnell, Woburn Sands, Stony Stratford and the Open University, amongst others.

== Volleyball ==
- MK City VC is a volleyball club formed in 2006 from the ashes of corporate team Abbey VC. It plays out of Oakgrove Leisure Centre.In its first season the men's team completed a league double taking by the Herts and Northants crowns.
- MKVC is a volleyball club which field men's and women's teams in the Herts and Northants league as well as a men's team in the National Division 3.

== Wrestling ==
Total Action Wrestling (TAW) in a Pro-Wrestling promotion based in Wolverton. Notable guest trainers include Doug Williams, Alex Shane, Kenny Omega, Davey Richards and British wrestling legend Johnny Kincaid. The school was originally in Bletchley Leisure centre until the final session in December 2009. The promotion runs events in Milton Keynes, Luton, Dunstable, Hitchin and other towns in the region. The training school moved to Atlas Fitness in Wolverton in January 2010.
