= Kingston, Milton Keynes =

Coordinates: 52.0372°N 0.6855°W

Kingston
- Location within Buckinghamshire
- Interactive map of Kingston
- OS grid reference: SP905385
- Civil parish: Kents Hill and Monkston
- Unitary authority: Milton Keynes
- Ceremonial county: Buckinghamshire
- Region: South East
- Country: England
- Sovereign state: United Kingdom
- Post town: MILTON KEYNES
- Postcode district: MK10
- Dialling code: 01908
- Police: Thames Valley
- Fire: Buckinghamshire
- Ambulance: South Central
- UK Parliament: Milton Keynes North

Kingston is a district in the east side of Milton Keynes, in the civil parish of Kents Hill and Monkston.

Kingston District Centre is a large retail development that serves this side of the Milton Keynes urban area (its home parish and the parishes of Broughton, Milton Keynes (civil parish), Walton, Woburn Sands and Wavendon). The District Centre houses a Tesco hypermarket and other UK high street names, such as Aldi, Boots and other retail outlets. The centre also has a small local library, a meeting place and a separate restaurant building on the Southern ring road. Its Marks and Spencer closed in February 2020

According to Milton Keynes City Council, Kingston, Wolverton, Bletchley and Westcroft form the second tier in the retail hierarchy of the city, below Central Milton Keynes.

Bounded by Chaffron Way (H7) to the north, Tongwell St (A4146/V11) to the east, Standing Way (A421/H8) to the south and Newport Rd (formerly the A5130) to the east, the rest of the district consists of motor dealers, light industry factories and warehouses, including a Costco wholesale.

== Transport ==
=== Rail ===
The closest inter-city service is provided at Milton Keynes Central on the West Coast Main Line, roughly 4 miles (6.4 km) to the west, and services on the Marston Vale Line are provided at Woburn Sands, roughly 2.5 miles (4.0 km) to the south-east.

=== Road ===
The Milton Keynes grid road system connects the district to other local destinations, whilst for accessing national routes, the M1 motorway is easily accessible via junctions 13 and 14, located 3 miles (4.8 km) to the south-east and 2 miles (3.2 km) to the north-west, respectively.

=== Bus ===
The district is served by Arriva buses which only connect to other destinations in Milton Keynes: 3/3A, 8/8A/8E and 9/9A.

MK City Council also operates an on demand bus service known as "MK Connect", which serves the whole MK unitary authority area, including Kingston.
