= Woughton on the Green (parish) =

Former parish in Milton Keynes

Woughton on the Green (parish) was a civil parish in Milton Keynes. In 2012, it was split into two independent parishes. One, called Old Woughton (provisionally, 'Ouzel Valley'), contains the eponymous village of Woughton on the Green. The other, since January 2025 called Woughton, retained the original parish name for a further twelve or so years after the division.

The division of the parish is described at Woughton#Campaign to divide the original parish.
