= Simpson, Milton Keynes =

Coordinates: 52.0157°N 0.7174°W

Simpson
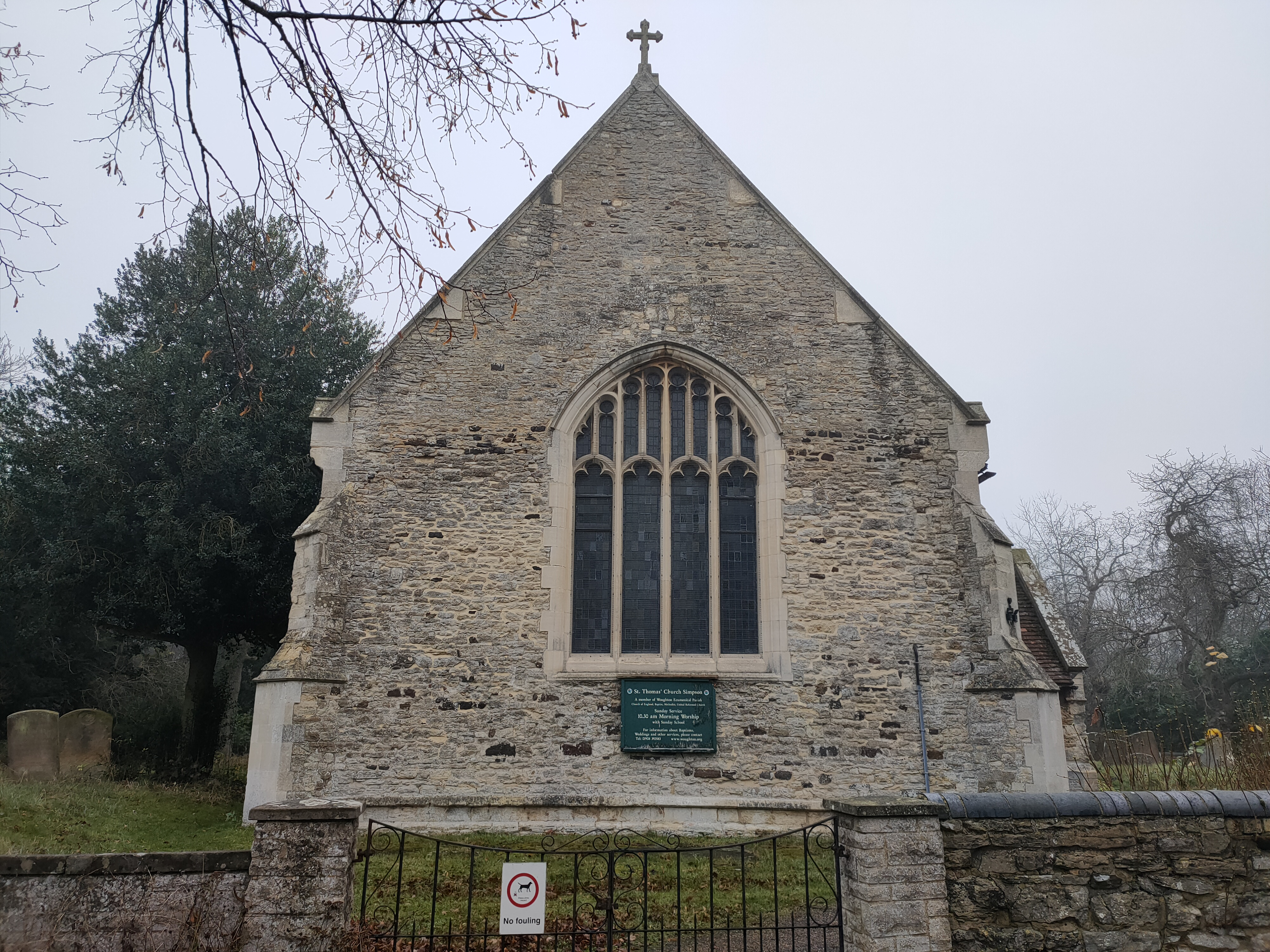
- Ecumenical Church of St Thomas the Apostle (14 C.)

- Location within Buckinghamshire
- Interactive map of Simpson
- OS grid reference: SP883362
- Civil parish: Simpson and Ashland
- Unitary authority: Milton Keynes
- Ceremonial county: Buckinghamshire
- Region: South East
- Country: England
- Sovereign state: United Kingdom
- Post town: MILTON KEYNES
- Postcode district: MK6
- Dialling code: 01908
- Police: Thames Valley
- Fire: Buckinghamshire
- Ambulance: South Central
- UK Parliament: Milton Keynes Central

Simpson is a village in Milton Keynes, England. It was one of the villages of historic Buckinghamshire that was included in the "New City" in 1967. It is located south of the centre, just north of Fenny Stratford.

Simpson is now part of the civil parish of Simpson and Ashland, which also includes Ashland and West Ashland.

== History ==
The village name is derived from Old English, and means 'Sigewine's farm or settlement'. It was recorded in the Domesday Book of 1086 as Siwinestone. The site of the medieval manor house (between the village and Caldecotte Lake) is a scheduled monument.

In the mid 19th century the village was described as "in appearance, one of the most wretched of many miserable villages in the county". According to Sheahan, until about 1830 "during the wintertime, the main road [London–Northampton] was generally impassable, without wading through water three feet deep, for a distance of about 200 yards"; he goes on to state that "chiefly through the exertions of Mr. C. Warren, the road has been raised by 3 and a half feet". Charles Warren was the owner of Simpson House and was a substantial landowner and contractor. It would have been in his interest to alleviate flooding in the village, although there is no other documentary evidence that he was directly involved in the improvement works.

Simpson was an ancient parish, which included part of Fenny Stratford. It became a civil parish in 1866, but in 1934 the civil parish was abolished and absorbed by Bletchley Urban District, which itself was abolished in 1974 to become part of the Milton Keynes District.

== Ecumenical Church of St Thomas the Apostle ==
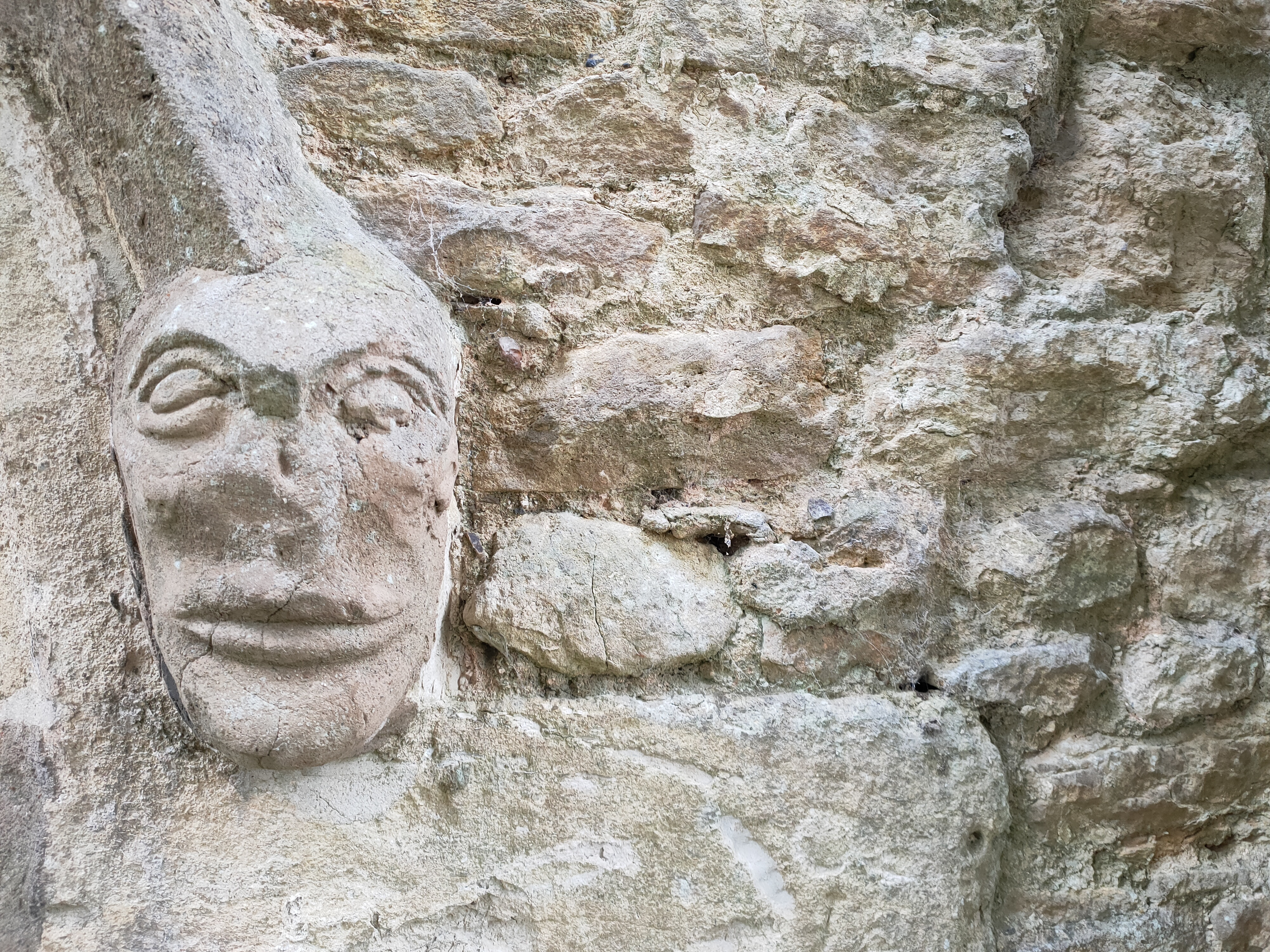
Exterior sculpture at Ecumenical Church of St Thomas the Apostle

The church building dates from the early fourteenth century. By 1847, Simpson, or Sympson, like other ecclesiastical parishes in Buckinghamshire, had been transferred to the Diocese of Oxford. St Thomas is one of the five churches in the Woughton Ecumenical Partnership, which was established in 1977. Among the historical features of the church is a hagioscope, or leper-squint.

== Education ==
There is one school, the Charles Warren Academy, a primary school for children aged 4–11 years. It was previously known as Simpson County Combined School.
