= Long Street, Buckinghamshire =

Hamlet in England

Coordinates: 52.123°N 0.839°W

Long Street
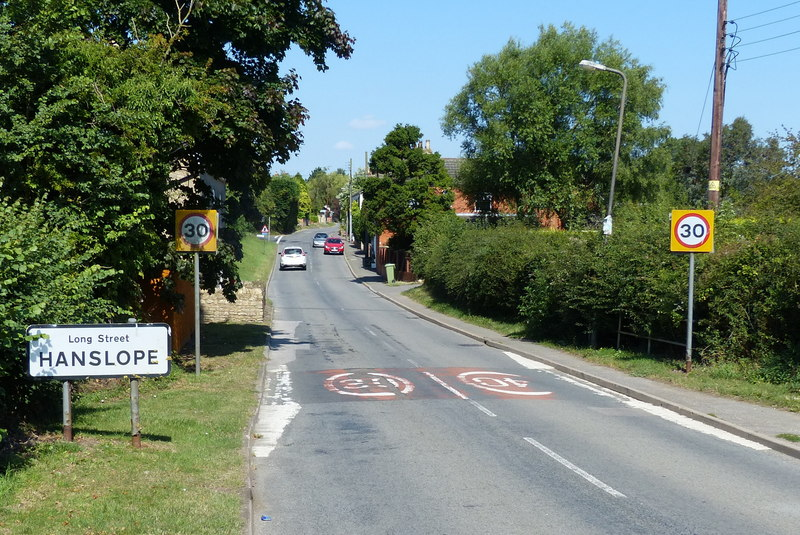
- Entering Long Street on Hartwell Road

- Location within Buckinghamshire
- OS grid reference: SP7948
- Civil parish: Hanslope
- Unitary authority: Milton Keynes
- Ceremonial county: Buckinghamshire
- Region: South East
- Country: England
- Sovereign state: United Kingdom
- Post town: Milton Keynes
- Postcode district: MK19
- Dialling code: 01908
- Police: Thames Valley
- Fire: Buckinghamshire
- Ambulance: South Central
- UK Parliament: Milton Keynes North

Long Street is a hamlet in the parish of Hanslope, in the unitary authority area of the City of Milton Keynes, ceremonial Buckinghamshire, England. It is located on the road that leads from Hanslope to Hartwell, Northamptonshire and Northampton.
