= Two Mile Ash =

Coordinates: 52.0400°N 0.8047°W

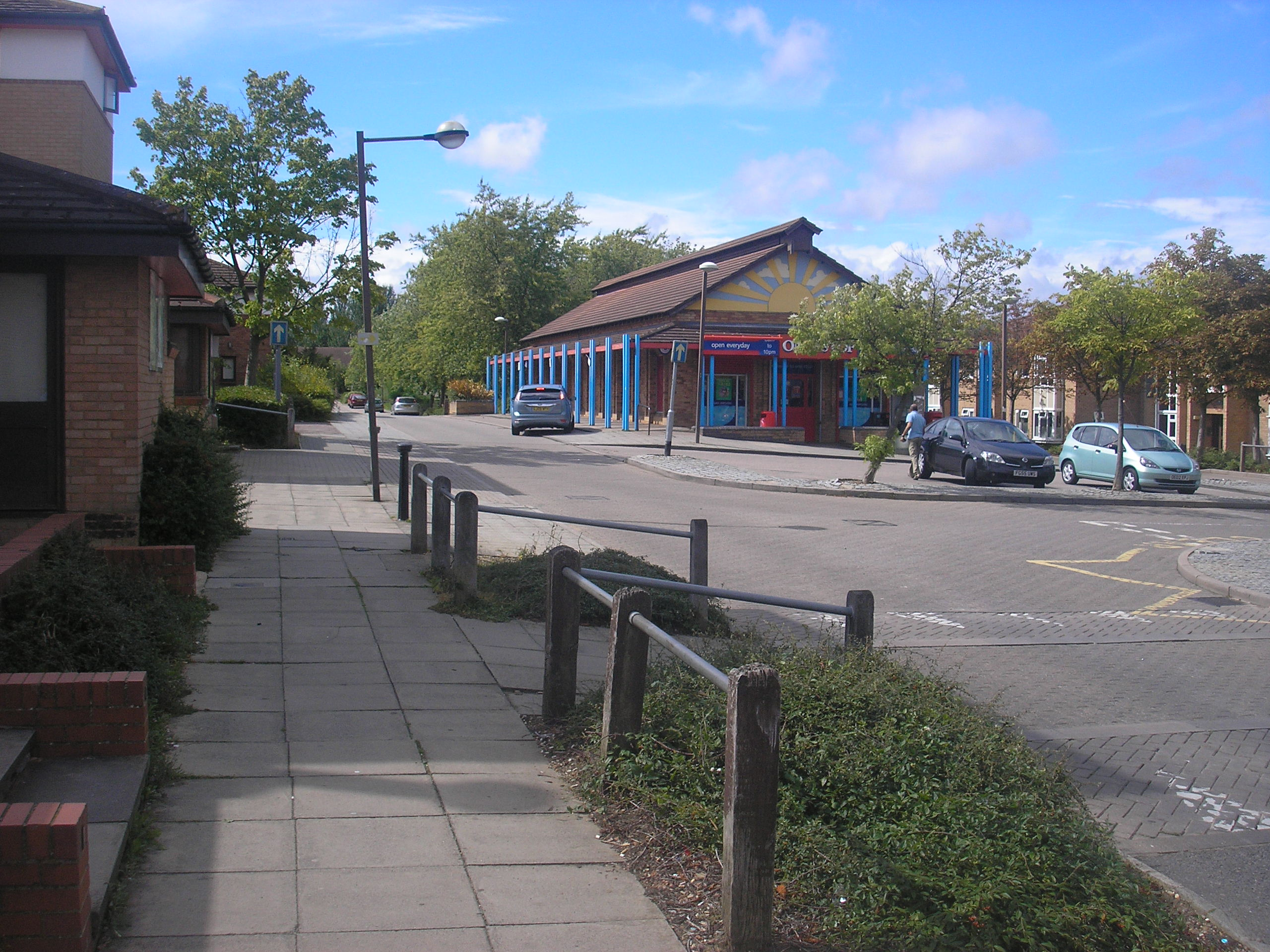
- Two Mile Ash local centre. The High Street passes to either side of the shopping building.

- Location within Buckinghamshire
- Interactive map of Two Mile Ash
- OS grid reference: SP820386
- Civil parish: Abbey Hill
- Unitary authority: City of Milton Keynes
- Ceremonial county: Buckinghamshire
- Region: South East
- Country: England
- Sovereign state: United Kingdom
- Post town: MILTON KEYNES
- Postcode district: MK8
- Dialling code: 01908
- Police: Thames Valley
- Fire: Buckinghamshire
- Ambulance: South Central
- UK Parliament: Milton Keynes North

Two Mile Ash is a district of north-west Milton Keynes in Buckinghamshire, England, two miles south of Stony Stratford, just off Watling Street. The district was named after the Two Mile Ash toll gate on Watling Street. It is one of the larger districts, but a large part of its area is taken up by Abbey Hill, an 18-hole golf course. Consequently, many of the streets here are named after famous golf courses. The district was one of the first to be built in the (mainly) private housing period of the development of Milton Keynes. It is in Abbey Hill civil parish.

The main spine of the area is The High Street with facilities running off it. Three other main roads are named Church Hill, Clay Hill and Corn Hill, all of which provide exits from the district. Fairways is another exit road, which lies near the Abbey Hill Golf Course. Two Mile Ash provides space for one half of this course, the other half is in Kiln Farm, accessed by a foot bridge over Monks Way.

There is a scheme of Findlandia super-insulated houses in Calewen and some very distinctive shared ownership homes in the High Street. It has two schools and two pre-schools. It also has three churches.

== Place name ==
The name is shown on a map dated 1559 as "Mile Ash" as a tree on a mound with Watling Street passing either side. During the early 17th century, the section of Watling Street between Hockliffe and Dunchurch (and thus serving this neighborhood) became a turnpike. A toll-gate, the "Twomile Ash Toll Gate" was located here, and it was from this that Milton Keynes Development Corporation took the district name. By the 1885 edition of the Ordnance Survey six-inch map, a building is shown beside the road, called "Twomile Ash".

A milestone can still be found on Watling Street (now also called the V4). Immediately behind the milestone are three Ash trees planted by Milton Keynes Parks Trust. This section of Watling Street was the original A5 road until the route was diverted onto a new grade-separated dual carriageway, to become the eastern boundary of the district.

=== Other historical interest ===
A Romano-British farmstead was discovered and excavated on the northern edge of the golf course (near the Mercure Hotel on Monks Way).

Two Mile Ash was originally in the lands of Bradwell Abbey.

== Super-insulated houses ==
In mid-80's an evaluation project was set up in Two Mile Ash to trial energy savings by adding two to three times the amount of insulation required by building regulations at the time. The project consists of 12 prefabricated timber houses made by Finlandia Construction in Finland. The designers deliberately avoided incorporating passive solar building design principles. (The houses do not have large south-facing windows to gather warmth from Sun and few, small, windows in north-facing walls). Four semi-detached houses were "super-insulated". Builders injected insulation foam 100 millimetres (4 in) thick under the concrete floor slab. The wall cavities contains glass-fibre insulation 190 millimetres thick; the loft covered by a 300 millimetres (12 in) layer of insulation and the windows were triple glazed.

== Church of the Holy Cross ==
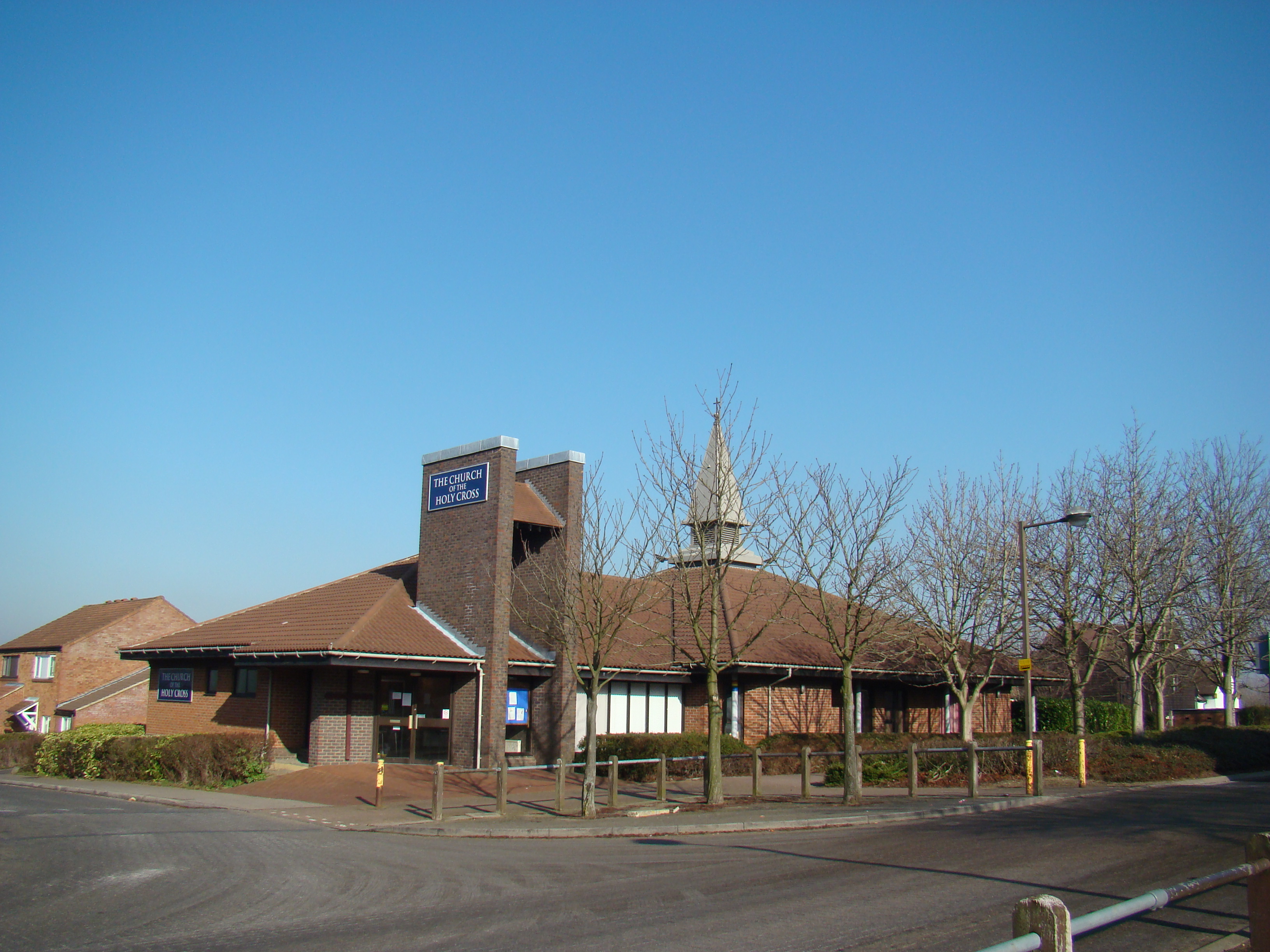
Church of the Holy Cross, Two Mile Ash, on the High Street

The Church of the Holy Cross is an ecumenical church located in Two Mile Ash. The church forms part of the Watling Valley Ecumenical Partnership. The church started life as a home based organisation. As numbers increased, it moved first into the Community Annexe at Two Mile Ash Middle School, and then the main hall. The present building was completed in November 1989, and seats around 170 people.

== See also ==
- Two Mile Ash, Horsham
