= Simpson and Ashland =

Civil parish in Milton Keynes, England

Coordinates: 52.0157°N 0.7174°W

- Location within Buckinghamshire
- Interactive map of Simpson and Ashland
- Population: 1,701 (2021 census)
- OS grid reference: SP881360
- Civil parish: Simpson and Ashland
- District: City of Milton Keynes
- Unitary authority: Milton Keynes City Council
- Ceremonial county: Buckinghamshire
- Region: South East
- Country: England
- Sovereign state: United Kingdom
- Post town: MILTON KEYNES
- Postcode district: MK6
- Dialling code: 01908
- Police: Thames Valley
- Fire: Buckinghamshire
- Ambulance: South Central
- UK Parliament: Milton Keynes Central
- Website: Simpson and Ashland Parish Council

Simpson and Ashland is a civil parish in the south of Milton Keynes, a city in Buckinghamshire, England.

The parish comprises the village of Simpson and the districts of Ashland and West Ashland. At the 2021 Census the population of the civil parish was 1,701.

== Ashland ==
At present a residential area, Ashland was formerly known as the site of the original Milton Keynes Greyhound Stadium, a greyhound racing track. It had been running since the 1960s but was demolished in 2006 to make way for new housing developments. The track was to have been relocated to Elfield Park near the National Bowl but this plan was eventually abandoned.

Ashland has lakes, woodland and a public art project completed in 2014, the Ashland Water Serpent.

== Simpson ==
Simpson was one of the villages of historic Buckinghamshire that was included in the "New City" in 1967. The village name is derived from Old English, and means 'Sigewine's farm or settlement'. It was recorded in the Domesday Book of 1086 as Siwinestone.

== West Ashland ==
This is a small district, part of the Denbigh grid-square but severed from most of the grid-square by the A5 dual carriageway. As of January 2019, the only operational development there is the national headquarters and commissary for Domino's Pizza, UK. The remainder of the district is taken up by development of the "blue light hub", a combined operational centre and base for emergency services in Milton Keynes, which opened on 1 July 2020. Consequently, the fire stations at Bletchley and Great Holm have closed.
