= Bradwell Abbey =

Historic site in Milton Keynes, England

Coordinates: 52.0480°N 0.7947°W

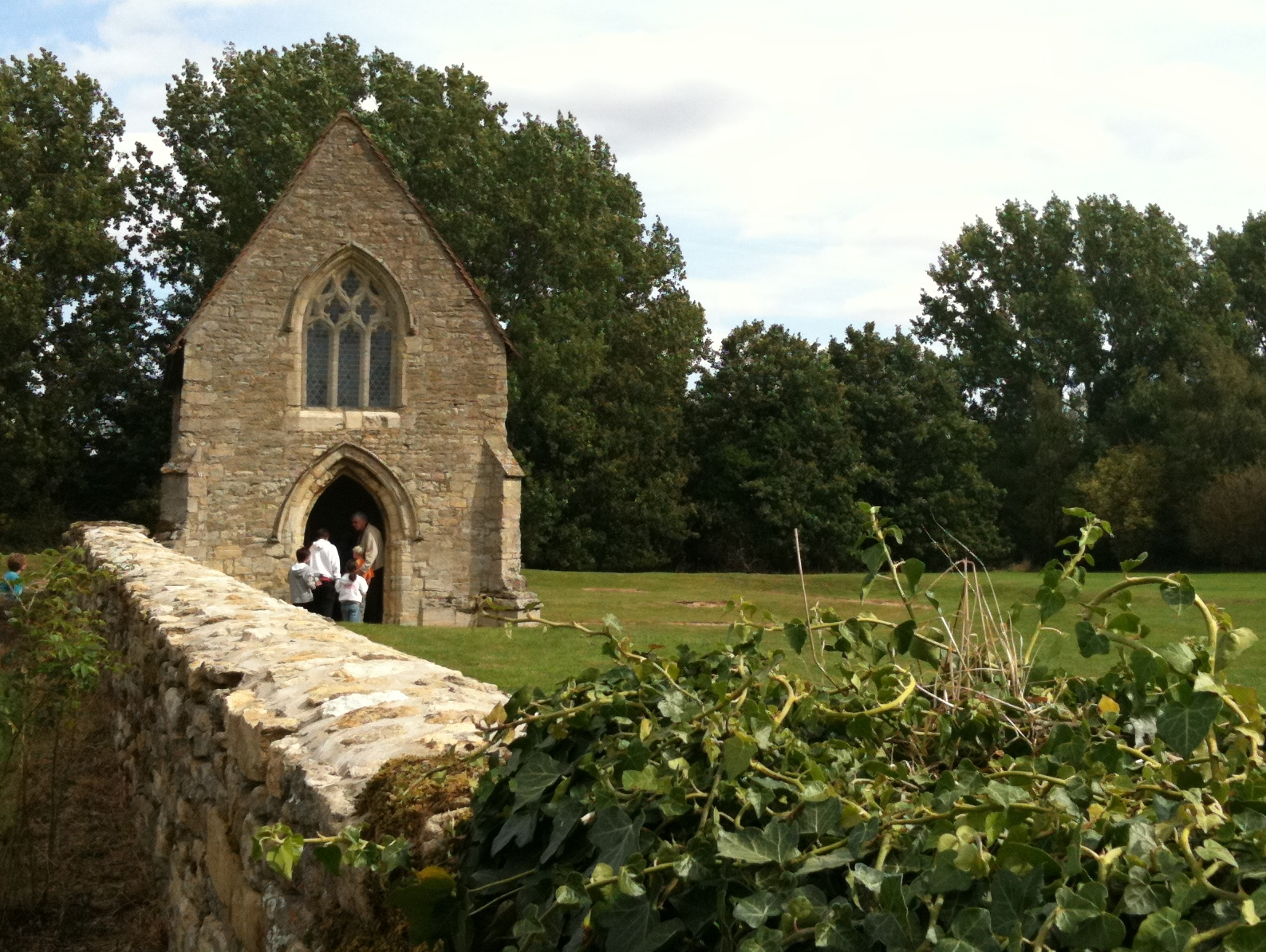
- Chapel at Bradwell Abbey

- Location within Buckinghamshire
- Interactive map of Bradwell Abbey
- Area: 4 km^{2} (1.5 sq mi)
- Population: 6,544 (2001 census)
  - Density: 1,636/km^{2} (4,240/sq mi)
- OS grid reference: SP826395
- Civil parish: Bradwell
- District: City of Milton Keynes
- Unitary authority: Milton Keynes City Council
- Ceremonial county: Buckinghamshire
- Region: South East
- Country: England
- Sovereign state: United Kingdom
- Post town: MILTON KEYNES
- Postcode district: MK13
- Dialling code: 01908
- Police: Thames Valley
- Fire: Buckinghamshire
- Ambulance: South Central
- UK Parliament: Milton Keynes North

Bradwell Abbey or Bradwell Priory is a scheduled monument and urban studies site in Milton Keynes, Buckinghamshire, England. It was a Benedictine priory, founded around 1154 and dissolved in 1524. The name Bradwell Abbey is also used for the district around the abbey site. In addition, Bradwell Abbey was the name of a civil parish which existed from 1858 until 2011. In 2001 the parish had a population of 6544.

== Historic Bradwell Priory ==
The Priory was established around 1154. It grew during the Middle Ages to become an important local centre, but declined during the Black Death when, amongst others, its prior William of Loughton died. The Priory was closed in 1524 (some 12 years before the general dissolution of the monasteries) and the site of the monastery and its scanty revenues were granted to Cardinal Wolsey for the endowment of his new college. All that remains today is a small chapel and a farmhouse that has become a centre for cultural activities and an Urban Studies centre. Many of the medieval trackways converging on the abbey became rights of way and bridleways and subsequently became part of the Milton Keynes redway system (a network of shared paths).

The arrival of the West Coast Main Line railway split the Abbey lands, with Bradwell village to the east of the line and the Abbey to the west. Today, the small Bradwell Abbey district includes parkland and industry outside the Abbey grounds.

The Abbey site in total is a Scheduled Monument. The Chapel of St Mary is a Grade I listed building. There are a further five Grade II listed buildings or structures on the Abbey grounds.

== Bradwell Abbey today ==
Today, Bradwell Abbey is home to the Milton Keynes City Discovery Centre (an urban studies centre), providing a workspace, library and guidance for visiting international town planners and students who wish to study the development of Milton Keynes. It also hosts school visits to see its medieval buildings – the chapel is Grade I listed – its fish ponds and its physic garden, and how they have changed since then. Finally the Abbey provides meeting space to local community groups.

== Togfest ==
An annual music festival was started on the site in 1999. Performers have included Vikki Clayton in 1999, Joe Driscoll in 2005. In 2009 the festival dates were 26 and 27 June and acts performing included The Swanvesta Social Club.

== Bradwell Abbey district ==
The modern Bradwell Abbey district is a relatively small one, sandwiched as it is between the West Coast Main Line to the east, the A5 to the west, H3 Monks Way (A422) to the north and H4 Dansteed Way to the south. It includes a small industrial estate and the Loughton Valley flood plain "linear park". The Swan's Way long-distance path and the Sustrans route 51 follow the valley.

Formally, it is in the Bradwell grid-square, but this square is split into three parts by the railway line (on an embankment) and the A5 (in a cutting).

== Civil parish ==
The abbey was named after the neighbouring ancient parish of Bradwell, but the abbey complex and its estate constituted an extra-parochial area, outside any parish. Bradwell Abbey continued to be an extra-parochial area long after the dissolution of the abbey itself. Such extra-parochial areas were made civil parishes in 1858.

The civil parish of Bradwell Abbey stretched from a little west of Watling Street to a little east of the West Coast Main Line (and thus on either side of the (modern) A5).

On 1 April 2011, the parish was abolished. The part west of the A5 became the new civil parish of Abbey Hill, the part east of the A5 and north of the A422 (a tiny part of Stacey Bushes and Bancroft) became part of Wolverton and Greenleys, and the remainder, including the Abbey site and the adjacent lands east of the A5 and south of the A422, became part of Bradwell.

== See also ==
- New Bradwell
- Bradwell village
- History of Milton Keynes
- Snelshall Priory
