= Westcroft =

Coordinates: 52.003°N 0.797°W

- Location within Buckinghamshire
- Interactive map of Westcroft
- OS grid reference: SP828346
- Civil parish: Shenley Brook End
- Unitary authority: Milton Keynes
- Ceremonial county: Buckinghamshire
- Region: South East
- Country: England
- Sovereign state: United Kingdom
- Post town: MILTON KEYNES
- Postcode district: MK4
- Dialling code: 01908
- Police: Thames Valley
- Fire: Buckinghamshire
- Ambulance: South Central
- UK Parliament: Buckingham and Bletchley

Westcroft is a district in the western part of Milton Keynes, Buckinghamshire, England, in the civil parish of Shenley Brook End.

Westcroft District Centre is a large retail development that serves this side of Milton Keynes (Tattenhoe, Emerson Valley, Furzton, Kingsmead, Shenley Brook End, Shenley Lodge, Oakhill, Shenley Wood, Shenley Church End and western West Bletchley). The District Centre includes a branch of Morrisons and other UK high street names, such as Boots, Costa Coffee, Greggs, Tim Hortons, KFC, McDonalds, B&M, Aldi along with a dental surgery, car wash, pet store and Renault dealership. The centre also has a small local library, community shop and a meeting place. A health centre is located adjacent to the district centre. According to Milton Keynes City Council, Westcroft, Wolverton, Bletchley and Kingston form the second tier in the retail hierarchy of the city, below Central Milton Keynes.

Westcroft is in the catchment area for Oxley Park Combined School and Shenley Brook End Secondary School.

The rest of Westcroft consists of mainly housing, located around a large, formally planted park and a large sports field. At the southern end of the park there is a car park and the sports pavilion.

== Environment ==
Howe Park Wood, a Site of Special Scientific Interest, is nearby,
