= Abbey Hill =

Civil parish in Milton Keynes, England

Coordinates: 52.043°N 0.808°W

- Location within Buckinghamshire
- Interactive map of Abbey Hill
- Population: 3,341 (2021 census)
- OS grid reference: SP818389
- Civil parish: Abbey Hill
- District: City of Milton Keynes
- Unitary authority: Milton Keynes City Council
- Ceremonial county: Buckinghamshire
- Region: South East
- Country: England
- Sovereign state: United Kingdom
- Post town: MILTON KEYNES
- Postcode district: MK8, MK11 3
- Dialling code: 01908
- Police: Thames Valley
- Fire: Buckinghamshire
- Ambulance: South Central
- UK Parliament: Milton Keynes North

Abbey Hill is a civil parish that covers the Two Mile Ash, Kiln Farm, and Wymbush districts of Milton Keynes in Buckinghamshire, England. As the first tier of Local Government, the parish council is responsible for the people, living and working in this area of Milton Keynes.

The Parish was formed in 2008 as part of a revision of parishes of the Borough of Milton Keynes: the districts were previously part of a parish called Bradwell Abbey. It is bounded by Millers Way (H2), the A5, Watling Street (V4), and Dansteed Way (H4).

== Districts of the parish ==
=== Two Mile Ash ===
This residential district contains a primary school, a local centre and part of the eponymous Abbey Hill golf course.

=== Kiln Farm ===
This is an employment district of light industry and low-intensity warehousing and distribution. It also contains the remainder of the Abbey Hill golf course.

=== Wymbush ===
This is another employment district of light industry and low-intensity warehousing and distribution.

== Electoral ward (Borough) ==
The Parish falls within the Bradwell Ward of the Borough of Milton Keynes.
