= John Athawes =

English cricketer, educator and clergyman

Personal information
- Full name: John Thomas Athawes
- Born: 8 December 1837; Loughton, Buckinghamshire, England
- Died: 3 October 1915 (aged 77); Tenbury Wells, Worcestershire, England
- Batting: Unknown

Domestic team information
- Years: Team
- 1860: Marylebone Cricket Club

Career statistics
Competition	First-class
Matches	1
Runs scored	12
Batting average	12.00
100s/50s	–/–
Top score	12
Catches/stumpings	–/–
- Source: Cricinfo, 22 June 2021

John Thomas Athawes JP (8 December 1837 – 3 October 1915) was an English first-class cricketer and clergyman.

== Personal life & education ==
The son of The Reverend John Athawes, he was born in December 1837 at Loughton, Buckinghamshire. He was educated at Winchester College, before going up to Clare College, Cambridge. After graduating from Cambridge, Athawes took holy orders in the Anglican Church in 1862, being ordained as a deacon. He took his curacy at Loughton in the same year, which he held until 1864. For the next three years he held the curacy at East Hendred. Athawes was appointed the headmaster of St John's Middle School at Kennington in 1867, a post he remained in until 1881. He spent 1882 in Italy as a chaplain at Bologna. Athawes returned to Loughton in 1883 to take up the post of reverend, which he held until his death at Loughton at Tenbury Wells in October 1915. Beside his ecclesiastical duties, Athawes was the diocesan inspector of schools for Oxford and was a justice of the peace for Buckinghamshire. He was also chairman of both the Newport Pagnell Board of Guardians and the Rural District Council.

== Cricket career ==
He did not play cricket while attending Winchester, but did play for Cambridge University Cricket Club in minor matches. However, while studying at Cambridge he did make a single appearance in first-class cricket for the Marylebone Cricket Club (MCC) against Cambridge University at Fenner's in 1860. He batted once in the match, opening the batting in the MCC first innings and scoring 12 runs, before being dismissed by Edward Fawcett.
