= Loughton and Great Holm =

Civil parish in Milton Keynes, England

Coordinates: 52.033°N 0.78°W

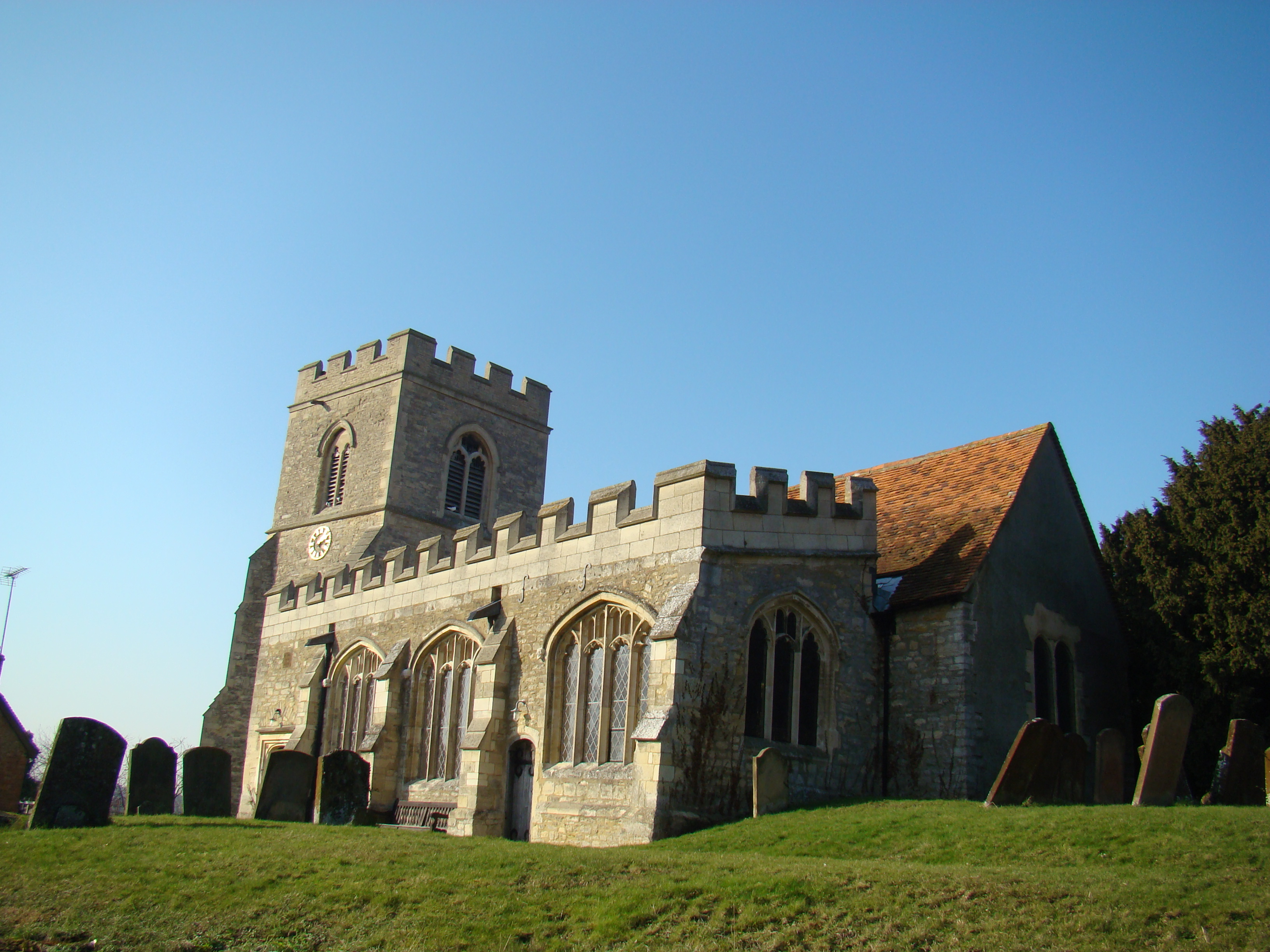
- All Saints Church, Loughton

- Location within Buckinghamshire
- Interactive map of Loughton and Great Holm
- Population: 6,237 (2021 census)
- OS grid reference: SP836379
- Civil parish: Loughton and Great Holm
- District: City of Milton Keynes
- Unitary authority: Milton Keynes City Council
- Ceremonial county: Buckinghamshire
- Region: South East
- Country: England
- Sovereign state: United Kingdom
- Post town: MILTON KEYNES
- Postcode district: MK5, MK8
- Dialling code: 01908
- Police: Thames Valley
- Fire: Buckinghamshire
- Ambulance: South Central
- UK Parliament: Milton Keynes Central

Loughton and Great Holm is a civil parish in the City of Milton Keynes, Buckinghamshire, England. It includes the districts of Loughton, Great Holm, the National Bowl and Elfield Park, West Rooksley, Loughton Lodge, and Knowlhill. It is bordered by H4 Dansteed Way to the north, V4 Watling Street to the west, a tiny stretch of H8 Standing Way to the south, and the West Coast Main Line to the east. Originally named Loughton, it was renamed to Loughton and Great Holm in 2013.

== Loughton ==
Loughton /ˈlaʊtən/ is an ancient village and modern district. The village spreads between Watling Street and the modern A5 road. It is just to the west of Central Milton Keynes, with pedestrian access over the A5 to Milton Keynes Central railway station.

The original village has now been incorporated into the modern 'grid square' of Loughton. However much of the character of the old village remains; to the north-east of Bradwell Road the area bounded by School Lane and Church Lane contains the Church and remnants of the original parish of Great Loughton. To the south-west of Bradwell Road, around The Green there is a cluster of several sixteenth century buildings (Manor Farm, Manor Farm Cottages and Cell Farm) which constitute the remains of the original parish of Little Loughton.

Today Loughton is a mainly residential area but is also home to a large Equestrian Centre, in the grounds of which the medieval field pattern and fish pond can still be seen.

The district is bounded by the A5 to the east, H5 Portway to the north, V4 Watling Street to the west and H6 Childs Way to the south.

== Great Holm ==
Great Holm is primarily a residential district and contains a high point overlooking much of the central area of Milton Keynes.

The MacIntyre Charity which provides support for people with learning disabilities has a care home in Great Holm and a large centre providing a variety of day time activities. They also run a coffee shop and bakery which is open to the public, providing supported employment for people with learning disabilities.

=== Loughton Lodge ===
Loughton Lodge is a small area of Great Holm next to Loughton 'grid square' linked to Loughton by an underpass under which runs the old Bradwell Road and separated from the bulk of Great Holm by Lodge Lake (a balancing lake).

Loughton Lodge is home to the National Badminton Centre, health club, Girl Guides site and a small gated development of luxury apartments.

This district is bordered by H4 Dansteed Way to the north, V4 Watling Street to the west, H5 Portway to the south and the A5 to the east.

== Knowlhill ==
Knowlhill is primarily an employment area with a large parkland alongside the A5. Much of this area is a flood plain of the Shenley Brook, and contains the "Teardrop Lakes" — small balancing lakes.

In the late 1980s, Knowlhill was designated by Milton Keynes Development Corporation as being the industrial part of the "Energy Park" – with the residential part across Watling Street (in Shenley Lodge), home to the 1986 Energy World exhibition. All buildings were expected to meet higher standards of energy efficiency than were normal at the time, and five exemplar offices were built before 1990 including the then headquarters of Royal Mail Parcelforce.

In 1990 the rest of the area was unsuccessfully marketed as a single large-scale development opportunity, intended to fund a National Energy Centre through development gain. Although this plan failed, the area retains a strong link with sustainable energy and hosts the main offices for the National Energy Foundation (which occupies a low energy building on the intended site of the National Energy Centre), the Zero Carbon Hub, United Sustainable Energy Agency and the National Home Energy Rating Scheme. The area also contains the head office of the National House Building Council (NHBC) and a testing laboratory set up by the Consumers' Association but subsequently owned by Intertek, as well as lawyers, graphic design companies and warehousing.

This district is bordered by H6 Childs Way to the north, V4 Watling Street to the west, H7 Chaffron Way to the south and the A5 to the east.

=== Tear-drop lakes ===
The linear park through the district is an important local leisure amenity for most of the year but its technical purpose is to provide flood control for the Loughton Brook, a tributary of the River Ouzel (itself a tributary of the River Great Ouse). Flooding is controlled by a cascade of tear-drop shaped balancing lakes, though in extreme conditions the neighbouring park land can accept flooding without undue property damage.

== National Bowl and Elfield Park ==
The National Bowl concert venue and its associated land is almost triangular, bordered by H7 Chaffron Way to the north, V4 Watling Street to the west, a tiny stretch of H8 Standing Way to the south, and the A5 to the east. The adjacent Elfield Park is a narrow strip of land between the A5 and the railway line, in part a nature studies reserve and in part a general utility space.
