= Shenley Brook End =

Civil parish in Milton Keynes, England

Coordinates: 52.009°N 0.789°W

- Location within Buckinghamshire
- Interactive map of Shenley Brook End
- Population: 27,083 (2021 census)
- OS grid reference: SP831352
- Civil parish: Shenley Brook End
- District: City of Milton Keynes
- Unitary authority: Milton Keynes City Council
- Ceremonial county: Buckinghamshire
- Region: South East
- Country: England
- Sovereign state: United Kingdom
- Post town: MILTON KEYNES
- Postcode district: MK5
- Dialling code: 01908
- Police: Thames Valley
- Fire: Buckinghamshire
- Ambulance: South Central
- UK Parliament: Milton Keynes Central

Shenley Brook End is a village, district and wider civil parish in Milton Keynes, Buckinghamshire, England, located about 2 miles (3.2 km) north-west of Bletchley, and 2.5 miles (4.0 km) south-west of Central Milton Keynes. Together with its neighbouring districts of Shenley Church End, Shenley Wood and Shenley Lodge, the districts are collectively known as "The Shenleys".

Today, the historic village is the core of the new district that bears its name. The district is bounded by V2 Tattenhoe Street, V3 Fulmer Street, H6 Childs Way and H7 Chaffron Way.

The mathematician and logician Alan Turing was billeted here during his time at Bletchley Park.

== History ==
The village name 'Shenley' is an Old English language word meaning 'bright clearing'. In the Domesday Book of 1086 the area was collectively known as Senelai.

The distinction between the Brook End and the Church End happened in the 12th century when a new manor house was constructed in Shenley Brook End by the Mansell family. However, by 1426 the two manors were owned by the same person and the distinction between the two places was in name only.

== Education ==
It has primary school, Long Meadow, and a secondary school, Shenley Brook End School.

== Civil parish ==
The parish includes Shenley Lodge, Furzton, Shenley Brook End, Emerson Valley, Westcroft, Tattenhoe (including Kingsmead, Howe Park Wood and Snelshall East) and Tattenhoe Park (including Snelshall West). The parish is bounded to the north-east by V4 Watling Street, to the north-west by H6 Childs Way, to the south-west by the City boundary with the rest of Buckinghamshire (at Whaddon) and to the south-east by H8/A421 Standing Way.

=== Emerson Valley ===
Emerson Valley is primarily a housing district but is noted for being the home of Milton Keynes Rugby Football Club. It is also the name of an electoral ward for Milton Keynes City Council.

=== Furzton ===
Furzton is primarily a housing district with a small office development but half the district is taken up by Furzton Lake (a balancing lake) and the flood plain of Loughton Brook.

=== Shenley Lodge ===
Shenley Lodge is a residential district, noted for the Energy World development of exemplar high-energy-efficiency houses in 1986.

=== Snelshall and Kingsmead ===
These two grid squares are in the far south-west of Milton Keynes, abutting the boundary with Whaddon parish. They are primarily residential, with an industrial area south of the brook. The notable feature of the district is the site of the ruined Snelshall Priory, a ruined Benedictine priory founded in about 1200.

=== Tattenhoe and Tattenhoe Park ===
These districts share the Tattenhoe grid square and are primarily residential.

=== Westcroft ===
A large fraction of Westcroft is taken by the District Centre of the same name. It is a large retail development that serves the west side of Milton Keynes. The rest of the district is residential.

== Shenley Brook ==
The brook rises near the site of Snelshall Priory, flows through Furzton where it is joined by a tributary from Emerson Valley, then goes on to become the "tear-drop lakes" in Loughton and flows into the river Great Ouse at New Bradwell.
