= Kents Hill and Monkston =

Civil parish in Milton Keynes, England

Coordinates: 52.0286°N 0.6951°W

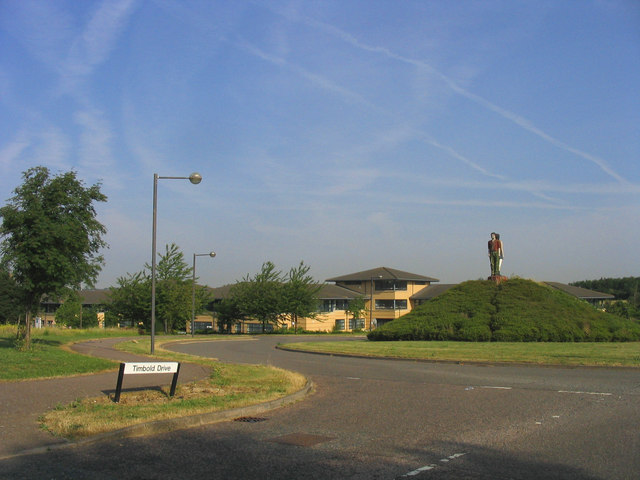
- Timbold Roundabout

- Location within Buckinghamshire
- Interactive map of Kents Hill and Monkston
- Population: 8,563 (2021 census)
- OS grid reference: SP895371
- Civil parish: Kents Hill and Monkston
- Unitary authority: Milton Keynes City Council
- Ceremonial county: Buckinghamshire
- Region: South East
- Country: England
- Sovereign state: United Kingdom
- Post town: MILTON KEYNES
- Postcode district: MK9, MK10
- Dialling code: 01908
- Police: Thames Valley
- Fire: Buckinghamshire
- Ambulance: South Central
- UK Parliament: Milton Keynes North

Kents Hill and Monkston, formerly Kents Hill, Monkston and Brinklow is a civil parish that covers the Kents Hill, Brinklow, Monkston, Monkston Park and Kingston neighborhoods of Milton Keynes in Buckinghamshire, England. As the first tier of Local Government, the Parish Council is responsible for the people, living and working in this area of Milton Keynes.

The Parish was formed on 1 April 2001 as part of a general parishing of the Borough. It is bounded by Chaffron Way, the Broughton Brook, Newport Road, Groveway, Brickhill Street, Standing Way, and the River Ouzel. On 1 January 2025 the parish was renamed from "Kents Hill, Monkston and Brinklow" to "Kents Hill and Monkston".

== Districts of the parish ==
=== Kents Hill ===
The west side of this district contains part of the Open University campus (the buildings originally belonged to De Montfort University), a training and conference centre for junior staff (previously operated by British Telecom then by Accenture), and a Delta hotel. The rest of the district is residential, much of it overlooking a large recreational area. There is a local shop, a church, three parks and three 11-a-side football pitches in the district. There is also a school which consists of a nursery and a first school and a new all-through primary and secondary school that opened in September 2018.

In February 2020, the conference centre was used to house people evacuated from China during the COVID-19 pandemic, who were being quarantined for 14 days until being given the all-clear from risk of infection with SARS-Cov-2 virus.

In 1994, FutureWorld took place in Kents Hill, demonstrating 36 new houses to the public in 1994 before going on sale.

=== Monkston and Monkston Park ===
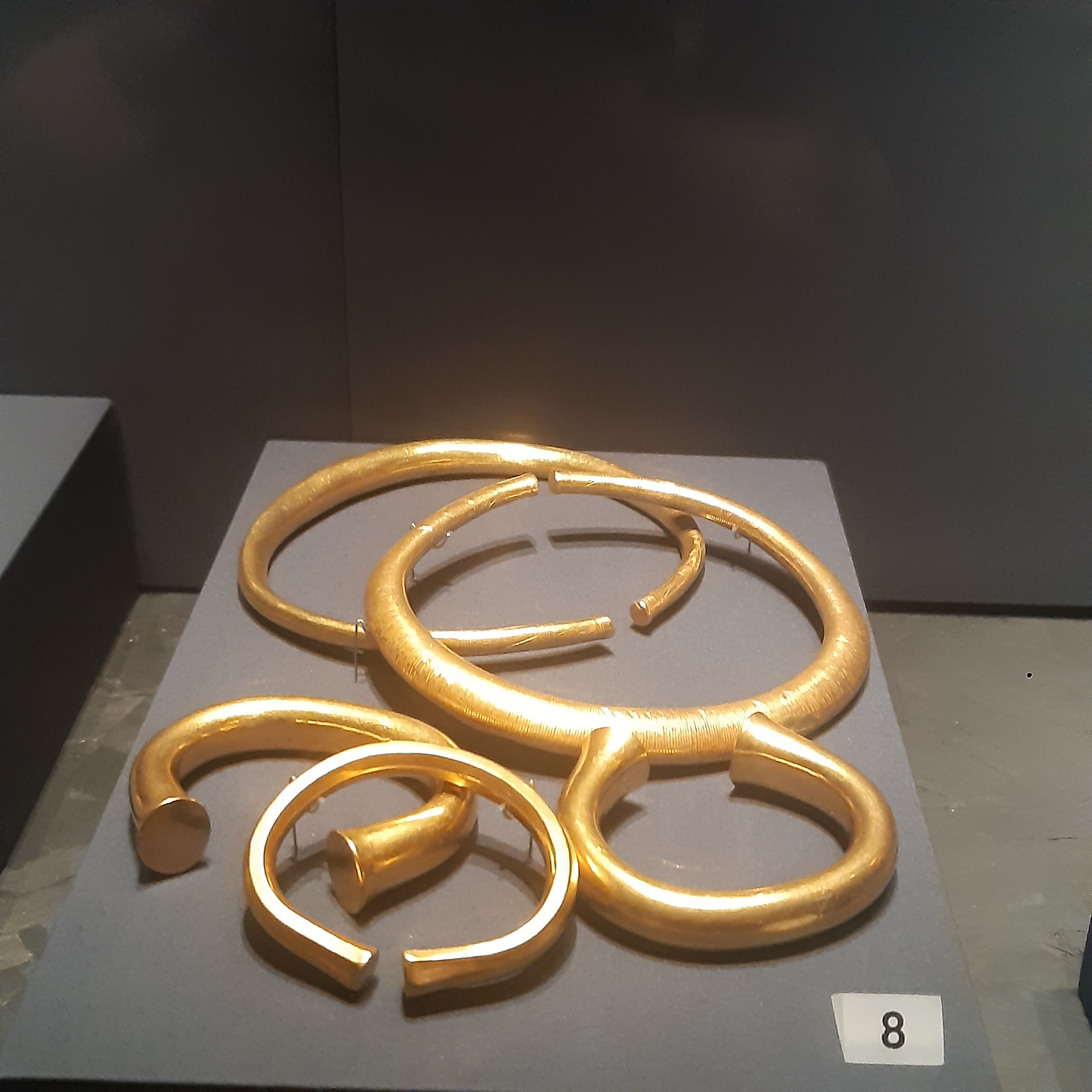
The Milton Keynes Hoard of Bronze Age torcs and bracelets, on display at the British Museum

This is primarily a residential district based around a large circular recreational area and a combined school. Monkston Park is near to the River Ouzel and has its own small local centre and a nearby 'village green'. Both areas although sharing a similar name are actually separated by the V10 Brickhill Street.

==== Pre-history ====
The area that was to become Milton Keynes was relatively rich: possibly the largest (by weight) hoard of Bronze Age jewellery ever found in Britain ("the Milton Keynes Hoard") was discovered in Monkston Park and consists of two late Bronze Age gold torcs and three gold bracelets. The metal detectorists who found the hoard were rewarded with 60% of the value after the Treasure Valuation Committee decided that the landowners' claim that the finders had searched without permission was unfounded.

=== Kingston ===
The Kingston district is primarily a manufacturing and distribution industries one [due to its proximity to Junctions 13 and 14 of the M1]. At its centre is a large retail complex, dominated by a Tesco hypermarket: this complex serves the eastern and south-eastern suburbs of Milton Keynes.

=== Brinklow ===
This is a relatively small warehousing and industrial district. It is dominated by the large Waitrose distribution centre.

== Electoral ward ==
The Parish is part of the Monkston Ward of the Milton Keynes City Council.
