= Loughton, Milton Keynes =

District of Milton Keynes, England

Coordinates: 52.033°N 0.78°W

Loughton
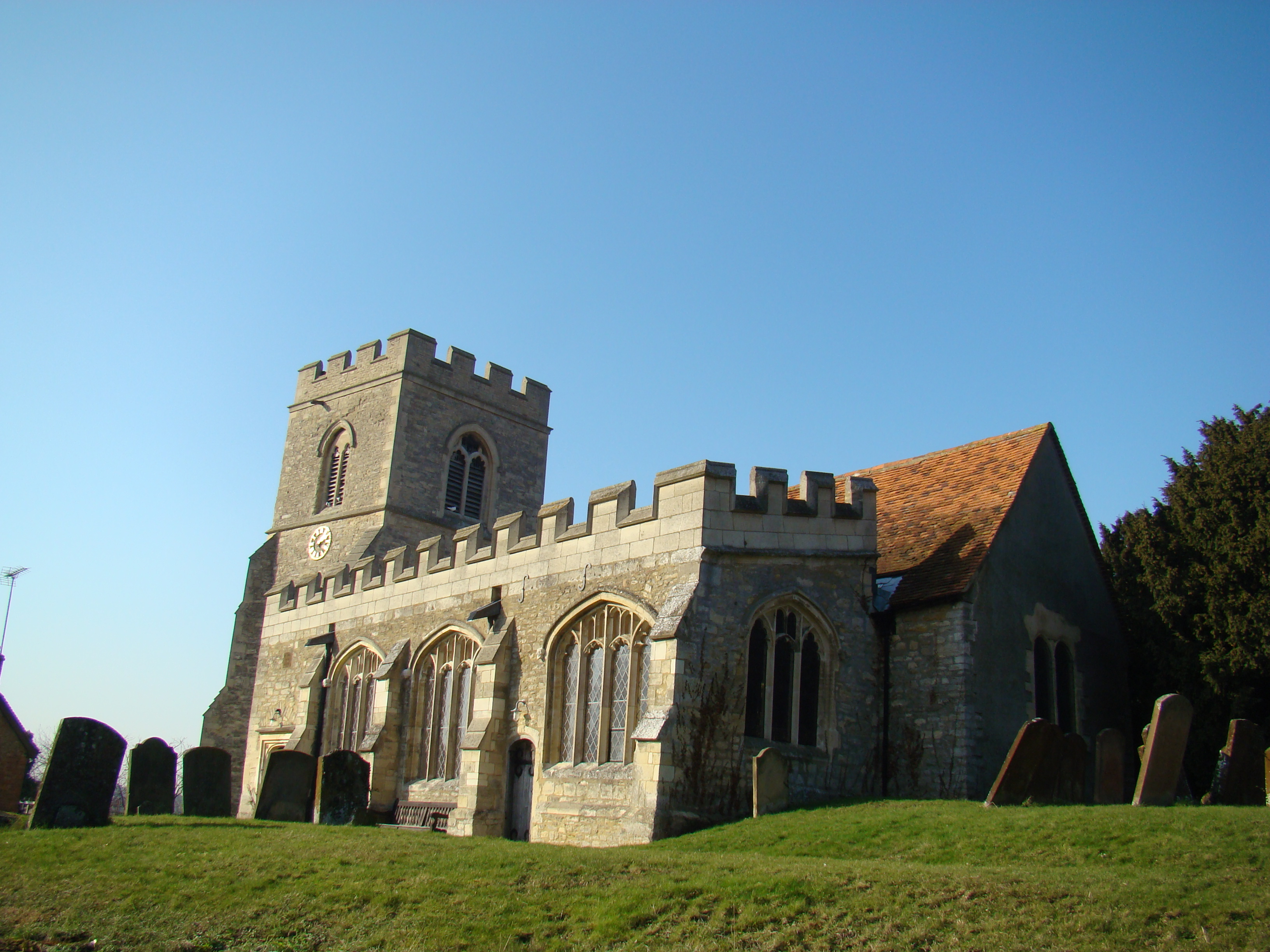
- All Saints Church

- Location within Buckinghamshire
- Interactive map of Loughton
- Civil parish: Loughton and Great Holm
- Unitary authority: Milton Keynes
- Ceremonial county: Buckinghamshire
- Region: South East
- Country: England
- Sovereign state: United Kingdom
- Post town: MILTON KEYNES
- Postcode district: MK5
- Dialling code: 01908
- Police: Thames Valley
- Fire: Buckinghamshire
- Ambulance: South Central
- UK Parliament: Milton Keynes Central

Loughton (/ˈlaʊtən/) is a historic village and modern neighbourhood in the civil parish of Loughton and Great Holm in Milton Keynes, Buckinghamshire, England. It lies approximately 1 mile (1.6km) west of Central Milton Keynes, bounded by the A5 to the east, H5 Portway to the north, V4 Watling Street to the west and H6 Childs Way to the south. According to the 2011 census, Loughton had a population of 6,363 across 2,418 households.

== History ==
The village name derives from Old English meaning 'Luhha's estate'. In the Domesday Book of 1086 it was recorded as Lochintone. During the Middle Ages it consisted of two parishes separated by Loughton Brook – Great Loughton to the north-east of Bradwell Road, and Little Loughton to the south-west. The two were united into a single parish in 1408.

The area continued as a rural farming community for centuries, centered on All Saints Church and the cluster of buildings around The Green. It was incorporated into the new city of Milton Keynes in the early 1970s, though much of the original character of the village has been preserved.

== Heritage and listed buildings ==
All Saints Church is the oldest surviving building in Loughton. Built between the 13th and 15th centuries, it is Grade II* listed and has an embattled west tower with 14th‑century two‑light belfry windows, a south porch, aisle and Lady chapel dating from the 15th century and a nave arcade that continues into the chancel; the nave and chancel themselves probably date from the early 13th century, though all the original details have been removed during subsequent alterations. Inside are transitional lancet windows, a 14th‑century tower arch with triple shafts, a 13th century font and monuments to Hugh Parke (rector, 1514), Robert Crane (Fellow of Trinity College, Cambridge, 1672) and Mary Tresham (1624), daughter of Sir Thomas Tresham. Opposite the church, a dry rubble stone retaining wall along Church Lane forms the churchyard boundary; this post‑medieval wall is Grade II listed.

On The Green stands Manor Farmhouse, the manor house of Little Loughton. The stone‑faced house incorporates part of a late 15th/early 16th century timber‑framed hall. Valentine Piggot reconstructed it around 1580 and added a rear wing in 1615. It is built of limestone rubble with ashlar dressings and has an old tile roof with diagonally shafted chimneys. The south front features a gabled two‑storey porch with a stone‑mullioned window above a four‑centred arched doorway, and the interior retains moulded beams, Tudor‑arched fireplaces and 16th‑century wall paintings. It is Grade II* listed.

Cell Farmhouse is a Grade II listed building on The Green, dating from the 16th or 17th century. Built of colourwashed rubble stone, it has a steeply pitched roof and a distinctive chimney with two diagonally-set brick shafts. The north front has three bays of casement windows and a six-panel door, with a single-storey extension to the right.

Manor Farm Cottages is a Grade II listed building on The Green, dating from the 16th to 17th century and originally divided into two separate cottages. It is built of coursed rubble beneath a thatched half-hipped roof, with three chimneys and a coped west gable. The east front retains much of its original character, including wooden casement windows, two closely-set buttresses flanking a central doorway, and a blocked fire window at ground floor level.

Around 150 metres west of Loughton Manor lies a Scheduled Monument comprising a medieval moated site, a fishpond, and associated earthworks. The square moat measures roughly 40 metres across with a well-preserved central platform, and connects via a series of channels and sluices to a large dry fishpond to the south. Seven rectangular building platforms have been identified nearby, thought to be the remains of water-powered industrial buildings of medieval date. To the west, ridge-and-furrow earthworks survive beneath the remains of a later stock enclosure, interpreted as a medieval lambing pen.

== Natural features and green spaces ==
Loughton is bordered by the Loughton Valley Park, a linear park that follows the course of Loughton Brook through the district. The park is part of Milton Keynes's green infrastructure and provides traffic-free walking and cycling routes connecting to nearby areas such as Bradwell and Shenley Church End. The park includes woodland, open meadows, and wetlands that support local biodiversity.

== Sport and leisure ==
Loughton is home to a large equestrian centre in the south of the district. The centre's grounds preserve the medieval field pattern.

Loughton Lodge, on the northern end of the district, is home to the National Badminton Centre, the headquarters for Badminton England and a national training facility for the sport.

== Education ==
Local education is served by Loughton School, which caters to junior-aged pupils, and Loughton Manor First School, which serves early years and Key Stage 1 students. Both schools are situated within the district and have strong links with community organisations. For secondary education, most children attend nearby institutions such as Shenley Brook End School or Denbigh School in Shenley Church End.

== Transport ==
Loughton enjoys good transport connectivity due to its location just west of Milton Keynes Central railway station. The station offers frequent services to London Euston, Birmingham, and Northampton. Several local bus routes also pass through or near the area, linking it with Central Milton Keynes and the wider urban area. Additionally, the district is served by the Milton Keynes redway system, a network of dedicated pedestrian and cycle paths.

== Pronunciation ==
The Received Pronunciation of Loughton is /ˈlaʊtən/ (the "ou" rhymes with "ouch", the "gh" is silent), in contrast to the similarly-spelt neighbouring areas of Broughton /ˈbrɔːtən/ and Woughton /ˈwʊftən/.

== Notable people ==
- John Athawes (born 1837 in Loughton), cricketer
