= Wolverton and Greenleys =

Civil parish in Milton Keynes, England

Coordinates: 52.0624°N 0.8162°W

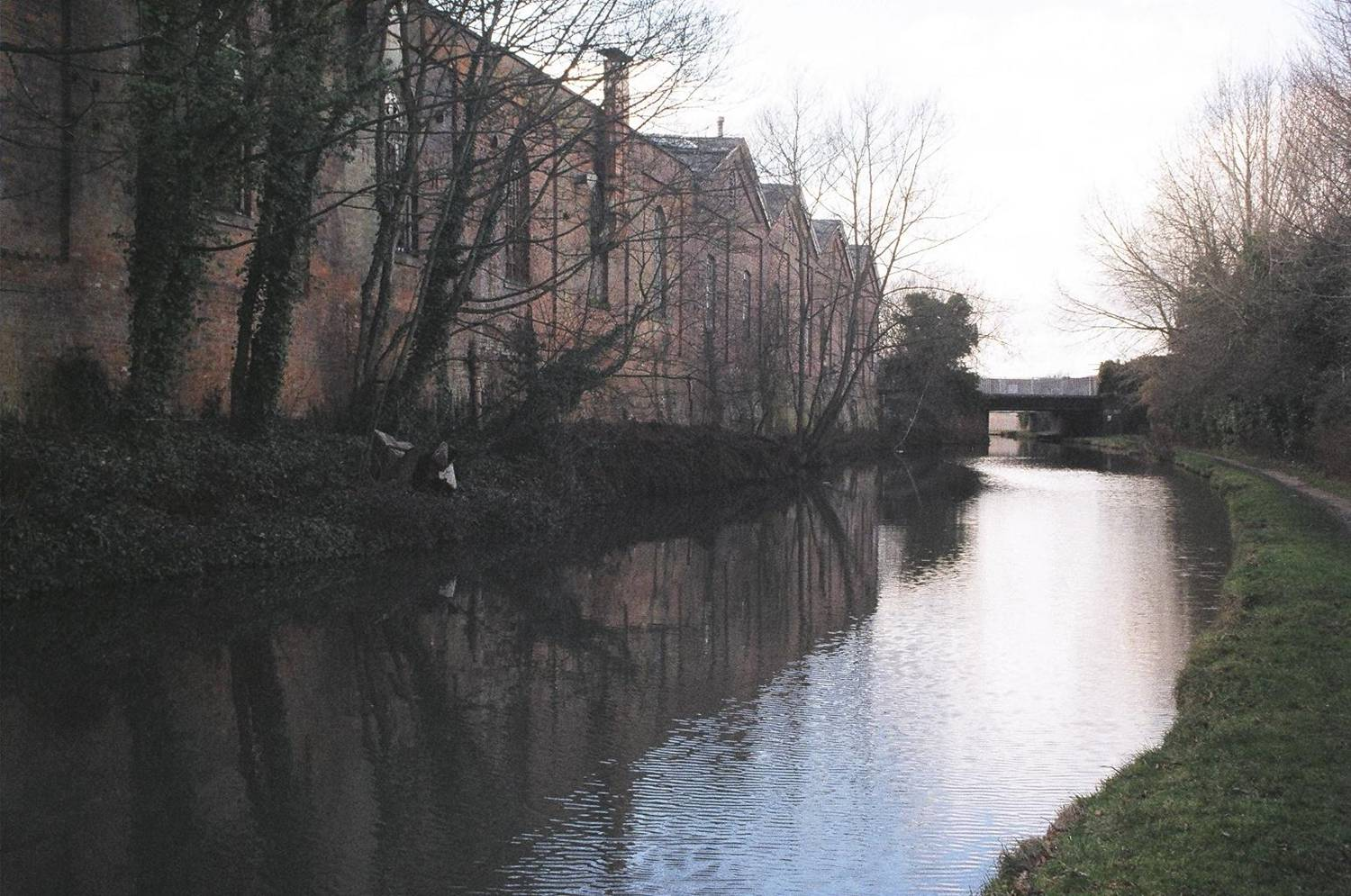
- Old Wolverton railway works with Stephenson bridge, adjoins and crosses the Grand Union Canal

- Location within Buckinghamshire
- Interactive map of Wolverton and Greenleys
- Population: 14,487 (2021 census)
- OS grid reference: SP821414
- Civil parish: Wolverton and Greenleys
- District: City of Milton Keynes
- Unitary authority: Milton Keynes City Council
- Ceremonial county: Buckinghamshire
- Region: South East
- Country: England
- Sovereign state: United Kingdom
- Post town: MILTON KEYNES
- Postcode district: MK12
- Dialling code: 01908
- Police: Thames Valley
- Fire: Buckinghamshire
- Ambulance: South Central
- UK Parliament: Milton Keynes North

Wolverton and Greenleys is a civil parish with a town council in Milton Keynes, England. It is north-west of Central Milton Keynes, and according to the 2021 census had a population of 14,487. It includes Wolverton, Old Wolverton, § Wolverton Mill, § Greenleys and Stonebridge.

The parish is bounded to the north by the River Great Ouse, to the east by the West Coast railway line, to the south by the Millers Way (H2) grid road, and to the west by the A5.

The parish was formed in 2001 as part of a general creation of parishes in the unparished part of Milton Keynes.

At its southeast corner, it contains the Milton Keynes Museum which includes the Stacey Hill collection of rural life and many memorabilia of the nearby Wolverton railway works.

== Greenleys ==
Greenleys is a district to the west of Wolverton. It consists of about two thirds public rented housing and one third private (owner-occupied or private rented). Its boundaries are H1 Ridgeway to the north-west, the A5 to the south-west, V5 Great Monks Street to the north-east and H2 Millers Way to the south-east.

== Wolverton Mill ==
This district is composed primarily of light industry with some private housing. Its boundaries are H1 Ridgeway to the south-east, the A5 to the south-west, V5 Great Monks Street to the north-east and either Stratford Road or the river Great Ouse to the north-west. The eponymous mill is disused undershot watermill on the river. The area between Stratford Road and the river has very few buildings.
