= Old Woughton =

Civil parish in Milton Keynes, England

Coordinates: 52.031679°N 0.724661°W

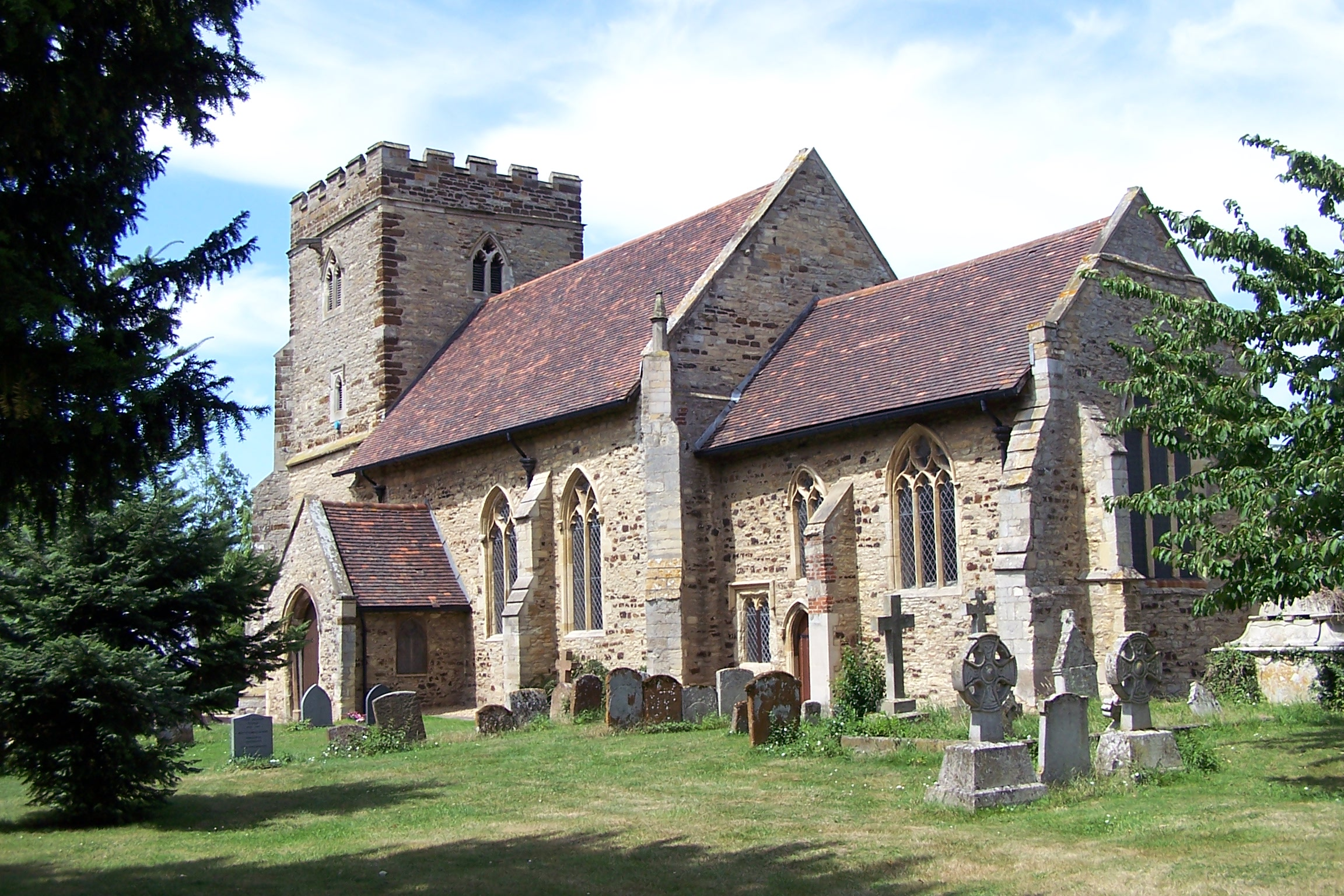
- St Mary's parish church

- Location within Buckinghamshire
- Old Woughton parish, highlighting Woughton on the Green village
- Population: 867 (2021 census)
- OS grid reference: SP875378
- Civil parish: Old Woughton
- District: City of Milton Keynes
- Unitary authority: Milton Keynes City Council
- Ceremonial county: Buckinghamshire
- Region: South East
- Country: England
- Sovereign state: United Kingdom
- Post town: MILTON KEYNES
- Postcode district: MK6
- Dialling code: 01908
- Police: Thames Valley
- Fire: Buckinghamshire
- Ambulance: South Central
- UK Parliament: Milton Keynes Central
- Website: Old Woughton Parish Council website

Old Woughton (/ˈwʊftən/ WUUF-tən) is a district and civil parish in south central Milton Keynes, Buckinghamshire, England. The parish was established in April 2012, by the division into two parts of the historic "Woughton on the Green" civil parish.

== History ==
Woughton-on-the-Green is listed in the Domesday Book of 1086.

The parish church of the Assumption of the Blessed Virgin dates from the 13th century. The tower was added in the 15th century, and the church was extended in the 19th century, adding the north porch and organ loft.

The Old Swan Inn dates back to 1700.

Woughton House was built in 1813, and was the home of Major W J Levi JP of the Royal Bucks Hussars. It is now a hotel.

The Methodist Chapel dates from 1867.

== Creation of the modern parish ==
The parish was created following a campaign by residents of (what was then) Woughton on the Green (parish), who petitioned Milton Keynes Council in 2010. The Council originally rejected the proposals, however it agreed to instigate a further review. The proposal was reconsidered by Milton Keynes Council in November 2011 who decided to split the Woughton parish into two and establish a new parish from April 2012 The new parish was given the temporary name of 'Ouzel Valley' and elections to the parish council were held in May 2012. At the first meeting of the nine-member parish council on 9 May 2012 the name of Old Woughton Parish was adopted. (The remainnder of the original parish retained the name "Woughton on the Green" until January 2025, when it changed its name to simply Woughton.)

== Geography ==
The parish includes the areas of Woughton on the Green, Woughton Park and Passmore. The boundaries of the parish run from the Netherfield Roundabout (H8/V8), south along the V8 (Marlborough Street) to a point where it intersects a redway north of Tinkers Bridge, then east along the redway to the Grand Union Canal, then south along the Canal to a point where it intersects H9 (Groveway), then along H9 (Groveway) to a point where it intersects the River Ouzel, then north along the River Ouzel to a point where it intersects H7 (Chaffron Way), then west along H7 (Chaffron Way) to a point where it intersects the Grand Union Canal, then south along the Grand Union Canal to a point where it intersects H8 (Standing Way), then west along H8 (Standing Way) to the Netherfield Roundabout (H8/V8).

=== Woughton on the Green ===
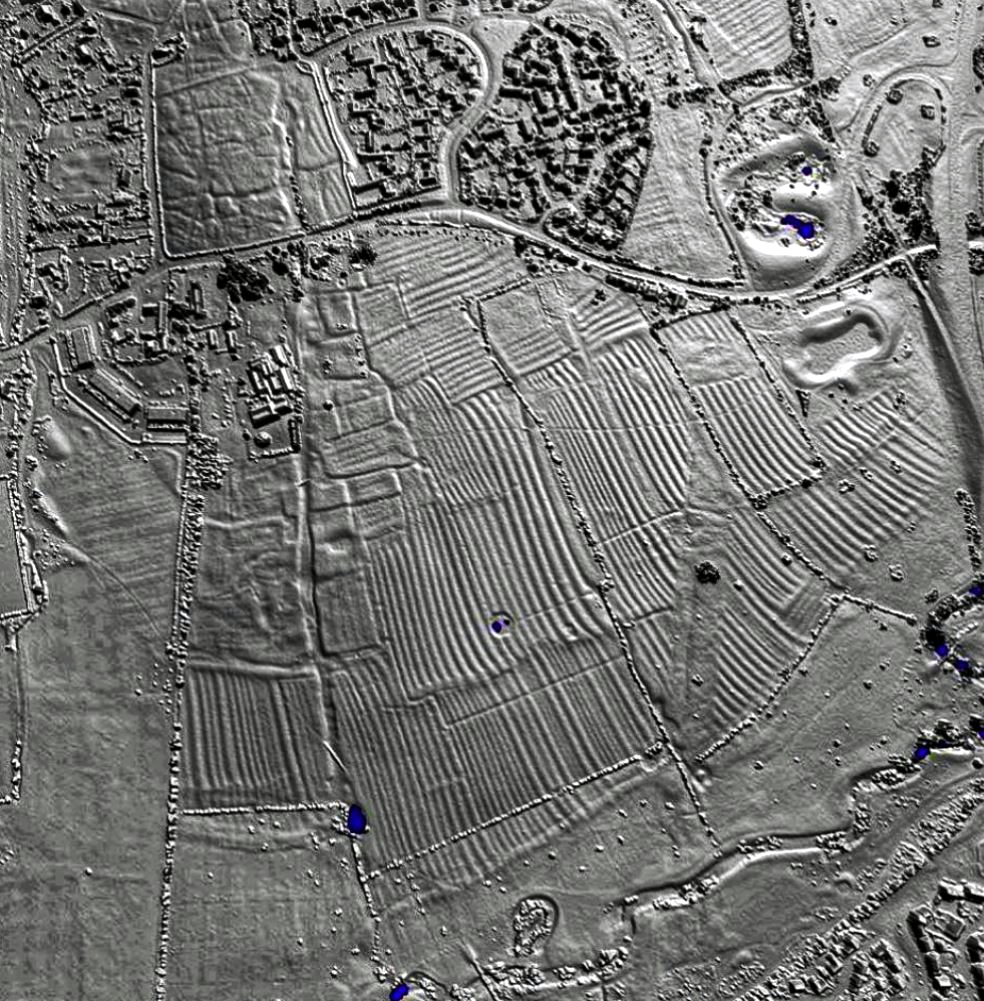
A lidar view of Woughton-on-the-Green shrunken village and Ouzel Valley Park

Woughton on the Green is a traditional Buckinghamshire village that is now part of Milton Keynes.

The village name is Anglo-Saxon in origin and means "Weoca's farm". Names for the village have included Ulchetone (11 cent., Domesday); Woketon (13 and 14 c.); Wocton (14 c.); Woughton on the Green (16 c.); Woughton alias Wokington super the Green (17 cent.). The suffix 'On the Green' refers to the large grassy area that lies in the centre of the village: the traditional village green.

By the time of the coronation of Queen Victoria, Woughton on the Green was a large village, due largely to the nearby Grand Union Canal and later to the nearby Wolverton Works that served the West Coast Main Line. Its population peaked at 350 in 1850, declining to 150 by 1960.

Today the village is part of a larger grid square, though separated from its neighbours by the Grand Union and the flood plain of the River Ouzel. The parochial church council still meets at the ecumenical parish church of St. Mary.

According to legend, Woughton on the Green was one of the bases of Dick Turpin. His ghost, and that of his mare Black Bess, have occasionally been reported in the area.

=== Woughton Park ===
Woughton Park lies between the Grand Union Canal and the River Ouzel, in the same grid square as Walton Hall (home to the Open University), Tinkers Bridge and Passmore, although it is not connected by road to any of them: all development is accessed via Newport Road, the former B488. The housing is predominantly private, mainly built in the 1970s. The only employment in the area is a working farm. In terms of population, it is the smallest wholly residential area recognised by the council in Milton Keynes.

=== Passmore ===
'Passmore' is a small, mainly owner occupied, housing development in the Tinkers Bridge grid square, located close to the H8/V8 intersection and bordered to the east by the Grand Union Canal.

== Facilities ==
Approximately 60% of the parish is green space. Leisure facilities include the Woughton Pavilion and sports fields, a section of the Ouzel Valley Park and 'The Patch' allotments, a large site comprising over 200 plots.
