= City of Milton Keynes =

Unitary authority area in England

- City, borough and unitary authority area
- Coat of arms
- Motto(s): By knowledge, design and understanding
- City of Milton Keynes, shown within Buckinghamshire and England
- Interactive map of City of Milton Keynes
- Coordinates: 52.03°N 0.77°W
- Sovereign state: United Kingdom
- Constituent country: England
- Region: South East
- Ceremonial county: Buckinghamshire
- Incorporated: 1 April 1974

Government
  - Type: Unitary authority
  - Governing body: Milton Keynes City Council
  - MPs: Chris Curtis (Lab) (Milton Keynes North); Emily Darlington (Lab) (Milton Keynes Central); Callum Anderson (Lab); Buckingham and Bletchley

Area
  - Total: 309 km^{2} (119 sq mi)

Population (2024)
  - Total: 305,884
  - Rank: 50th
  - Density: 991/km^{2} (2,570/sq mi)
- Postcode: MK
- Area code: 01908
- ISO 3166 code: GB-MIK
- GSS code: E06000042
- Website: milton-keynes.gov.uk

The City of Milton Keynes is a borough in Buckinghamshire, England, which has had city status since 2022. It takes its name from its main settlement, Milton Keynes. The borough abuts Bedfordshire, Northamptonshire and the remainder of Buckinghamshire. (Note: Buckinghamshire is a single county for ceremonial purposes, divided for administrative purposes between two Unitary Authorities, Milton Keynes City Council for the north of the county and Buckinghamshire Council for the remainder/) It is administered by Milton Keynes City Council, which has been a unitary authority since 1997. It is the northernmost district of the South East England Region.

The principal built-up area in the borough is the Milton Keynes urban area, which accounts for about 20% of its area and 90% of its population. The borough also includes many rural areas surrounding the Milton Keynes urban area, especially to the north, containing several villages and the town of Olney. At the 2021 census, the population of the borough was just over 287,000.

== History ==
The district was created on 1 April 1974 under the Local Government Act 1972, covering the whole area of four former districts and part of a fifth, which were all abolished at the same time:

- Bletchley Urban District
- Newport Pagnell Urban District
- Newport Pagnell Rural District
- Winslow Rural District (part within the designated New Town area only, rest went to Aylesbury Vale)
- Wolverton Urban District

The new district was named Milton Keynes after the new town which had been designated in 1967, covering a large area in the south of the new district. The district was given borough status from its creation, allowing the chair of the council to take the title of mayor.

As established in 1974, the borough of Milton Keynes was one of five non-metropolitan districts of Buckinghamshire, with Buckinghamshire County Council providing county-level services to the area. On 1 April 1997, Milton Keynes became a self-governing unitary authority by being redefined as its own non-metropolitan county, independent from Buckinghamshire County Council. Milton Keynes remains part of the ceremonial county of Buckinghamshire for the purposes of lieutenancy.

On 15 August 2022, letters patent were issued giving the borough the status of a city, allowing the council to change its name to Milton Keynes City Council.

== Local government ==
Arising from the local government elections of May 2024, the borough is governed by a Labour administration. The Liberal Democrat party is the main opposition group.

In the 2024 election Labour gained 4 seats to become the majority party, having previously been part of a joint Labour-Lib-Dem run administration.

The borough is fully parished, with over 50 parishes.

== Economy ==
According to data from the Office for National Statistics for 2017, the borough was the highest performing NUTS3 region in the UK outside inner London (which takes the first five places), on the basis of gross value added per head.

== Education ==
Further education in the borough is provided by Milton Keynes College. For higher education, the Open University's headquarters are in Milton Keynes – though, as this is a distance education institution, the only students resident on campus are approximately 200 full-time postgraduates. A campus of the University of Bedfordshire located in Central Milton Keynes, provides conventional undergraduate courses.

Cranfield University is the academic partner in project with Milton Keynes City Council to establish a new university, code-named "MK:U", on a reserved site in the city centre. As of January 2022, the project is stalled pending assurance of government funding.

== Demographics ==
=== Population ===
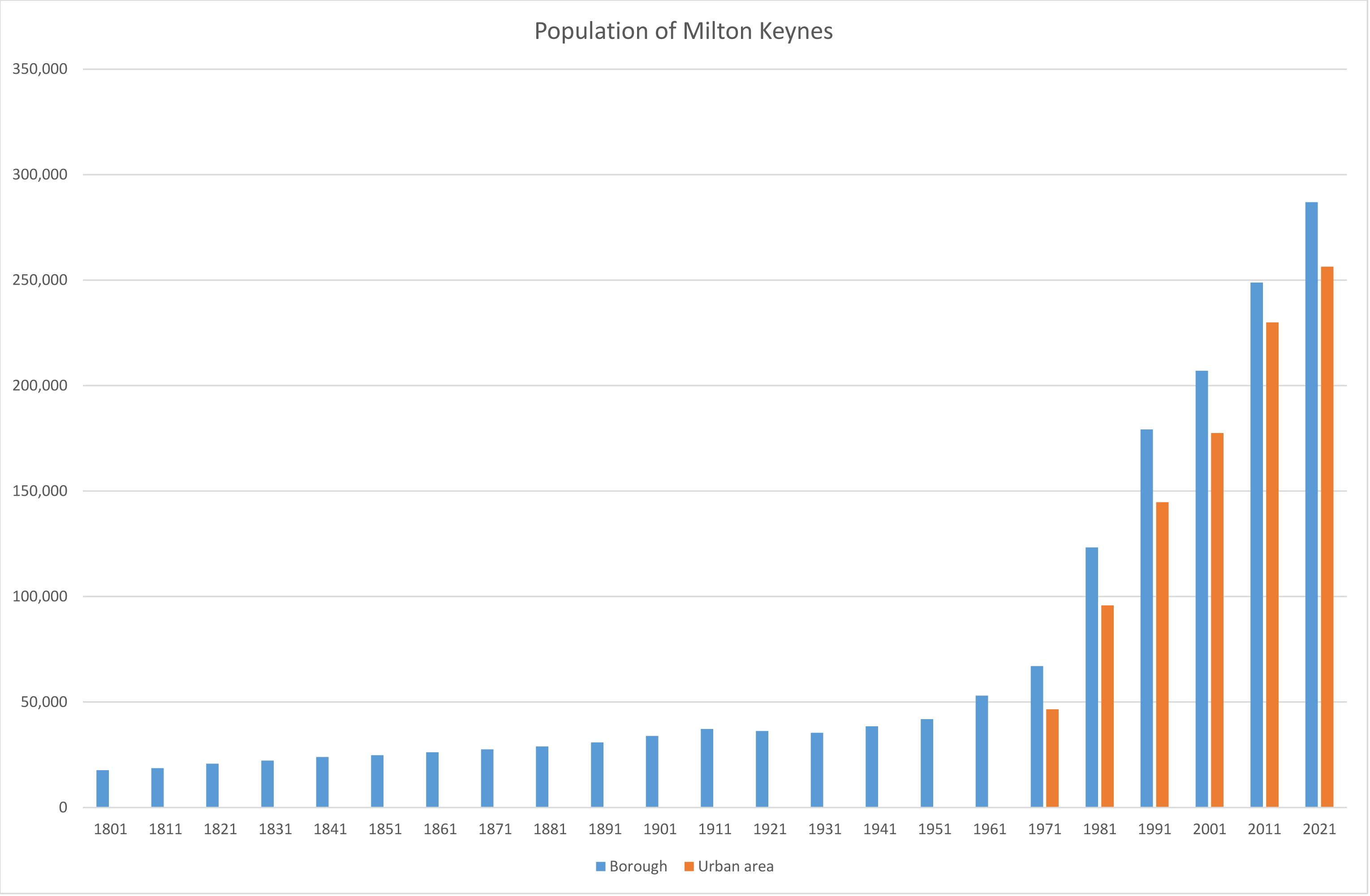
Population trend of borough and Urban Area 1801–2021

Population of City of Milton Keynes (unitary authority area) in 2021

At the 2021 census, the population of the borough was 287,060. This was an increase of 15.3% from the 2011 census, when the population of the borough was 248,821. By 2050, the City Council projects that the borough's population will reach 410,000.

=== Education ===
At the 2021 census, of residents aged 16 and over, 15.8% had no qualifications, 10.9% had a level 1 qualification, 14.2% had level 2, 4.7% were in apprenticeship, 15.7% had level 3, 35.8% had level 4 and 2.9% had other qualifications.

=== Ethnicity ===
In the 2021 census, 71.8% of the population described their ethnic origin as white, 12.3% as Asian, 9.7% as black, 4% as mixed, and 2% as another ethnic group.

Ethnic Group	Year									
Ethnic Group	1981 estimations		1991 census		2001 census		2011 census		2021 census	
Ethnic Group	Number	%	Number	%	Number	%	Number	%	Number	%
White: Total	119,876	95.6%	168,679	94.1%	187,852	90.7%	199,094	80%	206,114	71.8%
White: British	–	–	–	–	179,694	86.8%	183,934	73.9%	178,568	62.2%
White: Irish	–	–	–	–	2,918		2,498		2,382	0.8%
White: Gypsy or Irish Traveller	–	–	–	–	–	–	72		156	0.1%
White: Roma	–	–	–	–					578	0.2%
White: Other	–	–	–	–	5,240		12,590	5.1%	24,430	8.5%
Asian or Asian British: Total	3,073		6,127		9,406	4.5%	22,782	9.2%	35,645	12.3%
Asian or Asian British: Indian	1,560		2,940		3,967	1.9%	8,106	3.3%	15,348	5.3%
Asian or Asian British: Pakistani	398		842		1,682	0.8%	3,851	1.5%	7,163	2.5%
Asian or Asian British: Bangladeshi	388		717		1,072	0.5%	1,989	0.8%	3,189	1.1%
Asian or Asian British: Chinese	325		688		1,835	0.9%	2,722	1.1%	2,913	1.0%
Asian or Asian British: Other Asian	402		940		850	0.4%	6,114	2.5%	7,032	2.4%
Black or Black British: Total	1,722		2,972		4,986	2.4%	17,131	6.9%	27,851	9.7%
Black or Black British: African	289		548		2,596		13,058	5.2%	21,502	7.5%
Black or Black British: Caribbean	1,017		1,716		1,956		2,524		2,975	1.0%
Black or Black British: Other Black	416		708		434		1,549		3,374	1.2%
Mixed or British Mixed: Total	–	–	–	–	3,716	1.8%	8,235	3.3%	11,725	4%
Mixed: White and Black Caribbean	–	–	–	–	1,347		2,243		2,997	1.0%
Mixed: White and Black African	–	–	–	–	477		1,597		2,551	0.9%
Mixed: White and Asian	–	–	–	–	1,037		2,228		2,973	1.0%
Mixed: Other Mixed	–	–	–	–	855		2,167		3,204	1.1%
Other: Total	765		1,417		1,097	0.5%	1,579	0.6%	5,725	2%
Other: Arab	–	–	–	–	–	–	565		1349	0.5%
Other: Any other ethnic group	765		1,417		1,097	0.5%	1,014	0.4%	4376	1.5%
Ethnic minority: Total	5,561	4.4%	10,521	5.9%	19,205	9.3%	49,727	20%	80,946	28%
Total	125,437	100%	179,200	100%	207,057	100%	248,821	100%	287,060	100%

=== Religion ===
The following table shows the religion of respondents in recent censuses in the city of Milton Keynes. By the 2021 census, more than 50% of the population were irreligious or declined to answer the question.

Religion	2001 Census		2011 Census		2021 Census	
Religion	Number	%	Number	%	Number	%
Christian	135,715	65.54	131,352	52.79	122,935	42.83
Muslim	4,843	2.34	11,913	4.79	20,484	7.14
Hindu	2,596	1.25	6,918	2.78	12,911	4.50
Sikh	795	0.38	1,372	0.55	1,959	0.68
Buddhist	747	0.36	1,246	0.50	1,404	0.49
Jewish	466	0.23	427	0.17	383	0.13
Other religion	821	0.40	1,216	0.49	1,558	0.54
No religion	44,633	21.56	77,939	31.32	108,953	37.95
Religion not stated	16,441	7.94	16,438	6.61	16,473	5.74
Total	207,057	100.00%	248,821	100.00%	287,060	100.00%

=== Housing and home ownership ===
Household tenure breaks down to 60.8% of dwellings owner-occupied, 21% of homes privately rented and 18% are socially rented. Due to the borough's fast-growing population, the City Council plans for a minimum of 26,500 dwellings across the borough over the period between 2016 and 2031, with development primarily focused on city estates, expansion areas and strategic land locations in the south and east of Milton Keynes, Campbell Park (in CMK) and the three "Key Settlements" outside of the 1967 "designated development area" of Milton Keynes: Newport Pagnell, Woburn Sands and Olney.

=== Public health ===
According to Public Health England, "The health of people in Milton Keynes is generally similar to the England average. About 15.1% (8,680) children live in low income families. Life expectancy for both men and women is similar to the England average."

== Settlements ==
=== Milton Keynes urban area ===
The City of Milton Keynes is fully parished. These are the parishes, and the districts they contain, that are now elements of the Milton Keynes built-up area as defined by the Office for National Statistics. (Note: This list excludes the civil parishes of Aspley Guise and Aspley Heath which, despite being in the contiguous built-up area, are in Central Bedfordshire and thus outside the City of Milton Keynes.)

- Abbey Hill: Kiln Farm, Two Mile Ash, Wymbush
- Bletchley and Fenny Stratford: Brickfields, Central Bletchley, Denbigh, Mount Farm, Fenny Lock, Granby, Fenny Stratford, Newton Leys, Water Eaton
- Bradwell: Bradville, Bradwell, Bradwell Abbey, Bradwell Common, Bradwell village, Heelands, Rooksley
- Broughton and Milton Keynes – Atterbury, Brook Furlong, Broughton, Fox Milne, Middleton (includes Milton Keynes Village), (Note: So Milton Keynes (the village) is in Middleton (the grid square), which is in Milton Keynes (the civil parish), which is one of a number in Milton Keynes (the city), which in turn is in the City of Milton Keynes unitary authority district.) Northfield, Oakgrove, Pineham.
- Campbell Park (civil parish): Fishermead, Newlands, Oldbrook, Springfield, Willen and Willen Lake, Winterhill, The Woolstones
- Central Milton Keynes: Central MK, Campbell Park
- Fairfields
- Great Linford: Bolbeck Park, Blakelands, Conniburrow, Downs Barn, Downhead Park, Giffard Park, Great Linford, Neath Hill, Pennyland, Redhouse, Tongwell, Willen Park
- Kents Hill and Monkston: Brinklow, Kents Hill, Kingston, Monkston
- Loughton and Great Holm: Loughton, Loughton Lodge, Great Holm, Elfield Park, the Bowl
- New Bradwell
- Newport Pagnell
- Shenley Brook End: Emerson Valley, Furzton, Kingsmead, Shenley Brook End, Shenley Lodge, Snelshall, Tattenhoe, Tattenhoe Park, Westcroft
- Shenley Church End: Crownhill, Grange Farm, Hazeley, Medbourne, Oakhill, Oxley Park, Shenley Church End, Woodhill
- Simpson and Ashland: Ashland, Simpson, West Ashland
- Stantonbury: Bancroft/Bancroft Park, Blue Bridge, Bradville, Linford Wood, Oakridge Park, Stantonbury, Stantonbury Fields
- Stony Stratford: Fullers Slade, Galley Hill, Stony Stratford
- Walton: Caldecotte, Old Farm Park, Tilbrook, Tower Gate, Walnut Tree, Walton, Walton Hall, Walton Park, Wavendon Gate
- Wavendon: Wavendon, Eagle Farm, Glebe Farm
- West Bletchley: Far Bletchley, Old Bletchley, West Bletchley.
- Whitehouse
- Woburn Sands
- Wolverton and Greenleys: Greenleys, Stacey Bushes, Stonebridge, Wolverton, Old Wolverton
- Woughton: Beanhill, Bleak Hall, Coffee Hall, Eaglestone, Leadenhall, Netherfield, Peartree Bridge, Redmoor, Tinkers Bridge (part)
- Old Woughton: Passmore (part of Tinkers Bridge), Woughton on the Green, Woughton Park.

Bletchley, Central Milton Keynes, Fenny Stratford, Newport Pagnell, Stony Stratford, Woburn Sands and Wolverton are towns.

=== Rest of the borough ===
The rural area accounts for about 80% of the borough by area and about 10% by population. Olney is a town. These are the extra-urban civil parishes:

- Astwood and Hardmead
- Bow Brickhill
- Caldecote
- Calverton
- Castlethorpe
- Chicheley
- Clifton Reynes
- Cold Brayfield
- Emberton
- Filgrave
- Gayhurst
- Hanslope
- Haversham-cum-Little Linford
- Lathbury
- Lavendon
- Little Brickhill
- Long Street
- Moulsoe
- Newton Blossomville
- North Crawley
- Olney
- Ravenstone
- Sherington
- Stoke Goldington
- Tyringham
- Warrington
- Weston Underwood

=== Neighbourhood Plans ===
As of December 2023, the borough has 28 designated Neighbourhood Areas, of which 22 have made/adopted Neighbourhood Development Plans approved by the City Council, spanning both urban and rural parishes.

== Heritage assets ==
As of 2025 the National Heritage List for England includes 1,166 entries for heritage assets in the City of Milton Keynes. These comprise 1,111 listed buildings, of which 30 are at Grade I, 59 Grade II*, and 1,022 Grade II; 5 parks and gardens, of which 3 are grade II* and 2 Grade II; 49 Scheduled monuments; and 1 certificate of immunity from listing, for The Point.

== Freedom of the City ==
The following people and military units have received the Freedom of the City (from 2022) or Freedom of the Borough (1982–2021).

=== Individuals ===
- Jock Campbell, Baron Campbell of Eskan: 18 March 1982.
- James Marshall: 2009.
- Dame Cleo Laine: 2011.
- Peter Winkelman: 12 November 2015.
- Leah Williamson: 28 February 2023. (first recipient of the Freedom of the City rather than the Borough)
- Dean Lewington: 10 May 2025

=== Military Units ===
- The Royal Green Jackets: 1998.
  - The Rifles: 2007. (confirmation)
- 678 (Rifles) Squadron 6 Regiment Army Air Corps: 11 March 2018.

=== Organisations and businesses ===
- Red Bull Racing, 2014
