= Buckinghamshire Fire and Rescue Service =

Fire and rescue service in east of England

Operational area
- Country: England
- County: Buckinghamshire

Agency overview
- Established: 1 April 1997
- Annual calls: 8205 (2021-2022)
- Employees: 470 (2019)
- Annual budget: £28.9 million (2022)
- Chief Fire Officer: Louise Harrison
- Motto: Making A Difference Together

Facilities and equipment
- Stations: 19
- Engines: 30

Website
- bucksfire.gov.uk

Buckinghamshire Fire and Rescue Service is the Local Authority Fire Service serving the English unitary authorities of Buckinghamshire and the City of Milton Keynes.

The combined fire authority became operational on 1 April 1997 as a result of the Buckinghamshire Fire Services (Combination Scheme) Order 1996, which was approved in November 1996.

== Performance ==
Every fire and rescue service in England and Wales is periodically subjected to a statutory inspection by His Majesty's Inspectorate of Constabulary and Fire & Rescue Services (HMICFRS). Services are assessed as 'Outstanding', 'Good', 'Adequate', 'Requires Improvement' or 'Inadequate' in 11 areas.

In the inspection for 2023-2025 one category (Responding to major incidents) was found to be 'Adequate', one category (Public safety through fire regulation) was found to be 'Inadequate' and the remaining 9 categories were found to be 'Requires improvement'.

== Fire stations and appliances ==
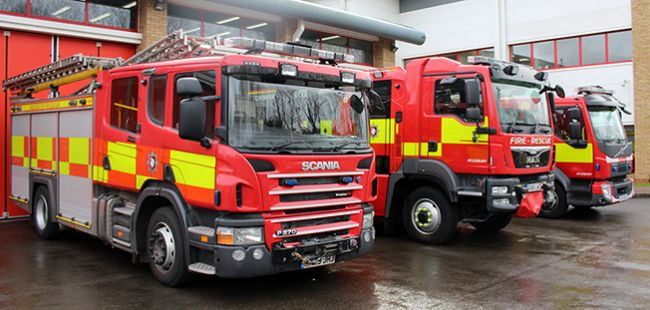
Buckinghamshire Fire and Rescue appliances

Buckinghamshire Fire and Rescue Service operates 19 fire stations, of which two are crewed day and night by wholetime firefighters, ten are crewed by on-call firefighters who live near to their fire station and can arrive there within ten minutes of a call being received, and seven are crewed by a combination of wholetime and on-call firefighters. Buckinghamshire Fire and Rescue Service also operate a pool of "flexi-firefighters" who fill in gaps in wholetime crewing.

=== Blue Light Hub ===
On 10 February 2016, Buckinghamshire and Milton Keynes Fire Authority (BMKFA) approved plans for a new combined station to be used alongside Thames Valley Police, South Central Ambulance Service, and NHS Blood and Transplant, named the "Blue Light Hub" to be built. The new station is intended to house over 200 fire, police, and ambulance staff who will be relocating from various locations across Milton Keynes to work together in one central location.

On 30 June 2020, fire crews from Great Holm and Bletchley fire stations moved into the new West Ashland fire station, inside the Blue Light Hub.

== See also ==
- List of British firefighters killed in the line of duty
