= Milton Keynes =

City in Buckinghamshire, England

Coordinates: 52.04°N 0.76°W

- City
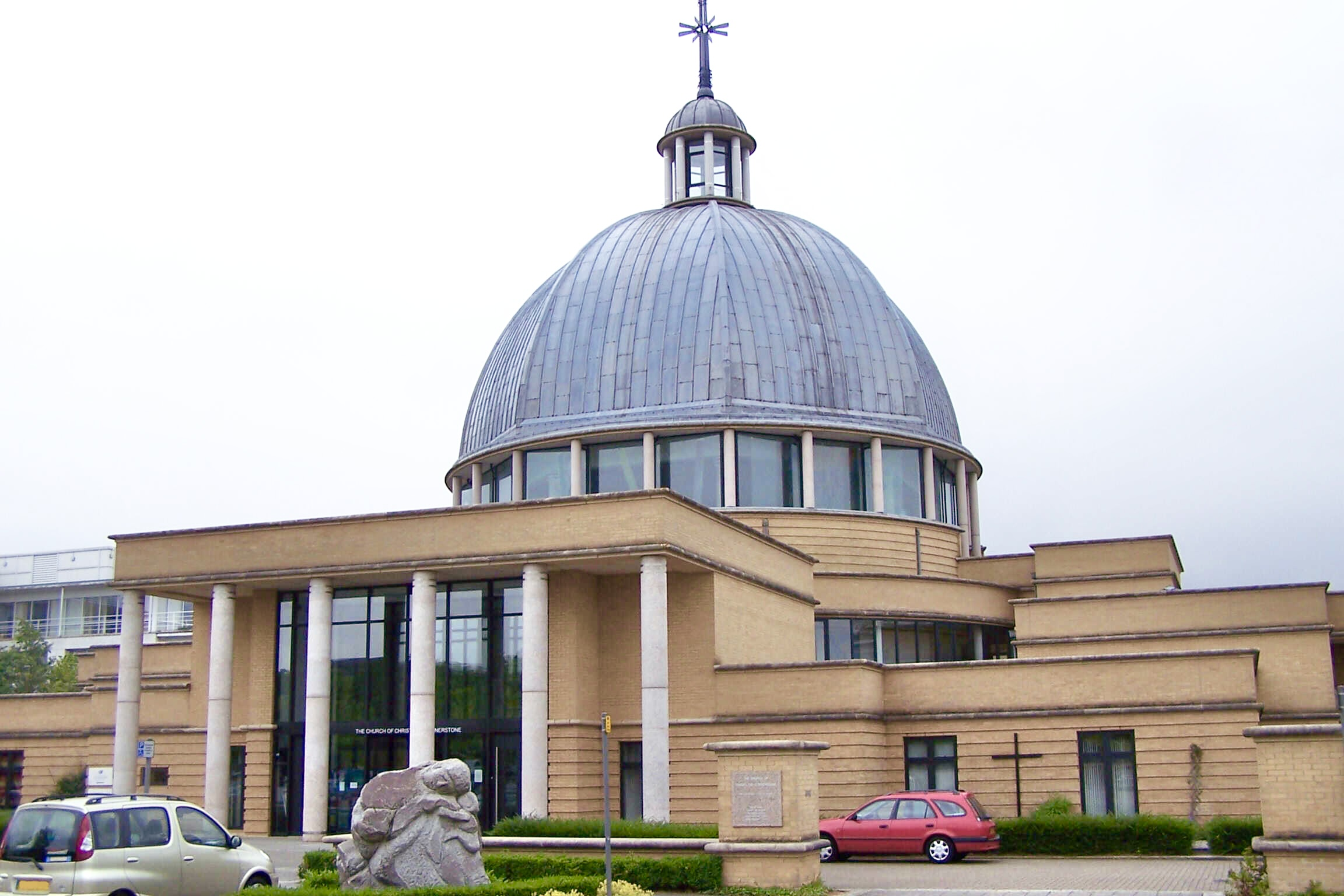
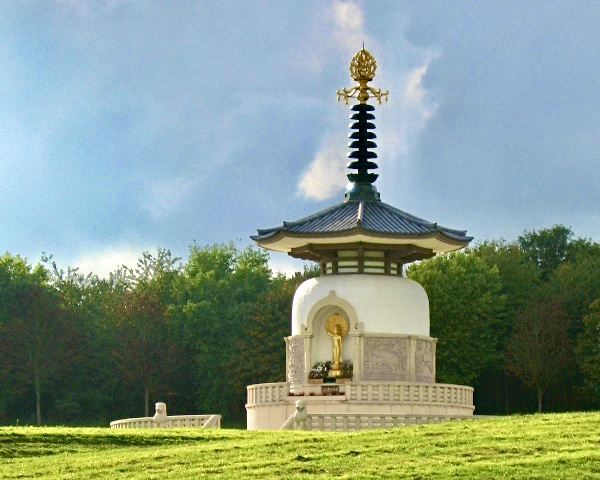
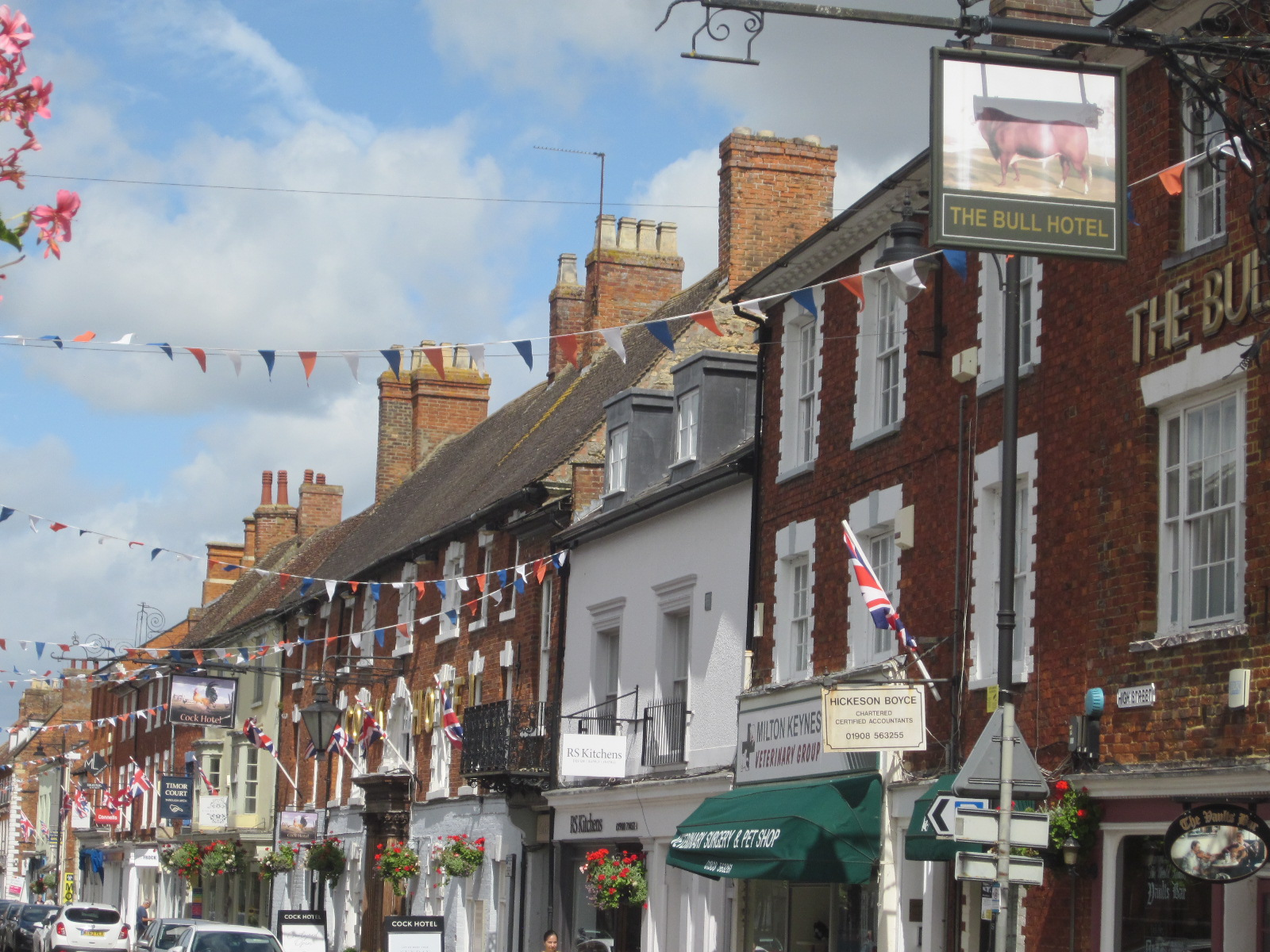
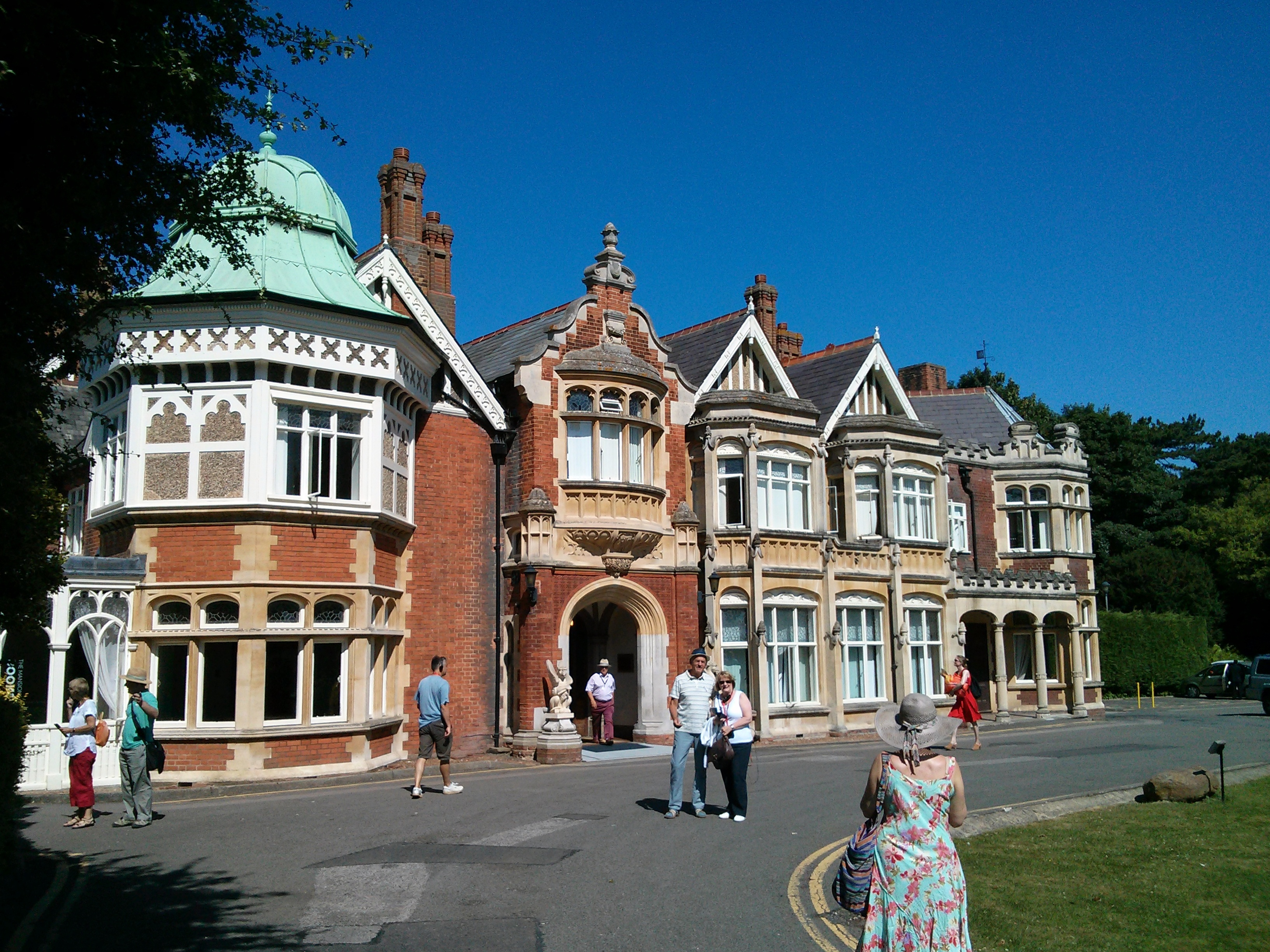
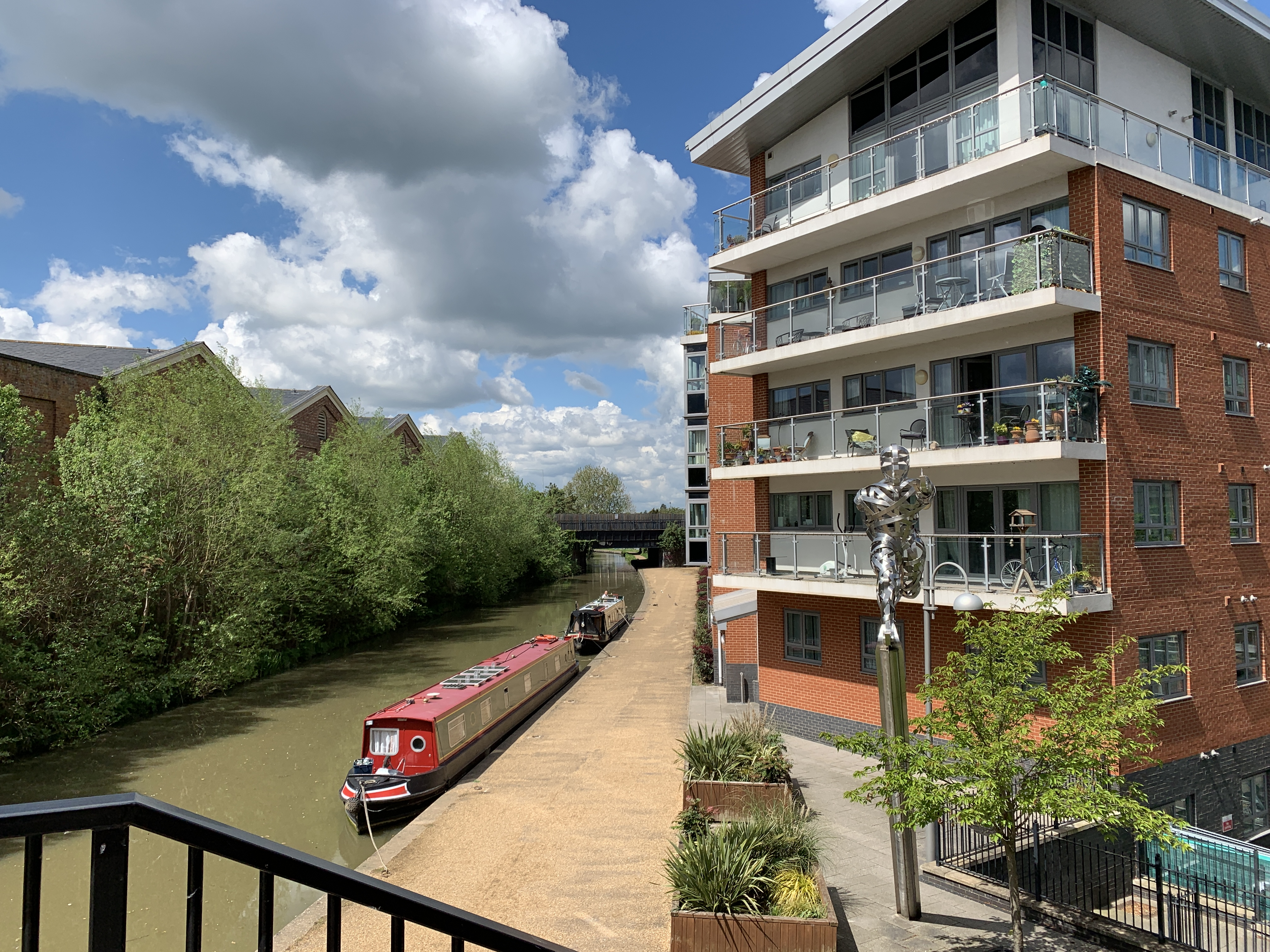
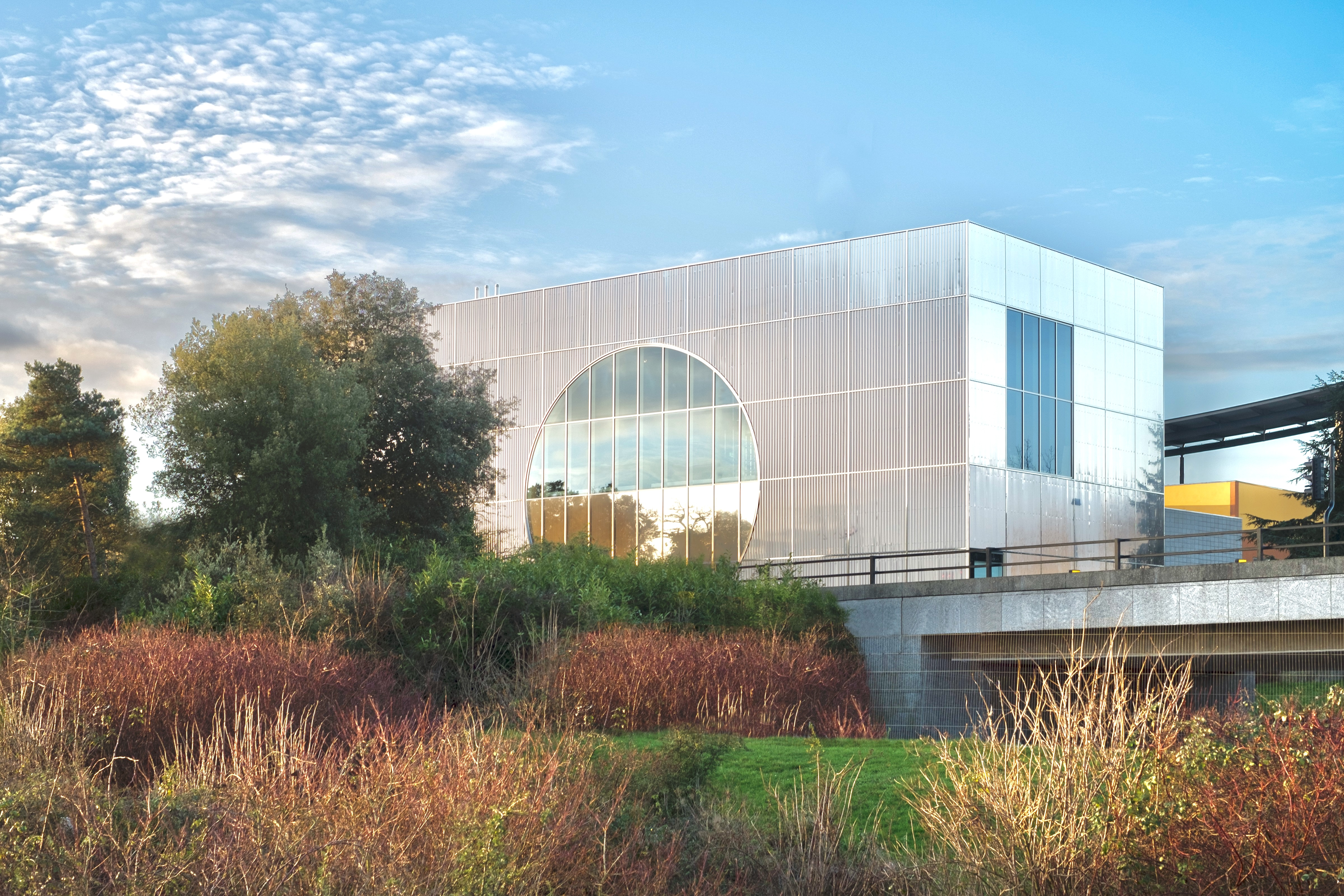
- Church of Christ the Cornerstone The Peace Pagoda Stony Stratford High Street Bletchley Park Grand Union Canal at Wolverton Milton Keynes Gallery

- Location within Buckinghamshire
- Interactive map of Milton Keynes
- Founded: 23 January 1967 (Note: Date of the "new town designation order")
- OS grid reference: SP841386
  - London: 46 mi (74 km) (Note: From the Church of Christ the Cornerstone to the "Mileage Central Point of London Plaque" at Charing Cross, the "as the crow flies" distance is 46.5 miles or 73.4 km. From Milton Keynes Bowl to Marble Arch via Watling Street is 46 miles (74 km). By rail from Milton Keynes Central to Euston is 49 miles 65 chains (49.81 mi; 80.17 km). From Central Milton Keynes to Charing Cross via the M1 motorway is 55 miles (89 km).) SSE
- District: City of Milton Keynes
- Unitary authority: Milton Keynes City Council
- Ceremonial county: Buckinghamshire
- Region: South East
- Country: England
- Sovereign state: United Kingdom
- Post town: MILTON KEYNES
- Postcode district: MK1–15, MK17, MK19
- Dialling code: 01908
- Police: Thames Valley
- Fire: Buckinghamshire
- Ambulance: South Central
- UK Parliament: Milton Keynes North; Milton Keynes Central; Buckingham and Bletchley
- Website: milton-keynes.gov.uk

Milton Keynes (/kiːnz/ KEENZ) is a city in Buckinghamshire, England, about 50 miles (80 km) north-west of London. At the 2021 census, the population of its urban area was 264,349. The River Great Ouse forms the northern boundary of the urban area; a tributary, the River Ouzel, meanders through its linear parks and balancing lakes. Approximately 25% of the urban area is parkland or woodland, including two Sites of Special Scientific Interest (SSSIs). By design, the city comprises many well-delineated neighbourhoods.

In the 1960s, the government decided that a further generation of new towns in the south east of England was needed to relieve housing congestion in London. Milton Keynes was to be the biggest yet, with a population of 250,000 and area of 22,000 acres (9,000 ha). At designation, its area incorporated the existing towns of Bletchley, Fenny Stratford, Wolverton and Stony Stratford, (Note: The adjacent towns of Newport Pagnell and Woburn Sands were not included in the original 1967 designated area of the new town but have become part of the Milton Keynes urban area since then.) along with another fifteen villages and farmland in between. These settlements had an extensive historical record since the Norman Conquest; detailed archaeological investigations before development revealed evidence of human occupation from the Neolithic period, including the Milton Keynes Hoard of Bronze Age gold jewellery. The government established Milton Keynes Development Corporation (MKDC) to design and deliver this new city. The Corporation decided on a softer, more human-scaled landscape than in the earlier English new towns but with an emphatically modernist architecture. Recognising how traditional towns and cities had become choked in traffic, they established a grid of distributor roads about 1 km (0.6 mi) between edges, leaving the spaces between to develop more organically. An extensive network of shared-use paths for leisure cyclists and pedestrians criss-crosses through and between them. Rejecting the residential tower block concept that had become unpopular, they set a height limit of three storeys outside Central Milton Keynes.

Facilities include a 1,400-seat theatre, a municipal art gallery, two multiplex cinemas, an ecumenical central church, a 400-seat concert hall, a teaching hospital, a 30,500-seat football stadium, an indoor ski-slope and a 65,000-capacity open-air concert venue. Seven railway stations serve the Milton Keynes urban area (one inter-city). The Open University is based here and there is a small campus of the University of Bedfordshire. Most major sports are represented at amateur level; Red Bull Racing (Formula One), MK Dons (association football), and Milton Keynes Lightning (ice hockey) are its professional teams. The Peace Pagoda overlooking Willen Lake was the first such to be built in Europe. The many works of sculpture in parks and public spaces include the iconic Concrete Cows at Milton Keynes Museum.

Milton Keynes is among the most economically productive localities in the UK, ranking highly across a number of criteria. It has the UK's fifth-highest number of business startups per capita (but equally of business failures). It is home to several major national and international companies. Despite economic success and personal wealth for some, there are pockets of nationally significant poverty. The employment profile is composed of about 90% service industries and 9% manufacturing.

== History ==
=== Birth of a "new city" ===
It may startle some political economists to talk of commencing the building of new cities ... planned as cities from their first foundation, and not mere small towns and villages. ... A time will arrive when something of this sort must be done ... England cannot escape from the alternative of new city building.

— T. J. Maslen, 1843

In the 1960s, the UK government decided that a further generation of new towns in the South East of England was needed to relieve housing congestion in London. Since the 1950s, overspill housing for several London boroughs had been constructed in Bletchley. Further studies in the 1960s identified north Buckinghamshire as a possible site for a large new town, a new city, (Note: The Plan for Milton Keynes begins (in the Foreword by Lord ("Jock") Campbell of Eskan): "This plan for building the new city of Milton Keynes ... ") encompassing the existing towns of Bletchley, Stony Stratford, and Wolverton. The New Town (informally and in planning documents, "New City") was to be the biggest yet, with a target population of 250,000, in a "designated area" of 21,883 acres (8,855.7 ha). The name "Milton Keynes" was taken from that of an existing village on the site.

On 23 January 1967, when the formal "new town designation order" was made, the area to be developed was largely farmland and undeveloped villages. The site was deliberately located equidistant from London, Birmingham, Leicester, Oxford, and Cambridge, with the intention that it would be self-sustaining and eventually become a major regional centre in its own right. Planning control was taken from elected local authorities and delegated to the Milton Keynes Development Corporation (MKDC). Before construction began, every area was subject to detailed archaeological investigation: doing so has exposed a rich history of human settlement since Neolithic times and has provided a unique insight into the history of a large sample of the landscape of North Buckinghamshire.

The corporation's strongly modernist designs were regularly featured in the magazines Architectural Design and the Architects' Journal. MKDC was determined to learn from the mistakes made in the earlier new towns, and revisit the garden city ideals. They set in place the characteristic grid roads that run between districts ("grid squares"), as well as a programme of intensive planting, balancing lakes and parkland. Central Milton Keynes ("CMK") was not intended to be a traditional town centre but a central business and shopping district to supplement local centres embedded in most of the grid squares. This non-hierarchical devolved city plan was a departure from the English new towns tradition and envisaged a wide range of industry and diversity of housing styles and tenures. The largest and almost the last of the British New Towns, Milton Keynes has "stood the test of time far better than most, and has proved flexible and adaptable". The radical grid plan was inspired by the work of Melvin M. Webber, described by the founding architect of Milton Keynes, Derek Walker, as the "father of the city". Webber thought that telecommunications meant that the old idea of a city as a concentric cluster was out of date and that cities which enabled people to travel around them readily would be the thing of the future, achieving "community without propinquity" for residents.

The government wound up MKDC in 1992, 25 years after the new town was founded. Control was transferred to the Commission for New Towns (CNT) and then finally to English Partnerships, with planning functions returning to the local council (Milton Keynes Borough (now City) Council). From 2004 to 2011 a government quango, the Milton Keynes Partnership, had development control powers to accelerate the growth of Milton Keynes.

=== Formal award of city status ===
Along with many other towns and boroughs, Milton Keynes competed (unsuccessfully) for formal city status in the 2000, 2002 and 2012 competitions. However the Borough (including rural areas, in addition to the MK urban area) was successful in 2022, in the Queen's Platinum Jubilee Civic Honours competition. On 15 August 2022, the Crown Office in Chancery announced formally that Queen Elizabeth II had ordained by letters patent that the Borough of Milton Keynes has been given city status. In law, it is the Borough rather than its eponymous settlement that has city status; nevertheless it is the latter that is more commonly known as the city.

=== Name ===
Labour Minister Dick Crossman ... looked at [a] map and saw [the] name and said "Milton the poet, Keynes the economic one. 'Planning with economic sense and idealism, a very good name for it.'"

— Jock Campbell, Baron Campbell of Eskan

The name "Milton Keynes" was a reuse of the name of one of the original historic villages in the designated area, now more generally known as "Milton Keynes Village" to distinguish it from the modern settlement. A century after the Norman invasion, the manor transferred by marriage to Hugh de Kaynes, whose family held it to the late 13th century (as well as others in the country – Ashton Keynes in Wiltshire, Somerford Keynes in Gloucestershire, and Horsted Keynes in West Sussex). The village was originally known as Middeltone (11th century); then later as Middelton Kaynes or Caynes (13th century); Milton Keynes (15th century); and Milton alias Middelton Gaynes (17th century).

=== Prior history ===
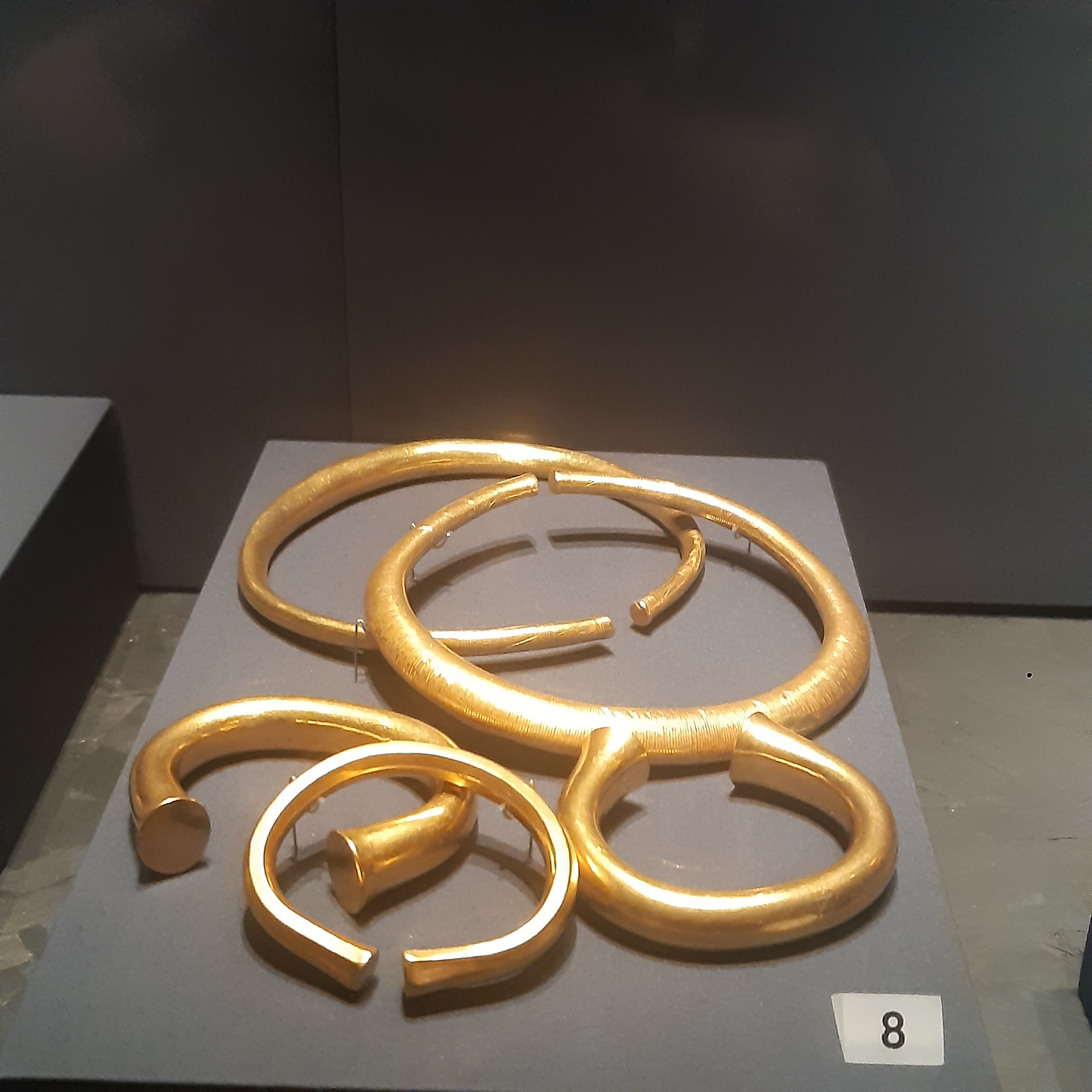
The Milton Keynes Hoard of torcs and bracelets, on display at the British Museum

The area that was to become Milton Keynes encompassed a landscape that has a rich historic legacy. The area to be developed was largely farmland and undeveloped villages, but with evidence of permanent settlement dating back to the Bronze Age. Before construction began, every area was subject to detailed archaeological investigation: this work has provided an insight into the history of a very large sample of the landscape of south-central England. There is evidence of Stone Age, late Bronze Age/early Iron Age, Romano-British, Anglo-Saxon, Anglo-Norman, Medieval, and late Industrial Revolution settlements such as the railway towns of Wolverton (with its railway works) and Bletchley (at the junction of the London and North Western Railway with the Oxford–Cambridge Varsity Line). The most notable archaeological artefact was the Milton Keynes Hoard, which the British Museum described as "one of the biggest concentrations of Bronze Age gold known from Britain and seems to flaunt wealth".

Bletchley Park, the site of World War II Allied code-breaking and Colossus, the world's first programmable electronic digital computer, is a major component of MK's modern history. It is now a heritage attraction, receiving hundreds of thousands of visitors annually.

When the boundary of Milton Keynes was defined in 1967, some 40,000 people lived in four towns and fifteen villages or hamlets in the "designated area".

== Geography ==
=== Location and nearest settlements ===
Milton Keynes is in south central England, at the northern end of the South East England region, about 50 miles (80 km) north-west of London.

The nearest large (Note: population over 50,000.) towns are Northampton, Bedford, Luton and Aylesbury. The nearest large (Note: population over 100,000. St Albans, a cathedral city of 57,000, is closer.) cities are Coventry, Leicester, Cambridge, London and Oxford.

=== Geology ===
Its surface geology is primarily gently rolling Oxford clay or, more formally:

... a portion of more or less dissected boulder clay plateau, with streams falling fairly steeply to the [Great] Ouse and Ouzel flood plains, across slopes cut chiefly in Oxford clay. Middle Jurassic rocks, in particular the Blisworth limestone and cornbrash, form strong features in the lands bordering the Ouse valley in the north.

Its highest points are in the centre (110 m; 360 ft) and at Woodhill on the western boundary (120 m; 390 ft). The lowest point of the urban area is in Newport Pagnell, where the Ouzel joins the Great Ouse (50 m; 160 ft).

=== Parks and environmental infrastructure ===
Because of the (poorly drained) clay soils and the urban hard surfaces, the development corporation identified water runoff into the Ouzel and its tributaries as a significant risk to be managed and so put in place two large balancing lakes (Caldecotte and Willen) and a number of smaller detention ponds. These provide an important leisure amenity for most of the year. Building in the floodplains of the Ouse and Ouzel was precluded too, thus providing long-distance linear parks that are within easy reach of most residents.

The north basin of Willen Lake is a bird sanctuary, with a Peace Pagoda and Buddhist temple by the lake.

The two Sites of Special Scientific Interest, Howe Park Wood and Oxley Mead, are the most significant of a number of important wildlife sites in and around MK.

Just outside the Milton Keynes urban area lies Little Linford Wood, a conservation site and nature reserve managed by the Berkshire, Buckinghamshire and Oxfordshire Wildlife Trust. It is considered to be one of the best habitats for dormice.

=== Climate ===
Milton Keynes experiences an oceanic climate (Köppen climate classification Cfb) as is typical of almost all of the United Kingdom.

The nearest Met Office weather station is in Woburn, Bedfordshire, just outside the south eastern fringe of Milton Keynes. (Note: The Woburn weather station is located about 7.0 miles (11.3 km) from the Milton Keynes city centre. There is another station at Stowe, just outside Buckingham about 12 miles (19 km) distant. On 19 July 2022, the temperature here reached 38.7 °C (101.7 °F).) Recorded temperature extremes range from 39.6 °C (103.3 °F) during July 2022, to as low as −20.6 °C (−5.1 °F) on 25 February 1947; this is the lowest temperature ever reported in England in February.

Climate data for Woburn, (1991–2020 normals, extremes 1898–present)
Month	Jan	Feb	Mar	Apr	May	Jun	Jul	Aug	Sep	Oct	Nov	Dec	Year
Record high °C (°F)	15.0 (59.0)	18.9 (66.0)	22.8 (73.0)	27.1 (80.8)	32.9 (91.2)	33.3 (91.9)	39.6 (103.3)	35.5 (95.9)	32.8 (91.0)	27.3 (81.1)	19.4 (66.9)	16.0 (60.8)	39.6 (103.3)
Mean daily maximum °C (°F)	7.4 (45.3)	8.0 (46.4)	10.6 (51.1)	13.8 (56.8)	17.0 (62.6)	20.0 (68.0)	22.4 (72.3)	22.1 (71.8)	19.0 (66.2)	14.7 (58.5)	10.3 (50.5)	7.7 (45.9)	14.4 (57.9)
Daily mean °C (°F)	4.5 (40.1)	4.8 (40.6)	6.7 (44.1)	9.0 (48.2)	11.9 (53.4)	14.9 (58.8)	17.2 (63.0)	17.1 (62.8)	14.4 (57.9)	11.0 (51.8)	7.2 (45.0)	4.8 (40.6)	10.3 (50.5)
Mean daily minimum °C (°F)	1.6 (34.9)	1.5 (34.7)	2.7 (36.9)	4.1 (39.4)	6.8 (44.2)	9.8 (49.6)	11.9 (53.4)	12.0 (53.6)	9.8 (49.6)	7.3 (45.1)	4.1 (39.4)	1.8 (35.2)	6.1 (43.0)
Record low °C (°F)	−20.0 (−4.0)	−20.6 (−5.1)	−15.0 (5.0)	−7.3 (18.9)	−5.6 (21.9)	−1.1 (30.0)	1.2 (34.2)	1.7 (35.1)	−2.8 (27.0)	−7.8 (18.0)	−13.9 (7.0)	−17.4 (0.7)	−20.6 (−5.1)
Average precipitation mm (inches)	55.4 (2.18)	44.6 (1.76)	39.6 (1.56)	48.3 (1.90)	51.9 (2.04)	54.2 (2.13)	51.2 (2.02)	58.6 (2.31)	55.4 (2.18)	70.7 (2.78)	64.5 (2.54)	58.2 (2.29)	655.3 (25.80)
Average precipitation days (≥ 1.0 mm)	11.7	10.0	9.3	9.7	8.7	9.2	8.5	9.4	9.1	11.0	11.7	11.5	119.7
Mean monthly sunshine hours	53.0	72.3	114.9	152.2	191.5	185.7	198.4	185.3	141.6	104.5	62.0	48.3	1,509.4
Source 1: Met Office
Source 2: Starlings Roost Weather

== Urban design ==
The radical plan, form and scale of Milton Keynes attracted international attention. Early phases of development include work by celebrated architects, including Sir Richard MacCormac, Norman Foster, Henning Larsen, Ralph Erskine, John Winter, and Martin Richardson. Led by Lord Campbell of Eskan (chairman) and Fred Roche (General Manager), the Corporation attracted talented young architects, led by the respected designer, Derek Walker. In the modernist Miesian tradition is the Shopping Building designed by Stuart Mosscrop and Christopher Woodward, a grade II listed building, which the Twentieth Century Society called the "most distinguished" twentieth century retail building in Britain. The Development Corporation also led an ambitious public art programme.

The urban design has not been universally praised. In 1980, the then president of the Royal Town Planning Institute, Francis Tibbalds, described Central Milton Keynes as "bland, rigid, sterile, and totally boring." Michael Edwards, a member of the original consultancy team, (Note: and erstwhile lecturer in urban planning at University College London) believes that there were weaknesses in their proposal and that the Development Corporation implemented it badly.

=== Grid roads and grid squares ===
The geography of Milton Keynes – the railway line, Watling Street, Grand Union Canal, M1 motorway – sets up a very strong north-south axis. If you've got to build a city between (them), it is very natural to take a pen and draw the rungs of a ladder. Ten miles by six is the size of this city – 22,000 acres. Do you lay it out like an American city, rigid orthogonal from side to side? Being more sensitive in 1966–7, the designers decided that the grid concept should apply but should be a lazy grid following the flow of land, its valleys, its ebbs and flows. That would be nicer to look at, more economical and efficient to build, and would sit more beautifully as a landscape intervention.

— David Lock

The Milton Keynes Development Corporation planned the major road layout according to street hierarchy principles, using a grid pattern of approximately 1 km (0.6 mi) intervals, rather than on the more conventional radial pattern found in older settlements. Major distributor roads run between communities, rather than through them: these distributor roads are known locally as grid roads and the spaces between them – the neighbourhoods – are known as grid squares (though few are actually square or even rectilinear). This spacing was chosen so that people would always be within six minutes' walking distance of a grid-road bus-stop. (Note: In reality, the bus operators have specified many bus routes that go through, rather than between, neighbourhoods.) Consequently, each grid square is a semi-autonomous community, making a unique collective of 100 clearly identifiable neighbourhoods within the overall urban environment. (Note: Bendixson & Platt report the Corporation as concerned at this outcome, which was an unanticipated emergent behaviour. In later developments, it aimed for increased permeability through the grid.) The grid squares have a variety of development styles, ranging from conventional urban development and industrial parks to original rural and modern urban and suburban developments. Most grid squares have a local centre, intended as a retail hub, and many have community facilities as well. Each of the original villages is the heart of its own grid-square. Originally intended under the master plan to sit alongside the grid roads, these local centres were mostly in fact built embedded in the communities.

Although the 1970 master plan assumed cross-road junctions, roundabout junctions were built at intersections because this type of junction is more efficient at dealing with small to medium volumes. Some major roads are dual carriageway, the others are single carriageway. Along one side of each single carriageway grid road, there is usually a (grassed) reservation to permit dualling or additional transport infrastructure at a later date. (Note: An additional ten-metre wide strip was originally specified to satisfy Buckinghamshire County Council's belief in a future fixed-track public transport system. In 1977 MKDC decided to cease to specify it.) As of 2018, this has been limited to some dualling. The edges of each grid square are landscaped and densely planted – some additionally have noise attenuation mounds – to minimise traffic noise from the grid road impacting the adjacent grid square. Traffic movements are fast, with relatively little congestion since there are alternative routes to any particular destination other than during peak periods. The national speed limit applies on the grid roads, although lower speed limits have been introduced on some stretches to reduce accident rates. Pedestrians rarely need to cross grid roads at grade, as underpasses and bridges were specified at frequent places along each stretch of all of the grid roads. In contrast, the later districts planned by English Partnerships have departed from this model, without a road hierarchy but with conventional junctions with traffic lights and at grade pedestrian crossings. (Note: The "western expansion area" is what became Fairfields and Whitehouse. The "eastern expansion area" is Broughton including Brooklands. "The Hub" is a development of residential tower, hotels and restaurants in CMK.)

=== Redways ===
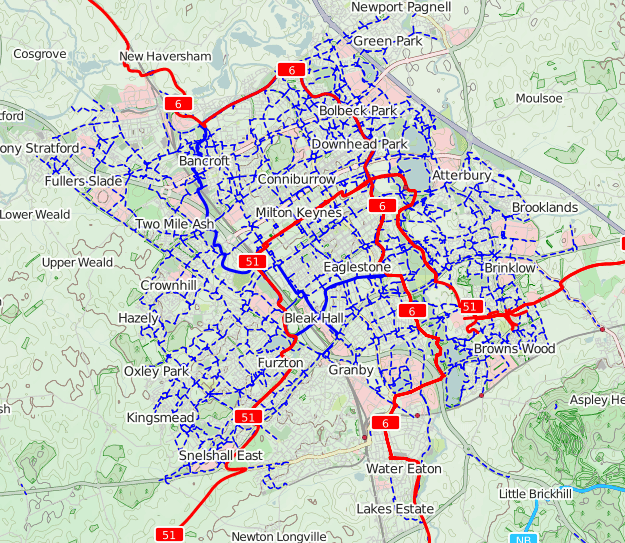
Cycleway network in Milton Keynes. The national cycle routes are highlighted in red.

There is a separate network (approximately 170 miles (270 km) total length) of cycle and pedestrian routes – the redways – that runs through the grid-squares and often runs alongside the grid-road network. This was designed to segregate slow moving cycle and pedestrian traffic from fast moving motor traffic. In practice, it is mainly used for leisure cycling rather than commuting, perhaps because the cycle routes are shared with pedestrians, cross the grid-roads via bridge or underpass rather than at grade, and because some take meandering scenic routes rather than straight lines. It is so called because it is generally surfaced with red tarmac. The national Sustrans national cycle network routes 6 and 51 take advantage of this system.

=== Height ===
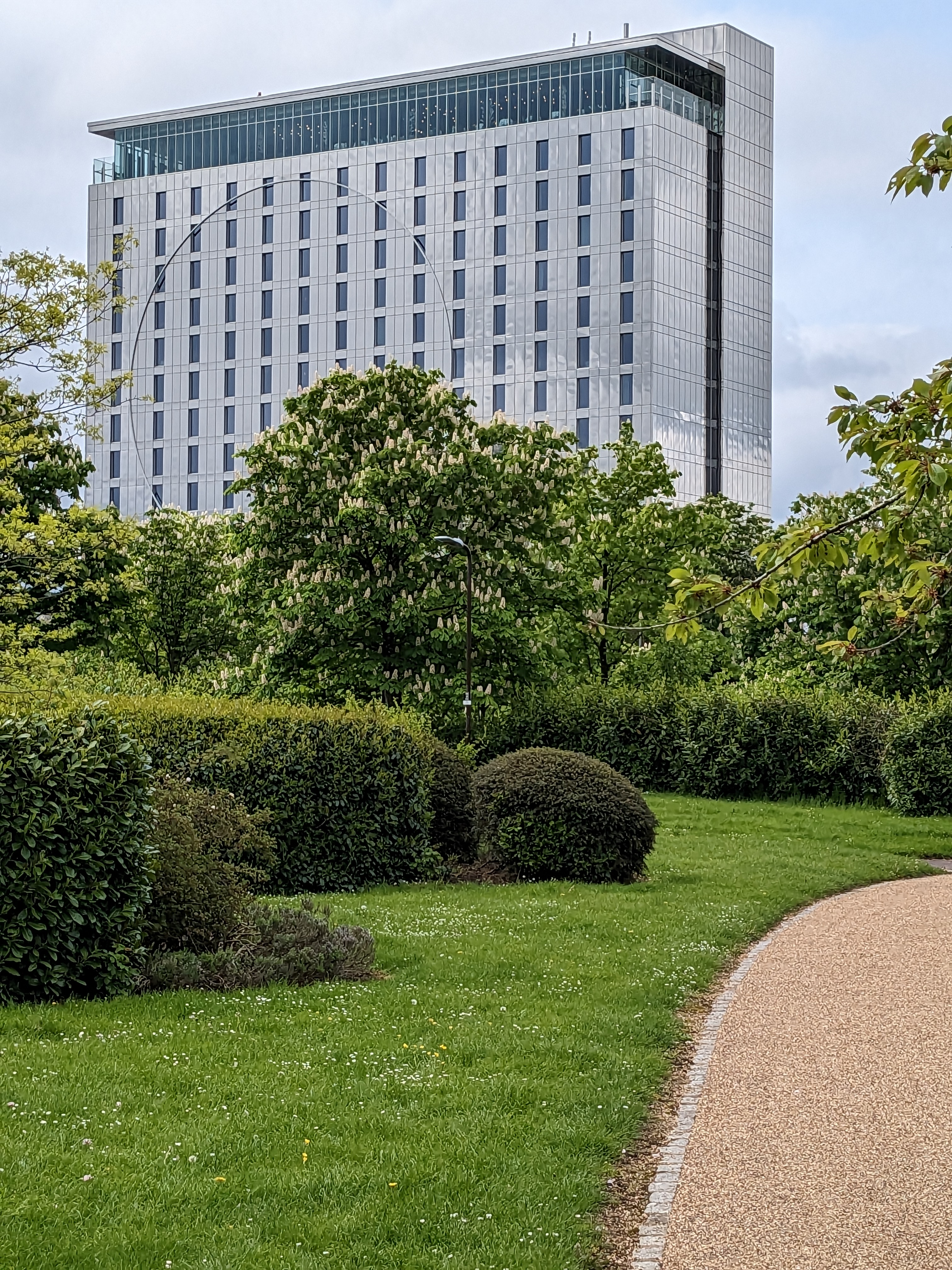
The fourteen-storey Hotel LaTour, the tallest building in the city, overlooks Campbell Park in CMK.

The original design guidance declared that commercial building heights in the centre should not exceed six storeys, with a limit of three storeys for houses (elsewhere), paraphrased locally as "no building taller than the tallest tree". In contrast, the Milton Keynes Partnership, in its expansion plans for Milton Keynes, believed that Central Milton Keynes (and elsewhere) needed "landmark buildings" and subsequently lifted the height restriction for the area. As a result, high rise buildings have been built in the central business district. (Note: Large-scale buildings include Jurys Inn (10 storeys) The Pinnacle:MK on Midsummer Boulevard (9 storeys) and the Vizion development on Avebury Boulevard (12 storeys),) As of 2014, local plans have protected the existing boulevard framework and set higher standards for architectural excellence. (Note: The Network Rail National Centre is at the western limit of Silbury Boulevard near the Central station; this building complex occupies a large land area but only rises to the equivalent of six storeys; The Hotel la Tour (Marlborough Gate and Midsummer Bvd) opens April 2022 and is 50 metres tall.)

=== Linear parks ===
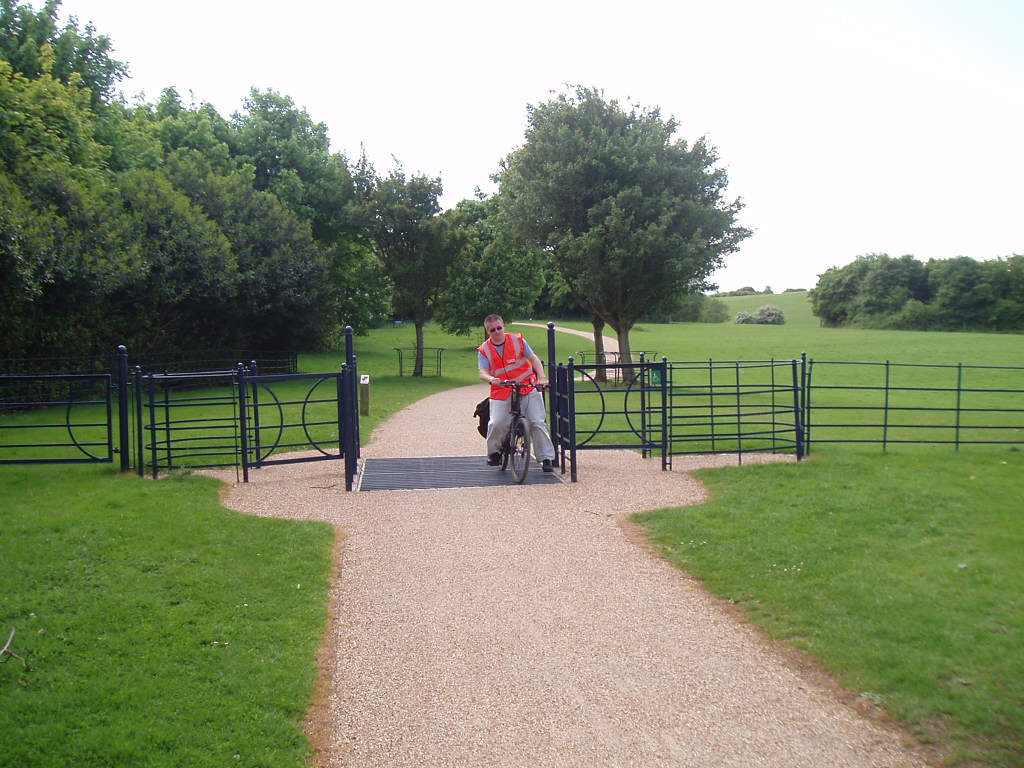
A section of linear park, showing cyclists crossing a cattle grid on National Cycle Route 51

The floodplains of the Great Ouse and of its tributaries (the Ouzel and some brooks) have been protected as linear parks that run right through Milton Keynes; these were identified as important landscape and flood-management assets from the outset. At 4,100 acres (1,650 ha) – ten times larger than London's Hyde Park and a third larger than Richmond Park – the landscape architects realised that the Royal Parks model would not be appropriate or affordable and drew on their National Park experience. As Bendixson and Platt (1992) write: "They divided the Ouzel Valley into 'strings, beads and settings'. The 'strings' are well-maintained routes, be they for walking, bicycling or riding; the 'beads' are sports centres, lakeside cafes and other activity areas; the 'settings' are self-managed land-uses such as woods, riding paddocks, a golf course and a farm".

The Grand Union Canal is another green route (and demonstrates the level geography of the area – there is just one minor lock in its entire 10-mile (16 km) meandering route through from the southern boundary near Fenny Stratford to the "Iron Trunk" aqueduct over the Ouse at Wolverton at its northern boundary).

The initial park system was planned by Peter Youngman (Chief Landscape Architect), who also developed landscape precepts for all development areas: groups of grid squares were to be planted with different selections of trees and shrubs to give them distinct identities. The detailed planning and landscape design of parks and of the grid roads was evolved under the leadership of Neil Higson, who from 1977 took over from Youngman.

In a national comparison of urban areas by open space available to residents, Milton Keynes ranked highest in the UK. Milton Keynes is unusual in that most of the parks are owned and managed by a charity, the Milton Keynes Parks Trust rather than the local authority, to ensure that the management of the city's green spaces is largely independent of the council's expenditure priorities.

=== Forest city concept ===
The Development Corporation's original design concept aimed for a "forest city" and its foresters planted millions of trees from its own nursery in Newlands in the following years. Parks, lakes and green spaces cover about 25% of Milton Keynes; as of 2018, there are 22 million trees and shrubs in public open spaces. When the Development Corporation was being wound up, it transferred the major parks, lakes, river-banks and grid-road margins to the Parks Trust, a charity which is independent of the municipal authority. MKDC endowed the Parks Trust with a portfolio of commercial properties, the income from which pays for the upkeep of the green spaces. As of 2018, approximately 25% of the urban area is parkland or woodland. It includes two Sites of Special Scientific Interest, Howe Park Wood and Oxley Mead.

=== Centre ===
As a key element of the planners' vision, Milton Keynes has a purpose built centre, with a very large "covered high street" shopping centre, a theatre, municipal art gallery, a multiplex cinema, hotels, central business district, an ecumenical church, Milton Keynes Civic Offices and central railway station.

Campbell Park, a formal park extending east from the business area to the Grand Union Canal, is described in the Pevsner Architectural Guides as "...the largest and most imaginative park to have been laid out in Britain in the 20th century". The park is listed (grade 2) by Historic England,

=== Original towns and villages ===
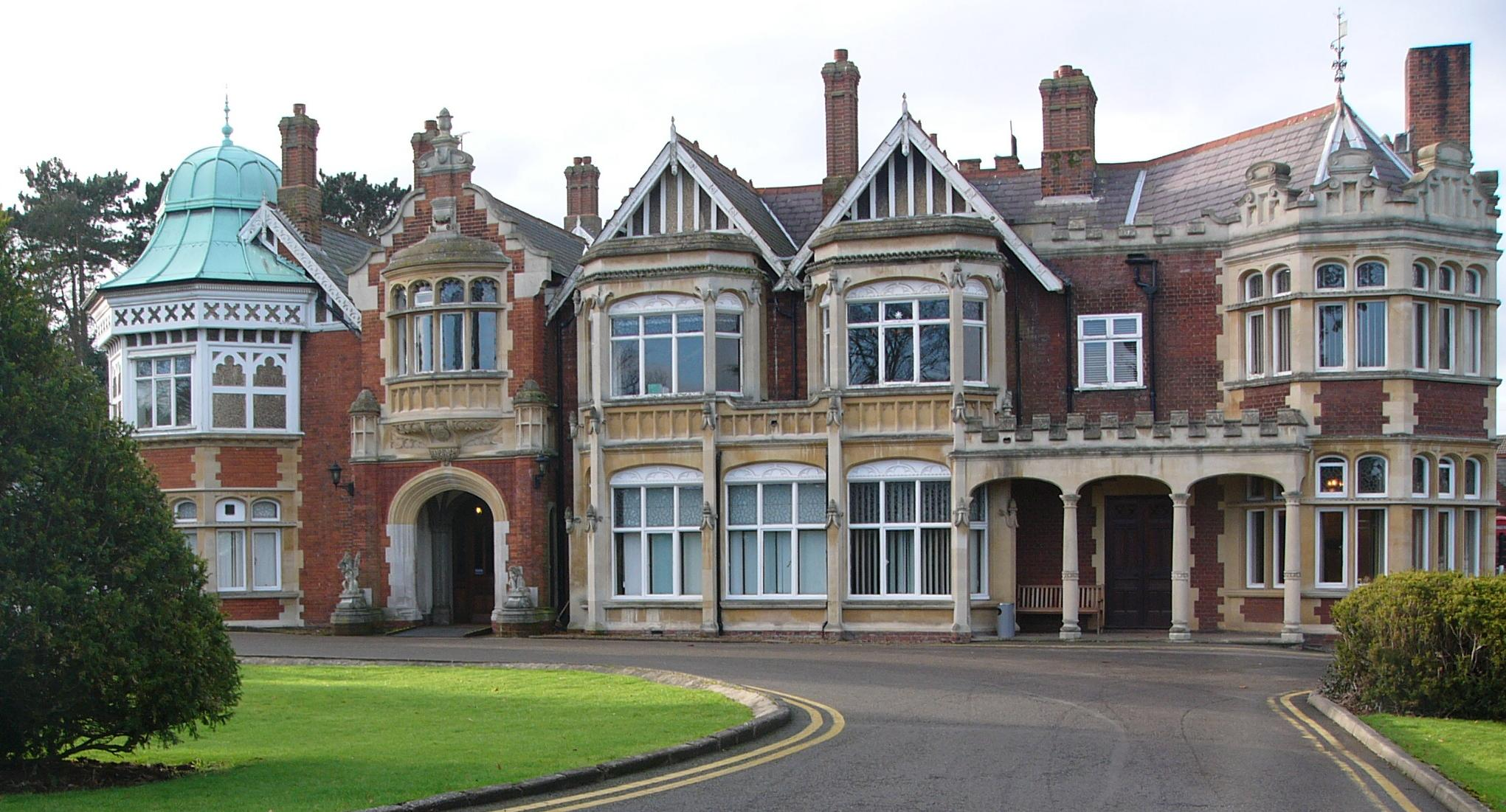
During World War II, British and American cryptographers at Bletchley Park broke a large number of Axis codes and ciphers, including the German Enigma and Lorenz ciphers.

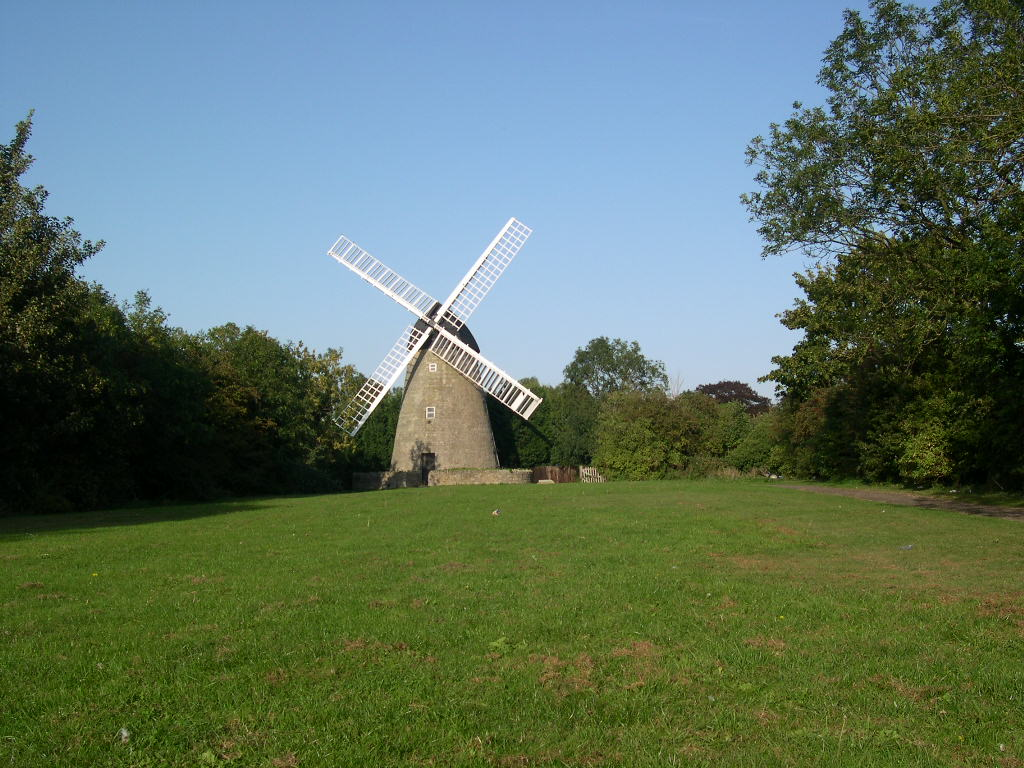
The 1815 windmill near New Bradwell village, beside the playing fields

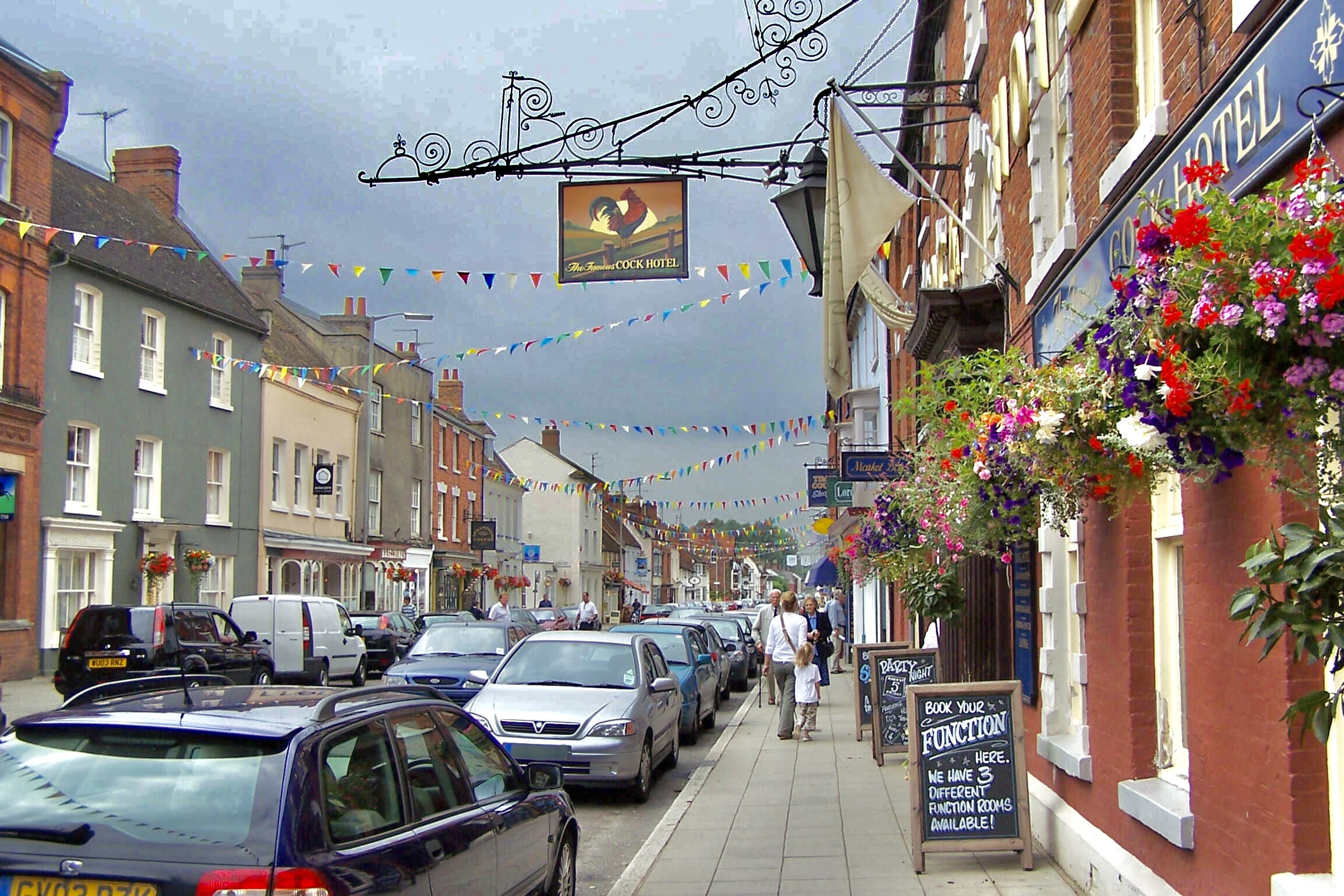
Stony Stratford high street in festive mood

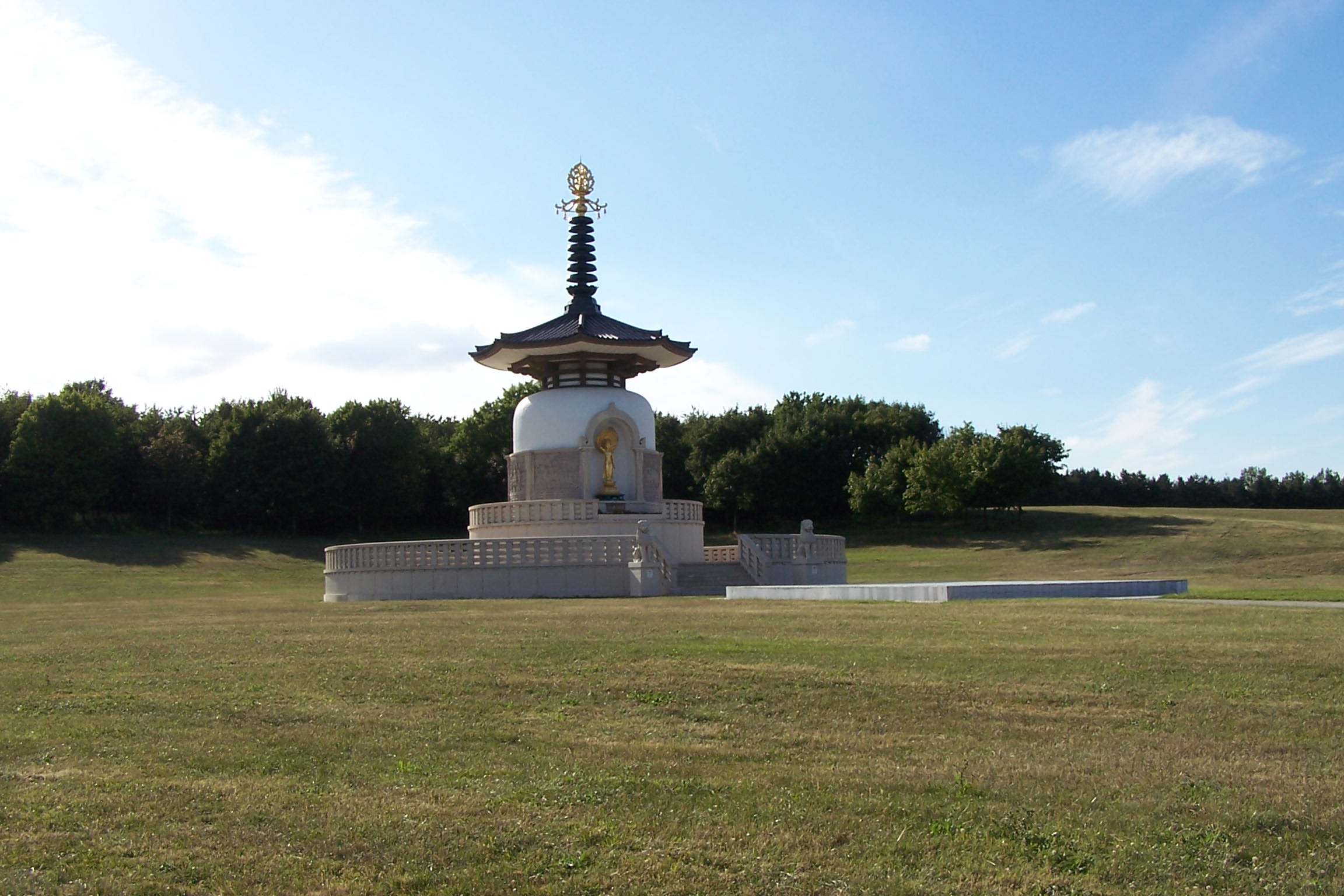
Peace Pagoda

Milton Keynes consists of many pre-existing towns and villages that anchored the urban design, as well as new infill developments. The modern-day urban area outside the original six towns (Bletchley, Fenny Stratford, Newport Pagnell, (Note: Not in original designated area but subsequent expansion has grown to include it.) Stony Stratford, Wolverton, and Woburn Sands) was largely rural farmland but included many picturesque North Buckinghamshire villages and hamlets: Bradwell village and its Abbey, Broughton, Caldecotte, Great Linford, Loughton, Milton Keynes Village, New Bradwell, Shenley Brook End, Shenley Church End, Simpson, Stantonbury, Tattenhoe, Tongwell, Walton, Water Eaton, Wavendon, Willen, Great and Little Woolstone, Woughton on the Green. These historical settlements were made the focal points of their respective grid square. Every other district has an historical antecedent, if only in original farms or even field names.

Bletchley was first recorded in the 12th century as Blechelai. Its station was an important junction (the London and North Western Railway with the Oxford-Cambridge Varsity Line), leading to the substantial urban growth in the town in the Victorian period. It expanded to absorb the village of Water Eaton and town of Fenny Stratford.

Bradwell is a traditional rural village with earthworks of a Norman motte and bailey and parish church. Bradwell Abbey, a former Benedictine Priory and scheduled monument, was of major economic importance in this area of North Buckinghamshire before its dissolution in 1524. Nowadays there is only a small medieval chapel and a manor house occupying the site. New Bradwell, to the north of Bradwell and east of Wolverton, was built specifically for railway workers. The level bed of the old Wolverton to Newport Pagnell Line near here has been converted to a redway, making it a favoured route for cycling. A working windmill is sited on a hill outside the village.

Great Linford appears in the Domesday Book as Linforde, and features a church dedicated to Saint Andrew, dating from 1215. Today, the outer buildings of the 17th century manor house form an arts centre.

Milton Keynes (Village) is the original village to which the New Town owes its name. The original village is still evident, with a thatched pub, village hall, church and traditional housing. The area around the village has reverted to its 11th-century name of Middleton. The oldest surviving domestic building in the area (c. 1300 CE), "perhaps the manor house", is here.

Stony Stratford began as a settlement on Watling Street during the Roman occupation, beside the ford over the Great Ouse. There has been a market here since 1194 (by charter of King Richard I). The former Rose and Crown Inn on the High Street is reputedly the last place the Princes in the Tower were seen alive.

The manor house of Walton village, Walton Hall, is the headquarters of the Open University and the tiny parish church (deconsecrated) is in its grounds. The small parish church (1680) at Willen was designed by the architect and physicist Robert Hooke. Nearby, by Willen Lake, there is a Buddhist Temple and the Peace Pagoda, which was built in 1980 and was the first built by the Nipponzan-Myōhōji Buddhist Order in the western world.

The original Wolverton was a medieval settlement just north and west of today's town. The ridge and furrow pattern of agriculture can still be seen in the nearby fields. The 12th century (rebuilt in 1819) Church of the Holy Trinity still stands next to the Norman motte and bailey site. Modern Wolverton was a 19th-century New Town built to house the workers at the Wolverton railway works, which built engines and carriages for the London and North Western Railway.

Among the smaller villages and hamlets are three – Broughton, Loughton and Woughton on the Green – that are of note in that their names each use a different pronunciation (Note: /ˈbrɔːtən/, as in brought; /ˈlaʊtən/, as in bough; and /ˈwʊftən/, as in enough, respectively) of the ough letter sequence in English.

== Education ==
=== Schools ===
In early planning, education provision was carefully integrated into the development plans with the intention that school journeys would, as far as possible, be made by walking and cycling. Each residential grid square was provided with a primary school (ages 5 to 8) for c. 240 children, and for each two squares there was a middle school (ages 8 to 12) for c.480 children. For each eight squares there was a large secondary education campus, to contain between two and four schools for a total of 3,000–4,500 children. A central resource area served all the schools on a campus. In addition, each campus included a leisure centre with indoor and outdoor sports facilities and a swimming pool, plus a theatre. These facilities were available to the public outside school hours, thus maximising use of the investment. Changes in central government policy from the 1980s onwards subsequently led to much of this system being abandoned. Some schools have since been merged and sites sold for development, many converted to academies, and the leisure centres outsourced to commercial providers.

As in most parts of the UK, the state secondary schools in Milton Keynes are comprehensives, although schools in the rest of Buckinghamshire still use the tripartite system. Private schools are also available.

=== Universities and colleges ===
The Open University's headquarters are in the Walton Hall district; though because this is a distance learning institution, the only students resident on campus are approximately 200 full-time postgraduates. Cranfield University, an all-postgraduate institution, is in nearby Cranfield, Bedfordshire. Milton Keynes College provides further education up to foundation degree level. A campus of the University of Bedfordshire provides some tertiary education facilities locally.

As of 2023, Milton Keynes is the UK's largest population centre without its own conventional university, a shortfall that the Council aims to rectify. In January 2019, the council and its partner, Cranfield University, invited proposals to design a campus near the Central station for a new university, code-named MK:U. However this project seems unlikely to proceed, following a government decision in January 2023 to deny funding. In June 2023, the Open University announced that it would "initiate work on the strategic and financial case to relocate [from] the OU's existing campus at Walton Hall to a new site adjacent to the central railway station" and possibly commence teaching full-time undergraduates.

Through Milton Keynes University Hospital, the city also has links with the University of Buckingham's medical school.

=== City development archive and library ===
Milton Keynes City Discovery Centre at Bradwell Abbey holds an extensive archive about the planning and development of Milton Keynes and has an associated research library. The centre also offers an education programme (with a focus on urban geography and local history) to schools, universities and professionals.

== Governance ==
=== Local government ===
The responsible local government is Milton Keynes City Council, which administers the City of Milton Keynes, a unitary authority, and non-metropolitan county in law, since May 1996. Until then, it was controlled by Buckinghamshire County Council. Historically, most of the area that became Milton Keynes was known as the "Three Hundreds of Newport".

The unitary authority area, which extends beyond the ONS-defined Milton Keynes built-up area and encompasses the town of Olney and many rural villages and hamlets, is fully parished.

=== International co-operation ===
Although Milton Keynes has no formalised twinning agreements, it has partnered and co-operated with various cities over the years. The most contact has been with Almere, Netherlands, especially on energy management and urban planning. For several years from 1995, the city co-operated with Tychy, Poland, after participating in the European City Cooperation System in Tychy in March 1994.

Due to the twinning of the borough and the equivalent administrative region of Bernkastel-Wittlich, the council worked with Bernkastel-Kues, Germany, for example on art projects.

In 2017, they partnered with the Chinese fellow smart city of Yinchuan.

== Public services ==
Milton Keynes University Hospital, in the Eaglestone district, is an NHS general hospital with an Accident and Emergency unit. It is associated for medical teaching purposes with the University of Buckingham medical school. There are two small private hospitals: BMI Healthcare's Saxon Clinic and Ramsay Health Care's Blakelands Hospital.

There is a Category A male prison, HMP Woodhill, on the western boundary. A section of the prison is a Young Offenders Institution.

== Transport ==
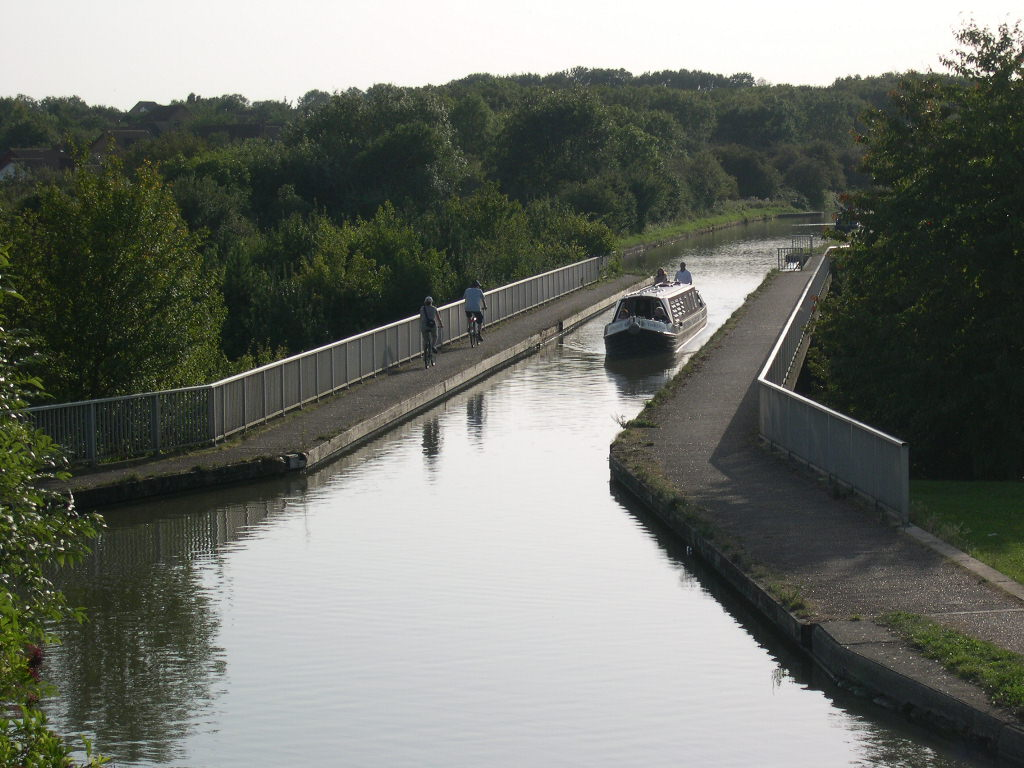
The Grand Union Canal passes over Grafton Street at New Bradwell, via its modern aqueduct

The Grand Union Canal, the West Coast Main Line, the A5 road and the M1 motorway provide the major axes that influenced the urban designers.

=== Railway ===
The urban area is served by seven railway stations:

- Wolverton, Milton Keynes Central and Bletchley stations are on the West Coast Main Line and are served by local commuter services between London Euston and Birmingham New Street or Crewe. Milton Keynes Central is also served by inter-city services between London Euston and Glasgow Central, Edinburgh Waverley, Holyhead, Liverpool Lime Street or Manchester Piccadilly. Express services to London take 35 minutes.
- Bletchley, Fenny Stratford, Bow Brickhill, Woburn Sands and Aspley Guise stations are on the Marston Vale line to Bedford.

=== Roads ===
The M1 motorway runs along the east flank of MK and serves it from junctions 13 and 14 within the environs of the city, and junctions 11a and 15 slightly further away via other connecting roads. The A5 road, designated as a trunk road, runs right through the west of the city centre, as a grade separated dual carriageway. Other main roads are the A509 to Wellingborough and Kettering, and the A421 and A422, both running west towards Buckingham (and Oxford) and east towards Bedford (and Cambridge). Additionally, the A4146 runs from (near) junction 14 of the M1 to Leighton Buzzard. Proximity to the M1 has led to construction of a number of distribution centres, including Magna Park at the south-eastern flank of Milton Keynes, near Wavendon and M1 J13.

=== Buses and coaches ===
Many long-distance coaches stop at the Milton Keynes Coachway, (beside M1 Junction 14), about 3.3 miles (5.3 km) from the centre and 4.3 mi (7 km) from Milton Keynes Central railway station. There is also a park and ride car park on the site.

The city is also served by a number of local and regional bus services, run by national operators such as Stagecoach and Arriva, with most regional services stopping at major centres in the city, such as CMK (including Central station), Bletchley, Wolverton and Magna Park. The city council also operates an on-demand bus service known as MK Connect, which serves the whole unitary authority area.

=== Other ===
Milton Keynes is served by (and, via its Redway network, provides part of) routes 6 and 51 on the National Cycle Network.

The nearest international airport is London Luton and is easily reached by coach. Cranfield Airport, an airfield, is 8 miles (13 km) away.

== Demographics ==
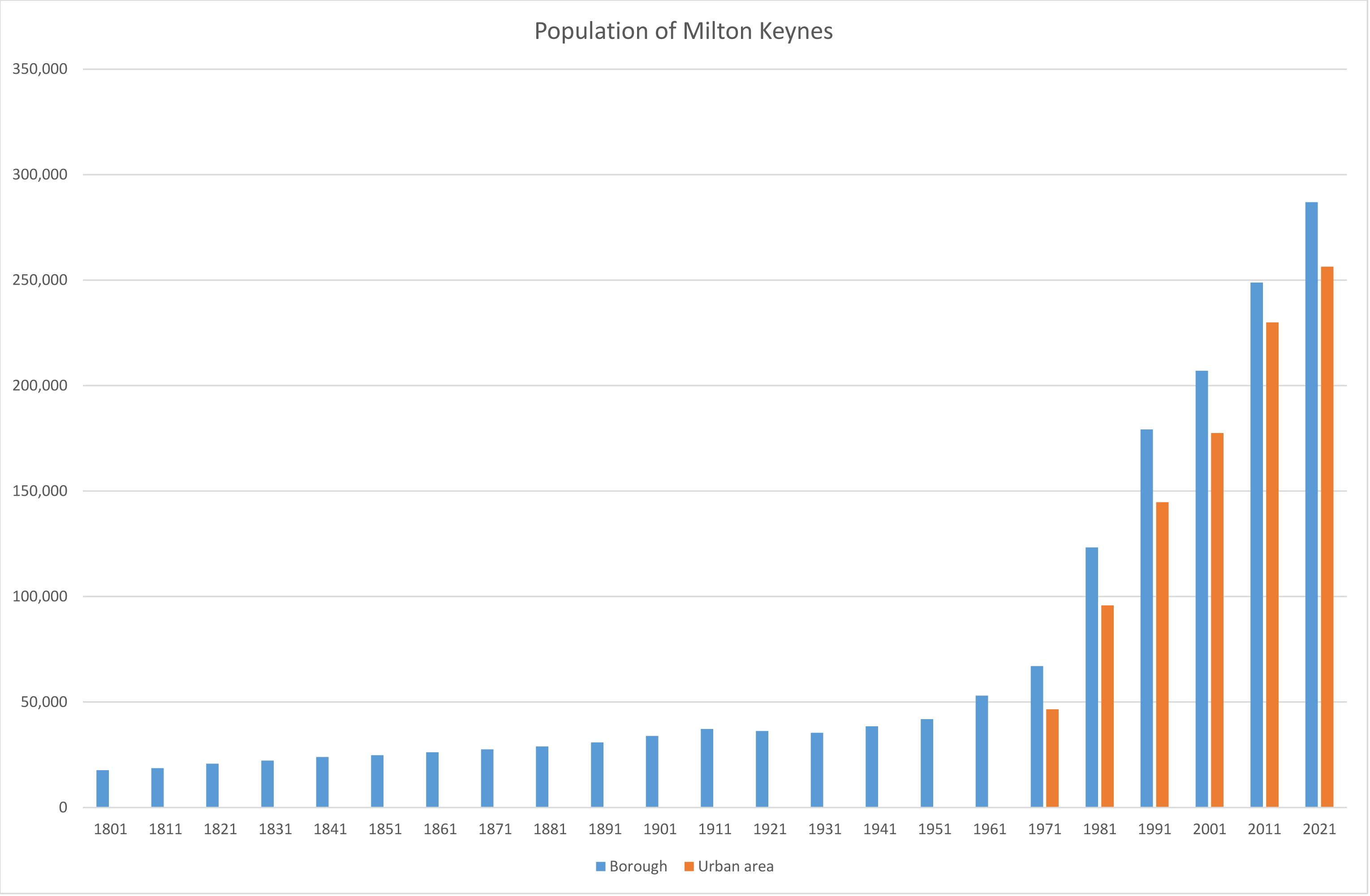
Population trend of borough and urban area 1801–2021

At the 2021 census, the population of the Milton Keynes urban area, including the contiguous Newport Pagnell and Woburn Sands, was 264,349.

According to the 2011 census, the average age of the population is lower than is typical for the UK's 63 primary urban areas: 25.3% of the borough population were aged under 18 (5th place) and 13.4% were aged 65+ (57th out of 63). The mean age is 35.7 and the median age is 35. 18.5% of residents were born outside the UK (11th). At the 2011 census, the ethnic profile was 78.9% white, 3.4% mixed, 9.7% Asian/Asian British, 7.3% Black/African/Caribbean/Black British, and 0.7% other. The religious profile was that 62.0% of people were reported having a religion and 31.4% having none; the remainder declined to say: 52% are Christian, 5.1% Muslim, 3.0% Hindu; other religions each had less than 1% of the population.

== Economy, finances and business ==
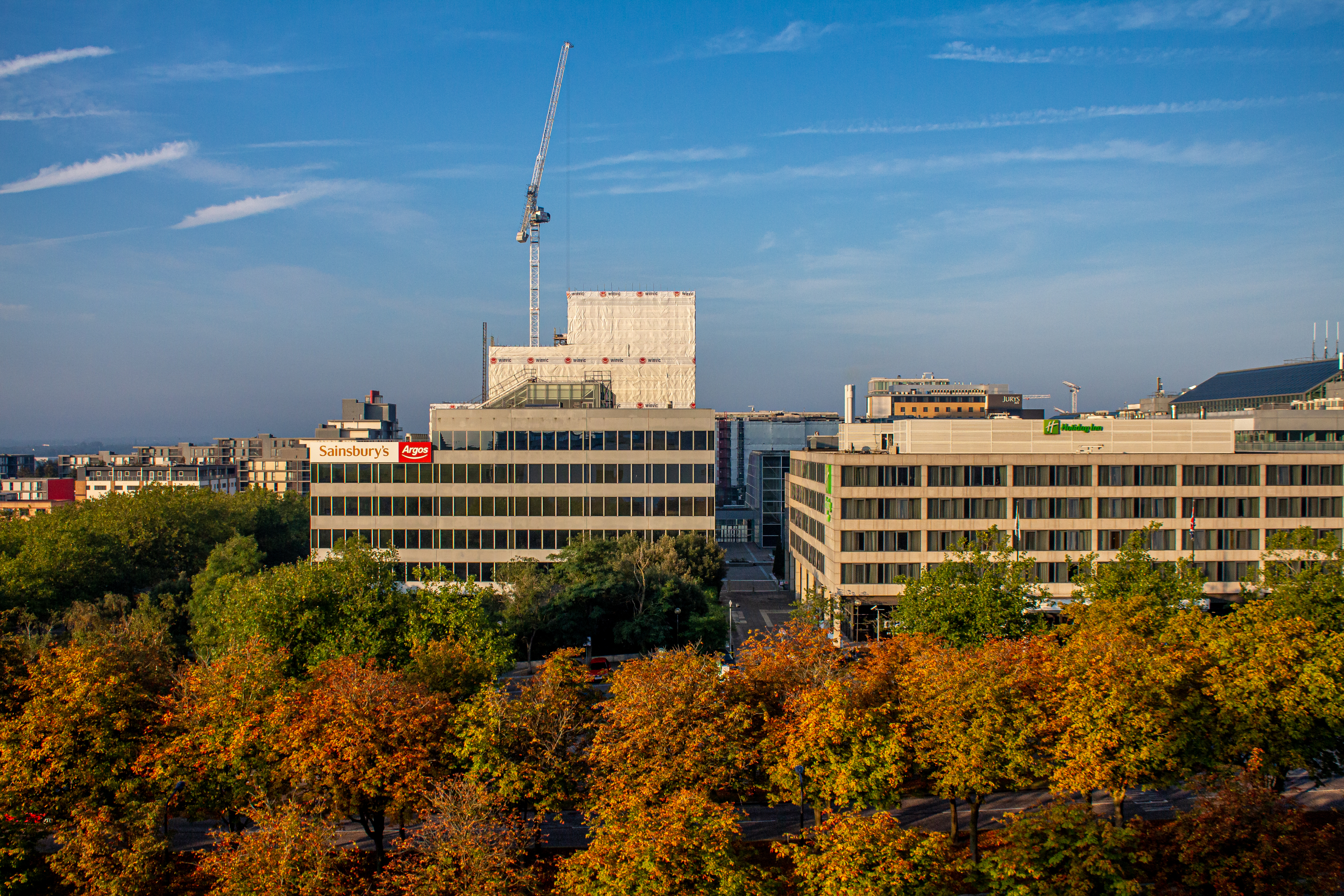
Sainsburys-Argos [then] company headquarters (left) and a Holiday-Inn hotel (one of 24 hotels within MK) in the city centre in 2021.

In 2014 and 2017, Milton Keynes ranked third in terms of contribution to the national economy, as measured by gross value added per worker, of the 63 largest conurbations in the UK. In 2020, its ranking slipped to seventh.

=== Major businesses ===
Milton Keynes has consistently benefited from above-average economic growth, ranked as one of the UK's top five cities. In 2020 it was ranked sixth of 63 for business startups (per 10,000 people).

Milton Keynes is home to several national and international companies, notably Domino's Pizza, Marshall Amplification, Mercedes-Benz, Suzuki, Volkswagen Group, Red Bull Racing, Network Rail, and Yamaha Music Europe.

Santander UK and the Open University are major employers locally.

=== Small and medium enterprise ===
In 2013, (Note: An updated report for 2016 is available but does not give this data.) 99.4% of enterprises being SMEs, just 0.6% of businesses locally employ more than 250 people (but more than one third of employees), whereas 81.5% employ fewer than 10 people. The "professional, scientific and technical sector" contributes the largest number of business units, 16.7%. The retail sector is the largest contributor of employment. Milton Keynes has one of the highest number of business start-ups in England, but also of failures. Although education, health and public administration are important contributors to employment, the contribution is significantly less than the averages for England or the South East.

=== Employment ===
Of the population, 75% is economically active, including 8.3% (of the population) who are self-employed; 90% work in service industries of various sorts (of which wholesale and retail is the largest sector) and 9% in manufacturing.

=== Social inequality ===
In 2015, the City of Milton Keynes had nine "lower super output areas" (Note: A "lower super output area" is a small geographic area defined by the Office of National Statistics to contain 1,000 to 1,500 residents and thus to permit consistent national comparisons.) that are in the 10% most deprived in England, but also had twelve "lower super output areas" in the 10% least deprived in England. This contrast between areas of affluence and areas of deprivation in spite of a thriving local economy, inspired local charity The Community Foundation (in its 2016 "Vital Signs" report) to describe the position as a "Tale of Two Cities".

In 2018, the number of homeless young people sleeping rough in tents around CMK attracted national headlines as it became the apex of a national problem of poverty, inadequate mental health care and unaffordable housing. On a visit to refurbishment and extension work on the YMCA building, Housing Minister Heather Wheeler declared that "Nobody in this day and age should be sleeping on the street".

== Culture, media and sport ==
=== Music ===
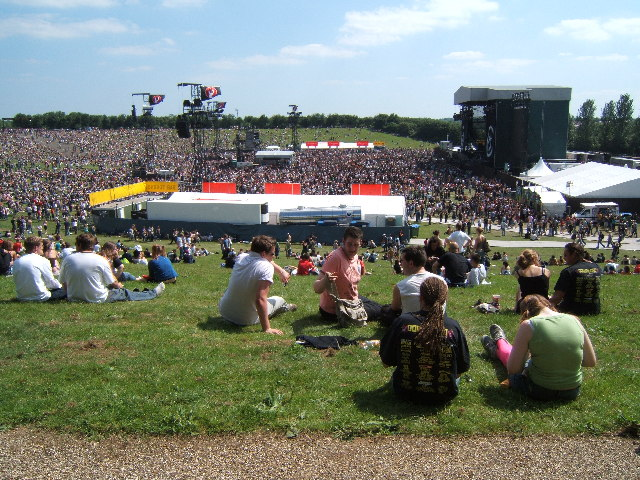
65,000 capacity by the Green Day Bullet in a Bible concert at the National Bowl

The open-air National Bowl is a 65,000-capacity venue for large-scale events.

In Wavendon, the Stables – founded by the jazz musicians Cleo Laine and John Dankworth – provides a venue for jazz, blues, folk, rock, classical, pop and world music. It presents around 400 concerts and over 200 educational events each year and also hosts the National Youth Music Camps summer camp for young musicians. In 2010, the Stables founded the biennial IF Milton Keynes International Festival, producing events in unconventional spaces and places across Milton Keynes.

Milton Keynes City Orchestra is a professional freelance orchestra based at Woughton Campus.

=== Arts, cinema, theatre and museums ===
The municipal public art gallery, MK Gallery, presents exhibitions of international contemporary art. The gallery was extended and remodelled in 2018/19 and includes an art-house cinema. Elsewhere in the city, there are two multiplex cinemas; one in CMK and one in Denbigh.

In 1999, the adjacent 1,400-seat Milton Keynes Theatre opened. The theatre has an unusual feature: the ceiling can be lowered closing off the third tier (gallery) to create a more intimate space for smaller-scale productions. There is a further professional performance space in Stantonbury.

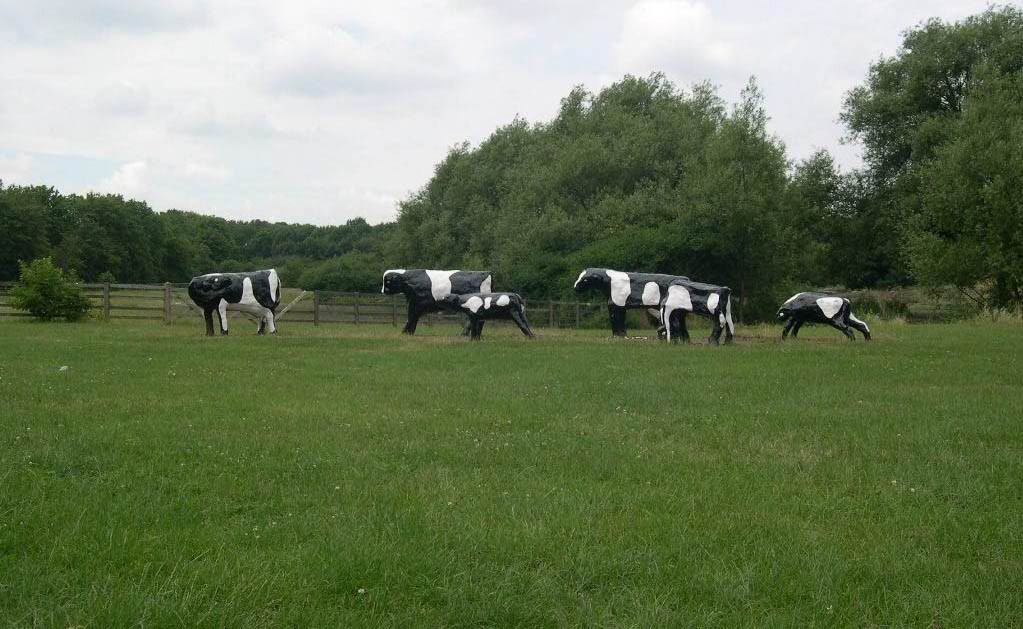
Liz Leyh's iconic Concrete Cows

There are three museums: the Bletchley Park complex, which houses the museum of wartime cryptography; the National Museum of Computing (adjacent to Bletchley Park, with a separate entrance), which includes a working replica of the Colossus computer; and the Milton Keynes Museum, which includes the Stacey Hill Collection of rural life that existed before the foundation of MK, the British Telecom collection, and the original Concrete Cows. Other numerous public sculptures in Milton Keynes include work by Elisabeth Frink, Philip Jackson, Nicolas Moreton and Ronald Rae.

Milton Keynes Arts Centre offers a year-round exhibition programme, family workshops and courses. The centre is based in some of Linford Manor's historical exterior buildings, barns, almshouses and pavilions. The Westbury Arts Centre in Shenley Wood is based in a 16th-century grade II listed farmhouse building. Westbury Arts has been providing spaces and studios for professional artists since 1994.

=== Communications and media ===
For television, the city is allocated to BBC East and ITV Anglia. (Note: some areas may receive BBC South and ITV Meridian, but it is outside their allocated area.) For radio, Milton Keynes is served by two community radio stations (MKFM and Horizon Radio), and was previously served by Heart East (a regional commercial station based locally). BBC Three Counties Radio is the local BBC Radio station. CRMK (Cable Radio Milton Keynes) is a voluntary station broadcasting on the Internet.

As of September 2021, Milton Keynes has one local newspaper, the Milton Keynes Citizen, (Note: A competing paper, MK News, closed in October 2016.) which has a significant online presence.

=== Sport ===
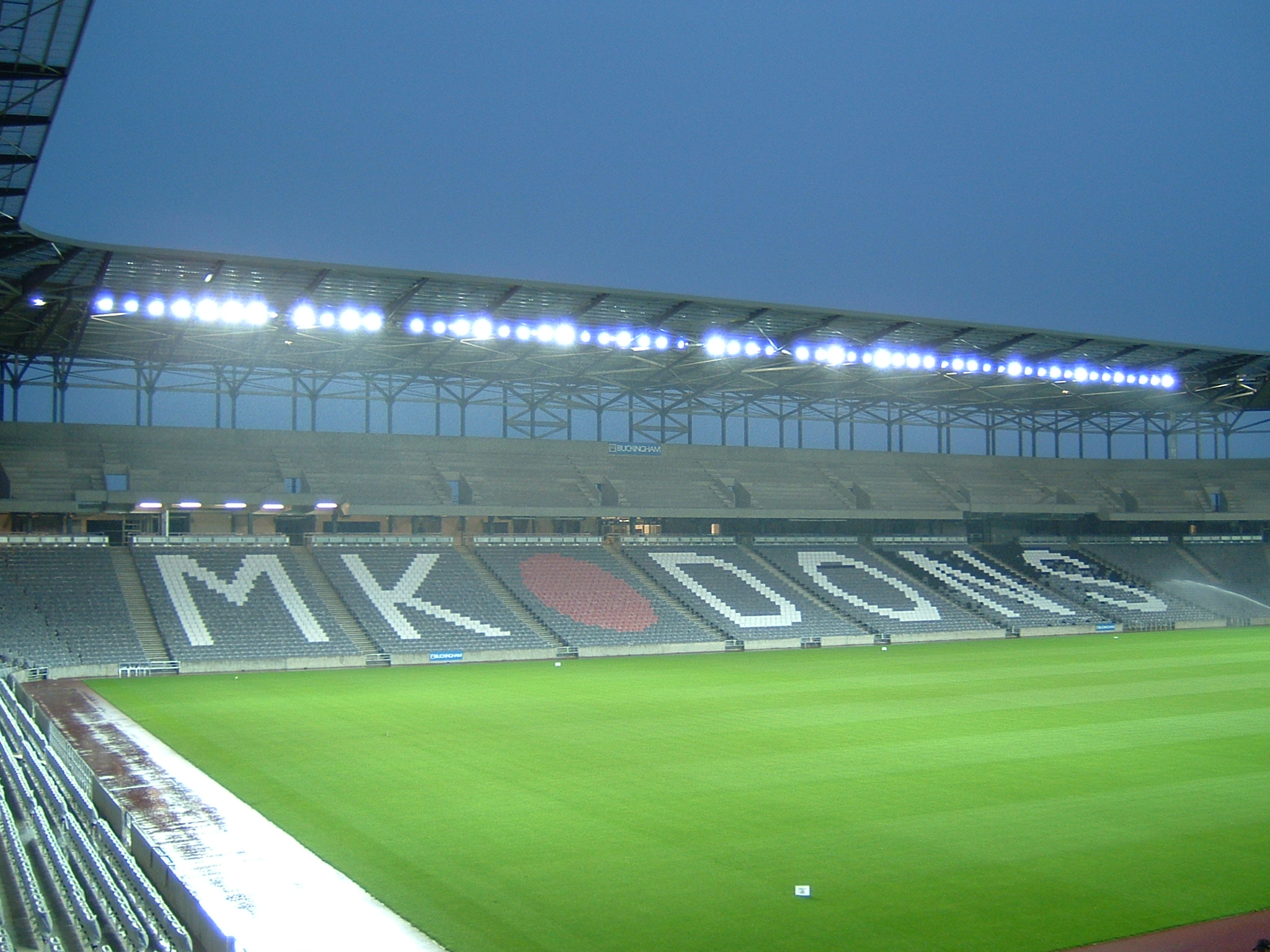
Stadium MK (in 2007)

Milton Keynes has professional teams in football (Milton Keynes Dons F.C. at Stadium MK), in ice hockey (Milton Keynes Lightning at Planet Ice Milton Keynes), and in Formula One (Red Bull Racing).

The Xscape indoor ski slope and the iFLY indoor sky diving facility are important attractions in CMK; the National Badminton Centre in Loughton is home to the national badminton squad and headquarters of Badminton England.

Many other sports are represented at amateur level.

Near the central station, in a space beside the former Milton Keynes central bus station, there is a purpose-built street skateboarding plaza named the Buszy.

Willen Lake hosts watersports on the south basin.

=== New technologies ===
In recent years, the City Council has promoted MK as a test-bed for experimental urban technologies. The most well-known of these is the Starship Technologies' (largely) autonomous delivery robots: Milton Keynes provided its world-first urban deployment of these units in 2018. By October 2020, said Starship, Milton Keynes had the "world's largest autonomous robot fleet". Other projects include the LUTZ Pathfinder pod, an autonomous (self-driving) vehicle built by the Transport Systems Catapult.

== Notable people ==
=== Sport ===
- Charles Ademeno, former professional footballer
- Dele Alli, professional footballer
- Andrew Baggaley, English table tennis champion
- Brothers George and Sam Baldock, professional footballers.
- Ben Chilwell, professional footballer
- Chris Clarke, English sprinter
- Lee Hasdell, professional Mixed martial artist and Kickboxer
- James Hildreth, professional cricketer
- Liam Kelly, professional footballer
- Kwame Nkrumah-Acheampong the only Ghanaian winter Olympian.
- Craig Pickering, English sprinter
- Ian Poulter, PGA & European Tour golf professional. Member of the 2010 and 2012 European Ryder Cup Teams
- Mark Randall, professional footballer
- Antonee Robinson, professional footballer
- Greg Rutherford, long jump gold medallist for Team GB at the 2012 Olympic Games
- Ed Slater, professional rugby union player
- Fallon Sherrock, professional darts player.
- Sam Tomkins, professional rugby league player
- Dan Wheldon (1978–2011), Indy car driver
- Leah Williamson, professional footballer (England captain).

=== Business ===
- Jim Marshall (1923–2012), founder and CEO of Marshall Amplification was living in and ran his business from Milton Keynes when he died
- Pete Winkelman, Former Chairman of Milton Keynes Dons Football Club, owner of Linford Manor recording studios, long-term resident

=== Academic ===
- Christopher B-Lynch, (visiting) Professor of Obstetrics and Gynaecology at Cranfield University, responsible for inventing the eponymously named B-Lynch suture
- Alan P. F. Sell (1935–2016), academic and theologian lived in Milton Keynes in his later years and died there
- Alan Turing (1912–1954), played a significant role in the creation of the modern computer. He lodged at the Crown Inn, Shenley Brook End, while working at Bletchley Park

=== Stage, screen and media ===
- Errol Barnett, an anchor and correspondent for CNN
- Emily Bergl, an actress known for her roles in Desperate Housewives and Shameless
- Emika, born Ema Jolly, a musical artist
- Richard Macer, documentary maker
- Clare Nasir, the meteorologist, TV and radio personality, was born in Milton Keynes in 1970
- Kevin Whately, professional actor

=== Literature ===
- Sarah Pinborough, English horror writer
- Jack Trevor Story, novelist, was a long-term resident of Milton Keynes

=== Politics ===
- Frank Markham (Sir Sydney Frank Markham, MP) (1897–1975), born in Stony Stratford and was local MP (1951–1964).
- Nat Wei, Baron Wei, member of the House of Lords (born in Watford, grew up in Milton Keynes)

=== Music ===
==== Individual ====
- Bob Leith, drummer for the Kingston upon Thames band Cardiacs and others went to school in Milton Keynes and formed his first bands there including Part 1
- Adam Ficek, drummer of London band Babyshambles
- Gordon Moakes, the bassist for the London-based rock band Bloc Party

==== Bands ====
- Capdown, a ska punk band, came from and formed in Milton Keynes in 1997
- Fellsilent, a metal band, come from and formed in Milton Keynes in 2003
- Tesseract, a djent band, formed as a full live act in Milton Keynes in 2007. Tesseract's guitarist, songwriter and producer Acle Kahney is also a former member of Fellsilent.
- Hacktivist, a grime and djent band
- RavenEye, the rock band, formed in Milton Keynes in 2014
