= Balancing lake =

Element of flood management system

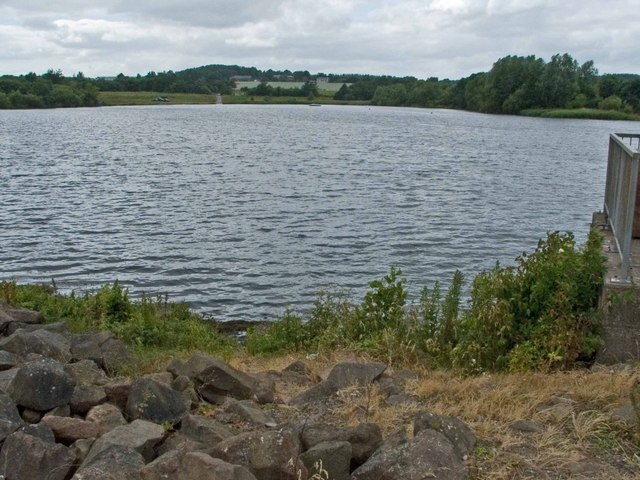
Priorslee Lake in Shropshire, England. Originally known locally as the Balancing Lake, it was created to manage water run-off from the roofs and streets of Priorslee.

A balancing lake (also flood basin) is a term used in the UK to describe a retention basin used to control flooding by temporarily storing flood waters. The term balancing pond is also used, though typically for smaller storage facilities for streams and brooks.

In open countryside, heavy rainfall soaks into the ground and is released relatively slowly into watercourses (ditches, streams, rivers). In an urban area, the extent of hard surfaces (roofs, roads) means that the rainfall is dumped immediately into the drainage system. If left unchecked, this has the potential to cause flooding downstream. The function of a balancing lake as part of a sustainable urban drainage scheme is to contain this surge and release it slowly. Failure to do this, especially in older settlements without separate storm sewers and foul sewers, can cause serious pollution as well as flooding.

== Engineering ==
At its simplest, a balancing lake can be constructed by creating a dam across a drain or stream at a convenient valley, with a restricted diameter outlet pipe through the dam. Normal flows pass through the pipe without restriction, while heavy flows create a backup, causing water levels behind the dam to rise. Over the following few days, the level subsides. This is often enough for a small housing development.

More advanced systems are computer-controlled such that the entire flow of a river can be diverted into a holding lake, perhaps to reduce the impact of a large scale rainstorm in the catchment on communities downriver.

For aesthetic and safety reasons, the system can be designed so that there is a permanent lake. A lake with an equivalent area of 1,000 by 1,000 metres will hold a million cubic metres of water for each metre of depth. Typically such a lake would have an outer earth bank of 1 metre, then a leisure path, then a 10 cm inner bank to the steady-state level.

== Other benefits ==
A permanent lake can provide useful recreation facilities such as sailing, windsurfing, or of wildlife. Water sports and wildlife habitats do not mix well, though a scheme can have both in linked basins where the recreational basin fills first and the wildlife basin is only used in exceptional conditions.

- A recreational use facility can have relatively steep banks (perhaps with a footpath inside the bank next to the permanent lake for aesthetics and safety). The water level can rise substantially without a significant increase in overall area.
- A basin that is intended for use by wildlife and for visual amenity needs to be relatively shallow for maximum plant life. It must be designed with the assumption that it will be invoked very rarely, especially during the nesting season.

=== Case study: Willen Lake, Milton Keynes ===
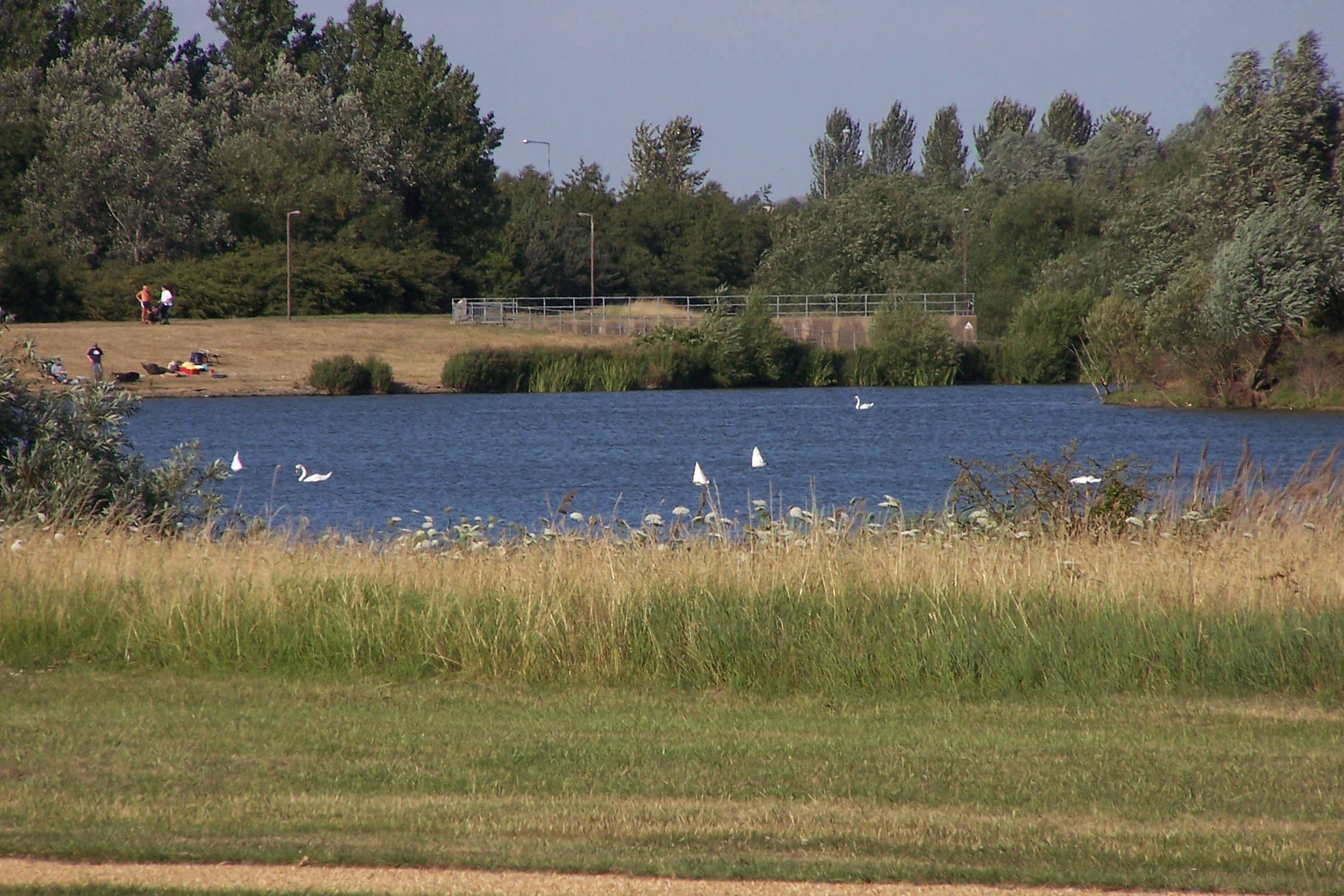
Willen Lake (north basin), with spill-way in the background

Willen Lake is one of the largest (400,000 m^{2}) purpose-built urban stormwater balancing lakes in the UK. The lake is designed to take surface run-off from Milton Keynes, the largest of a number designed to do so. The lake has capacity for an additional level increase of 1.3 metres, equivalent to a once in 200 years event. Unlike most of the rest of the UK, the city has separate storm and foul sewers, so sewage pollution is not a significant problem. Additionally, there are facilities to prevent accidental oil spills and the like from reaching the lake.

As well as local storm drains, the lake's primary purpose is to intercept the river Ouzel, a tributary of the river Great Ouse. The catchment area is Oxford Clay that tends to get saturated easily, so field run-off has always been a problem.

The South Basin is designed for recreational use, mainly dinghy sailing and wind surfing, with a circumference path and banks as described above. It is linked to the North (Wildlife) Basin and can be drawn on to manage the level of the latter more finely. The North Basin has a large, undisturbed, central island. The extensive shallows support a good crop of aquatic plants and invertebrates. Very quickly, it became a key wildfowl site.

In winter, it attracts up to 2,500 wild birds, with a wide variety of migrating waders in spring and autumn. Common tern, tufted duck, ringed and little ringed plover, common redshank and northern lapwing. Canada geese have become naturalised and they are permanent residents. Both basins have deep ponds to maintain the fish population during droughts. The lake and its surrounds is owned by the Milton Keynes Parks Trust and is a public open space.

== See also ==
- Retention basin – Artificial pond for stormwater runoff
- Stormwater – Water that originates during precipitation events and snow/ice melt
- Surface runoff – Flow of excess rainwater not infiltrating in the ground over its surface
- Sustainable urban drainage system – Designed to reduce the potential impact of development
- Urban runoff – Surface runoff of water caused by urbanization
