= Campbell Park =

District and central park in Milton Keynes, England

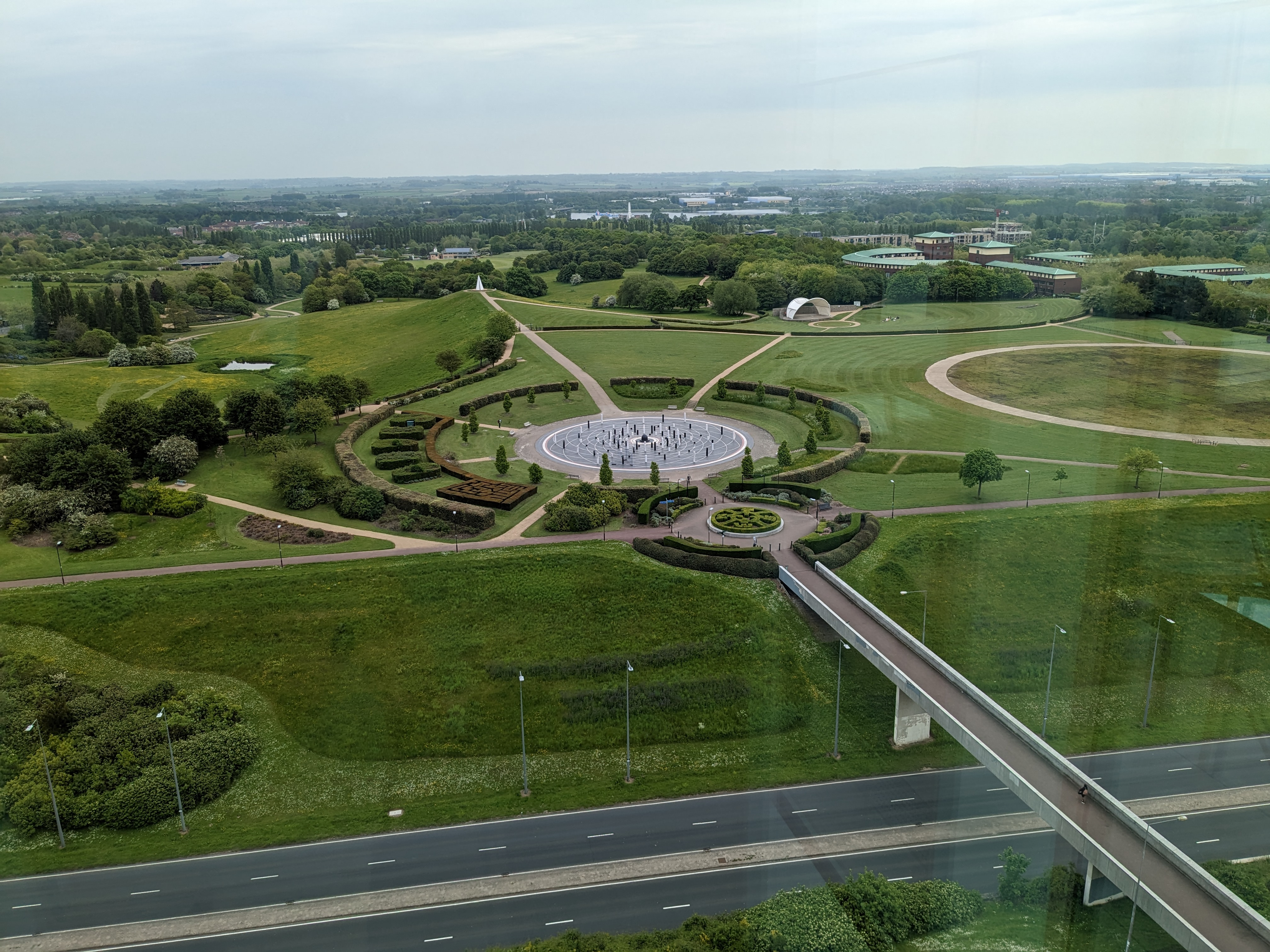
- Campbell Park, May 2023.
- Interactive map of Campbell Park
- 52.04722°N 0.74363°W
- Location: Milton Keynes, Buckinghamshire, England
- OS grid reference: SP 862 395

History
- Built: 1984 (opened)

Site notes
- Area: 46 hectares (114 acres)
- Architect(s): Derek Walker, Stuart Mosscrop and Andrew Mahaddie (1973–1975), revised Neil Higson (1980).
- Owner: Milton Keynes Parks Trust
- Website: The Parks Trust: Cambpbell Park

National Register of Historic Parks and Gardens
- Official name: Campbell Park, Milton Keynes
- Designated: 18 August 2020
- Reference no.: 1467405

Campbell Park is the name of the central park for Milton Keynes (England) and an electoral ward of the civil parish of Central Milton Keynes. (The nearby civil parish called Campbell Park previously included the park but no longer does so. It did not change its name after the park district was transferred to CMK Town Council).

The park is listed (grade 2) "due to its historic interest and innovative architectural design".

== The park ==
The park, part of Central Milton Keynes civil parish (rather than Campbell Park CP), takes up the larger part of the district. It was named in honour of the first chairman of Milton Keynes Development Corporation, Jock Campbell, Baron Campbell of Eskan. It is accessed from the main retail/service/entertainment district at the end of Midsummer Boulevard by a footbridge over the Marlborough Street (B4146, V8) cutting. From here, the park slopes downwards to the Grand Union Canal. A junction between the Grand Union and a new Bedford & Milton Keynes Waterway is proposed for this area.

The park is listed (grade 2) by Historic England, and had previously attracted praise in the Pevsner Architectural Guides:

Campbell Park, the city park, links central MK to a vast swathe of parkland down to the Ouse Valley, in all the largest and most imaginative park to have been laid out in Britain in the 20th century.

— Pevsner and others, The buildings of England: Buckinghamshire.

The magnificently generous city park [is] on the right scale for the city. It lies on axis with the shopping centre and rises to a mound, intentionally reminiscent of a prehistoric site, before spreading out with an exhilarating panorama over Newlands, Willen Lake and its surrounding parkland, with which it makes a single tract of countryside.

— Pevsner and others, The buildings of England: Buckinghamshire.

=== Milton Keynes Rose ===
The Rose, at the west end of the park and nearest to the MK's central business district, "is a public space designed for commemoration, celebration and contemplation". As well as a central Cenotaph, the installation includes markers for a wide variety of historical events.

When Queen Elizabeth II died in September 2022, the MK Rose was used by locals as a place to lay floral tributes.

=== Belvedere and the Light Pyramid ===
Leading east from the Rose, the Belvedere is level path leading to the Light Pyramid, a sculptural beacon designed by Liliane Lijn. The ground on either side falls away so that most of the path is on an increasingly elevated embankment.

=== Events plateau and amphitheatre ===
These spaces are used for community events and biennially for IF: Milton Keynes, the Milton Keynes International Festival.

This area is also known for hosting Milton Keynes-based events such as India Day and the African Diaspora Foundation Festival.

The amphitheatre has also hosted concerts featuring acts such as Steps, Paloma Faith, and Will Young.

=== Cricket ground ===
Campbell Park Cricket Ground and its pavilion lie at the east end of the park, near the Grand Union Canal.

=== Parks Trust headquarters ===
The Milton Keynes Parks Trust has its headquarters building at the eastern end of the park, near the cricket ground.
