= Church of Christ the Cornerstone =

Church in Buckinghamshire, England

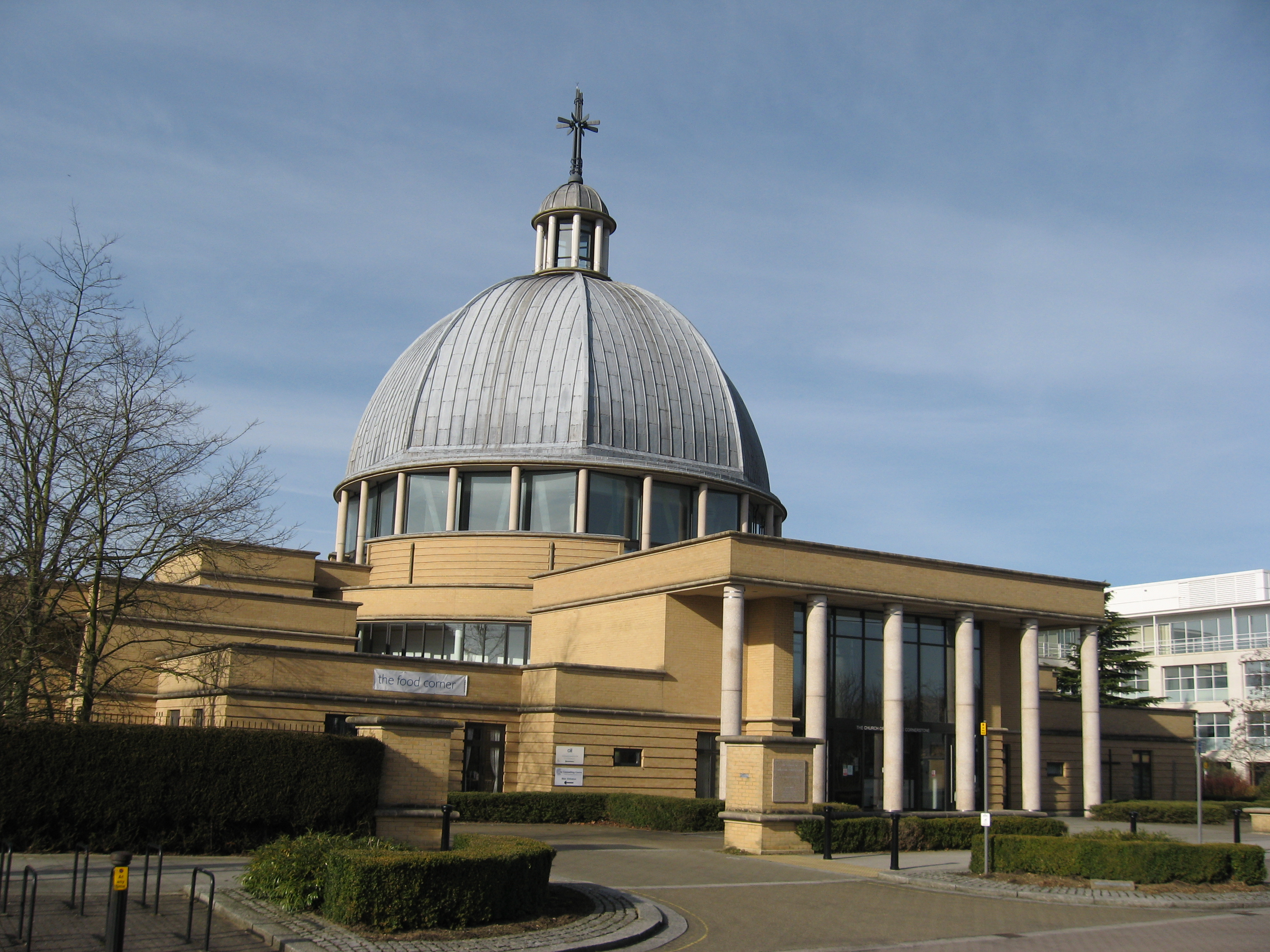
- Church of Christ the Cornerstone
- 52.041128°N 0.761099°W
- Location: Milton Keynes
- Country: England
- Denomination: Ecumenical
- Website: CornerstoneMK.co.uk

History
- Status: Active
- Dedication: by Queen Elizabeth II
- Dedicated: 13 March 1992

Architecture
- Functional status: Ecumenical Church
- Architect: Iain Smith
- Groundbreaking: 31 May 1990
- Completed: 20 December 1991

Church of Christ the Cornerstone is an ecumenical church in Milton Keynes, Buckinghamshire. It was completed in 1991 and has the Church of England, the Baptist Union, the Methodist Church, the Roman Catholic Church and the United Reformed Church working together to share the space. It is situated in Central Milton Keynes on Saxon Gate, between Midsummer and Silbury boulevards, with the Fred Roche Memorial Gardens behind it. It was the first ecumenical metro centre church in the United Kingdom.

== History ==
=== Foundation ===
In late September 1979, a local ecumenical partnership was created. It commenced with a service of dedication in Middleton Hall in Central Milton Keynes Shopping Centre. On 6 April 1980, the present congregation met at a site called Centrecom on North Row. At Easter 1981, they moved next door to Milton Keynes Central Library.

=== Construction ===
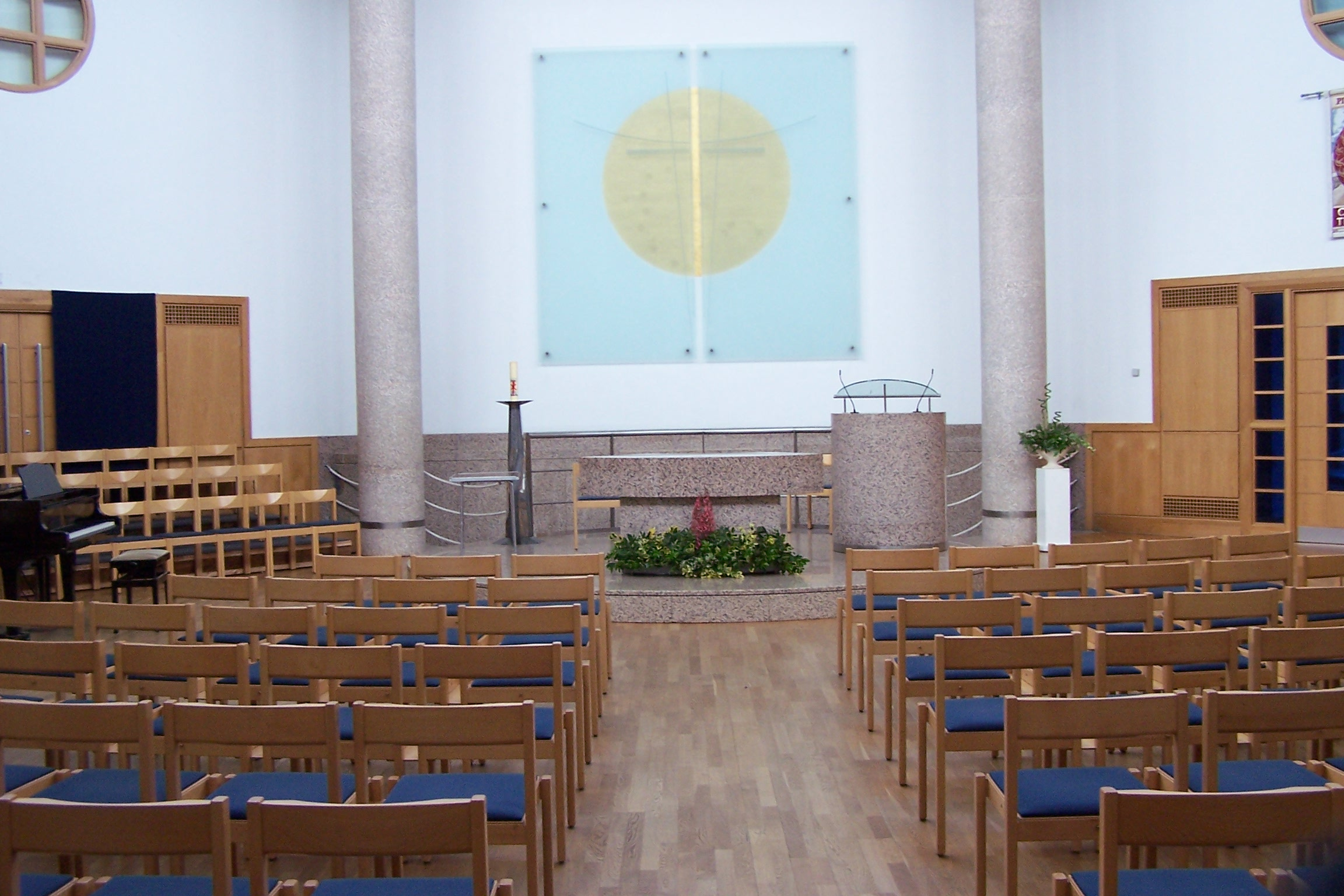
Interior

On 31 May 1990, The Baron Campbell of Eskan, the first Chairperson of Milton Keynes Development Corporation, broke ground on the site. Iain Smith, of Planning Design Development in Milton Keynes, designed the church. The Church Square, around the site was built by Beazer Developments and the church building was constructed by Marriotts of Rushden.

On 20 December 1991, construction was completed at the church was handed over, and the congregations moved into it on 12 January 1992. On 29 March 1991, the cross was placed on top of the church. It was designed by Alan Evans, an artist from Stroud in Gloucestershire.

To the top of the lantern, the church is 101 feet high and the cross adds another 18 feet to the height.

On 13 March 1992, the church was dedicated by Queen Elizabeth II in a service where the music was composed by Jonathan Dove.

== Chapel ==
The chapel is open seven days a week from 8:00 am to 8:00 pm and the café is open from 8:30 am to 4:00 pm Monday to Friday. On the weekend, in the church, there are services on Saturday at 5.30 pm for the Catholic Vigil Mass and on Sunday at 10.00 am for the morning service and 6.00 pm for the evening service. During the week there is a Daily Prayer at 9.30am Monday to Friday and Catholic Mass on Mondays at 12.30 pm.

== The "Chaplin Organ" ==
Chaplin Organ at Royal College of Organists, Kensington, 1966

The organ is by J. W. Walker & Sons Ltd, was known as the "Chaplin Organ" in its former home Royal College of Organists.It was built and finished in 1965 for the former Royal College of Organists in Kensington, as a practice/exam organ. It was transferred from there to here in 1991/2. It is regularly practised by the multiple Church Organists.

The console is attached to the main body which is powered by an electric blower. It is fitted with a drawstop action and ivory key labels. Has a radiating, concave pedalboard, along with angled jambs and light oak woodwork.

The organ is recorded by the National Pipe Organ Register Survey.

Departments and Stop List
Positive [Tr]	Great [Tr]	Pedal [El]	Couplers	Accessories
Rohrflote 8	Stopped Diapason 8	Bourdon 16 [12, ext Great SD]	Great to Pedal	
Quintadena_{..}4	Principal 4	Spitz Flute 8	Positive to Pedal	Tremulants to manuals
Fifteenth 2		Octave Flute 4	Positive to Great	

The Chaplin Organ at the Church of Christ the Cornerstone, Milton Keynes, 2008
