= Milton Keynes Parks Trust =

Managers of most of the city's open spaces

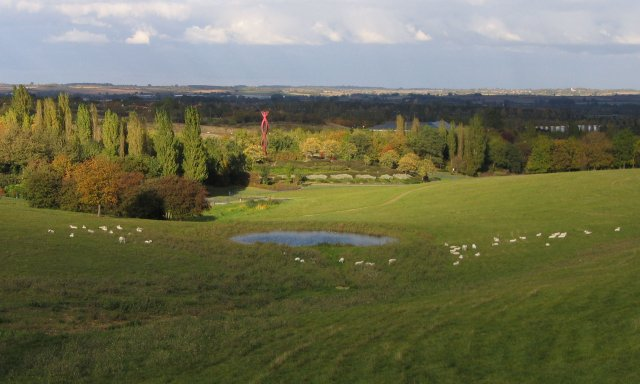
Campbell Park, Central Milton Keynes

The Parks Trust (originally, the Milton Keynes Parks Trust) is a British registered charity formed in 1992 by Milton Keynes Development Corporation to take over the public parks in Milton Keynes, Buckinghamshire.

It was given a £20 million endowment, based mainly in various commercial and retail properties in the city, and a 999-year lease on around 4,500 acres (1,800 hectares) of open space. The Trust's chief executive is Victoria Miles MBE DL.

Many of the parks feature significant public art, particularly in Campbell Park.

Milton Keynes is unusual in that most of the parks are owned and managed by a Trust rather than the local authority (Milton Keynes City Council), to ensure that the management of MK's green spaces are largely independent of the council's expenditure priorities.

Together, the Parks Trust and the City Council manage over 6,000 acres (2,400 ha) of parkland, woodland, lales and other open space across the City of Milton Keynes unitary authority area.

== Locations ==
As well as formal parks, the Trust looks after 400 acres (160 ha) of lakes, the verges of 80 miles (130 km) of roads and three ancient woodlands. In total, the Trust looks after over 6,000 acres (2,400 ha) of green space across Milton Keynes. Notable parks include Willen Lake in the east (the most popular public green space in Milton Keynes), Stanton Low Country Park in the north-west, and Howe Park Wood in the south-west, as well as various forest and nature reserves and floodplains around MK.
