= Willen Lake =

Balancing lake in Milton Keynes, UK

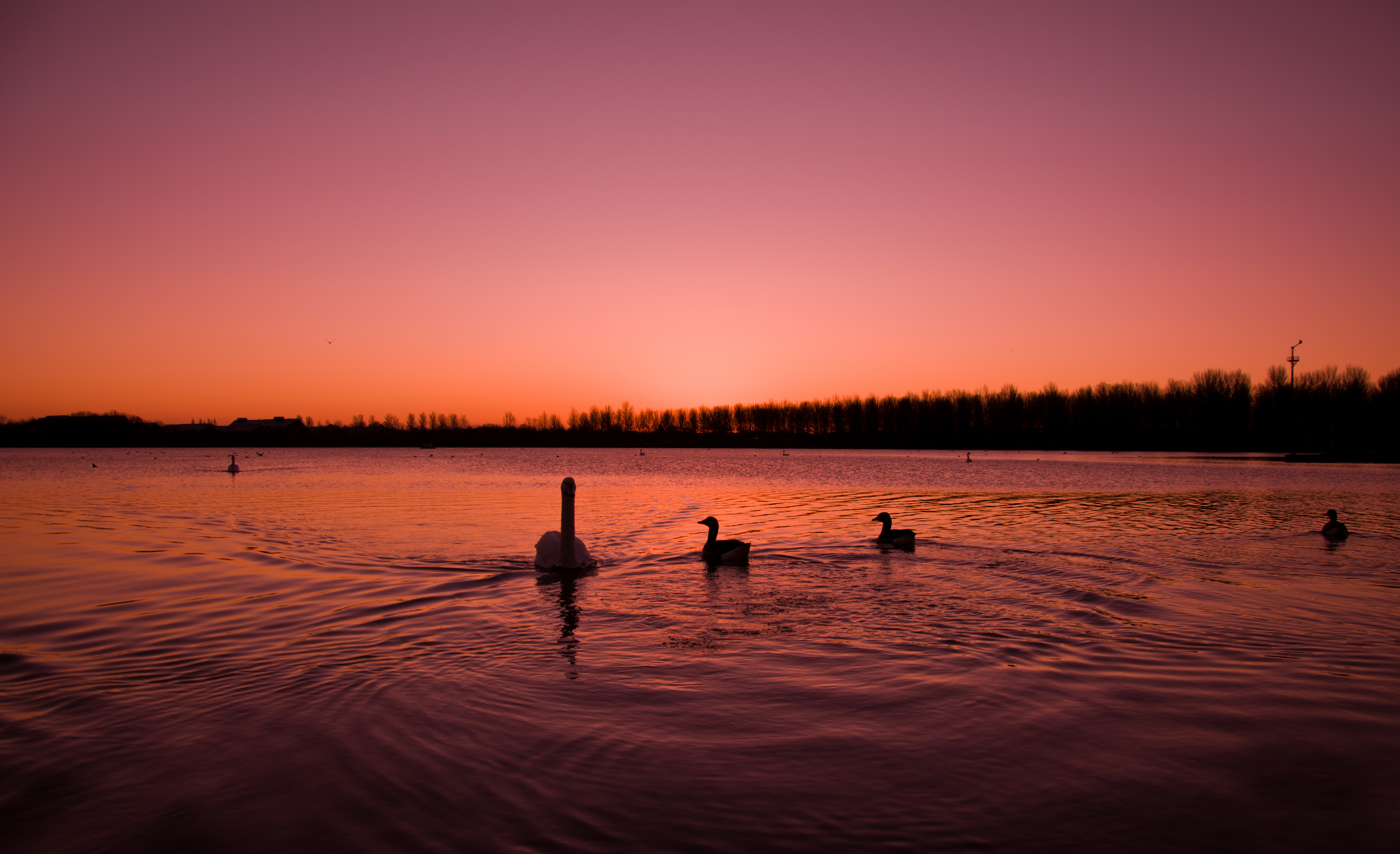
- The lake in Milton Keynes
- Location: Milton Keynes
- Coordinates: 52.05467°N 0.72106°W
- Owner: The Parks Trust
- Operated by: Whitecap Leisure
- General manager: Robert Wood
- Operating season: Year-round, some attractions seasonal.
- Area: 73 hectares (180 acres) (lake and environs)
- Website: https://www.willenlake.org.uk/

Willen Lake is a balancing lake that is also a visitor attraction and public park in Milton Keynes, Buckinghamshire The site is owned by Milton Keynes Parks Trust, an independent, self-funded charity that cares for and maintains over 2,400 hectares (6,000 acres) of green space across the city. The lake was purpose-built to mitigate flooding from the River Ouzel, a tributary of the Great Ouse. Created during the development of the city in the 1970s, it forms part of its surface-water and flood-control system. The lake system covers approximately 40 hectares (100 acres) of water across two basins and is one of the largest purpose-built balancing lake systems in Britain. Surrounding the lake itself, there are a further 32 hectares (80 acres) of landscaped parkland.

Willen Lake is Milton Keynes's most popular park; being free to enter, the number of visitors is not recorded. It comprises 180 acres (73 ha) of landscaped parkland which surround around 40 hectares (100 acres) of water across two conjoined basins. The southern basin offers a wide range of activities on and off the water, whilst the northern basin offers a more natural and tranquil setting, ideal for quiet walks and spotting wildlife.

== Attractions ==
=== Operating ===
As of 2024, the activities area of the park (to the West of the South lake) includes of a number of leisure attractions including:

- Watersports centre (new centre opened 2021)
- High ropes course
- Children's outdoor playground
- Children's outdoor splash park
- Inflatable aqua park
- Outdoor fitness equipment
- Health club (including hair and beauty salon)
- Seasonal Funfair
- Large events spaces
- Observation wheel
- Change Please Coffee Shop, a social enterprise
- Premier Inn hotel, with bar open to non-residents.

Since January 2010, Willen Lake has also been the location of the Milton Keynes parkrun, which currently starts just to the West of the lake, then follows the Grand Union canal to Great Holm, before making a complete loop of the South Lake and finishing by the Watersports Centre.

== Geography ==
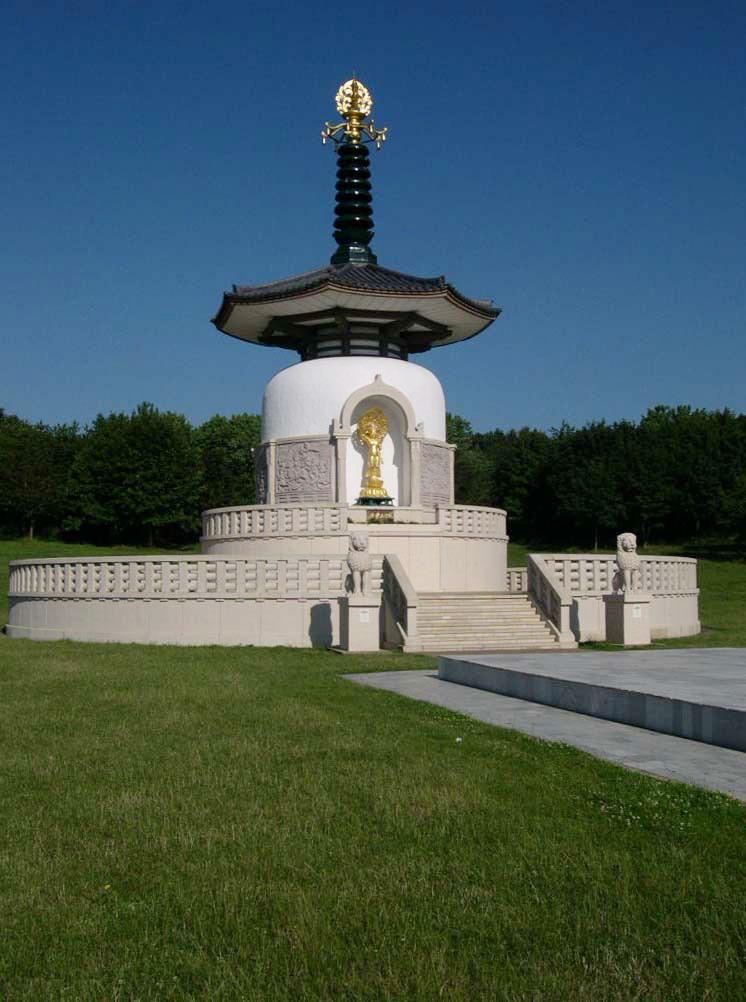
Nipponzan-Myōhōji stupa, Milton Keynes

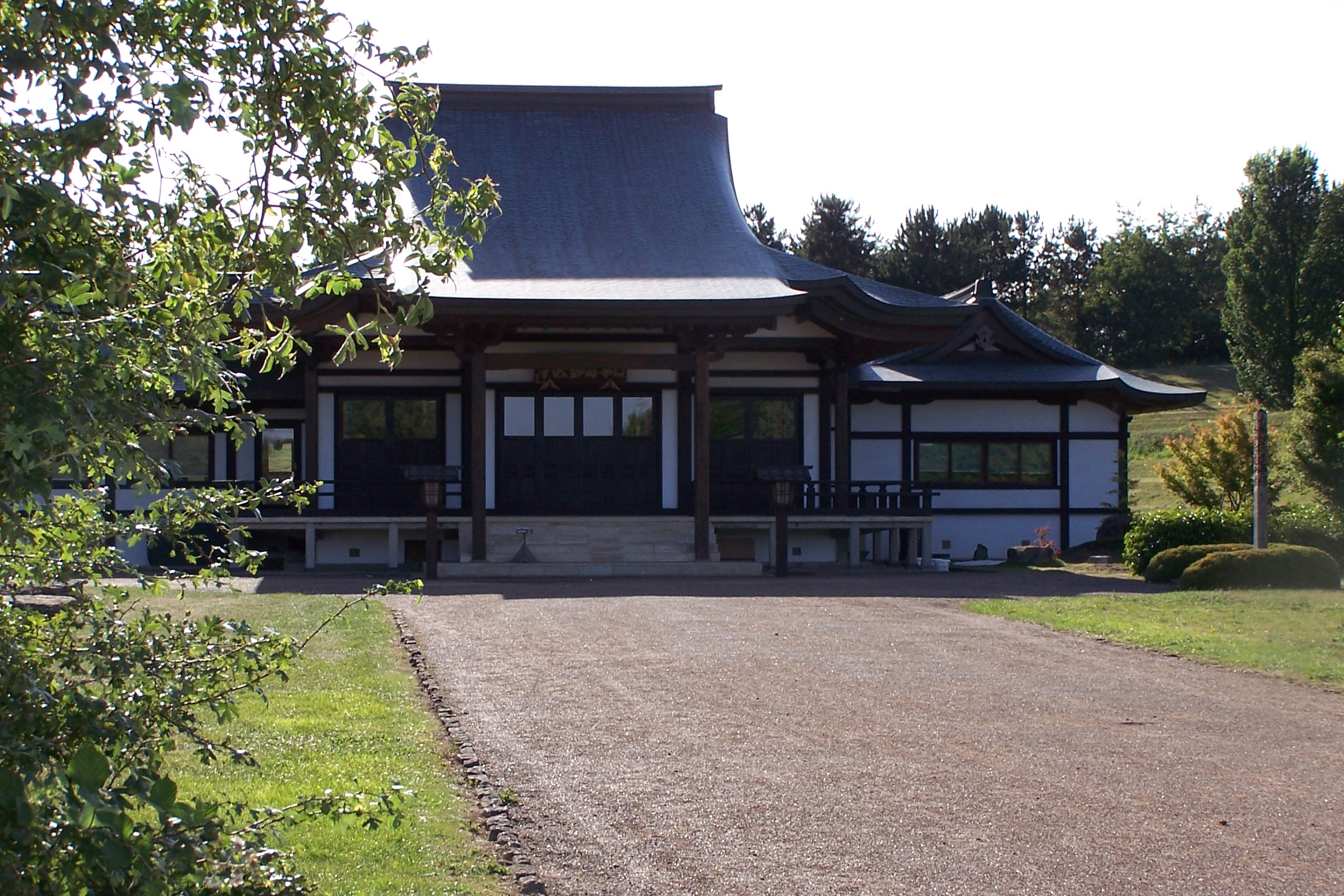
The Nipponzan-Myōhōji temple in Willen, Milton Keynes

The lake is one of the largest purpose-built stormwater balancing lakes in the UK. The lake is designed to take surface run-off from Milton Keynes, the largest of a number designed to do so. The lake has capacity for an additional level increase of 1.3 metres, equivalent to a once in 200 years event. Unlike most of the rest of the UK, Milton Keynes has separate storm and foul sewers, so sewage pollution is not a significant problem.

The lake is surrounded by a mixture of open parkland and woodland, which forms part of the wider Ouzel Valley Park. The lake is divided by an embankment and bridge carrying the A509 (H5 Portway), which runs between the east and west of the city, providing links to M1 Junction 14 (approximately 1 mile (1.6 km) to the north-east), and Central Milton Keynes and the A5 (approximately 1.5 miles (2.4 km) and 2.5 miles (4.0 km) to the south-west, respectively).

Beside the North lake is the Peace Pagoda and Nipponzan-Myōhōji Buddhist temple.
