= Public art in Milton Keynes =

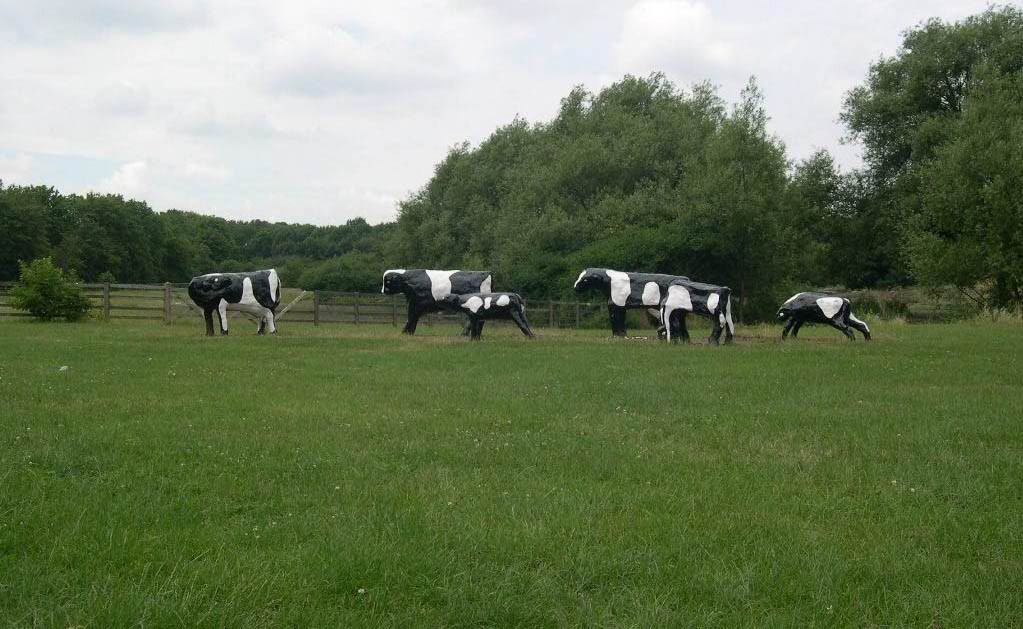
Liz Leyh's Concrete Cows

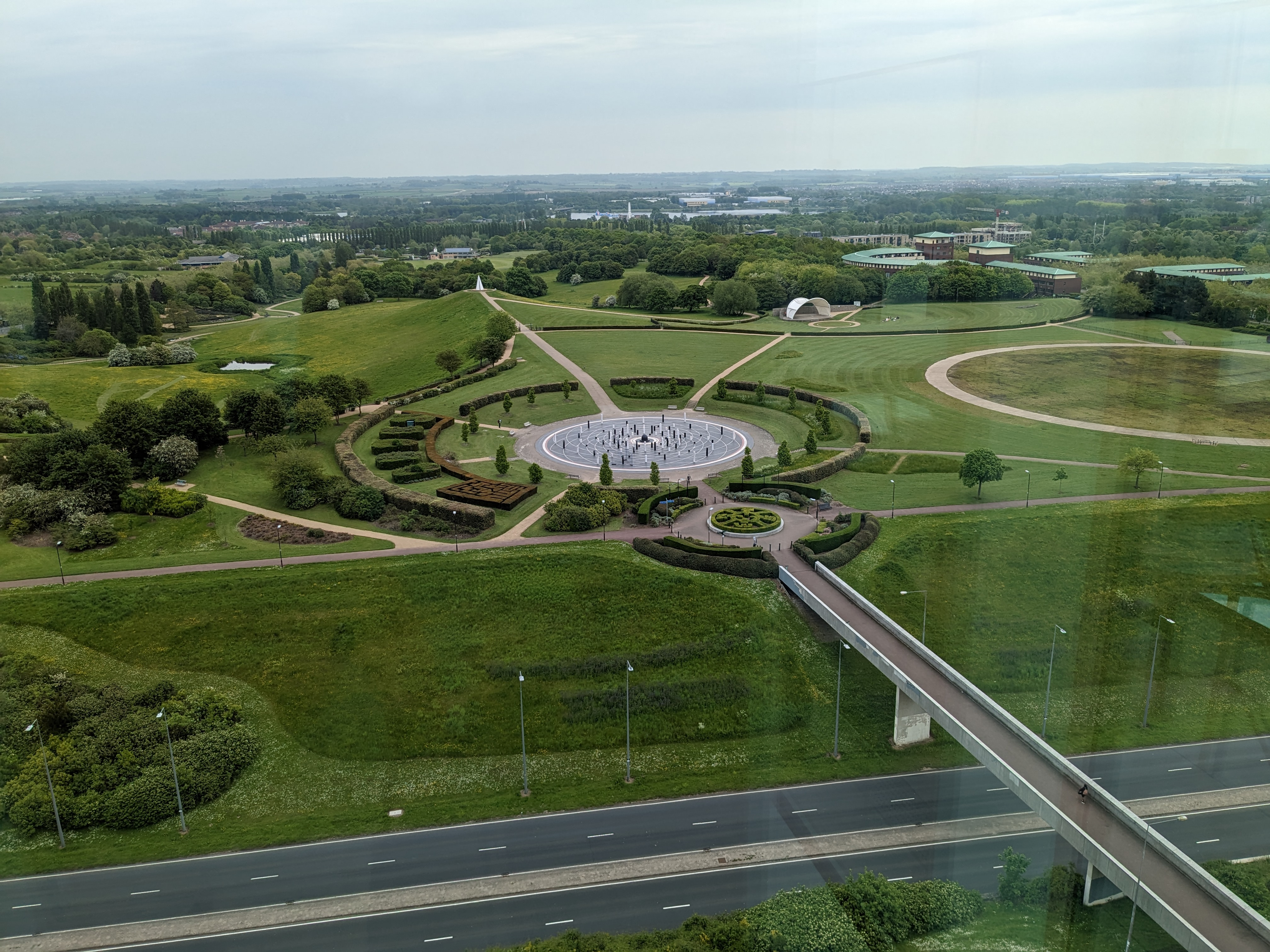
Campbell Park has a number of outdoor sculptures. This image features the Milton Keynes Rose in the foreground and the Light Pyramid in the background.

Milton Keynes in England has a collection of modern art, primarily sculpture, in its public buildings and open spaces.

== Art works ==
The Milton Keynes Development Corporation had an ambitious public art programme and over 50 works were commissioned, mostly still extant. This programme also had two strands: a public engagement one which involved the local community in the works. The most famous of these is Liz Leyh's Concrete Cows, a group of concrete Friesian cows which have become the unofficial logo of the city.

There is also a tradition of abstract geometrical art hanging in the Milton Keynes Shopping Centre. One such piece is Liliane Lijn's Circle of Light and another is the The Time Machine 'Frog Clock' by Kit Williams.

Another of Lijn's work, the Light Pyramid (2012), is a feature of Campbell Park.

In Central Milton Keynes, Octo (1979–80) by Wendy Moore (a stainless steel sculpture set in a reflecting pool), is a Grade II listed structure.
