= List of schools in Milton Keynes =

This is a list of schools in the City of Milton Keynes, in the English county of Buckinghamshire.

== State-funded schools ==
=== Primary schools ===
- Abbeys Primary School, Bletchley
- Ashbrook School, Two Mile Ash
- Barleyhurst Park Primary School, Bletchley
- Bishop Parker RC Primary School, Bletchley
- Bow Brickhill CE Primary School, Bow Brickhill
- Bradwell Village School, Bradwell
- Brooklands Farm Primary School, Brooklands
- Brooksward School, Neath Hill
- Broughton Fields Primary School, Broughton
- Bushfield School, Wolverton
- Caroline Haslett Primary School, Shenley Lodge
- Castlethorpe First School, Castlethorpe
- Cedars Primary School, Newport Pagnell
- Chestnuts Primary School, Bletchley
- Christ The Sower Ecumenical Primary School, Grange Farm
- Cold Harbour CE School, Bletchley
- Downs Barn School, Downs Barn
- Drayton Park School, Bletchley
- Emerson Valley School, Emerson Valley
- Fairfields Primary School, Fairfields
- Falconhurst School, Eaglestone
- Germander Park School, Conniburrow
- Giffard Park Primary School, Giffard Park
- Giles Brook Primary School, Tattenhoe
- Glastonbury Thorne School, Shenley Church End
- Glebe Farm School, Glebe Farm
- Great Linford Primary School, Great Linford
- Green Park Primary School, Newport Pagnell
- Greenleys First School, Greenleys
- Greenleys Juniors School, Greenleys
- Hanslope Primary School, Hanslope
- Haversham Village School, Haversham
- Heelands School, Heelands
- Heronsgate School, Walnut Tree
- Heronshaw School, Walnut Tree
- Heronshill School and Nursery, Kents Hill
- Holmwood School, Great Holm
- Holne Chase Primary School, Bletchley
- Howe Park School, Emerson Valley
- Jubilee Wood Primary School, Fishermead
- Kents Hill Park School, Kents Hill
- Knowles Primary School, Bletchley
- Langland Community School, Netherfield
- Lavendon School, Lavendon
- Lift Charles Warren Academy, Simpson
- Long Meadow School, Shenley Brook End
- Loughton Manor First School, Loughton
- Loughton School, Loughton
- Merebrook Infant School, Furzton
- Middleton Primary School, Middleton
- Monkston Primary School, Monkston
- Moorland Primary School, Beanhill
- New Bradwell School, New Bradwell
- New Chapter Primary School, Coffee Hall
- Newton Blossomville CE School, Newton Blossomville
- Newton Leys Primary School, Newton Leys
- North Crawley CE School, North Crawley
- Oakgrove School, Oakgrove
- Oldbrook First School, Oldbrook
- Olney Infant Academy, Olney
- Olney Middle School, Olney
- Orchard Academy, Springfield
- Oxley Park Academy, Oxley Park
- Pepper Hill School, Bradville
- Portfields Primary School, Newport Pagnell
- The Premier Academy, Bletchley
- Priory Common School, Bradwell
- Priory Rise School, Tattenhoe Park
- Rickley Park Primary Academy, Bletchley
- Russell Street School, Stony Stratford
- St Andrew's CE Infants School, Great Linford
- St Bernadette's RC Primary School, Monkston
- St Mary & St Giles CE School, Stony Stratford
- St Mary Magdalene RC Primary School, Greenleys
- St Mary's Wavendon CE Primary School, Eagle Farm
- St Monica's RC Primary School, Neath Hill
- St Thomas Aquinas RC Primary School, Bletchley
- Shepherdswell Academy, Springfield
- Sherington CE School, Sherington
- Southwood School, Conniburrow
- Stanton School, Bradville
- Stoke Goldington CE School, Stoke Goldington
- Summerfield School, Bradwell Common
- Tickford Park Primary School, Newport Pagnell
- Two Mile Ash School, Two Mile Ash
- Water Hall Primary School, Bletchley
- Watling Primary School, Whitehouse
- Wavendon Gate School, Wavendon Gate
- Whitehouse Primary School, Whitehouse
- Willen Primary School, Willen
- The Willows School, Fishermead
- Wood End Infant & Pre-School, Stantonbury
- Wyvern School, Wolverton

=== Secondary schools ===
- Denbigh School, Shenley Church End
- Glebe Farm School, Glebe Farm
- The Hazeley Academy, Hazeley
- Kents Hill Park School, Kents Hill
- Lord Grey Academy, Bletchley
- Milton Keynes Academy, Leadenhall
- Oakgrove School, Middleton
- Ousedale School, Newport Pagnell/Olney
- The Radcliffe School, Wolverton
- St Paul's Catholic School, Leadenhall
- Shenley Brook End School, Shenley Brook End
- Sir Herbert Leon Academy, Bletchley
- Stantonbury School, Stantonbury
- Walton High School, Walnut Tree/Brooklands
- Watling Academy, Whitehouse

=== Special and alternative schools ===
- Bridge Academy, Coffee Hall
- Milton Keynes Primary Pupil Referral Unit, Bletchley
- The Redway School, Netherfield
- Romans Field School, Bletchley
- Slated Row School, Kents Hill
- Stephenson Academy, Stantonbury
- White Spire School, Bletchley
- The Woodlands School, Hazeley

=== Further education ===
- Milton Keynes College

== Independent schools ==
=== Primary and preparatory schools ===
- Broughton Manor Preparatory School, Broughton
- The Grove Independent School, Loughton
- Milton Keynes Preparatory School, Bletchley

=== Senior and all-through schools ===
- Baytul Ilm Secondary School, Denbigh
- Webber Independent School, Stantonbury

=== Special and alternative schools ===
- Cambian Bletchley Park School, Bletchley
- KWS Milton Keynes, Bletchley
- Willow Park School, Little Linford
