= Broughton and Milton Keynes =

Civil parish in the United Kingdom

Coordinates: 52.046°N 0.701°W

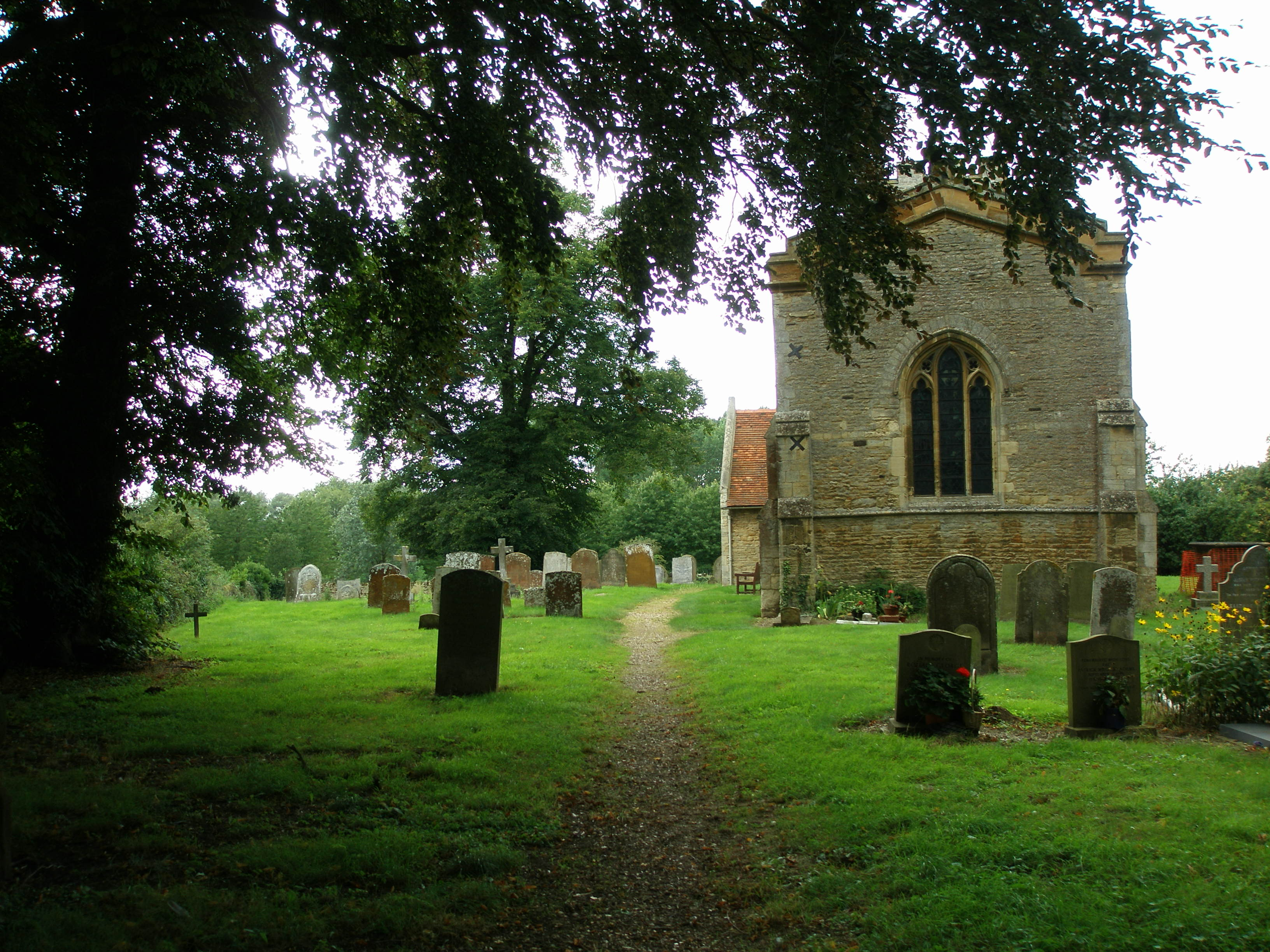
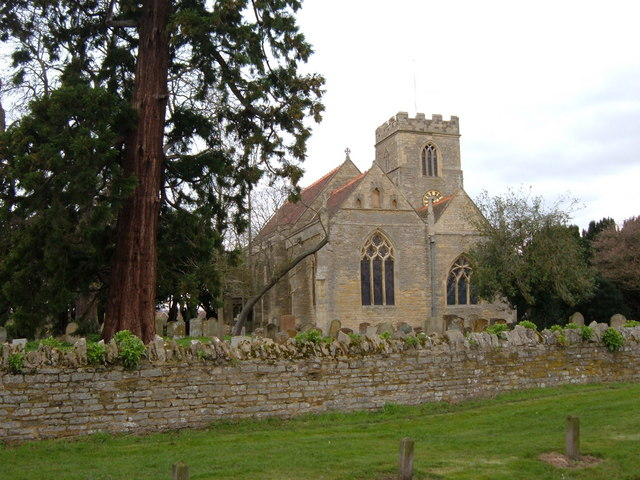
- Church of St Lawrence, Broughton All Saints Church, Milton Keynes Village

- Location within Buckinghamshire
- Interactive map of Broughton and Milton Keynes
- Population: 18,629 (2021 Census)
- OS grid reference: SP892394
- Civil parish: Broughton and Milton Keynes
- Unitary authority: Milton Keynes City Council
- Ceremonial county: Buckinghamshire
- Region: South East
- Country: England
- Sovereign state: United Kingdom
- Post town: Milton Keynes
- Postcode district: MK10
- Dialling code: 01908
- Police: Thames Valley
- Fire: Buckinghamshire
- Ambulance: South Central
- UK Parliament: Milton Keynes Central
- Website: http://www.broughtonandmkv-pc.gov.uk/

Broughton and Milton Keynes is a civil parish in the City of Milton Keynes unitary authority, Buckinghamshire, England.

The parish includes the combined area of the former (separate) civil parishes of Broughton and of Milton Keynes, on the eastern side of the city. After many years operating together under a joint parish council, the parishes merged to become a single unit with effect from 1 January 2025. At the 2021 census, the two original parishes had a combined population of 18,629.

== Areas of the parish ==
- Brooklands is primarily a housing area: a building of note is the Brooklands Campus of Walton High School, whose main campus is in Walnut Tree.
- Broughton, originally a small village, is now a substantial residential area with the original village at its northern edge.
  - Atterbury Park is a small nature reserve at the northeastern edge of Broughton
  - Brook Furlong, beside J13 of the M1 Motorway, is the site of the Milton Keynes Coachway and the Park and Ride.
- Fox Milne is an area of light industry, overlooking Willen Lake.
- Middleton surrounds Milton Keynes Village: its name is the same as the original name of the village.
- Northfield is a small triangle of light industry and warehousing between Fox Milne and Broughton.
- Oakgrove is a mixed residential, retail and employment area. Oakgrove School is actually in Middleton.
- Pineham is a small district enclosed by the M1, Portway (H5/A509) and Tongwell Street (V11). (Note: The name 'Pineham' was used for an electoral ward for Milton Keynes Council elections from 1976 (to 2002). It consisted of the parishes of Woolstone-cum-Willen, Moulsoe, Broughton, Milton Keynes and Walton.) Most of its area is taken up by Anglian Water's sewage treatment plant and a BMX track.
