= Oakgrove, Milton Keynes =

Area in Milton Keynes, Buckinghamshire, England

Coordinates: 52.04°N 0.72°W

Oakgrove is a district of Milton Keynes in Buckinghamshire, England, in the civil parish of Broughton and Milton Keynes. The district includes a small retail centre consisting of a Waitrose Supermarket, a Metro Bank branch, and other small services units. A large portion of the district is reserved as linear park to accommodate the flood plain of the river Ouzel, a tributary of the river Great Ouse.

== Location ==
Oakgrove is bounded by the grid roads Brickhill St (V10) to the east, Chaffron Way (H7) to the south, and by the Ouzel to the west and north. Oakgrove is a small district because it is nominally in the same grid square as the Woolstones (to its west) but is separated from them by the wide flood plain of the Ouzel, which is a linear park in normal times. To its east lies Middleton and to its south lies Monkston Park. The city centre, Central Milton Keynes, is located 2 miles (3.2 km) to the north-west of the district, whilst the Kingston District Centre is located 1.5 miles (2.4 km) to the south-east.

The district is a relatively small one since it takes up just the eastern part of its grid square, which it shares with Woolstone (separated by the Ouzel valley) and Springfield (by the Grand Union Canal).

== History and archaeology ==
The name of the district is based on a 1685 estate map, which use the name Oak Grove for a part of this area. Much of it was a quarry in historic times, providing stone for nearby Broughton. and consequently, despite appearances, is treated as a brownfield site for planning purposes.

Archaeological investigations of the district revealed a Bronze Age barrow, a Saxon farm, and an Iron Age village and well.

== See also ==
- Oakgrove School and leisure centre, which is in next-door Middleton, just across Brickhill St.
