= Willen =

District of Milton Keynes, England

Coordinates: 52.06311°N 0.71922°W

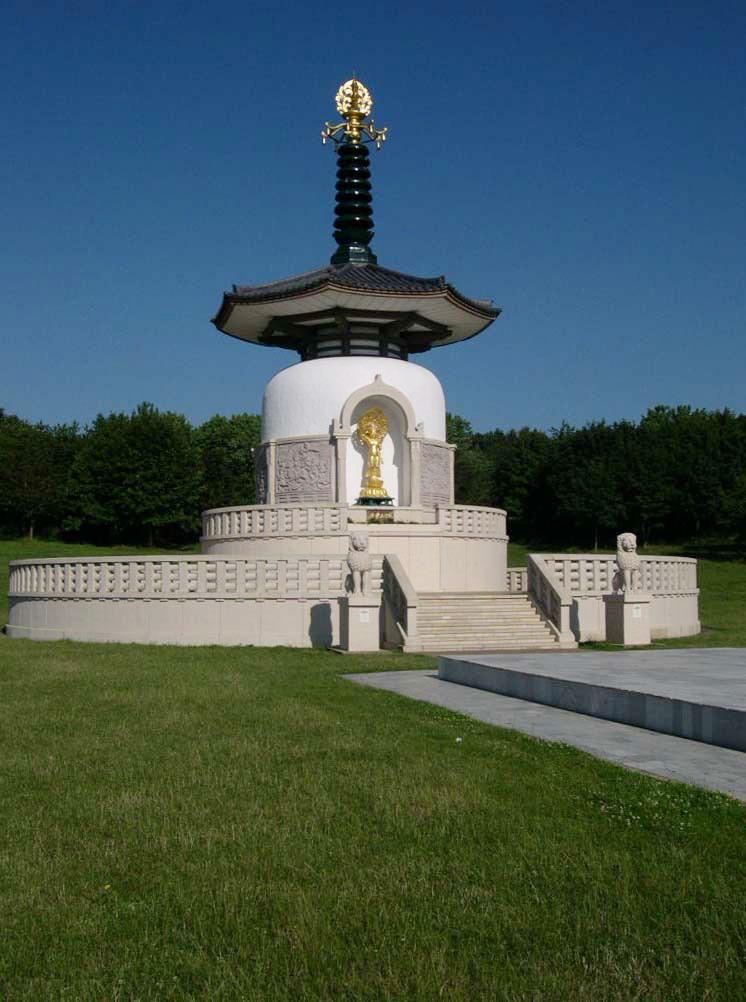
- The Peace Pagoda (Stupa)

- Location within Buckinghamshire
- Interactive map of Willen
- OS grid reference: SP877413
- Civil parish: Campbell Park
- Unitary authority: Milton Keynes
- Ceremonial county: Buckinghamshire
- Region: South East
- Country: England
- Sovereign state: United Kingdom
- Post town: MILTON KEYNES
- Postcode district: MK15
- Dialling code: 01908
- Police: Thames Valley
- Fire: Buckinghamshire
- Ambulance: South Central
- UK Parliament: Milton Keynes North

Willen is a district of Milton Keynes, England and is also one of the ancient villages of Buckinghamshire to have been included in the designated area of the New City in 1967. The original village is now a small but important part of the larger district that contains it and to which it gives its name. It is in the civil parish of Campbell Park.

== History ==
The village was first recorded as Wilinges (12th century) and later as Wylie, Wilies (13th century); Wilne, Wylyene (14th century); and Wyllyen, Wyllyn (15th century). Willen is not recorded by name in the Domesday Survey, but it can be identified with the 4 hides 1 virgate assessed under Caldecote, part of the neighbouring parish of Moulsoe, and held under the Count of Mortain by Alvered. The name Willen is probably from Anglo-Saxon or Old English meaning (at the) 'willows', the adjacent River Ouzel meanders through land ideal for willows. In 1931 the civil parish had a population of 57. On 1 April 1934 the parish was abolished and merged with Great and Little Woolstone to form "Woolstone cum Willen".

== Environment and amenities ==
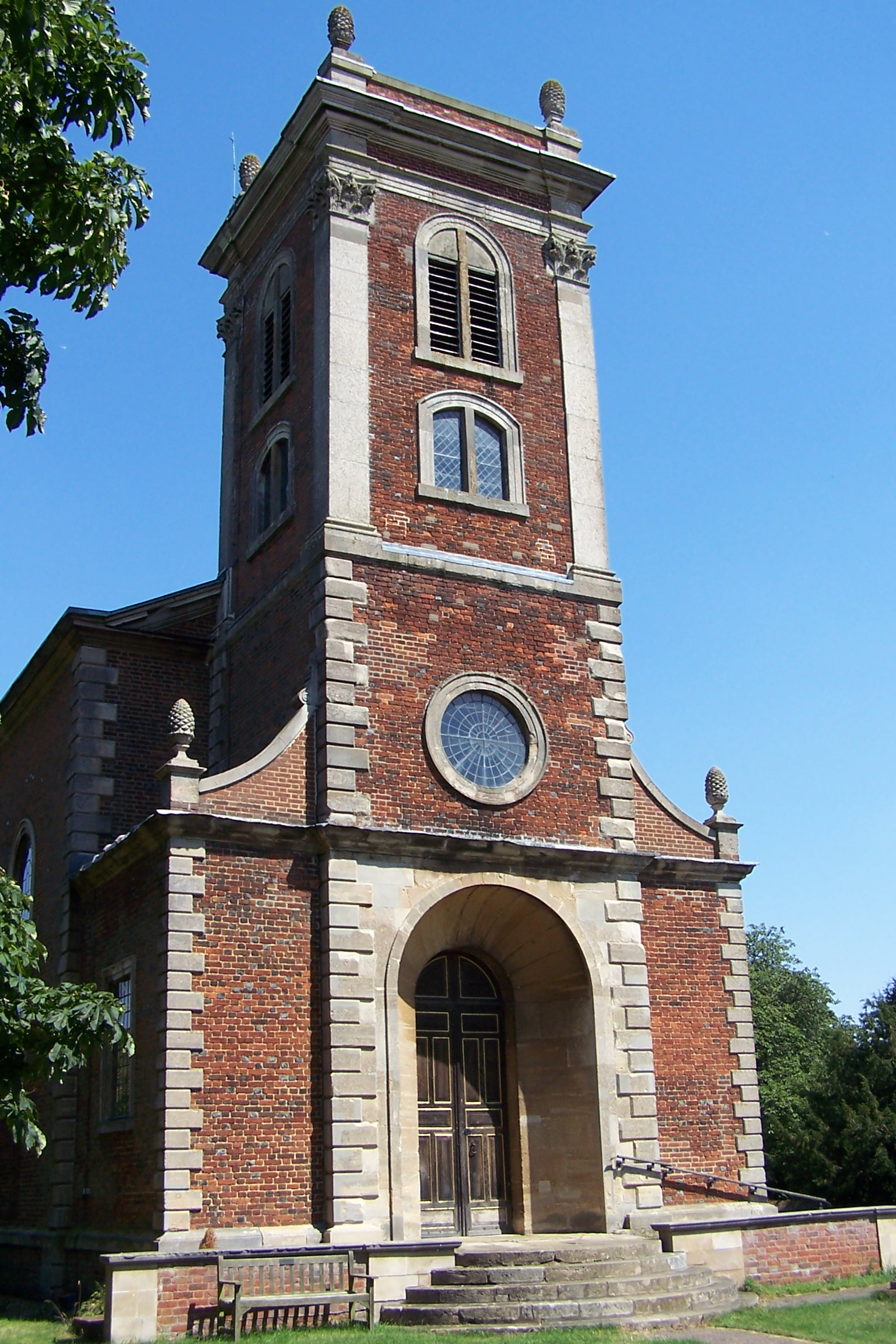
Church of St Mary Magdalene, Willen (designed by Robert Hooke)

=== Religious ===
The parish church of St Mary Magdalene (1680), designed by the architect and physicist Robert Hooke, is a classic of the early English Baroque period and is listed at Grade I.

Further around the lake, there is a Buddhist temple and monastery, together with a large stupa, the Milton Keynes Peace Pagoda built in 1980 by the monks and nuns of the Nipponzan-Myōhōji. It was the first to be built in the western hemisphere. There is a grass labyrinth nearby.

St Michael's Priory is small Benedictine house in the village.

=== Willen Hospice ===
Overlooking the lake, Willen Hospice provides specialist care for people whose illness no longer responds to curative treatment (also known as specialist palliative care).

=== Willen Lake ===
One of the more important features of the district is a large balancing lake on the River Ouzel, designed to capture flash floods lest they cause problems down stream. The lake is split into two halves. The north lake is a wild-life sanctuary and a favourite of migrating aquatic birds, overlooked by the Peace Pagoda and the Hospice. The south lake is for leisure use, with a full watersports and boat hire centre, as well as inflatable aqua park and wakeboarding facility. There are many paths around the lake suitable for walking, running or cycling. The south lake also comprises a children's splash park and a high ropes course, as well as playing host to various events throughout the year.

==== Bird Life ====
In its history, many rare and scarce migrating birds have turned up on the north side of the lake. The island is primarily for bird life. Many common bird species breed on the spit that can be viewed from the only hide on the lake, the north hide.

=== Sports ===
The district is also home to Willen Cricket Club and to Willen Juniors FC, who both play at Willen Fields on Portland Drive.
