= Killing of Leah Croucher =

2019 kidnapping and murder

- Location: Milton Keynes, Buckinghamshire, England
- Date: c. 15 February 2019
- Victim: Leah Croucher
- Accused: Neil Maxwell
- Verdict: Unlawful killing

On 15 February 2019, Leah Croucher, a 19-year-old British teenager, disappeared on her morning walk to work from Emerson Valley to Knowlhill in Milton Keynes, Buckinghamshire, England. In October 2022, her remains were found in a property in Furzton.

An inquest in June 2024 concluded that Croucher had been unlawfully killed on or around 15 February by Neil Maxwell, a convicted sex offender. Maxwell had hanged himself in April 2019, two months after her disappearance.

== Disappearance ==
At approximately 08:00 GMT on 15 February 2019, 19-year-old Leah Croucher left her home on Quantock Crescent in the Emerson Valley area of Milton Keynes, Buckinghamshire, to begin her two-mile (3 km) walk to her work at a direct debit collection agency in Knowlhill. She did not arrive for her 09:00 shift, and was reported missing by her parents after not returning that evening.

Croucher was last seen on CCTV at 08:16 on Buzzacott Lane in Furzton, walking in the direction of her work. Someone matching her description was seen nearby at about 08:20. Croucher's phone left the mobile network at about 08:34 and did not reconnect.

Three separate witnesses reported seeing someone matching her description between 09:30 and 11:15, walking near Furzton Lake. The witnesses said that she looked visibly upset and crying while talking on the phone. Police have not confirmed if these sightings were that of Croucher.

Thames Valley Police (TVP) described Croucher as white, 5 ft 2 in (1.57 m) tall, of slim build, with below-shoulder-length brown hair and sometimes wearing glasses. She was last seen dressed in a black coat, skinny black jeans, and black Converse high-top shoes, and was carrying a small black rucksack.

== Police investigation ==
In a public appeal for information to help find Croucher, TVP released CCTV footage of her. On 18 February, the police began searching Furzton Lake for evidence and continued the search for a number of days. They also searched Blue Lagoon Local Nature Reserve in Water Eaton after a report of clothing matching Croucher's.

TVP officers visited more than 4,000 homes, including 2 Loxbeare Drive (where her remains were later found), which was visited on at least two occasions during door-to-door inquiries in the search, but there was no answer. The force also deployed specialist search teams, drones, and helicopters. Marine units and dive teams were used during searches of lakes across Milton Keynes. Nothing was recovered during any search.

On the anniversary of her disappearance, an initial reward was doubled to £10,000.

=== Murder inquiry and inquest ===
On 10 October 2022, Croucher's rucksack and personal possessions were found at a residential property, 2 Loxbeare Drive in Furzton, Milton Keynes, less than 1 mile (2 km) from her home. A handyman had been tasked with investigating a foul smell in the property, and Croucher's remains were found concealed in plastic bags in the attic space of the house.

Although formal identification of the remains had yet to be completed, TVP announced that they were conducting a murder inquiry. On 14 October, a police spokesperson named Neil Maxwell, a convicted sex offender, as their prime suspect. Maxwell was employed to maintain the Loxbeare Drive property, and was the only person with access to the house at the time. The owners of the property lived overseas and were not in the UK at the time Croucher went missing. In April 2019, two months after her disappearance, Maxwell had hanged himself in a bike shed at Mainstay Court, a block of flats 2.5 miles (4.0 km) away near Campbell Park.

In June 2024, the inquest concluded that on or around the date she went missing, Croucher had been unlawfully killed by Maxwell, probably in an "unwarranted sex attack". The cause of her death could not be determined.

== Media ==
Croucher's disappearance was covered in a September 2019 episode of Crimewatch Live, which included an interview with her mother.

== See also ==
- List of solved missing person cases
- List of unsolved deaths
- United Kingdom missing people charity
