= Whitehouse, Milton Keynes =

Civil parish in Milton Keynes, England

Coordinates: 52.033°N 0.8156°W

Whitehouse
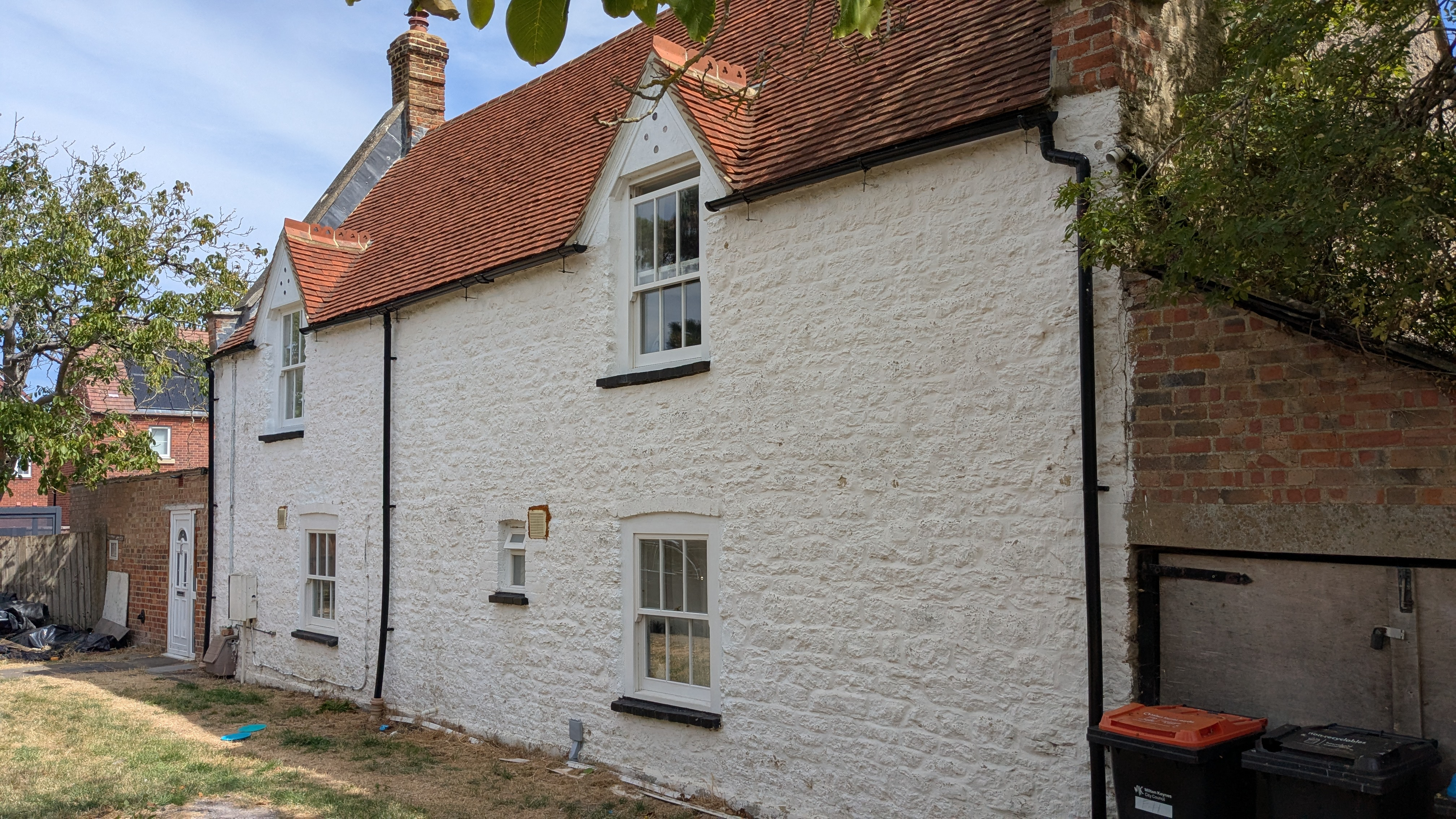
- The original Whutehouse Farm

- Location within Buckinghamshire
- Interactive map of Whitehouse
- Population: 3,341 (2021 census)
- OS grid reference: SP813378
- Civil parish: Whitehouse
- District: City of Milton Keynes
- Unitary authority: Milton Keynes City Council
- Ceremonial county: Buckinghamshire
- Region: South East
- Country: England
- Sovereign state: United Kingdom
- Post town: MILTON KEYNES
- Postcode district: MK8
- Dialling code: 01908
- Police: Thames Valley
- Fire: Buckinghamshire
- Ambulance: South Central
- UK Parliament: Milton Keynes North

Whitehouse is a neighbourhood and civil parish that covers a large new development area on the western flank of Milton Keynes in Buckinghamshire, England. As the first tier of Local Government, its community council is responsible for the people who live or work in this area of Milton Keynes. In 2021 the parish had a population of 3,341.

It is bounded by Calverton Lane (the Monks Way (H3) alignment) to the north, Watling Street (V4) to the east, Dansteed Way (H4) to the south and, as of October 2022, a hedgerow line (Note: roughly on the alignment of Tattenhoe Street (V2). The parish boundary extends further southwest.) to the southwest. The district covers 228 hectares (560 acres) (including open space) and is projected to have 4,400 homes and 6.5 hectares (16 acres) of employment land.

At the 2021 Census, relatively early in the development, the population had reached 3,341.

== Origins ==
The (greenfield) land it occupies was previously part of Whitehouse Farm, then part of Calverton parish. In 2004, the Government decided on the further expansion of Milton Keynes and accordingly designated land on the eastern and western flanks of the city for this purpose. Along with the adjacent parish of Fairfields (and Broughton on the eastern flank), this district is part of the implementation of that decision.

In addition to Whitehouse Farm, the development area also includes part of the lands of the former Shenley Dens farm. The farmhouse of the latter was a Grade II listed building, just outside the edge of the current (2023) development area but within the parish boundary. After being allowed to become dilapidated, it was destroyed by arson in August 2024. There are two other farms in the south-west of the parish, Shenley Grounds Farm and Weald Leys Farm. As of November 2023, both are outside the development area.

== Electoral ward (City Council) ==
As of 2025, the parish is one of the components of the Stony Stratford ward of the Milton Keynes City Council.

== Schools ==
There are three schools in the parish, two primary schools and one secondary school: Whitehouse Primary School, Watling Primary School, and Watling Academy, a secondary school.
