= Caldecote, Buckinghamshire =

Hamlet in City of Milton Keynes, England

Coordinates: 52°04′20″N 0°43′09″W

Caldecote
- Location within Buckinghamshire
- Interactive map of Caldecote
- District: City of Milton Keynes
- Unitary authority: Milton Keynes City Council
- Ceremonial county: Buckinghamshire
- Region: South East
- Country: England
- Sovereign state: United Kingdom

Caldecote (pronounced "Kal-de-COAT) is a hamlet in the civil parish of Moulsoe in the City of Milton Keynes, Buckinghamshire, England, situated roughly 1 mile (1.6 km) south of Newport Pagnell, and roughly 3 miles (4.8 km) north-east of Central Milton Keynes.

== History ==
The place name is fairly common in England and comes from an Old English term meaning "cold cottage", referring to a resting place for travellers or other strangers on the road. The original Northampton to London road runs nearby. The route was diverted in 1728 along a new road on the higher ground east of the village, causing the latter to decline.

Caldecote was recorded in the Domesday Book as Caldecote.

The place name was once used elsewhere in Buckinghamshire in the ancient village adjacent to Bedgrove.

== Location ==
The modern area is the triangle defined by the M1 motorway, the A422 road and the A509 road. Originally mostly farmland, part is designated as urban open space since it is substantially within the flood plain of the River Ouzel (or Lovat). In the plans for Milton Keynes East, much of the area outside the flood plain has been redesignated for housing and commercial development. The triangle bounded by the M1, Willen Road and the A422 Momks Way is already covered by two warehouses build speculatively for Panattoni.

== See also ==
There is also another ancient village (and now a modern development and balancing lake) in nearby Walton (civil parish), with the very similar name of Caldecotte.
