= Church of St Mary Magdalene, Willen =

Church in Buckinghamshire, England

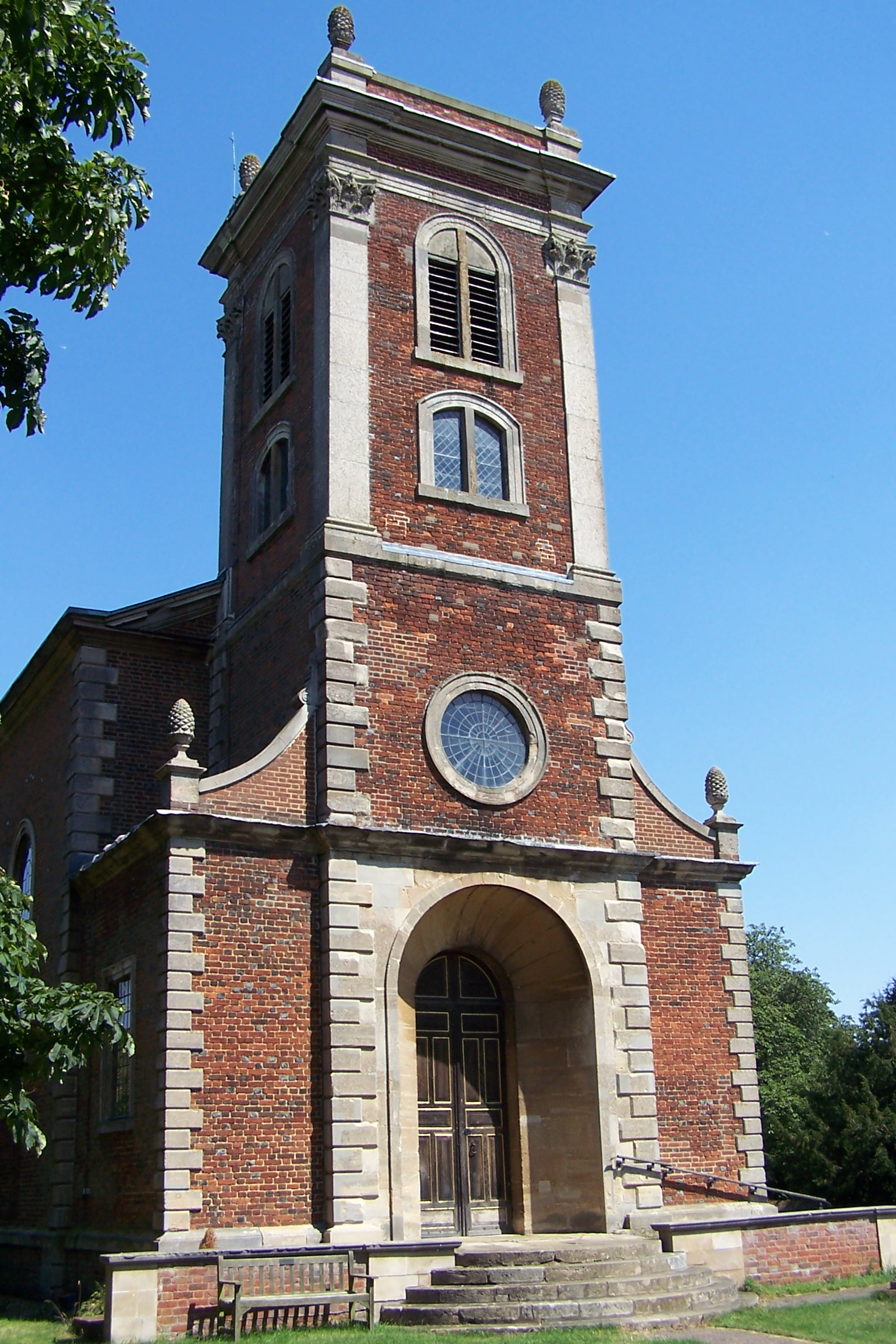
- Church of St Mary Magdalene, Willen
- Church of St Mary Magdalene, Willen
- 52°03′44″N 0°43′13″W
- Location: Willen, Milton Keynes
- Country: England
- Denomination: Church of England

Architecture
- Architect: Robert Hooke
- Style: English Baroque
- Years built: 1680

Administration
- Diocese: Diocese of Oxford
- Parish: Willen

The Church of St Mary Magdalene is an Anglican church of the Diocese of Oxford. Named after Jesus' companion Mary Magdalene, it is located in the village of Willen, in Milton Keynes, Buckinghamshire. It was completed in 1680 and was designed by the scientist, inventor, and architect Robert Hooke. It was designated as a Grade I listed building in 1966.

== History ==
The current church stands in the place of an older one that resembled the church in Great Woolston, but without a turret, the two bells belonging to it hanging in arches, as at Little Linford. The church was commissioned and paid for by Richard Busby, the long-serving headmaster of Westminster School, who was also the local Lord of the manor in the village of Willen. The building was designed by former Westminster pupil Robert Hooke, who also supervised its construction. (Note: In addition to his work as an architect, Hooke was the curator of experiments of the Royal Society, Secretary to its council, the Gresham Professor of Geometry, and Surveyor of the City of London after the Great Fire of 1666.) Work on the church was probably carried out during the period 1678–80. The project cost Dr. Busby nearly £5,000, (Note: Which equates to about £0.96 million today, using the Retail Prices Index.) not including the materials taken from the former edifice. George Lipscomb observed that "with good management the church might have been built for a third part of the money".

In the 19th century, the building was modified by removing the cupola from the tower and adding an apse at the end of the church's nave. This was a reversal of Hooke's original architectural intention, which was to combine a simple nave with a decorative tower.

The Willen parish registers date back to the year 1665.
