= Woolstone, Milton Keynes =

Village in Milton Keynes, UK

Coordinates: 52°02′37″N 00°43′35″W

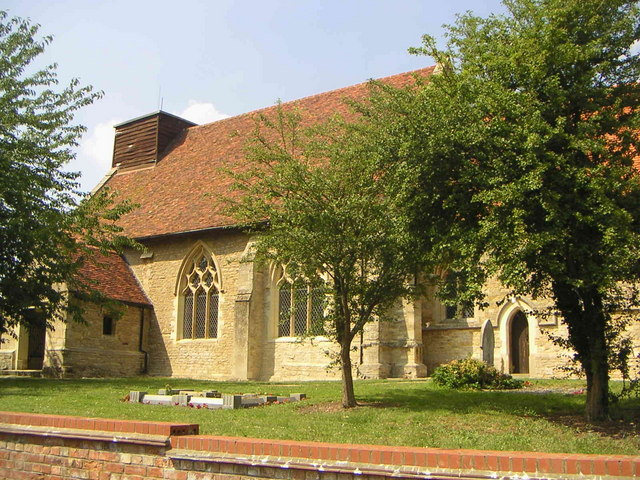
Holy Trinity Church, Little Woolstone

Great Woolstone and Little Woolstone are two historic villages in modern Milton Keynes, Buckinghamshire that are now called jointly Woolstone or The Woolstones and form the heart of a new district of that name, in the Campbell Park civil parish. At the 2011 Census, the population of the district was included in the figure for the civil parish and not reported separately.

== History ==
Little Woolstone Inclosure Act 1791
- Act of Parliament
- Parliament of Great Britain
- Long title: An Act for dividing, allotting, and enclosing the Open and Common Fields, Common Meadows, Common Pastures, Waste and other Commonable Lands and Grounds, in the Parish of Little Woolston, in the County of Bucks.
- Citation: 31 Geo. 3. c. 21 Pr.
- Territorial extent: Great Britain

Dates
- Royal assent: 11 April 1791
- Commencement: 10 August 1790 (Note: Start of session.)
Other legislation
| Relates to | Great Woolstone Inclosure Act 1796 |

Status: Current legislation

Great Woolstone Inclosure Act 1796
- Act of Parliament
- Parliament of Great Britain
- Long title: An act for dividing and inclosing the open and common fields, common pastures, common meadows, and other commonable lands and grounds, in the parish of Great Woolstone, in the county of Buckingham.
- Citation: 36 Geo. 3. c. 12 Pr.
- Territorial extent: Great Britain

Dates
- Royal assent: 7 March 1796
- Commencement: 7 March 1796 (Note: The Acts of Parliament (Commencement) Act 1793.)
Other legislation
| Relates to | Little Woolstone Inclosure Act 1791 |

Status: Current legislation

The name 'Woolstone' is an Old English language word, and means 'Wulfsige's farm'. In the Domesday Book of 1086, Great Woolstone was recorded as Ulsiestone. and Little Woolstone as Wlsiestone. Little Woolstone was enclosed by the Little Woolstone Inclosure Act 1791 (31 Geo. 3. c. 21 Pr.), and Great Woolstone by the Great Woolstone Inclosure Act 1796 (36 Geo. 3. c. 12 Pr.).

Until shortly after the turn of the 19th century, Little Woolstone was named Parva Woolstone. The area is now collectively known simply as "Woolstone" or "The Woolstones". The land between the two villages is now occupied by the village cricket green.

They are both linear villages, being hemmed in by and along the north–south line of both the River Ouzel (to the east of the villages) and of the Grand Union Canal to the west. They form part of a chain of three villages along this line, the next about a mile further south being Woughton-on-the-Green.

== The Woolstones today ==
Today, Great Woolstone still has its own village pub, the thatched-roof "Cross Keys", which can trace its history back to 1560. Little Woolstone is the larger of the two Woolstones, having benefited from the building of the canal. Its village pub, "The Barge Inn", dates from this time, being opened to meet the needs of the canal labourers, but is now mainly a restaurant. The Church of England parish church of the Holy Trinity in Little Woolstone now serves both villages; the church in Great Woolstone closed in the 1970s and has served various purposes since then including being used as a music rehearsal room.

The old village centre seems only a little changed from its description in Buckinghamshire Footpaths in 1949:

Pass through Woughton-on-the-Green, bearing slightly rightward, towards a trio of delightful hamlets, each "a one-eyed, blinking sort of place", Great Woolstone, Little Woolstone, and Willen. ....

Great Woolstone, or Vlieston as it was called at the time of Domesday, was held, under Walter Giffard, of the foreign monks of Saint Peter de Culture, and is now in the possession of the Selby-Lowndes, one of the oldest families in the Kingdom, lords also of Whaddon away to the south-west.
“The Barge Inn”, along this lane, bears testimony to the hey-day of canal transport. I suppose that I have entered this place not less than fifty times, yet I have never seen a man there who did not carry a scythe, or wear leggings, or smoke a clay pipe, or talk of London as though it were a distant phantom thousands of miles away upon a faint horizon. Little Woolstone has an unexpected claim to fame, for it was a Woolstone man, one Smith, who invented and (wisely) patented the once-famous steam cultivator that ousted ox and horse, and was itself dethroned by the infernal combustion engine. In 1861 Mr. Smith’s steam cultivator ploughed up a crop of coins bearing as motto the words Regus et Regulus.

— J. H. B. Peel

== People ==
- Dorothy Wyndlow Pattison ("Sister Dora") was village schoolmistress in the parish of Little Woolston for three years from 1861; Pattison Lane, the main road through Woolstone, is named after her.
