= Fairfields =

Civil parish in Milton Keynes, Buckinghamshire, England

Coordinates: 52.044°N 0.8365°W

- Location within Buckinghamshire
- Interactive map of Fairfields
- Population: 2,536 (2021 census)
- OS grid reference: SP798390
- Civil parish: Fairfields
- District: City of Milton Keynes
- Unitary authority: Milton Keynes City Council
- Ceremonial county: Buckinghamshire
- Region: South East
- Country: England
- Sovereign state: United Kingdom
- Post town: MILTON KEYNES
- Postcode district: MK11 4
- Dialling code: 01908
- Police: Thames Valley
- Fire: Buckinghamshire
- Ambulance: South Central
- UK Parliament: Milton Keynes North
- Website: Fairfields Community Council

Fairfields is a neighbourhood and civil parish that covers a large new development area on the western flank of Milton Keynes, Buckinghamshire, England. As the first tier of Local Government, the parish council is responsible for the people who live and work in this area of Milton Keynes.

It is bounded by Calverton Lane (the Monks Way (H3) alignment west of Watling Street), Watling Street (V4), the Ridgeway (H1) reserve route, and a hedgerow line with Calverton CP. The district covers 123.5 hectares (305 acres) (including open space) and is projected to have 2,220 homes and 9 hectares (22 acres) of employment land. At the 2021 Census, relatively early in its development, the population had reached 2,536.

== Origins ==
The (greenfield) land it occupies was previously part of Fairfield Farm, in Calverton, a rural parish that is now just outside the Milton Keynes urban area. In 2004, the Government decided on the further expansion of Milton Keynes and accordingly designated land on the eastern and western flanks for this purpose. Along with the adjacent parish of Whitehouse (and Broughton on the eastern flank), this is the part of the implementation of that decision.
