= Watling Academy =

Free school in Milton Keynes, England

Location
- Barossa Way; Whitehouse; Milton Keynes, Buckinghamshire, MK8 1EP; England; 52.0315°N 0.8210°W

Information
- Type: Free school
- Motto: Respect, Responsibility and Kindness
- Established: 2020
- Trust: Denbigh Alliance Multi Academy Trust
- Department for Education URN: 147860 Tables
- Ofsted: Reports
- Headteacher: Emma Anderson
- Gender: Coeducational
- Age: 11 to 16
- Enrolment: 1,767
- Houses: 4
- Colours: Rutherford (Green), Turing (Blue), Laine (Red), Leyh (Orange)
- Website: https://watlingacademy.net/

Watling Academy is a coeducational secondary school located in the Whitehouse area of Milton Keynes, in the English county of Buckinghamshire.

== History ==
Construction of the school began in 2019, in anticipation of the planned demand for secondary school places from the large new developments on the western side of the city; the £40 million project to construct the school is on a 10-hectare (25-acre) site. The school formally opened on a temporary site in September 2020, and occupation of the new buildings began in June 2021.

== The school today ==
Watling Academy is a free school, and is part of the Denbigh Alliance Multi Academy Trust, which also operates Denbigh School in Shenley Church End.
