= Middleton, Milton Keynes =

Area of Milton Keynes, England

Coordinates: 52.0422°N 0.7047°W

Middleton
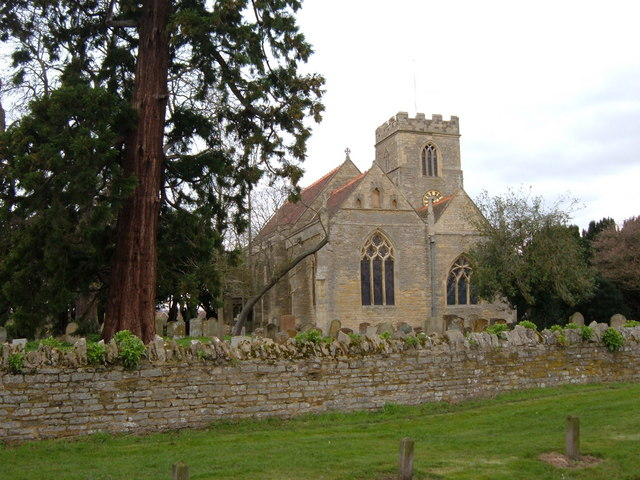
- All Saints' Church, Milton Keynes Village

- Location within Buckinghamshire
- Interactive map of Middleton
- Population: 8,172 (2021 census, Milton Keynes civil parish)
- OS grid reference: SP888390
- Civil parish: Broughton and Milton Keynes
- District: City of Milton Keynes
- Unitary authority: Milton Keynes City Council
- Ceremonial county: Buckinghamshire
- Region: South East
- Country: England
- Sovereign state: United Kingdom
- Post town: MILTON KEYNES
- Postcode district: MK10
- Dialling code: 01908
- Police: Thames Valley
- Fire: Buckinghamshire
- Ambulance: South Central
- UK Parliament: Milton Keynes Central

Middleton is an area of Milton Keynes (a modern city in Buckinghamshire, England) and part of the civil parish of Broughton and Milton Keynes. Its historic centre is Milton Keynes Village, the ancient village that in 1967 gave its name to the city of which it is now a small part. Middleton is delineated by Childs Way to the north, Tongwell Street to the east, Chaffron Way to the south and Brickhill Street to the west. The River Ouzel runs diagonally through it, from west to north.

== History ==
Name "Middelton Keynes", from Plea Rolls of the Court of Common Pleas, 1461 (Note: However, the names "Mydilton Keynes" and "Milton Keynes" appear on the same membrane of the Plea Roll, CP40/764, dated 1452.)

The village was originally known as Middeltone (11th century); then later as Middelton Kaynes or Caynes (13th century); Milton Keynes (15th century); and Milton alias Middelton Gaynes (17th century). Before the Conquest Queen Edith held this manor. A century after the Norman invasion, the manor transferred by marriage to Hugh de Kaynes, whose family held it to the late 13th century (as well as others in the country – Ashton Keynes in Wiltshire, Somerford Keynes in Gloucestershire, and Horsted Keynes in West Sussex). During this time the village became known as Middleton Keynes, eventually shortening to 'Milton Keynes'.

The original core village of the district, along Walton Road and Broughton Road, has retained its "Milton Keynes" road signs and has several rural village houses and a thatched pub which dates back to the 13th century. It is now known as "Milton Keynes Village".

== Education ==
Middleton has two schools, Middleton Primary School and Oakgrove School, a secondary comprehensive. Both were built in the early 2000s, in the southwest of the district.

== Community and leisure ==
There is a pub in the Milton Keynes Village, The Swan Inn. There is a village hall and pavilion. Recreational locations include Middleton Park, the Blue Funnel playground and The Poplar Plantation, a nature reserve. Leisure facilities include football, netball, martial arts and fencing. Other amenities include shops, church, allotments, medical clinic, defibrillators, and an eV charging station.

== Governance ==
=== Current ===
Middleton is administered for local affairs by Broughton and Milton Keynes parish council, the tier of local government below Milton Keynes City Council. It is in the Milton Keynes Village ward of the parish, the Broughton ward of the city council, and the Milton Keynes Central Westminster constituency of national government.

=== Civil parish ===
Early in the development of Milton Keynes (the city), the area surrounding Milton Keynes (the village) was given the name Middleton again – but the original civil parish remained as 'Milton Keynes', (Note: So Milton Keynes (the village) is in Middleton (the grid square), which is in Milton Keynes (the former civil parish), which was one of the many parishes in Milton Keynes (the city), which in turn is in the City of Milton Keynes unitary authority district. The modern city centre is a civil parish in its own right, called Central Milton Keynes.) and had a joint parish council with Broughton. From 1 January 2025, the parishes merged formally to become a single civil parish, 'Broughton and Milton Keynes'.
