= The Hazeley Academy =

Academy in Milton Keynes, England

Location
- Emperor Drive, Hazeley; Milton Keynes, Buckinghamshire, MK8 0PT; England
- Coordinates: 52.0199°N 0.8109°W

Information
- Type: Academy
- Motto: The Hazeley 5Cs - Character, Confidence, Creativity, Contributing, Community.
- Established: 2005
- Department for Education URN: 136844 Tables
- Ofsted: Reports
- Chair of Governors: Ekkehard Thumm
- Head of School: Toni Whiteman
- Gender: Coeducational
- Age: 11 to 19
- Enrolment: Over 1500
- Publication: The Hazeley Herald
- Website: http://www.thehazeleyacademy.com

The Hazeley Academy is an age 11 to 19 secondary school with sixth form in Hazeley on the western edge of Milton Keynes, United Kingdom.

== History ==
Originally opened as a Community School by Milton Keynes Council, following parent consultation the Hazeley School became a Foundation School on 1 January 2007. On 1 July 2011, again following consultation, it became an independent company, registered with Companies House: The Hazeley Academy.

In September 2008 the school was designated as a specialist Science College, by the Department for Children, Schools and Families (DCSF).

== Facilities ==
The school has a large field at the rear which has four full-sized football pitches and one rugby pitch. Situated at the back of the field is a small conservation area, which is dedicated to the Great Crested Newt. There are also a number of beehives used for the school's beekeeping club, with honey produced for commercial sale.

Construction of the school began in 2004 on land previously designated for industrial use. The building was completed in April 2010.

Originally planned to open in September 2005, the building work of phase one encountered problems. This phase consisted of the main spine - containing the two-floor library, gym, dance studio, sports hall, dining room and music department - and the first teaching wing.

Phase II opened in September 2007, adding another teaching wing and expanding the Learning Centre. Phase III added a further teaching wing, sports pavilion and training restaurant, Sixth Form and further specialist facilities. With Phase IV (a dedicated sixth form space and learning centre), the school reached its planned capacity in 2014.
