= The Redway School, Milton Keynes =

The Redway School

Location
- Farmborough; Netherfield; Milton Keynes, Buckinghamshire, MK6 4HG; England; 52.0237°N 0.7319°W

Information
- Type: Community special school
- Established: 26 April 1993
- Local authority: Borough of Milton Keynes
- Department for Education URN: 110592 Tables
- Ofsted: Reports
- Gender: Coeducational
- Age: 2 to 19
- Enrolment: ~100
- Website: http://www.theredway.net/

The Redway School is an all-age (2–19) state special school for children and young people who experience severe learning difficulties, serving the children of the City of Milton Keynes in Buckinghamshire, England. It is situated in the Netherfield district of southern Milton Keynes.

== History ==
The school opened on 26 April 1993, upon the closure of Oliver Wells (Physical Difficulties) and Queens (Severe Learning Difficulties) Schools. Until September 1993, the school had two sites, in Netherfield and at the Queens campus on Whalley Drive, Bletchley. From September 1993 and until about February/March 1997 the school occupied the Whalley Drive site whilst the Netherfield site was extended and refurbished.

The reason that the extension and refurbishment took so long was that the first scheme was not allowed to go ahead. It was called off in January 1994 by the Department for Education (DfE). This was because the local education authority, then Buckinghamshire County Council, had not complied with all the DfE requests and had not listened to the parents.

From 1 April 1997 the school became the responsibility of Milton Keynes City Council.

== Inspections ==
In February 2003 Ofsted's annual report named The Redway as a "particularly successful school". As of 2024, the school's most recent inspection was in 2023, with a judgement of Good.
