= Shenley Brook End School =

Academy in Milton Keynes, England

Coordinates: 52.0074°N 0.7898°W

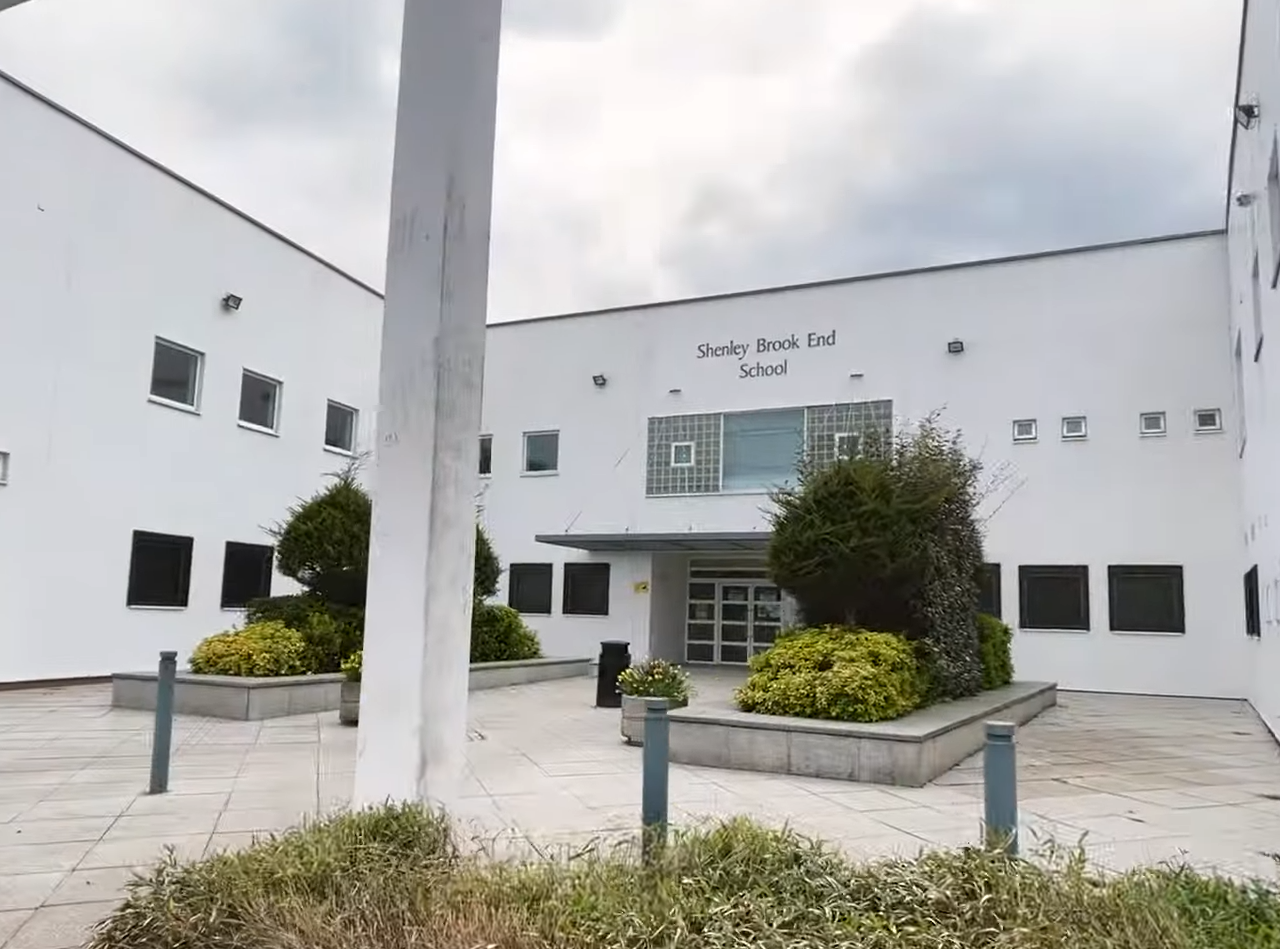
- SBE School

Location
- Walbank Grove; Milton Keynes, Buckinghamshire, MK5 7ZT; England

Information
- Type: Academy
- Established: 1997
- Local authority: Borough of Milton Keynes
- Trust: 5 Dimensions Trust
- Department for Education URN: 136730 Tables
- Ofsted: Reports
- Headteacher: Gareth McCluskey
- Gender: Coeducational
- Age: 11 to 18
- Enrolment: 1,803
- Houses: 5 (Chestnut, Hawthorn, Birch, Sycamore, Elm)
- Colours: Black and Red
- Website: https://www.sbeschool.org.uk/

Shenley Brook End School is a modern secondary academy school on the western flank of Milton Keynes (Buckinghamshire) in the civil parish of Shenley Brook End. The school opened in September 1997 with a small student body and currently has over 1700 pupils.

In 2014, the school planned to make a major extension costing £7 million to accommodate 300 extra 2015 entries. The extension started in late April 2015 and finished in the Easter holidays of April 2016. The project was managed by Morgan Sindall, and included the extension of the old main theatre, Sports Hall, and the library. The extension of the school also includes a new building called Phase 4, which includes additional Science laboratories and English classrooms.

== Specialist school status ==
Previously, Shenley Brook End School was known as a sporting school and was proud of its success in teaching in this field. However in September 2004, the Department for Education and Skills (DfES) designated the school as a specialist Mathematics and Computing College.
