= Moulsoe =

Village in Buckinghamshire, England

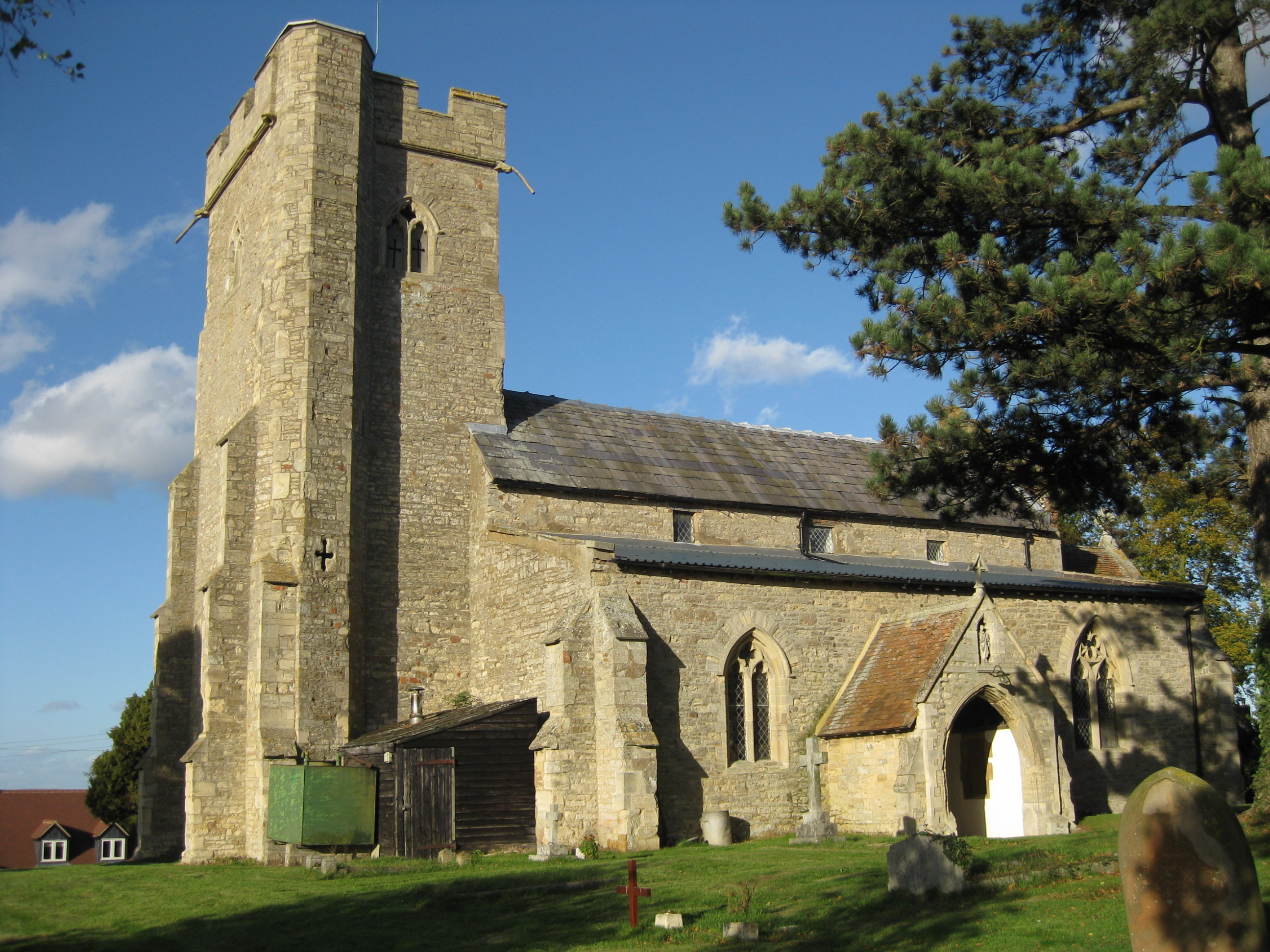
- The Parish Church - St Mary's of the Assumption

- Location within Buckinghamshire
- Interactive map of Moulsoe
- Population: 332 (2021 census)
- OS grid reference: SP910419
- Civil parish: Moulsoe
- District: City of Milton Keynes
- Unitary authority: Milton Keynes City Council
- Ceremonial county: Buckinghamshire
- Region: South East
- Country: England
- Sovereign state: United Kingdom
- Post town: NEWPORT PAGNELL
- Postcode district: MK16
- Dialling code: 01908
- Police: Thames Valley
- Fire: Buckinghamshire
- Ambulance: South Central
- UK Parliament: Milton Keynes North

Moulsoe is a village and civil parish in the unitary authority area of the City of Milton Keynes, Buckinghamshire, England. It is on the border with Bedfordshire, and just east of the M1, situated about 2.5 miles (4.0 km) ESE of Newport Pagnell, and about 5 miles (8.0 km) NNE of Central Milton Keynes. The main road through the village is the Newport Road coming from the west, changing to the Cranfield Road going east at a bend by the church.

The village name is an Old English language word which means 'Mul's hill spur'. In the Domesday Book of 1086 the village was recorded as Moleshou.

There are several old thatched dwellings. Other buildings are of brick apart from some concrete council houses to the west. The parish church dates from the 14th century and is a Grade I listed building. There is an inn, the Carrington Arms, and a village hall, the Millennium Hall.

== Caldecote ==
Caldecote (52.073°N 0.715°W) is a tiny hamlet off Willen Road at the northeast corner of the parish, notable because of it being mentioned in Domesday because it had two watermills.

== Milton Keynes East ==
Milton Keynes East (also MK East) is a substantial new development at the northern end of the parish, with strategic development approval for 5,000 houses and 105 hectares (260 acres) for employment.

== Gallery ==
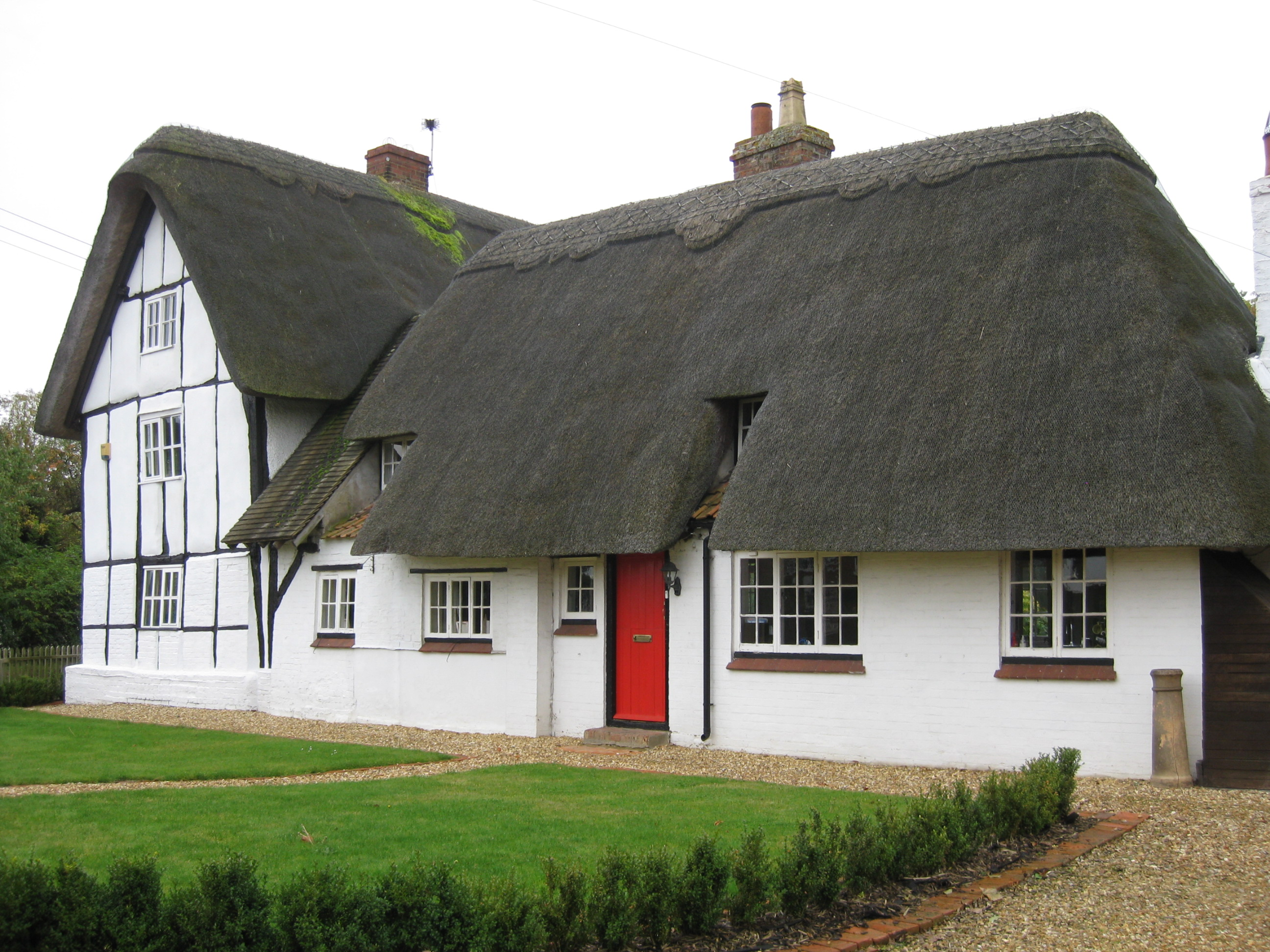
Yew Tree Cottage, Newport Road

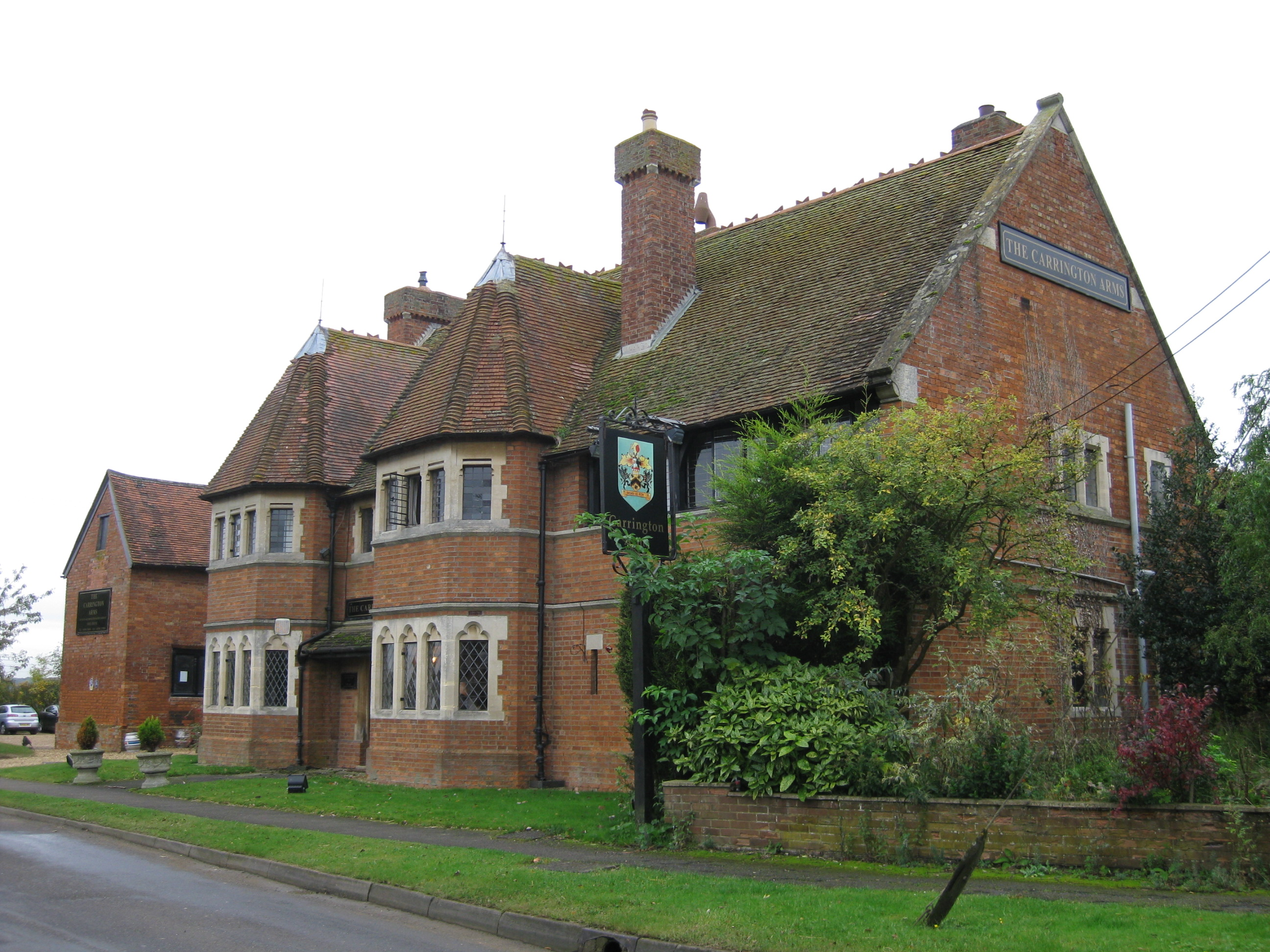
The Carrington Arms, Cranfield Road

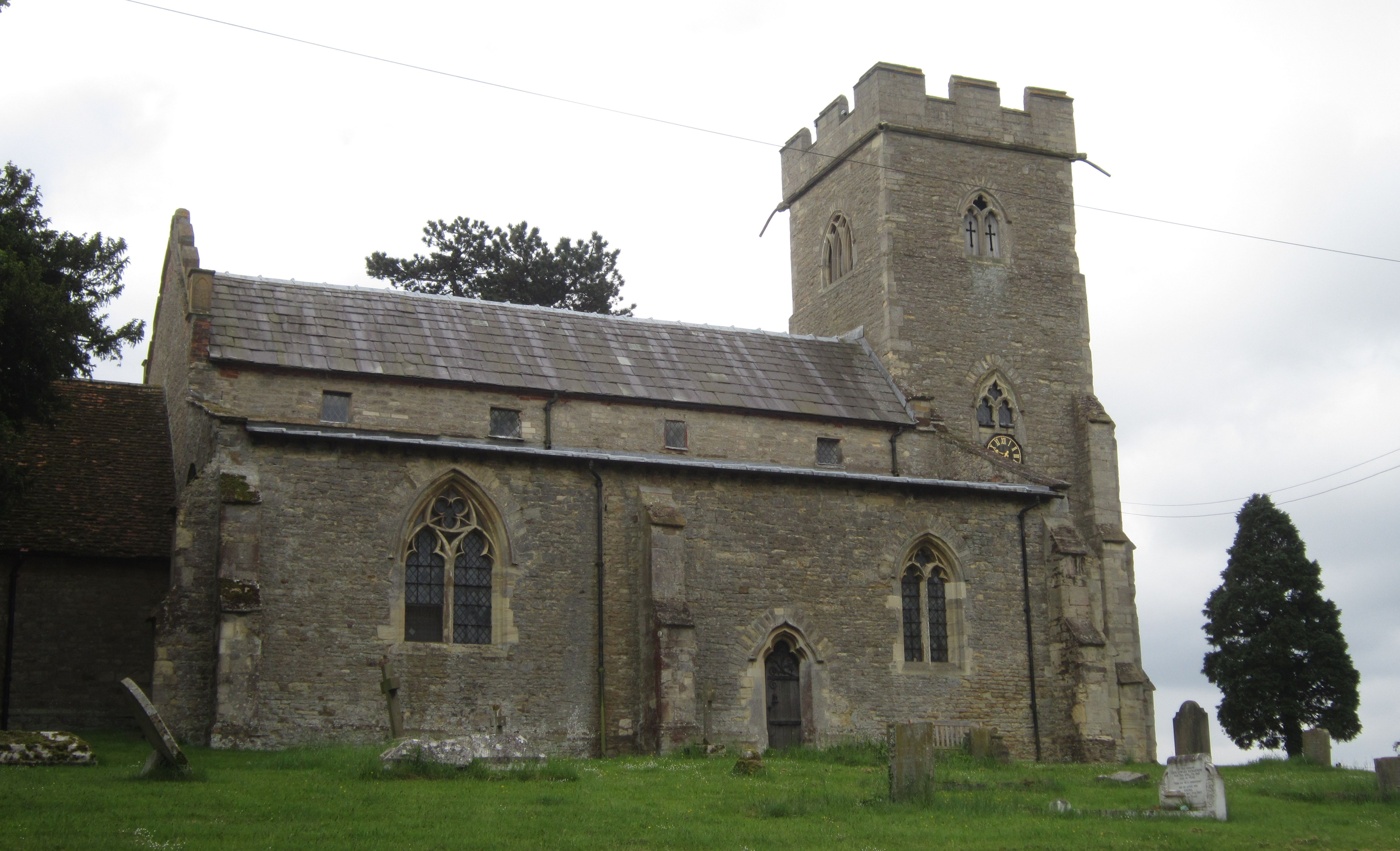
St Mary's church, view from Newport Road

== See also ==
- Adjacent parishes
  - Newport Pagnell
  - North Crawley
  - Cranfield (Bedfordshire)
  - Broughton and Milton Keynes
  - Great Linford
  - Hulcote and Salford (Bedfordshire)
