= Walton, Milton Keynes =

Civil parish in Milton Keynes, England

Coordinates: 52.0166°N 0.7002°W

Walton
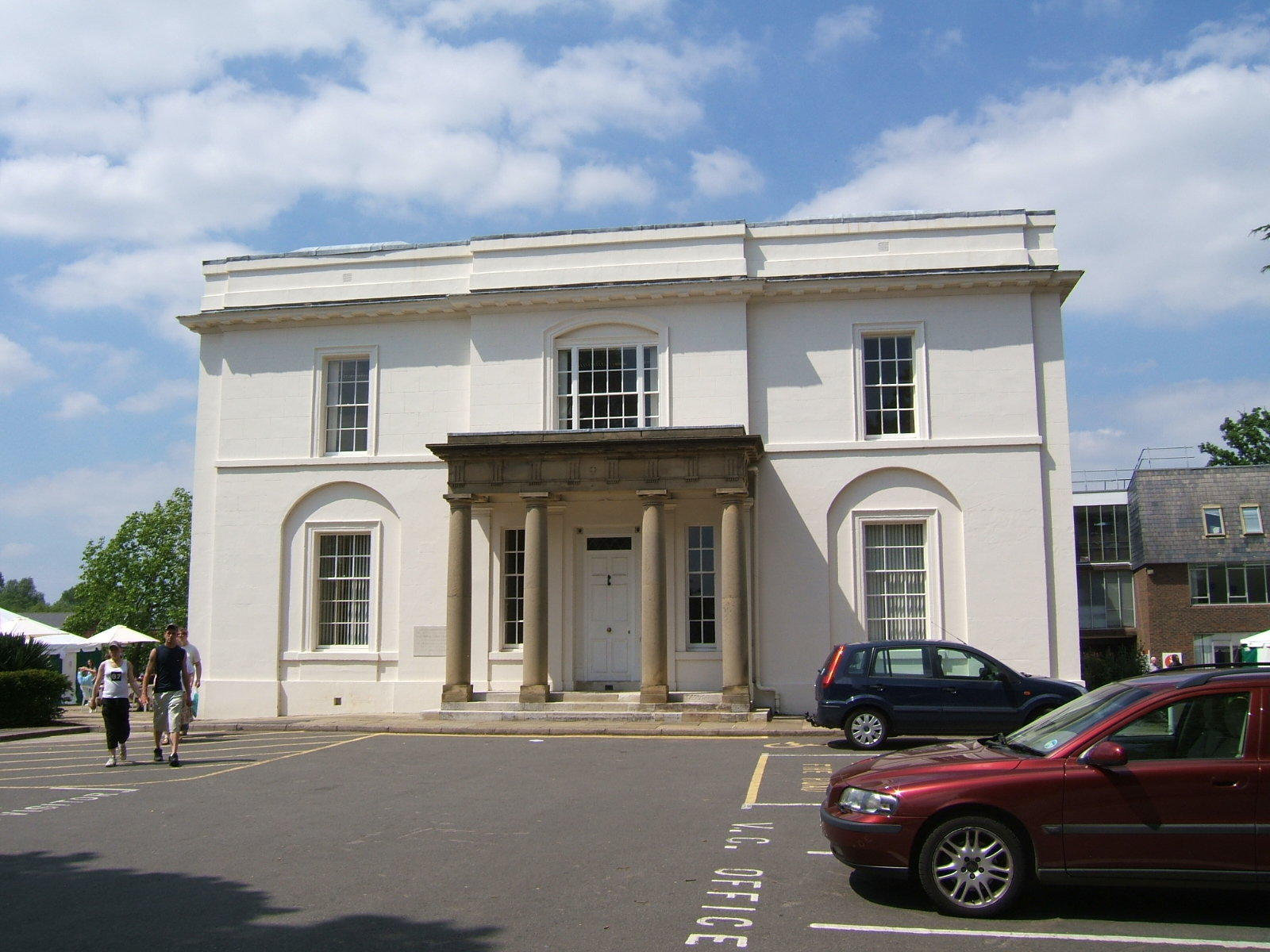
- Walton Hall, the former manor house of Walton

- Location within Buckinghamshire
- Interactive map of Walton
- Population: 12,100 (2021 Census)
- OS grid reference: SP854388
- Civil parish: Walton
- District: City of Milton Keynes
- Unitary authority: Milton Keynes City Council
- Ceremonial county: Buckinghamshire
- Region: South East
- Country: England
- Sovereign state: United Kingdom
- Post town: MILTON KEYNES
- Postcode district: MK7
- Dialling code: 01908
- Police: Thames Valley
- Fire: Buckinghamshire
- Ambulance: South Central
- UK Parliament: Milton Keynes Central

Walton is a district and civil parish in Milton Keynes, Buckinghamshire, England, located about four miles south of the city centre and just east of Simpson. For local government purposes, it is part of the 'Danesborough and Walton' electoral ward. At the 2021 census, the parish had a population of 12,100.

Walton was historically a hamlet, mostly along Walton Road in the modern Walnut Tree grid square. The modern H9 Groveway grid road severs a few of its houses into the Walton Hall grid square, and the V10 Brickhill Street separates the Manor Farm off into the Walton grid square. The Manor Farm has been redeveloped, first into a research centre for Hoechst and subsequently as the UK headquarters of MSD Animal Health.

The village name is a common one in England, and is an Old English language word, meaning 'forest farm or settlement'. The village is first recorded (in the 12th century) as Wauton.

Walton Hall, the manor house of the village, and its chapel of ease (now deconsecrated) are in the campus grounds of The Open University, in the Walton Hall district.

== Modern Walton ==
The modern Walton district is a light-industrial and residential district on the banks of the River Ouzel, a tributary of the Great Ouse and on the other side of Brickhill Street from the hamlet that gives it its name. It is largely the grounds of Walton Manor Farm. The other village farm, Walnut Tree Farm, still exists and the Walnut Tree district is on its lands.

== Walton Civil Parish ==
The civil parish of Walton includes the districts of Browns Wood, Caldecotte, Old Farm Park, Tilbrook, Towergate, Walton, Walton Hall, Walton Park, Walnut Tree and Wavendon Gate. Caldecotte Lake is one of the more significant geographic features, extending from Caldecotte and Walton Park. The parish council is entitled a 'community council".

Walton Community Council is the first tier of local government serving those living, attending and working in this area of Milton Keynes. The council is responsible for the estates and villages of Browns Wood, Caldecotte, Old Farm Park, Tilbrook, Tower Gate, Walnut Tree, Walton Hall, Walton Park and Wavendon Gate.

=== Browns Wood ===
Browns Wood is a district in the south-east corner of the civil parish which, in the 2001 Census, also gave its name to an Office for National Statistics designated 'urban sub-area'.

The sports ground at Browns Wood contains two football pitches, a pump track, children's play area, outdoor gym and a multi-use games area (MUGA) which is open access but can be hired from the Walton Community Council.

=== Caldecotte ===
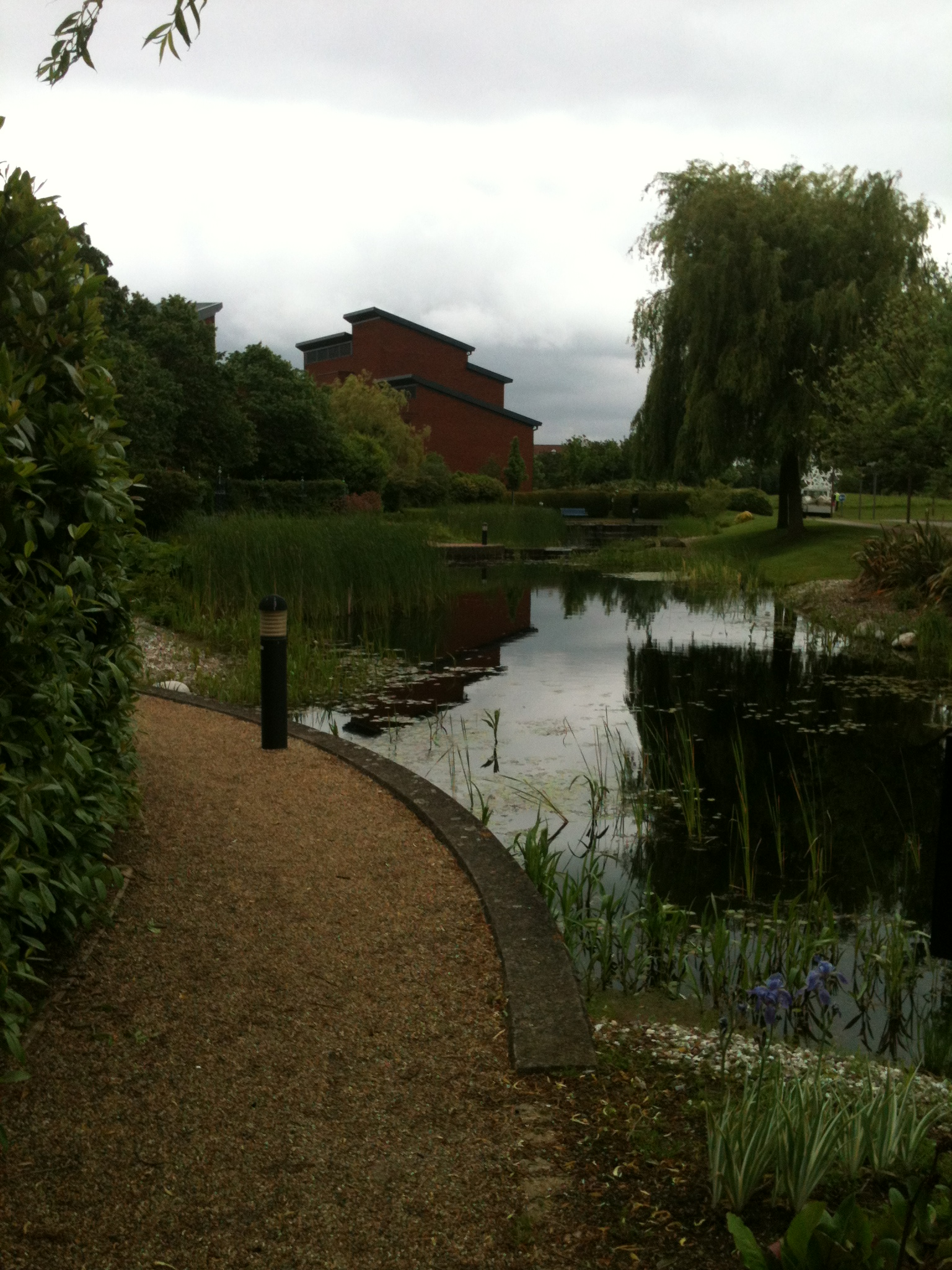
Caldecotte Lake Business Park

Caldecotte (pronounced Cold-e-cot) is another district in the parish, that includes the site of an ancient village of the same name. It is also includes the larger part of Caldecotte Lake, an important manmade balancing lake that manages flood water on the River Ouzel just as it enters Milton Keynes. The lake is used by a number of local clubs for rowing and other water sports. The most notable of the fossils uncovered when the site for the lake was being excavated was that of an ichthyosaur, now on display in the central library.

The place name is fairly common in England, and is Old English meaning "cold cottage". This refers to a resting place for travellers or other strangers on the road. The original Northampton to London road (modern Brickhill Street) runs nearby, just short of its junction with Watling Street (itself a major route in continuous use since Roman times). The village declined when the Northampton road was rerouted in 1728 through Broughton and Woburn to join the Watling Street at Hockliffe.

=== Old Farm Park ===
Old Farm Park is a residential area in the south-east of the parish.

=== Tilbrook ===
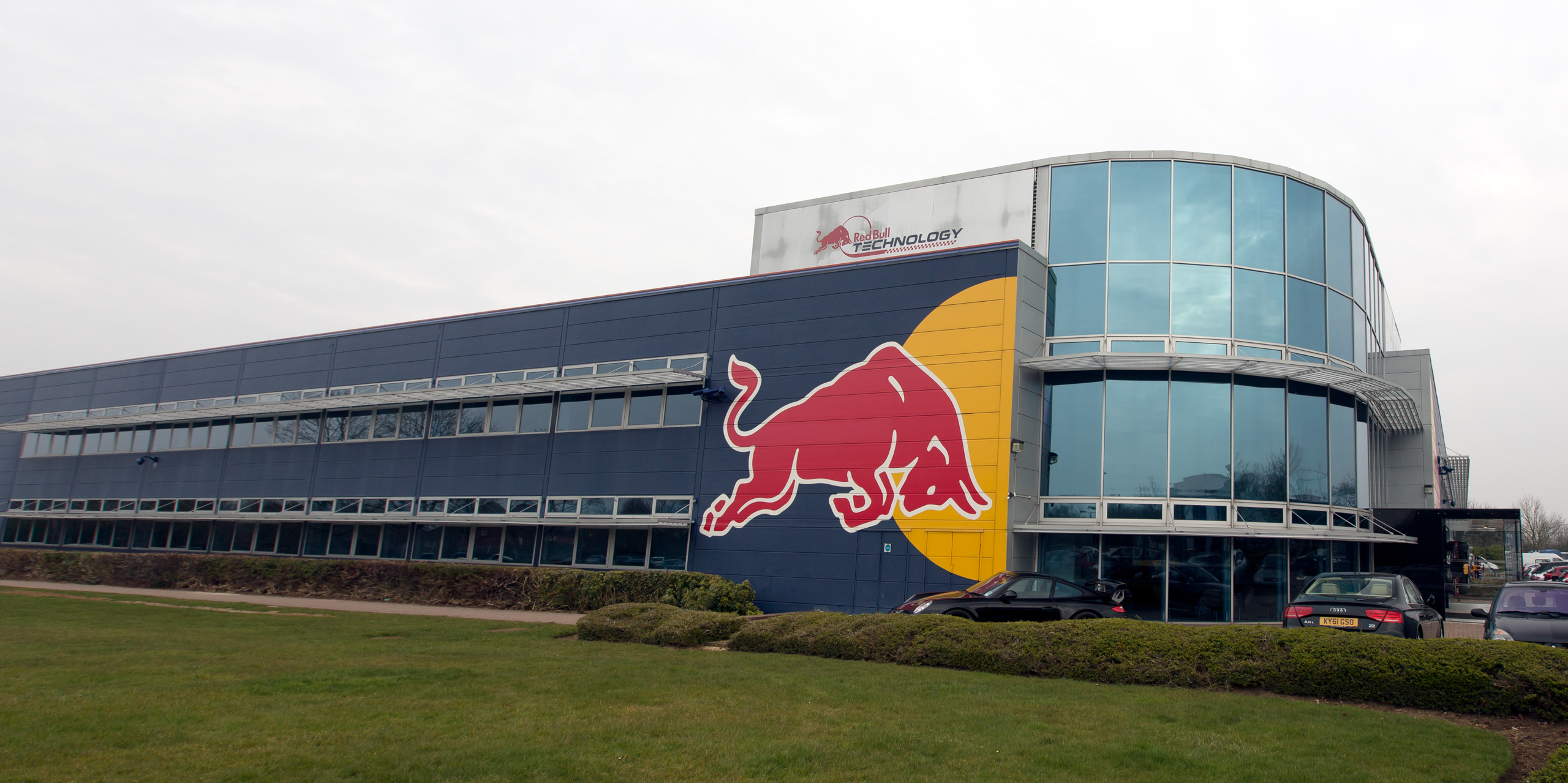
The Red Bull Technology factory in Tilbrook, home of Red Bull Racing since 2004

The industrial area of Tilbrook is noted for being the home of Red Bull Racing.

=== Walton (district) ===
Walton itself is to the north-west of the parish, contained by Groveway, Brickhill Street, Bletcham Way and the River Ouzel. Walton contains a research centre for Hoechst AG as well as housing.

=== Walton Hall ===
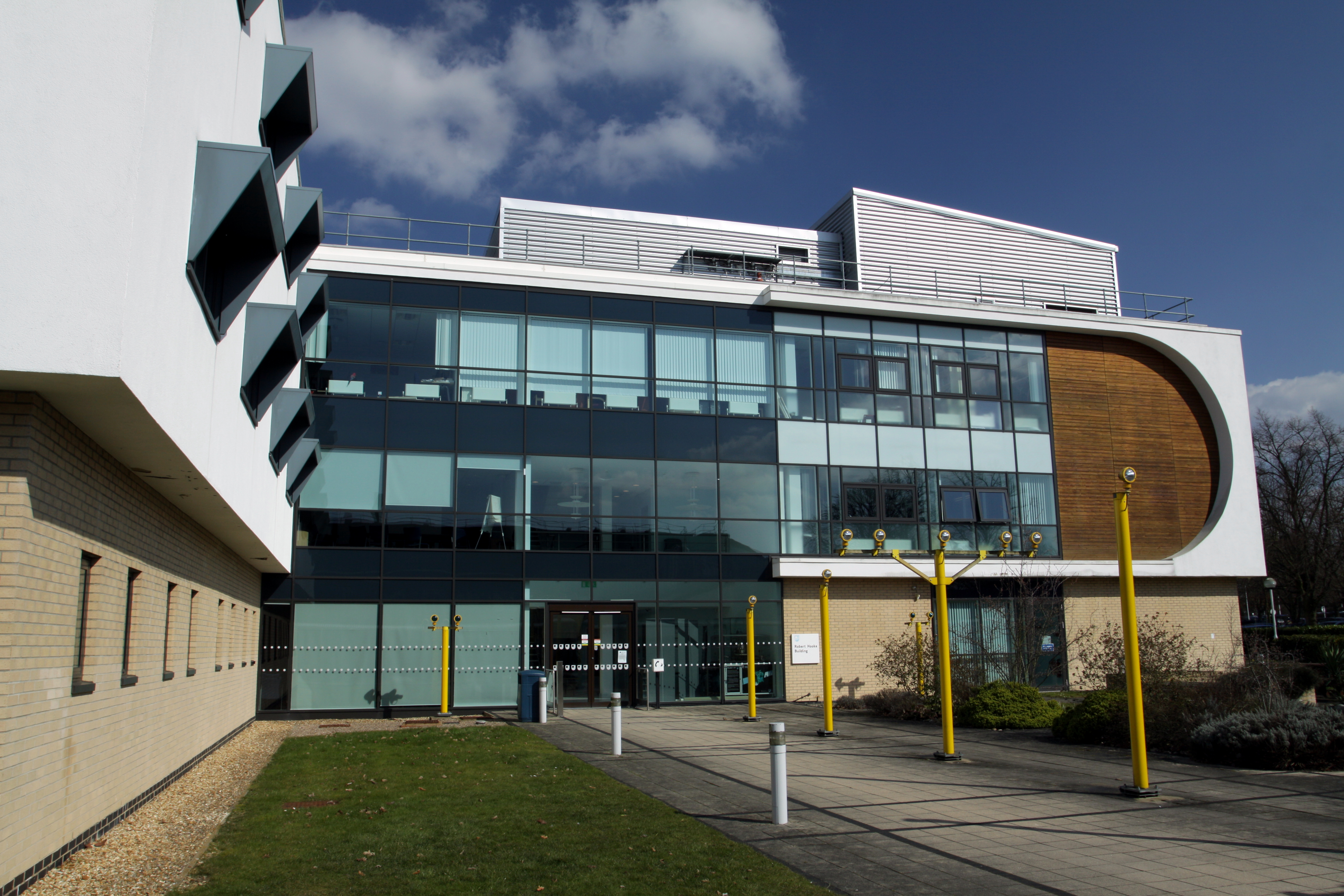
Robert Hooke building, located on the Open University campus

Walton Hall is in the northwest of the parish, and is the location of the campus and offices of The Open University. The university campus covers 45 hectares (110 acres). The district also includes a few private houses and an independent pre-school nursery.

In the university campus grounds are the manor house (Walton Hall), which gives the district its name, and the ancient chapel of ease of St Michael, now deconsecrated. The manor farm-lands are divided between Walton Hall, the modern Walton, Kents Hill and Walnut Tree.

The manor house itself, built in 1830 in the Regency style for the Pinfold family, is home to the vice-chancellor's offices of the Open University.

Walton Hall is on the banks of the Ouzel, a tributary of the Great Ouse where Walton Lake, a small balancing lake, has become naturalised and is home to reeds, bulrushes, reed warbler, reed bunting, water rail, sparrowhawk, kestrel, green woodpecker, grass snake and many varieties of odonata. Surrounding the reedbed are ponds and open water, ancient hedgerows and hay meadow.

=== Walnut Tree ===
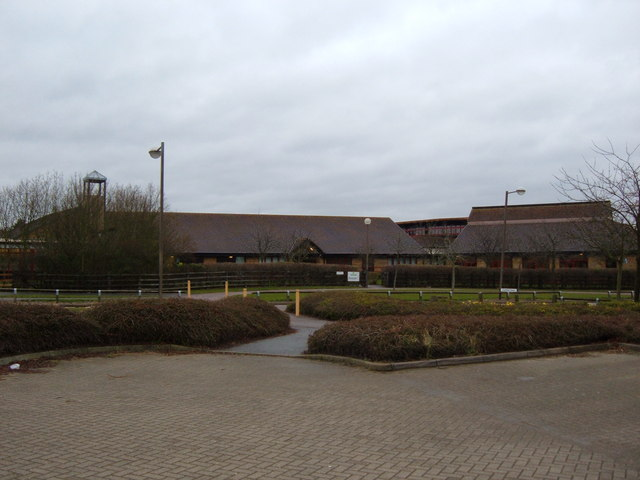
Heronsgate School, Walnut Tree

Walnut Tree is a residential district in Walton, with a population of 3,354 in the last UK census. It is named after the Walnut Tree Farm, on whose land the estate was built. All the street names in Walnut Tree are named after either wild flowers and herbs or 18th century turnpike trusts.

Walnut Tree is home to a local centre, including small shopping outlets and takeaway restaurants. The district also contains a GP surgery, a sports injury clinic, a pub and a pet supplies store.

The area features three schools, all operated by the Milton Keynes Education Trust (MKET) – Walton High for secondary education as well as the Heronshaw and Heronsgate schools for primary education, serving both Key Stage 1 and Key Stage 2 respectively.

There are a cricket ground and football pitch with changing facilities. A number of play parks for children are scattered throughout the area.

=== Wavendon Gate ===
Wavendon Gate is a district within the civil parish which borders the village of Wavendon. It is a mainly residential area which contains the Wavendon Gate junior school and also a cricket green and pavilion for recreational activities.

== ONS urban sub-areas ==
For the 2001 Census, the Office for National Statistics designated urban sub-areas called Walnut Tree and Browns Wood that are far bigger than the districts of that name. The Walnut Tree and Browns Wood urban sub-areas together approximated to that part of the former Newport Pagnell Rural District that is west of the River Ouzel and east of the M1. The ONS discontinued this usage in the 2011 Census.

== See also ==
- Caldecote, Moulsoe
- Walton (disambiguation) – other places and people named Walton
