= Campbell Park (civil parish) =

Civil parish in Buckinghamshire, England

Coordinates: 52.03867°N 0.73924°W

- The Barge Inn, Woolstone

- Location within Buckinghamshire
- Interactive map of Campbell Park
- Population: 15,817 (2021 census)
- OS grid reference: SP865385
- Civil parish: Campbell Park
- District: City of Milton Keynes
- Unitary authority: Milton Keynes City Council
- Ceremonial county: Buckinghamshire
- Region: South East
- Country: England
- Sovereign state: United Kingdom
- Post town: MILTON KEYNES
- Postcode district: MK6
- Dialling code: 01908
- Police: Thames Valley
- Fire: Buckinghamshire
- Ambulance: South Central
- UK Parliament: Milton Keynes Central
- Website: www.campbell-park.gov.uk

Campbell Park is a civil parish in Milton Keynes, Buckinghamshire, England. The parish is bounded by Childs Way (H6) to the north, the River Ouzel to the east, the A5 to the west, and Chaffron Way to the south. The parish includes the § Fishermead, § Newlands, § Oldbrook, § Springfield, § Winterhill, Willen and The Woolstones grid-squares. The parish was originally known as Woolstone-cum-Willen, and was formed on 1 April 1934 as a merger of Great Woolstone, Little Woolstone and Willen. The parish was part of Newport Pagnell Rural District until the latter became part of the Borough of Milton Keynes in 1974. The parish was redefined in 2012, when the Campbell Park [sic] grid-square was reallocated to Central Milton Keynes CP. Despite the loss of its eponymous district, the Parish Council continues to use its name. As of December 2022, the parish council was consulting on changing its name (to "Secklow Community Council").

== Fishermead ==
Fishermead is named after a field called Fishers Mead. The fishing theme is continued in the street naming. All of the streets are named after Cornish fishing villages. There are two schools in the area, The Willows (formerly Newlyn Place) first school and Jubilee Wood School (formed by the amalgamation of Penwith first school and Meadfurlong middle school in 2012). Fishermead is known for its many trees and parks, with several local shops including a Co-op.

The townscape in Fishermead is characterised by rectangular blocks of 100–150 metres in length, backing onto shared "garden squares".

== Newlands ==
Newlands is primarily a leisure and recreational area just east of Campbell Park, between the Grand Union Canal and Brickhill Street (which separates it from Willen Lake). Its more significant elements are Gulliver's Land (a small theme park for younger children) and the Tree Cathedral, in which trees echo the layout of Norwich Cathedral.

== Oldbrook ==
Oldbrook is separated from Central Milton Keynes by Child's Way (H6). Despite its proximity to the central business district of Milton Keynes, it has its own local centre comprising various shops and restaurants. Oldbrook is also home to Milton Keynes Christian Centre which is one of the larger churches in Milton Keynes. There is one school in Oldbrook, Oldbrook First School on Oldbrook Blvd.

All of the streets are named following a cricketing theme, most after English cricketers.

== Springfield ==
Springfield is a residential area situated close to Central Milton Keynes. It sits between the districts of Fishermead, Peartree Bridge and the Woolstones. The Grand Union Canal runs by Springfield into nearby Peartree Bridge.

There are two schools in the area, Orchard and Shepherdswell Academy (Formerly Orchard School and Shepherdswell First School). Both schools are now run by EMAT (East Midlands Academy Trust). Orchard is an ever growing school, becoming a three form entry school in September 2015. The council granted permission in July 2017 for the school to expand, creating an additional 8 classrooms and a new small hall.

== Willen ==
Willen is in the northeast of the parish: the village is separated from the rest of the parish by Willen Lake (which takes up most of its two grid squares). The other notable features of the district include the church of St Mary Magdalene (1680), the Milton Keynes Peace Pagoda (1980) and its associated Buddhist temple, and the Willen Hospice.

== The Woolstones ==
Great Woolstone and Little Woolstone are two historic villages in modern Milton Keynes, ceremonial Buckinghamshire, called jointly 'Woolstone' or 'The Woolstones', that form the heart of a new district of that name.

== Winterhill ==
Winterhill is the most westerly district of the parish, butting up as it does to the West Coast Main Line, a little to the south of Milton Keynes Central railway station. It is a small district, split from the rest (Knowlhill) of its natural grid square by the railway line and the A5. It consists primarily of 'big shed' retail outlets and campus style offices.
