= Calverton, Buckinghamshire =

Civil parish in the Borough of Milton Keynes, England

Coordinates: 52.0414°N 0.8500°W

Calverton
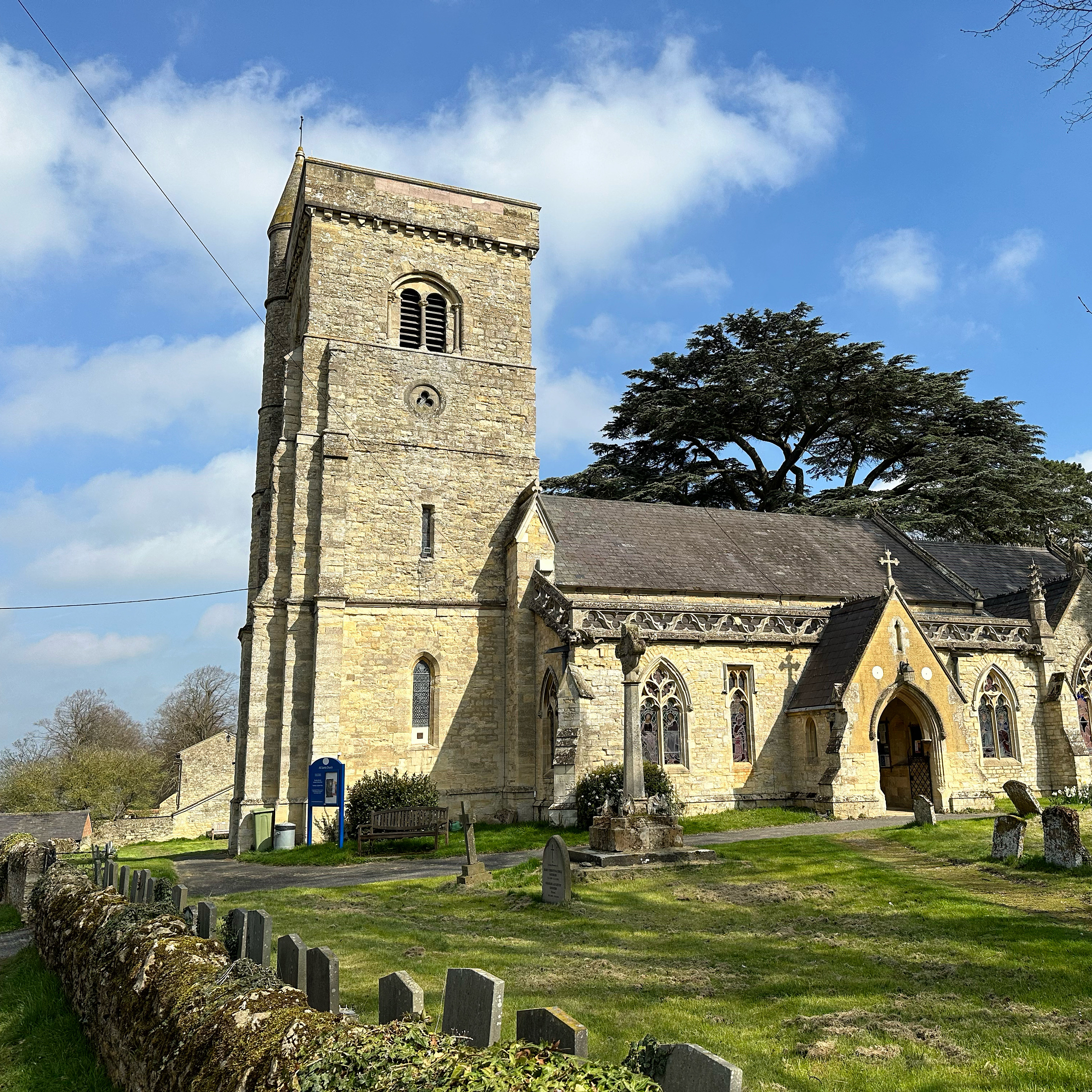
- All Saints Church, Calverton

- Location within Buckinghamshire
- Interactive map of Calverton
- Population: 170 (2021 census)
- OS grid reference: SP788387
- Civil parish: Calverton
- District: City of Milton Keynes
- Unitary authority: Milton Keynes City Council
- Ceremonial county: Buckinghamshire
- Region: South East
- Country: England
- Sovereign state: United Kingdom
- Post town: MILTON KEYNES
- Postcode district: MK19
- Dialling code: 01908
- Police: Thames Valley
- Fire: Buckinghamshire
- Ambulance: South Central
- UK Parliament: Milton Keynes North

Calverton is a civil parish in the unitary authority area of the City of Milton Keynes, Buckinghamshire, England and just outside the Milton Keynes urban area, situated roughly 1 mile (1.6 km) south of Stony Stratford, and 4 miles (6.4 km) west of Central Milton Keynes. The parish consists of one village, Lower Weald, and two hamlets, Upper Weald and Middle Weald. Lower Weald is the largest of the three settlements, and Manor Farm, the parish church and the former parochial school are within its boundaries.

The settlement name is Old English, and means 'farm where calves are reared'. In the Domesday Book of 1086 the village was recorded as Calvretone.

The west side of nearby Stony Stratford was once included with the ecclesiastic parish of Calverton (the east side being in Wolverton). "The manorial rights over the west side were held with those of Calverton, [which] led to the manor of Calverton being often called 'the manor of Calverton with Stony Stratford', and the fair and market of Stony Stratford were included among its appurtenances, until an Act of Parliament in the 18th century separated them.

The parish of Calverton was part of Stratford and Wolverton Rural District from 1894 to 1919, when the rural district became an urban district, subsequently renamed Wolverton urban district in 1920. The area was re-established as a separate parish in 2001.

The parish church is dedicated to All Saints. "It was rebuilt in stone in the 12th- and 14th-century styles between 1818 and 1824, when some of the old details were re-used".

== Lower Weald ==
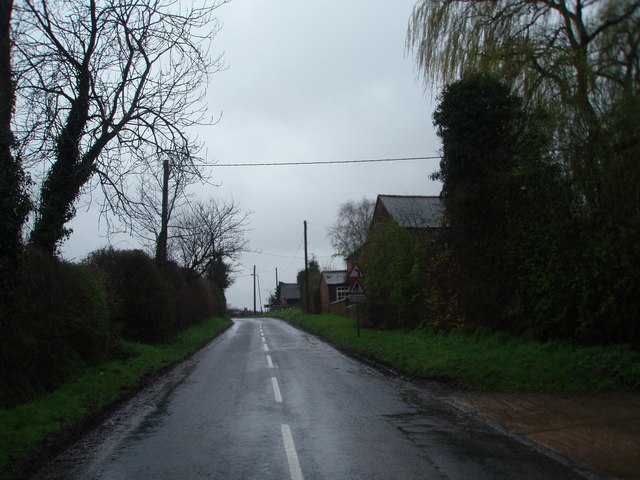
Approaching Upper Weald from the north

Lower Weald is the location of the parish church and Calverton Manor; the hamlets are located to the south east of the village centre, on the road to Whaddon.

The manor was acquired in 1616 by Sir Thomas Bennett, who had been Lord Mayor of London in 1603. The house was extended in 1659 by his grandson Sir Simon Bennett. The manor house is reputedly haunted by the ghost of Simon's wife, Lady Grace Bennett, who was murdered there in 1694. The Bennett family also owned the neighbouring manor of Beachampton. The titles of the Lord de Calverton and Lord de Beachampton, but not the formerly-associated lands of these two manors, remain in the Bennett family to the present day. On 2 August 2011, Calverton Manor house featured in BBC2's Restoration Home television series.

== Middle Weald ==
Middle Weald is a hamlet of about ten dwellings, about half a mile (1 km) from the parish church.

== Upper Weald ==
Upper Weald is a hamlet of about twenty dwellings, a little over a mile (about 2 km) from the parish church. The hamlet includes the farmhouse of Fairfield Farm, which gives its name to the modern neighbourhood and civil parish, Fairfields, being developed on part of its former lands adjacent to Watling Street.

== Listed buildings and structures ==
The parish has two grade II* listed buildings (Calverton Manor farm house and the parish church), and a further 24 buildings and structures with grade II listings.
