= Furzton =

Area of Milton Keynes in Buckinghamshire, England

Coordinates: 52.010°N 0.770°W

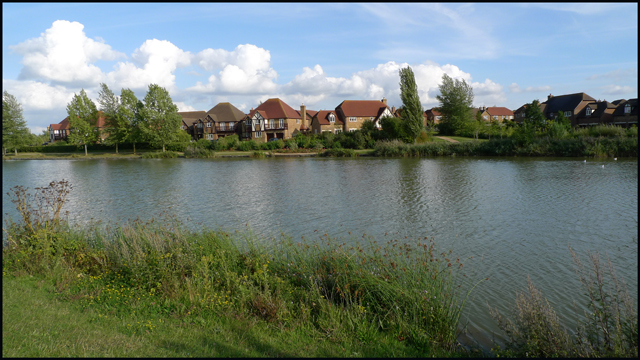
- Furzton Lake, Milton Keynes

- Location within Buckinghamshire
- Interactive map of Furzton
- OS grid reference: SP845353
- Civil parish: Shenley Brook End
- Unitary authority: City of Milton Keynes
- Ceremonial county: Buckinghamshire
- Region: South East
- Country: England
- Sovereign state: United Kingdom
- Post town: MILTON KEYNES
- Postcode district: MK4
- Dialling code: 01908
- Police: Thames Valley
- Fire: Buckinghamshire
- Ambulance: South Central
- UK Parliament: Milton Keynes North

Furzton is a district in south-west Milton Keynes, Buckinghamshire, England and in the civil parish of Shenley Brook End The man-made Furzton Lake is a balancing lake that covers approximately half of the district. The district lies just north of Bletchley, and roughly 2 miles (3.2 km) south of Central Milton Keynes.

== History ==
The housing in South Furzton was built sometime around the early to mid-1980s, with the Parkside/Favell Drive housing to the East coming first – development then moved West along Blackmoor Gate. The shops were constructed after 1984 – prior to this time, the nearest local shops were at Melrose Avenue, in Bletchley.

Prior to the construction of North Furzton, the land on the northern side of the brook in the linear park was farmland – thus, residents of South Furzton had only a short walk to reach open countryside. When plans were announced for North Furzton, in particular the extension of Dulverton Drive to form the link between the two sides, residents' meetings were held in protest at what residents expected would be a significant increase in traffic. Most of the South Furzton housing was complete when the construction of the lake started.

North Furzton housing and shops were built between 1990 and 2004.

== Furzton Lake ==
View of Furzton lake. Video.

Because of its clay soils and relatively flat topography, the designers of Milton Keynes had to make provision for flood control. A key element of this strategy is to restrain floodwater from reaching the River Great Ouse lest it create problems for downstream settlements, using balancing lakes and managed flood plains. Loughton Brook, which rises in Whaddon (just beyond Tattenhoe) and joins the Ouse at New Bradwell, is usually a very minor tributary, little more than a metre wide here. It has quite a large catchment area, added to by the hard surfaces of the surrounding developments. Built in the 1980s, and with an area of 70 acres (28 hectares), Furzton Lake is the first major balancing lake it encounters. The flood plain of the brook forms a linear park about 200 metres wide that runs through the district west to east. The lake and its surroundings provide an important local leisure facility.

== Church of the Servant King ==
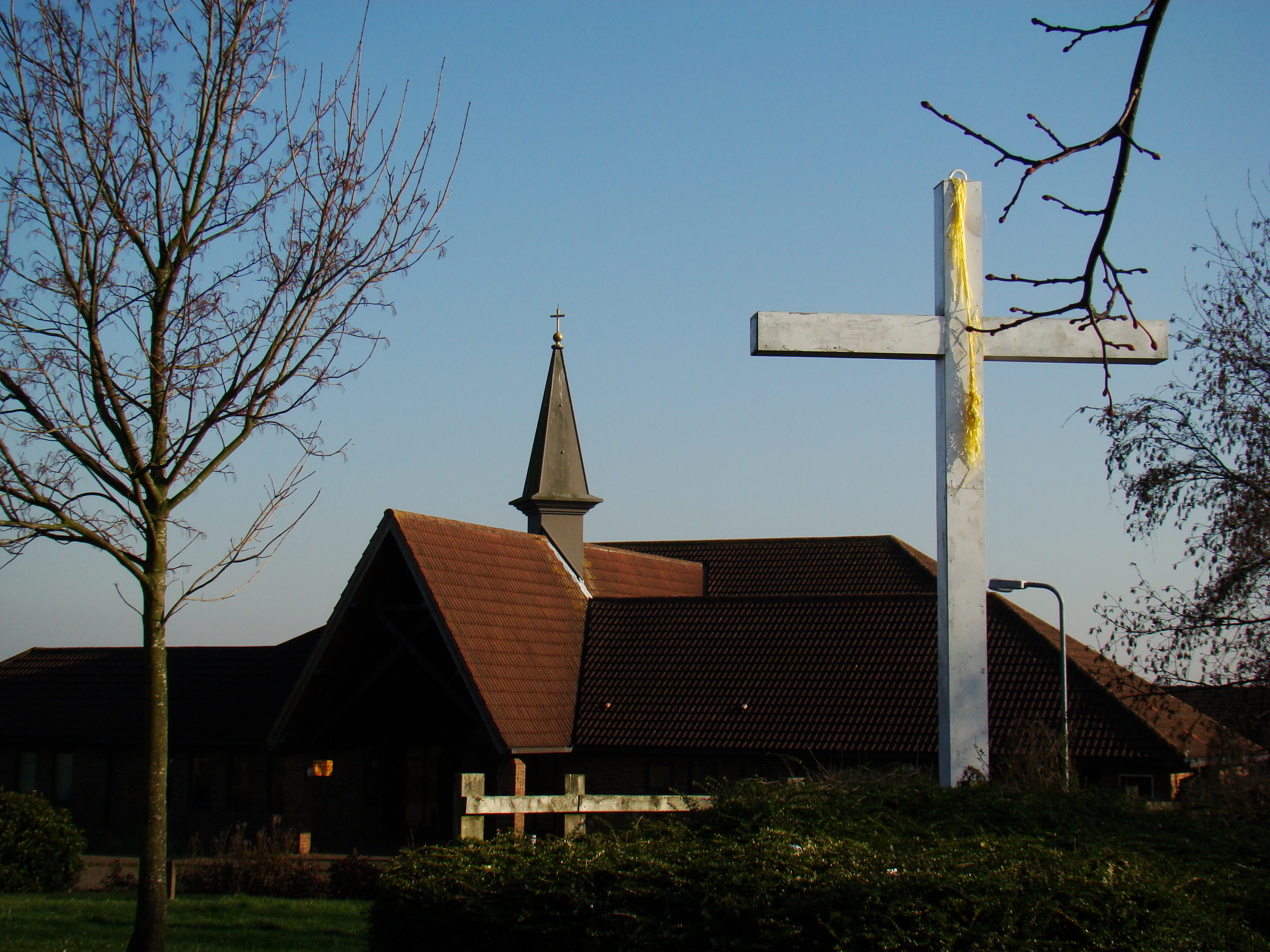
Church of the Servant King, Furzton

The Church of the Servant King, Furzton is an ecumenical church located in Furzton. The church forms part of the Watling Valley Ecumenical Partnership. The congregation of the church started meeting in a community house in the local area, led by a Church Army sister. As numbers grew, they moved first to the Meeting Place in South Furzton, then to Coldharbour School. The present church building was used from June 1992 onwards, with the official opening in September 1992. The building, on Dulverton Drive, is shared with the Ridgeway Community Centre.
