= Walton High School, Milton Keynes =

Walton High

Location
- Fyfield Barrow; Walnut Tree; Milton Keynes, Buckinghamshire, MK7 7WH; England; 52.0206°N 0.6892°W

Information
- Type: Academy
- Motto: Enabling, Enhancing, Enriching
- Established: 1999; 27 years ago
- Department for Education URN: 136842 Tables
- Ofsted: Reports
- Chair of Governors: Renu Elston
- Executive Principal: Michelle Currie
- Gender: Coeducational
- Age: 11 to 19
- Enrolment: 1,923 (as of 2018 Ofsted inspection)
- Campuses: Walnut Tree, Brooklands
- Houses: Air, Earth, Fire and Water
- Colours: Burgundy and Gold
- Publication: Walton Highlights
- Website: waltonhigh.org.uk

Walton High is a large academy school with two campuses located in the Walnut Tree and Brooklands areas of eastern Milton Keynes in Buckinghamshire, England. Walton High’s sixth form centre, Post-16, is one of the more successful in the area on some measures, attracting pupils from across Milton Keynes.

As of January 2018 there were 1,923 pupils. By 2022, Walton High is expected to grow to be one of the largest schools in the country with 3,000 pupils across both campuses.

The school has consistently good Ofsted reports: in 2018 it was rated "Good".

The school was previously a specialist Business and Enterprise College and had foundation status. Walton High converted to academy status on 1 July 2011, becoming the founding member of the Milton Keynes Education Trust (MKET) – the first multi-academy trust established in Milton Keynes.

== Walnut Tree Campus ==
Walton High’s Walnut Tree campus was opened on 1 September 1999. Founding Principal was Roy Blatchford. 120 pupils enrolled in the first intake. Since then, the Walnut Tree campus has grown considerably. In September 2000, a new Art and Design Technology block was added to the site. It contains, among other facilities, art rooms, workshops, food technology rooms, and a specialised textiles room. In September 2004, a temporary Sixth Form area, new Café and a new sports hall were added to the campus along with approximately twenty new classrooms and a new library area. In late 2006, plans for a new "state of the art" sixth form area to replace the temporary one, and a sports pavilion/dance studio (including a bar) were approved to be added onto the adjoining grass land. Now complete, the sports pavilion is at the head of a series of 12 astroturf pitches, operated under the Powerleague franchise. The pavilion houses changing rooms, a dance studio and a bar.

=== Post-16 Centre ===
In September 2007, the Post-16 Centre opened, providing a base for approximately 400 students pursuing a variety of academic and vocational courses. The building hosts a quiet study area with computers, IT facilities, desks and individual study carrels, all for exclusive use of sixth form students, as well as the school's Modern Foreign Languages classrooms.

=== The Venue ===
The Venue is a professional-standard theatre with 380 seats, backstage and front of house facilities, including a bar. Technically, the theatre is equipped with “a 12m x 9m stage, fly tower, orchestra pit, Green Room, state-of-the-art sound system and lighting rig”. Completed in May 2011, The Venue opened with a showing of Walton High’s student production of Hairspray. The Venue is utilised for school productions, as well as professional touring productions and those of Performing Arts Schools in the region, as well as housing the school’s English and Performing Arts departments.

=== Catering Facilities ===
There are three outlets serving food on the Walnut Tree Campus: the lower- and upper-cafés, and the snack van. These serve full meals, ‘lighter’ meals (e.g. sandwiches, panini, salads), and snack foods respectively. Over the summer, and Autumn Term 2011, a new mezzanine floor was added to the café area; thus significantly increasing available space, creating the upper-café.

== Brooklands Campus ==
Walton High’s £25m Brooklands Campus opened on 31 October 2016 to an initial cohort of pupils in years 7-9. Sports facilities include playing fields, cricket nets, a floodlit multi-use games area, artificial turf pitch, indoor sports hall and climbing walls. A minibus service transports pupils between campuses as required.

== House structure ==
The pupils at the school are divided into a system of four houses, representing the Classical Elements: Air, Earth, Fire and Water. These teams compete against each other every year on Sports Day, and are also used to divide the pupils at the school into smaller-sized tutor groups.

== Global partnerships ==
The school has strong global links with: Jamasi Methodist Junior High School in Ghana, Akrofonso D/A Junior High School, also in Ghana, as well as M. C. Kejriwal Vidyapeeth, in Kolkata, India.

== Academic performance ==
Walton High is one of Milton Keynes’ more successful schools in terms of academic performance. In the year 2018/19, Walton High was ranked in the top 2% of schools nationally and the top in Milton Keynes for academic progress from 16-18. Achievement to Key Stage 4, and to A-level were about average.

== Services ==
Both campus libraries are open from 08:00-16:00 for students and are stocked with a range of fiction and non-fiction texts, newspapers, magazines and periodicals, and a reference section of all core textbooks. All core text books are also available for loan. Walton High operates a cashless catering system, and since the academic year beginning 2018 catering services have been provided by Cucina, offering theme days and take-home meals.
