= Oakgrove School =

Academy in Milton Keynes, England

Location
- Venturer Gate; Milton Keynes, Buckinghamshire, MK10 9JQ; England; 52.0385°N 0.7090°W

Information
- Type: Academy
- Motto: Excellence, Innovation, Respect
- Established: 2005
- Specialist: Humanities College
- Department for Education URN: 136454 Tables
- Ofsted: Reports
- Headteacher: Nicola Irwin-Morris (secondary), Heather Loake (primary and nursery)
- Years taught: Nursery to Year 13
- Gender: Coeducational
- Age: 3 to 19
- Average class size: 25
- Hours in school day: 6 hours, 30 minuets
- Houses: Columba, Draco, Noctua, Pegasus, Phoenix
- Website: https://www.oakgrove.school/

Oakgrove School is a coeducational, nursery, primary school, secondary school and sixth form with academy status, located in the Middleton (Oakgrove Secondary) and Oakgrove (Oakgrove Primary & Nursery) districts of south-east Milton Keynes, England. It is the flagship school of the Kingsbridge Educational Trust.

The school originally opened on 1 September 2005, intaking roughly 60 students of both Year 7 and Year 8. In September 2016 the school expanded further to include a primary and nursery school section, for children aged 4 to 11.

== Oakgrove Primary & Nursery ==
The Primary & Nursery section of Oakgrove School was introduced along with the development of the Oakgrove district. The current headteacher is Heather Loake.

== Oakgrove Secondary ==
Oakgrove Secondary (originally opened as Oakgrove School) was founded in 2005. From 2005 to 2015 (2014–2015 academic year) the headteacher was Peter Barnes (current executive headteacher of Kingsbridge Educational Trust); however, from 2015 to 2026, Ian Tett took over.

The current headteacher is Nicola Irwin-Morris as of September 2026.

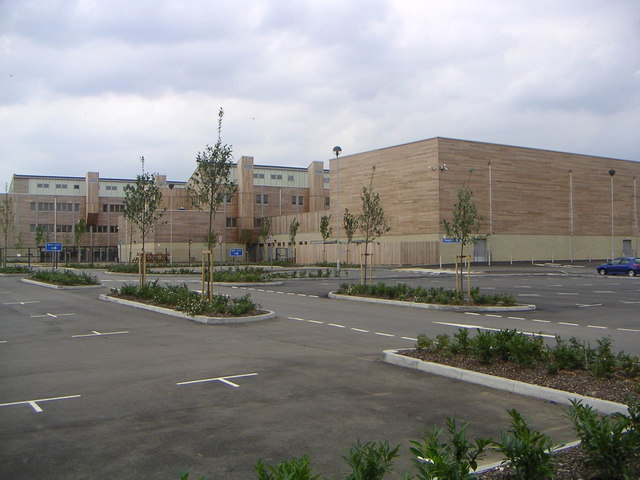
Oakgrove Secondary School

== Ofsted inspection results ==
Oakgrove School has undergone 4 full inspections conducted by Ofsted. Gradings have varied from outstanding to good. The latest full inspection was conducted on 26–27 June 2019.

Date of inspection	Overall effectiveness	Headteacher
13–14 September 2006	Good	Peter Barnes
10–11 June 2010	Outstanding	Peter Barnes
8–9 May 2013	Outstanding	Peter Barnes
26–27 June 2019	Good	Ian Tett

== Notable former pupils ==
- Jeffrey Schlupp, a professional footballer who won the league with Leicester City in 2016, as of 2026 most recently played for Norwich City.
- Max Crocombe, professional footballer who is a goalkeeper for Milwall F.C and the New Zealand national football team.
