= Broughton, Milton Keynes =

Area of Milton Keynes, England

Coordinates: 52.050°N 0.694°W

Broughton
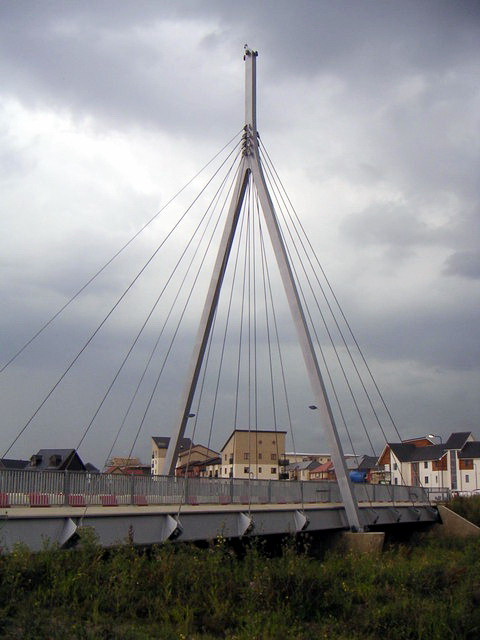
- Bridge in Broughton

- Location within Buckinghamshire
- Interactive map of Broughton
- Population: 2,493 (2011 Census)
- OS grid reference: SP895399
- Civil parish: Broughton and Milton Keynes
- District: City of Milton Keynes
- Unitary authority: Milton Keynes City Council
- Ceremonial county: Buckinghamshire
- Region: South East
- Country: England
- Sovereign state: United Kingdom
- Post town: MILTON KEYNES
- Postcode district: MK10
- Dialling code: 01908
- Police: Thames Valley
- Fire: Buckinghamshire
- Ambulance: South Central
- UK Parliament: Milton Keynes North

Broughton (/ˈbrɔːtən/, BRAW-tən) is a historic village, and modern district in Milton Keynes, Buckinghamshire, England, approximately 3 miles (4.8 km) east of Central Milton Keynes. Historically a civil parish in its own right, it is now part of the Broughton and Milton Keynes civil parish. Broughton district was developed during the 2000s and 2010s largely to the south and east of the historic village.

== History and location ==
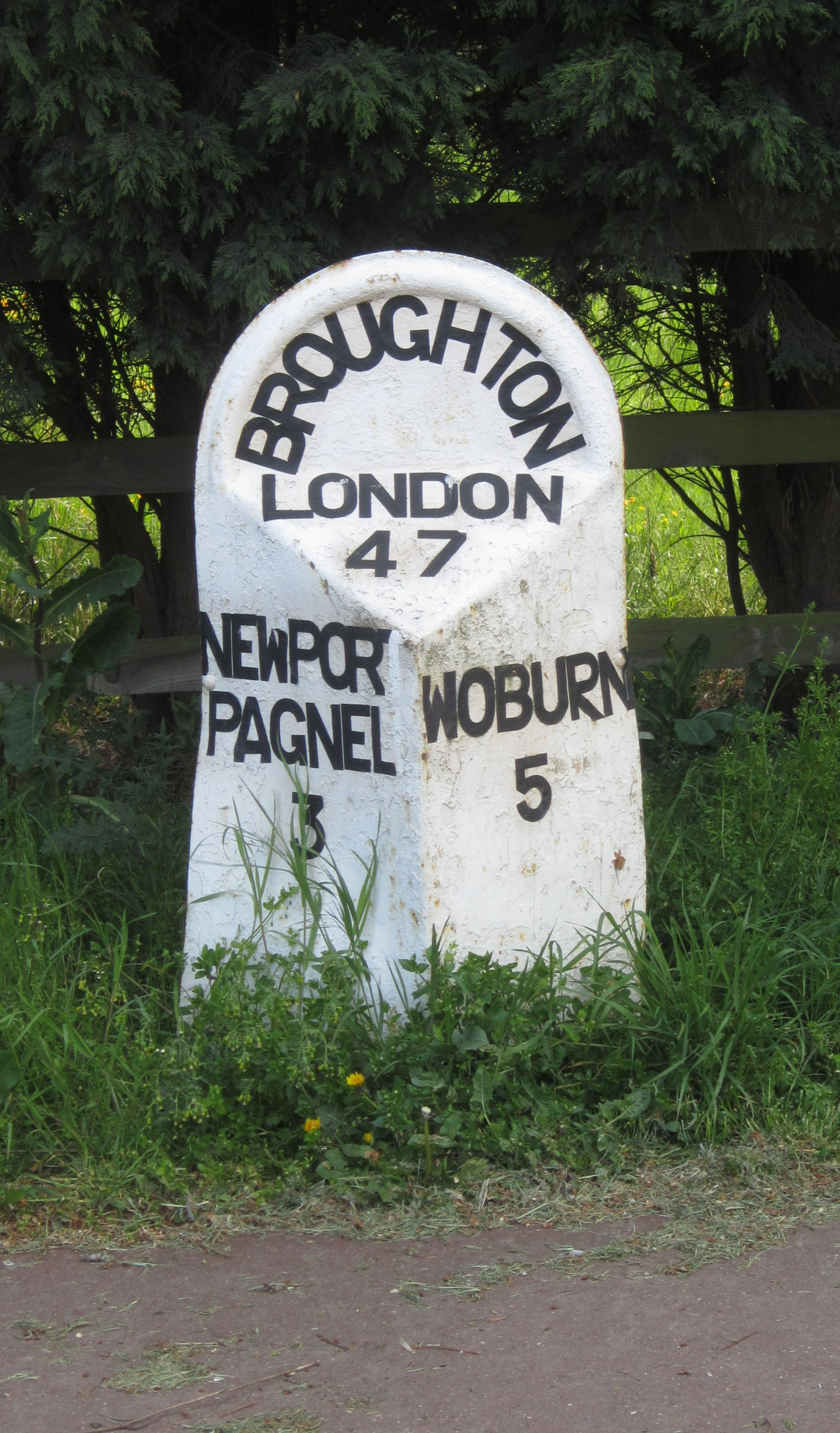
Broughton milestone on the original Northampton–London road

The name is Old English and meant 'brook farm'. In the Domesday Book, it is listed as owned by a Walter Giffard and the tenant was a Hugh de Bolbec. In the 6th century, its name was spelt Brotone.

The Northampton to London turnpike came through the village and joined Watling Street, now the A5 road, at Hockcliffe. The A50, London Road, the original route through the centre of the old village was bypassed in the early 1970s. The new road, comprising Fen Street and part of Newport Road was numbered A5130, but is now declassified. The bypass was the former eastern boundary of the built up area.

Over a 14 month period in 1958–9, 200,000 tons of gravel were dug from a 14-acre (5.7 ha) field at Manor Farm, Broughton for the construction of the M1 motorway, by a Newport Pagnell business under contract to John Laing and Sons. The field was then made good for agriculture.

The Milton Keynes grid road, Child's Way (H6), forms the district's northern boundary, Chaffron Way (H7) the southern, Tongwell Street (V11) its western, and the M1 motorway its eastern (accessible from Junction 14, roughly 1 mile (1.6 km) to the north, via the A509).

The district can be split into at least three areas. The original Broughton village forms part of a conservation area at the northern end, bounded by the brook and Newport Road. Atterbury is an area of new build housing, predominantly between the western side of the brook and Tongwell Street (V11). Broughton Gate and Brooklands, are part of the 'Milton Keynes Eastern Expansion area' east of the brook. A small cable-stayed bridge is one of two main road crossings across Broughton Brook, the third and newest is the extension of H7 Chaffron Way (as 'Countess Way') between Brooklands and Kingston.

== Education ==
Broughton Fields Primary School and Brooklands Farm Primary School serve the area, whilst secondary education is provided by Oakgrove School in nearby Middleton and the Walton High School campus in Brooklands. Broughton Manor Preparatory School, a private prep school, is also situated near the old village.

== Facilities ==
The facilities in the area include a 'Hungry Horse' chain public house, and a range of small shops, hair dressers and convenience stores.

Milton Keynes Coachway and the Kingston Shopping Centre – which includes one of the UK's larger Tesco stores, a variety of retail outlets, a branch library and a community centre – are nearby.

Broughton Pavilion is a community recreational and sports facility owned and managed by the parish council, which is based there. The building features a living roof.

The Broughton Brook linear park and Brooklands Meadow park provide green space for recreation. The northern tip of Broughton is open space and a conservation area.

== Civil parish ==
Prior to the designation of Milton Keynes (the new city), Broughton civil parish totalled 936 acres (379 ha) and included land east of what is now the M1 motorway. The Victoria County History of Buckingham, cites a Board of Agriculture figure from 1905 stating 75 per cent of the parish was grassland.

Retaining for many years their identities as distinct civil parishes with a joint parish council, on 1 January 2025 the parishes merged to become a single civil parish, Broughton and Milton Keynes. In 2011 the parish of Broughton had a population of 2493.

== St Lawrence's Church ==
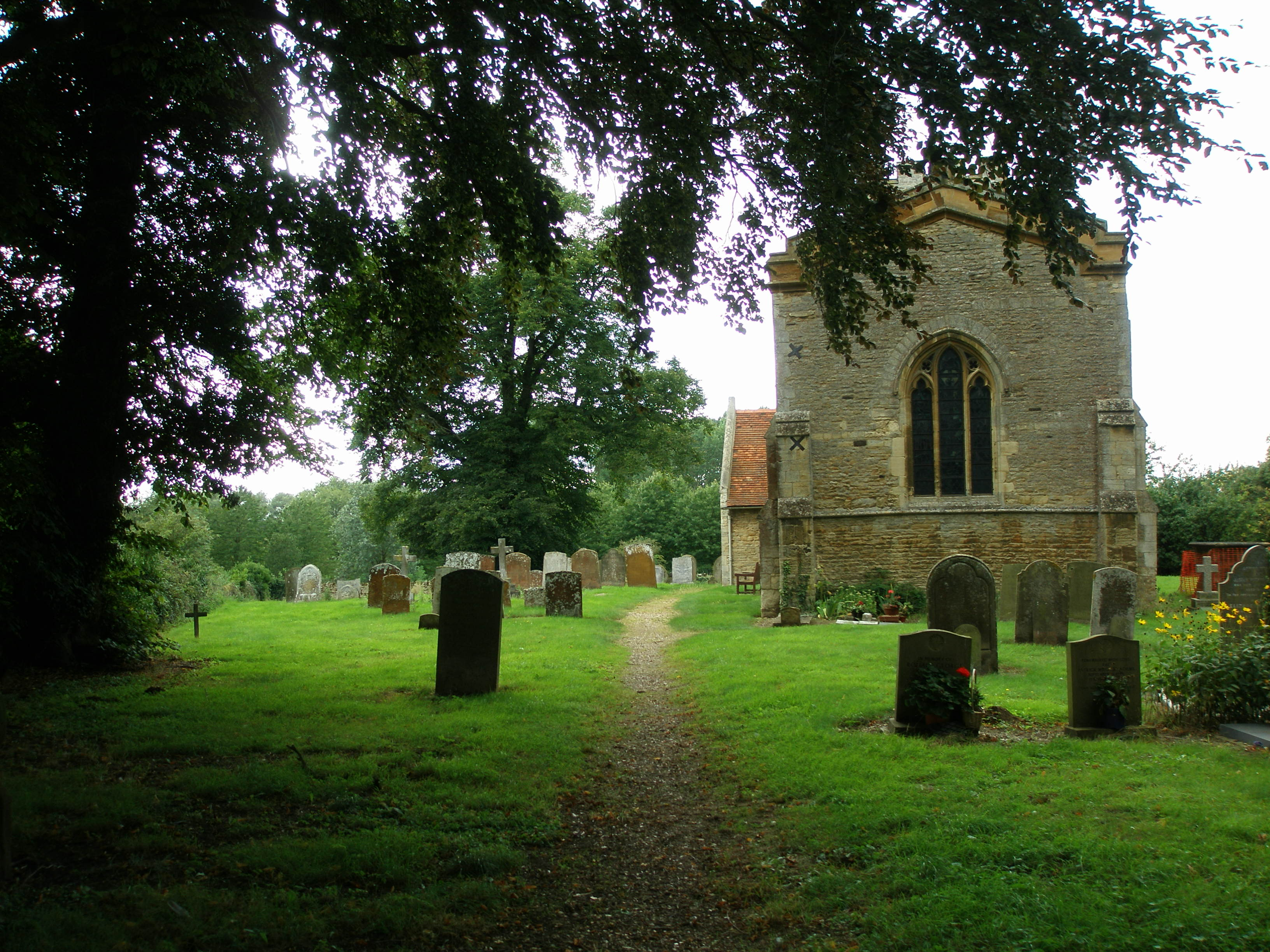
St Lawrence's, Broughton

St Lawrence's Church in Broughton is a 14th-century church with a 15th-century tower. A series of wall paintings covering large parts of the north and south walls, discovered during an 1849 restoration, is the chief interest of the church. The paintings include a 14th-century Pietà, a Doom, St Helena and St Eligius, and St George slaying the Dragon. The rectors of St Lawrence are recorded from the end of 1261 to date, and many may be interred within the grounds of St Lawrence.

== Canal development ==
Its promoters hope that a proposed new waterway between Milton Keynes and Bedford will run along the line of Broughton Brook.
