= River Ouzel =

River in Beds and Bucks, England

River Ouzel River Lovat
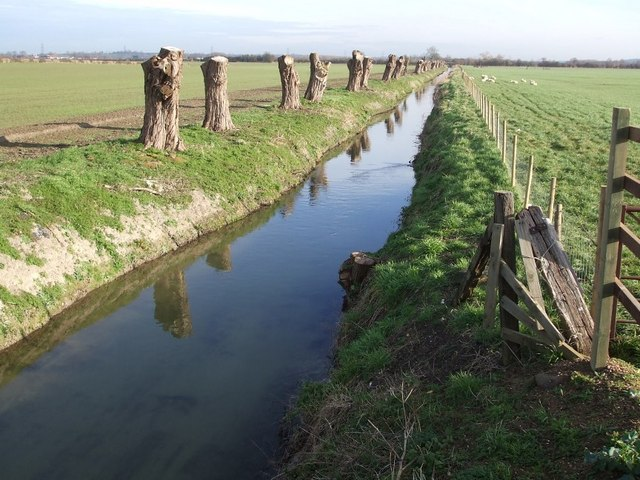
- River Ouzel between Northall and Billington

- Location within the United Kingdom

Location
- Country: England
- Counties: Bedfordshire and Buckinghamshire

Physical characteristics
- Source: Chiltern Hills
- Mouth: River Great Ouse
  - location: Newport Pagnell
  - coordinates: 52°05′15″N 0°43′00″W
- Length: 20 miles (32 km)

The River Ouzel /ˈuːzəl/, also known as the River Lovat, is a river in England, and a tributary of the River Great Ouse. It rises in the Chiltern Hills and flows 20 miles (32 km) north to join the Ouse at Newport Pagnell.

It is usually called the River Ouzel, except near Newport Pagnell where both names are used. The name Lovat was recorded (in the form 'Lovente') in the thirteenth century, a map of 1724 marks the river as "Lowsel R", and a map surveyed in 1765 shows it as 'Ouzel River'. The modern Ordnance Survey uses only the name Ouzel, except north of Willen Lake where it is marked as 'River Ouzel or Lovat'.

== Course ==
From springs just north of Dagnall, the river initially forms the boundary between Bedfordshire and Buckinghamshire. It is joined by the Ouzel Brook from Houghton Regis, and by Whistle Brook (also known at Ivinghoe as Whizzle Brook) from Pitstone. Near Grove Lock, just south of Leighton Buzzard, it was once joined by Ledburn Brook, which has since been diverted into the Grand Junction Canal (now the Grand Union Canal). At Leighton Buzzard, the river is joined by Clipstone Brook from Milton Bryan via Hockliffe and Clipstone, and to the north of the town the excess water from the canal is released into the river at the Twelve Arches. The river then flows through Milton Keynes, where the flood risk it presents (both locally and to communities downstream on the Ouse) is managed by two large balancing lakes, Caldecotte Lake and Willen Lake. After flowing east under the M1, the river is joined by Crawley Brook from Husborne Crawley. Finally, the river flows through Newport Pagnell to its junction with the Great Ouse.

== See also ==
- Linear park – Long strip of naturally occurring land for recreation. The long and winding flood plain of the Ouzel in Milton Keynes is managed as a linear park, part of the city's network of easily-reached open spaces.
  - Milton Keynes Parks Trust – Managers of most of the city's open spaces
