= Loughton (disambiguation) =

Loughton may refer to:

== Places in the United Kingdom ==
- Loughton, Essex
  - Loughton tube station, the London Underground station in Loughton
  - Loughton Camp, an Iron Age hill fort in Epping Forest near Loughton
  - Loughton Brook, stream located in Epping Forest near Loughton
  - Loughton incinerator thefts, 1988–1992 bank incinerator thefts at Bank of England incinerator plant in Loughton
- Loughton, Essex politics
  - Loughton Residents Association, Political party in the United Kingdom
  - Loughton St John's (ward), Electoral ward encapsulating Loughton
  - Loughton Urban District, a local government district from 1900 to 1933
- Loughton and Great Holm, civil parish in the City of Milton Keynes, Buckinghamshire
  - Loughton, Milton Keynes
  - All Saints Church, Loughton, the oldest church in Loughton, Milton Keynes
- Loughton, Shropshire

== Other uses ==
- Loughton (surname)
