= Howe Park Wood =

Woodland in Tattenhoe, Buckinghamshire, England

Coordinates: 52.002243°N 0.787244°W

- Site of Special Scientific Interest
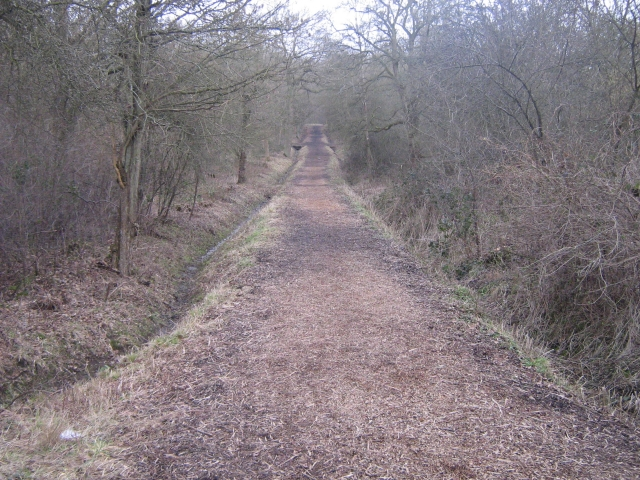
- Location of Howe Park Wood.
- Area of search: Buckinghamshire
- Grid reference: SP833344
- Interest: Biological
- Area: 21.4 ha (53 acres)
- Notification date: 1994
- Location map: Magic Map

Howe Park Wood is a 21.4-hectare (53-acre) Site of Special Scientific Interest in Tattenhoe, a district of Milton Keynes in Buckinghamshire. It is owned by Milton Keynes City Council and managed by Milton Keynes Parks Trust.

The site is semi-natural woodland which is recorded in the thirteenth century, and possibly the eleventh century. Ancient large oak trees may reflect a medieval past as a deer park. It is poorly drained on clay, causing seasonal waterlogging, with some areas which are drier. Loughton Brook runs along the boundary. There is a wide variety of trees and shrubs, and almost three hundred species of moths have been recorded. Butterflies include the nationally rare black hairstreak.

The park is between Chaffron Way and Tattenhoe Street.

== See also ==
- Oxley Mead
