= Grade II* listed buildings in the City of Milton Keynes =

There are over 20,000 Grade II* listed buildings in England. This page is a list of these buildings in the City of Milton Keynes unitary authority area in Buckinghamshire.

== List ==
Name	Location	Type	Completed (Note: The date given is the date used by Historic England as significant for the initial building or that of an important part in the structure's description.)	Date designated	Grid ref. (Note: The grid reference is based on the British national grid reference system, sometimes known as OSGB36, used by the Ordnance Survey.) Geo-coordinates	Entry number (Note: The "List Entry Number" is a unique number assigned to each listed building and scheduled monument by Historic England.)	Image
Church of St Peter	Astwood	Parish Church	14th century	17 November 1966	SP9505247374; 52°06′59″N 0°36′48″W	1289631	Church of St Peter More images
Church of St Martin	Fenny Stratford, Bletchley and Fenny Stratford	Church	1724-30	28 June 1954	SP8825434069; 51°59′53″N 0°42′57″W	1125422	Church of St Martin More images
11 and 13 Watling Street	Fenny Stratford, Bletchley and Fenny Stratford	House	C16/C17	26 September 1975	SP8830034058; 51°59′53″N 0°42′55″W	1125436	11 and 13 Watling Street
Church of All Saints	Bow Brickhill	Church	Earlier	17 November 1966	SP9114734401; 52°00′02″N 0°40′25″W	1212249	Church of All Saints More images
Bradwell House	Bradwell	House	Early 18th century	17 November 1966	SP8331339724; 52°02′59″N 0°47′11″W	1159875	Upload Photo
Church of St Lawrence	Bradwell	Church	Restored	17 November 1966	SP8314239472; 52°02′51″N 0°47′21″W	1310793	Church of St Lawrence More images
Church of All Saints	Lower Weald, Calverton	Parish Church	1818-1824	12 June 1953	SP7902939018; 52°02′38″N 0°50′57″W	1125411	Church of All Saints More images
Manor Farm House	Lower Weald, Calverton	Farmhouse	Late 15th century or early 16th century	12 June 1953	SP7902939100; 52°02′41″N 0°50′57″W	1125412	Upload Photo
Woolstones Community Centre	Little Woolstone, Campbell Park	Bell Tower	14th century	17 November 1966	SP8756339290; 52°02′42″N 0°43′29″W	1125230	Woolstones Community Centre More images
Chicheley Hall dovecote	Chicheley	Dovecote	18th century	3 March 1952	SP9047845777; 52°06′11″N 0°40′50″W	1212329	Upload Photo
Chicheley Hall service wing	Chicheley	House	1952	3 March 1952	SP9055145907; 52°06′15″N 0°40′46″W	1289598	Upload Photo
Chicheley Hall stable block	Chicheley	Country House	1723-25	3 March 1952	SP9051445825; 52°06′12″N 0°40′48″W	1212279	Upload Photo
Church of St Mary	Cold Brayfield	Parish Church	12th century	17 November 1966	SP9293152248; 52°09′38″N 0°38′34″W	1212337	Church of St Mary More images
Church of All Saints	Emberton	Parish Church	c. 1340	17 November 1966	SP8849649456; 52°08′11″N 0°42′30″W	1115943	Church of All Saints More images
Former Servants Lavatory at Gayhurst House (the Cerberus Privy)	Gayhurst	Toilet	1859-60	27 February 1984	SP8453546250; 52°06′29″N 0°46′01″W	1320166	Former Servants Lavatory at Gayhurst House (the Cerberus Privy) More images
Gayhurst Court Mews	Gayhurst	House	1984	17 November 1966	SP8455346223; 52°06′28″N 0°46′01″W	1211955	Upload Photo
Gayhurst Court Mews (the Dovecote) and attached Gate Piers	Gayhurst	House	1966	17 November 1966	SP8461646146; 52°06′26″N 0°45′57″W	1115911	Upload Photo
Stone Pedestal to North West and South East of Gayhurst House (Gayhurst Court)	Gayhurst	Column	c. 1860	27 February 1984	SP8460946263; 52°06′30″N 0°45′58″W	1115913	Upload Photo
The Subway	Gayhurst	Gate	Before 1793	17 November 1966	SP8473546913; 52°06′51″N 0°45′50″W	1320183	Upload Photo
Church of St Andrew	Great Linford	Church	13th century	17 November 1966	SP8507242323; 52°04′22″N 0°45′37″W	1160090	Church of St Andrew More images
Former School House and Almhouses	Great Linford	House	1952	3 March 1952	SP8513342309; 52°04′21″N 0°45′34″W	1125275	Former School House and Almhouses More images
Linford Manor	Great Linford	Country House	c. 1680	3 March 1952	SP8524042272; 52°04′20″N 0°45′28″W	1125276	Linford Manor More images
Stable Blocks, to West of Linford Manor	Great Linford	Stable	c. 1720	17 November 1966	SP8512142270; 52°04′20″N 0°45′34″W	1310704	Upload Photo
Church of St Leonard and St Andrew	Little Linford, Haversham-cum-Little Linford	Parish Church	Early 13th century	17 November 1966	SP8459444214; 52°05′23″N 0°46′00″W	1212140	Upload Photo
Haversham Grange	Haversham, Haversham-cum-Little Linford	Farmhouse	14th century	3 March 1952	SP8307243124; 52°04′49″N 0°47′21″W	1212158	Upload Photo
Church of St Mary Magdalen	Little Brickhill	Parish Church	14th century	17 November 1966	SP9103432455; 51°58′59″N 0°40′33″W	1212666	Church of St Mary Magdalen More images
Church of All Saints	Loughton	Church	C13-15	17 November 1966	SP8375337881; 52°01′59″N 0°46′50″W	1310657	Church of All Saints More images
Manor Farmhouse	Loughton	Farmhouse	About 1580	3 March 1952	SP8339137831; 52°01′57″N 0°47′09″W	1332300	Upload Photo
Birds Cottage, 22 Broughton Road	Milton Keynes (village), Milton Keynes	House	14th century or earlier	21 May 1986	SP8892939098; 52°02′35″N 0°42′17″W	1125199	Upload Photo
Church of St James	New Bradwell	Church	1857-60	28 October 1976	SP8282941469; 52°03′55″N 0°47′35″W	1125329	Church of St James More images
84 High Street	Newport Pagnell	House	Early 18th century	24 July 1969	SP8746143904; 52°05′12″N 0°43′30″W	1125472	Upload Photo
Church of St Nicholas	Newton Blossomville	Parish Church	C12-C15	17 November 1966	SP9257651581; 52°09′17″N 0°38′54″W	1212987	Church of St Nicholas More images
Gilpin House, Orchard Side Cowper and Newton Museum	Olney	House	Early 18th century	3 March 1952	SP8897551272; 52°09′09″N 0°42′03″W	1125295	Gilpin House, Orchard Side Cowper and Newton Museum More images
Olney Wine Bar and Cross Keys House	Olney	House	Early 18th century	3 March 1952	SP8889951176; 52°09′06″N 0°42′07″W	1332279	Upload Photo
Orchard House including Front Railings	Olney	House	Built 18th century	6 May 1983	SP8890951652; 52°09′22″N 0°42′07″W	1222060	Upload Photo
The Vicarage including attached Coachhouse	Olney	Vicarage	Early 18th century	3 March 1952	SP8898851118; 52°09′04″N 0°42′03″W	1158059	The Vicarage including attached Coachhouse More images
Church of St Giles	Tattenhoe, Shenley Brook End	Church	16th century	19 August 1959	SP8290633955; 51°59′52″N 0°47′38″W	1125221	Church of St Giles More images
Church of St Thomas	Simpson	Church	Late 13th century	28 June 1954	SP8833336199; 52°01′02″N 0°42′51″W	1160223	Church of St Thomas More images
Burnham House	Stony Stratford	House	Earlier	12 October 1954	SP7875840185; 52°03′16″N 0°51′10″W	1160550	Upload Photo
Parish Church of St Mary and St Giles	Stony Stratford	Parish Church	1487	12 June 1953	SP7870240464; 52°03′25″N 0°51′13″W	1125375	Parish Church of St Mary and St Giles More images
The Bull Hotel	Stony Stratford	House	Late 18th century	12 June 1953	SP7871140504; 52°03′26″N 0°51′12″W	1332253	The Bull Hotel More images
The Cock Hotel	Stony Stratford	Inn	Pre 1742	12 June 1953	SP7868640526; 52°03′27″N 0°51′14″W	1310973	The Cock Hotel More images
Tower of Church of St Mary Magdalene	Stony Stratford	Tower	Late 13th century	12 June 1953	SP7858040648; 52°03′31″N 0°51′19″W	1310932	Tower of Church of St Mary Magdalene More images
48 High Street	Stony Stratford	Timber Framed House	Early 17th century	12 June 1953	SP7875740468; 52°03′25″N 0°51′10″W	1311040	Upload Photo
75 High Street	Stony Stratford	House	Late 18th century	12 June 1953	SP7863540535; 52°03′27″N 0°51′16″W	1125378	Upload Photo
92 and 94 High Street	Stony Stratford	Coaching Inn	Early-mid 18th century	12 June 1953	SP7859840597; 52°03′29″N 0°51′18″W	1159586	Upload Photo
12 and 13 Market Square	Stony Stratford	House	Later 17th century	12 June 1953	SP7864940321; 52°03′21″N 0°51′16″W	1332270	Upload Photo
Church of St Peter	Tyringham, Tyringham and Filgrave	Parish Church	12th century	17 November 1966	SP8593146699; 52°06′43″N 0°44′48″W	1115848	Church of St Peter More images
The Bathing Pavilion at Tyringham Hall	Tyringham, Tyringham and Filgrave	Summerhouse	1926	3 March 1952	SP8547046973; 52°06′52″N 0°45′12″W	1320232	Upload Photo
The Temple of Music at Tyringham Hall	Tyringham, Tyringham and Filgrave	Summerhouse	1926	3 March 1952	SP8551947018; 52°06′54″N 0°45′09″W	1115852	Upload Photo
St Michael's Church of the Open University	Walton	University	1966	17 November 1966	SP8848536885; 52°01′24″N 0°42′43″W	1160855	St Michael's Church of the Open University More images
Church of St Mary	Wavendon	Parish Church	13th century	17 November 1966	SP9115237199; 52°01′33″N 0°40′22″W	1289169	Church of St Mary More images
Wavendon House	Wavendon	Country House	Late 17th century	16 February 1984	SP9242637632; 52°01′46″N 0°39′15″W	1289190	Upload Photo
Bletchley Rectory Cottages and Museum	West Bletchley	Hall House	1447	26 September 1975	SP8632633620; 51°59′40″N 0°44′39″W	1160103	Upload Photo
Cowpers House	Weston Underwood	House	17th century	3 March 1952	SP8645050532; 52°08′47″N 0°44′17″W	1320237	Upload Photo
Church of St George the Martyr	Wolverton, Wolverton and Greenleys	Church	1843	28 October 1976	SP8183041077; 52°03′43″N 0°48′28″W	1125328	Church of St George the Martyr More images
Church of the Holy Trinity	Old Wolverton, Wolverton and Greenleys	Parish Church	14th century	12 June 1953	SP8032241300; 52°03′51″N 0°49′47″W	1125323	Church of the Holy Trinity More images
Railway Bridge (171c) Grand Union Canal	Wolverton, Wolverton and Greenleys	Railway Bridge	1834-5	23 May 2001	SP8188841440; 52°03′55″N 0°48′25″W	1246107	Railway Bridge (171c) Grand Union Canal More images
Church of St Mary	Woughton on the Green	Church	13th century	17 November 1966	SP8768837596; 52°01′47″N 0°43′24″W	1161141	Church of St Mary More images

== See also ==
- Grade I listed buildings in the City of Milton Keynes
- Scheduled monuments in the City of Milton Keynes
