= St Giles's Church, Tattenhoe =

Church in Milton Keynes, England

St Giles's, Tattenhoe
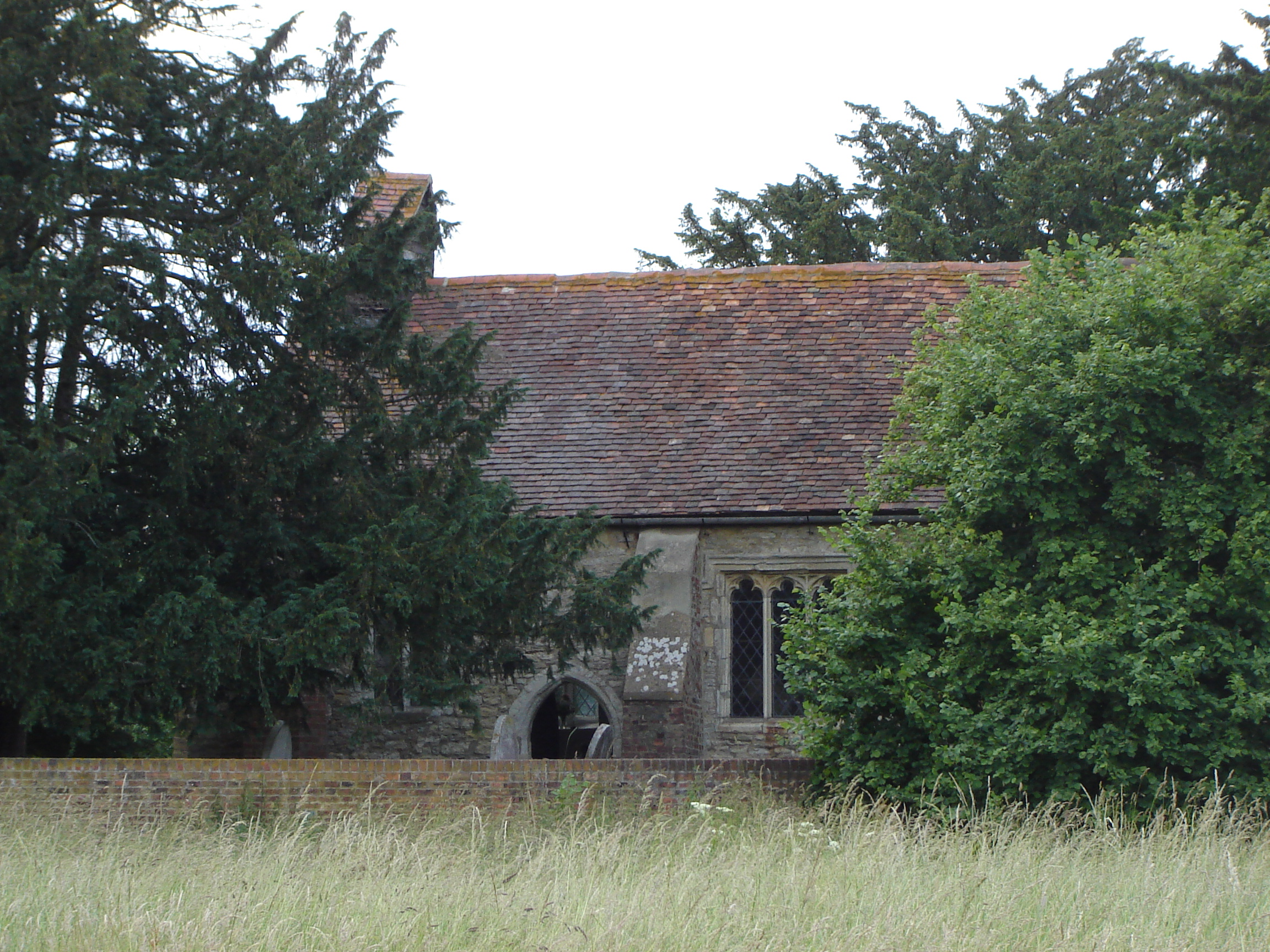
- The church from the south
- St Giles's, Tattenhoe
- 51.9978°N 0.7938°W
- Country: England
- Denomination: Church of England
- Churchmanship: Anglican/Ecumenical
- Website: www.wvep.org

History
- Dedication: St Giles

Architecture
- Heritage designation: Grade II* listed

Specifications
- Capacity: 55

Administration
- Province: Canterbury
- Diocese: Oxford
- Archdeaconry: Buckingham
- Deanery: Milton Keynes
- Parish: Watling Valley

St. Giles's Church is a small 16th century Church of England church in Tattenhoe, a district in south-west Milton Keynes, Buckinghamshire, England. It is of modest size but is a Grade II* listed building.

== Early history ==
The first St. Giles's Church was built on this site around 1200 AD. The yew trees in the churchyard have been dated from this time and were probably planted at the time the first church was established. This makes them some 800 years old. The building you see today dates from circa 1538. It is the second church building on the site and was constructed using the stones from nearby Snelshall Priory, after the first St. Giles's fell wholly into decay.

Beyond the churchyard in the meadow is the site of the lost village of Tattenhoe. The village disappeared without any records; the reason for its disappearance is not known.

After the Norman Conquest in 1066, land at Tattenhoe had been given by William the Conqueror to three of his Lords, Earl Hugh of Chester, Richard Ingania and Urse de Bersers. By 1167 ownership of both Tattenhoe and Snelshall had passed to Sybil d’Aungerville. She granted these lands at Snelshall to the Benedictine monks of Lavendon, to start a religious community - Snelshall Priory. Sybil d’Aungerville's grandson Ralph Martel gave some more of his land at Tattenhoe in 1216 to the lands already given to Snelshall Priory. Over 100 donations were given to the Priory during the following 100 years, some of these large, including the donations of the fishponds around St. Giles's.

Some of the stones were transported and used to rebuild St Giles's Church. Parts of today's St. Giles's are still recognisable as part of an earlier building - including the archway of the main door and the base of the font.

== Recent times ==
For hundreds of years, until the late 1980s, the parish of Tattenhoe comprised only three buildings: the farmhouses of Tattenhoe Bare, Tattenhoe Hall and Howe Park Farms. St. Giles's stood alone in the fields, surrounded by dense woods, fields, livestock and crops. For 460 years St Giles's was kept open for worship by the families living at the three farms and by worshippers from neighbouring villages including Whaddon, Newton Longville, Shenley and Loughton. They walked across the fields on summer Sunday evenings to make sure the church stayed in use for worship and for future generations. The stained glass window in the church dates to 1919.

The only way for worshippers to reach St. Giles's was via footpaths through fields. In the days before Milton Keynes this was a popular outing for local people, to come to services here. The highest-attended service each year was Harvest Festival, which is still celebrated today. There was no road to the church until the late 1950s, when a local farmer built a long, narrow single track from the Whaddon Road to his farm, and allowed worshippers to use this private track as an access to the church. This remained the way to the church until the end of the 1990s, when Portishead Drive and today's car park were built. The route of this old track is now a redway that runs from Hengistbury Lane north through Westcroft.

In 1996 work started on the first foundations of the houses of new Tattenhoe around the church. In late 1999 the Churchwardens invited Immanuel, a new congregation within the Watling Valley Ecumenical Partnership, to hold weekly services at St. Giles's.

The church has recently been extensively redecorated, with the walls repainted and the pews and other woodwork grained in traditional style. In summer 2007, the installation of electricity was completed.

== See also ==
- Grade I listed buildings in the City of Milton Keynes
- Grade II* listed buildings in the City of Milton Keynes
