= Local ecumenical partnership =

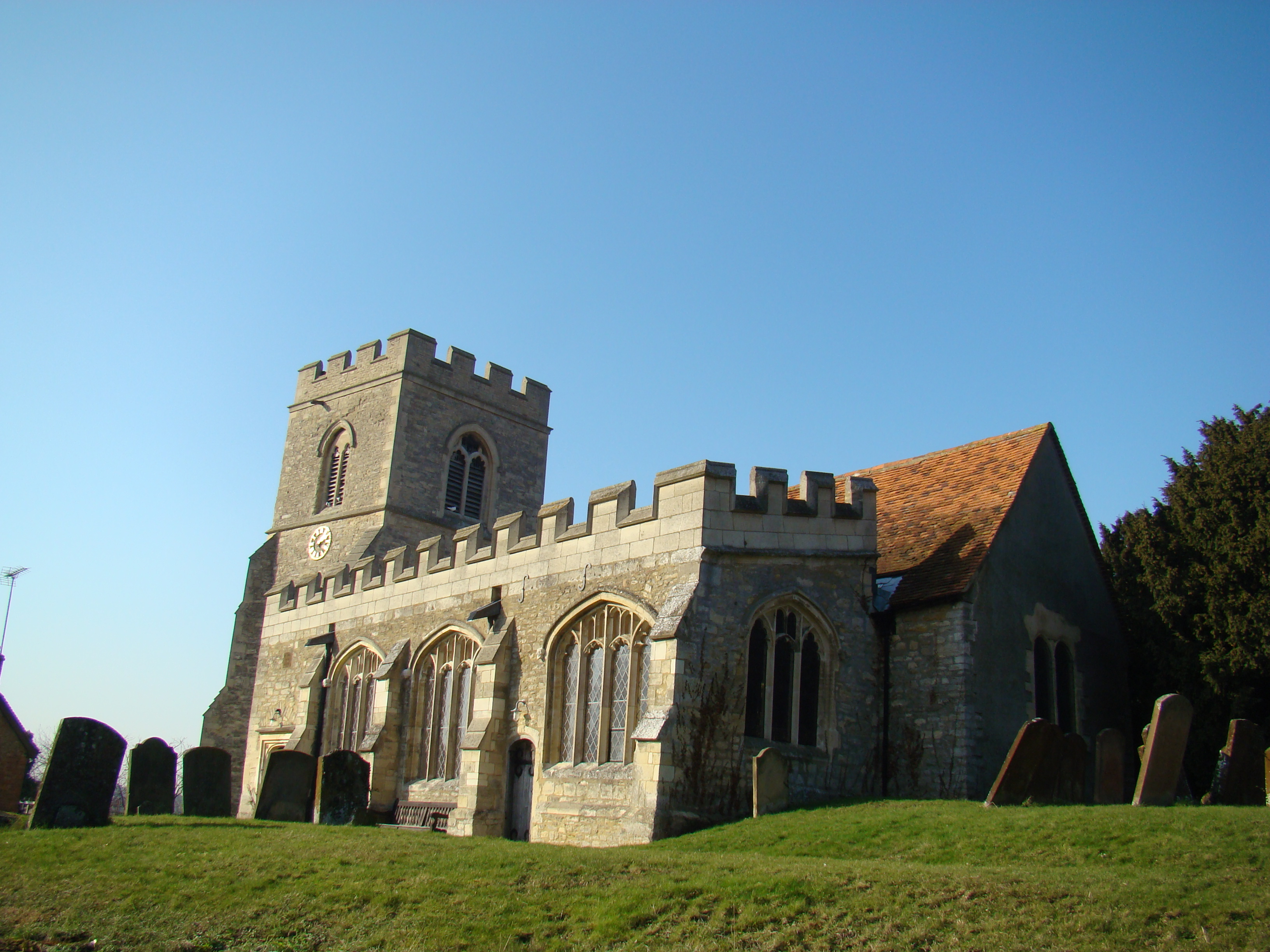
All Saints Church, Milton Keynes, is a part of the Watling Valley Ecumenical Partnership between the Anglicans, Baptists, Methodists and United Reformed Church.

In England and Wales, a local ecumenical partnership or local ecumenical project (LEP) is a partnership between churches of different denominations. First piloted in 1964, over 850 now exist to promote unity between different Christian denominations.

The missiologist David Bosch in his Transforming Mission recognised ecumenism as the most recent paradigm of mission emerging from the worldwide Church. The main thrust of ecumenism is that despite the theological and cultural differences evident between denominations, the mission of any local Church is made more effective through a united witness. In some cases this has meant that a Christian presence has been retained in areas where neither denomination would be able to continue on its own. In addition, ecumenism encourages the sharing of different worship styles, the development of mutual understanding and the ability for the Church to speak with a united voice on social justice issues. Materials from organisations with a strong ecumenical emphasis, such as the Iona Community and Taizé, are evidence of this.

As a result of the Anglican-Methodist Covenant, Anglicans and Methodists are committed to working in partnership with an end goal of achieving full visible unity.

== See also ==
- Ministerial association
- Shared church
- World Council of Churches
