= St Mary's Church, Shenley =

Church in Milton Keynes, Buckinghamshire, England

Coordinates: 52.0225°N 0.7892°W

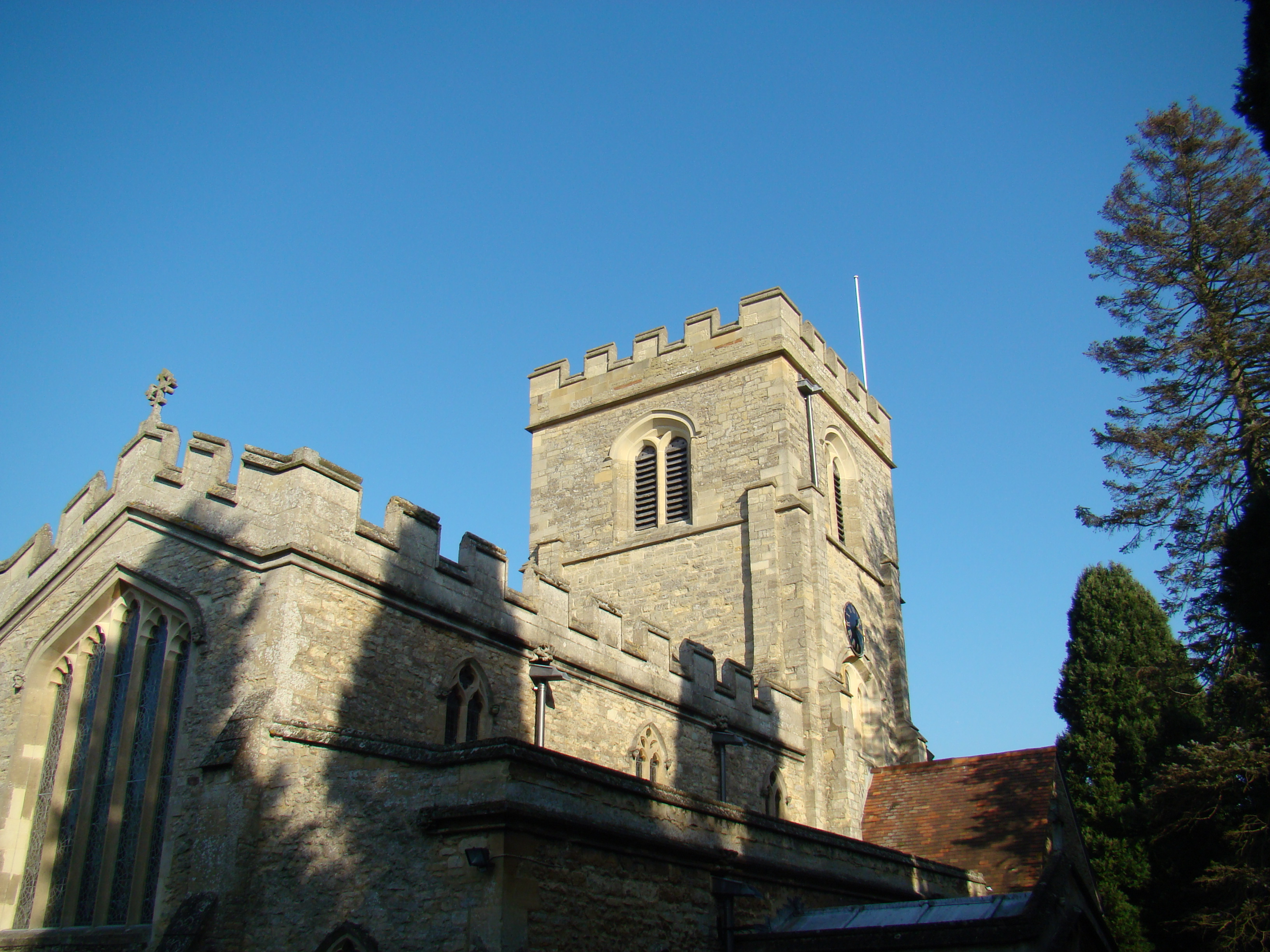
St. Mary's Church, Shenley, in the centre of the old village

St. Mary's Church, Shenley is an ecumenical church located in Shenley Church End, Milton Keynes, England. The church now forms part of the Watling Valley Ecumenical Partnership. It is likely that the church building existed in some form from 1223, for this is when the first rector is recorded. Parts of the nave date back to c.1150, and parts of the chancel date back to c.1180. The stonework in the church covers both Norman and Early English periods. The north aisle was built in the 14th century, and the Font in the 15th century. The church is Grade I listed, and seats approximately 120 people.
