= Denbigh School =

Academy in Milton Keynes, England

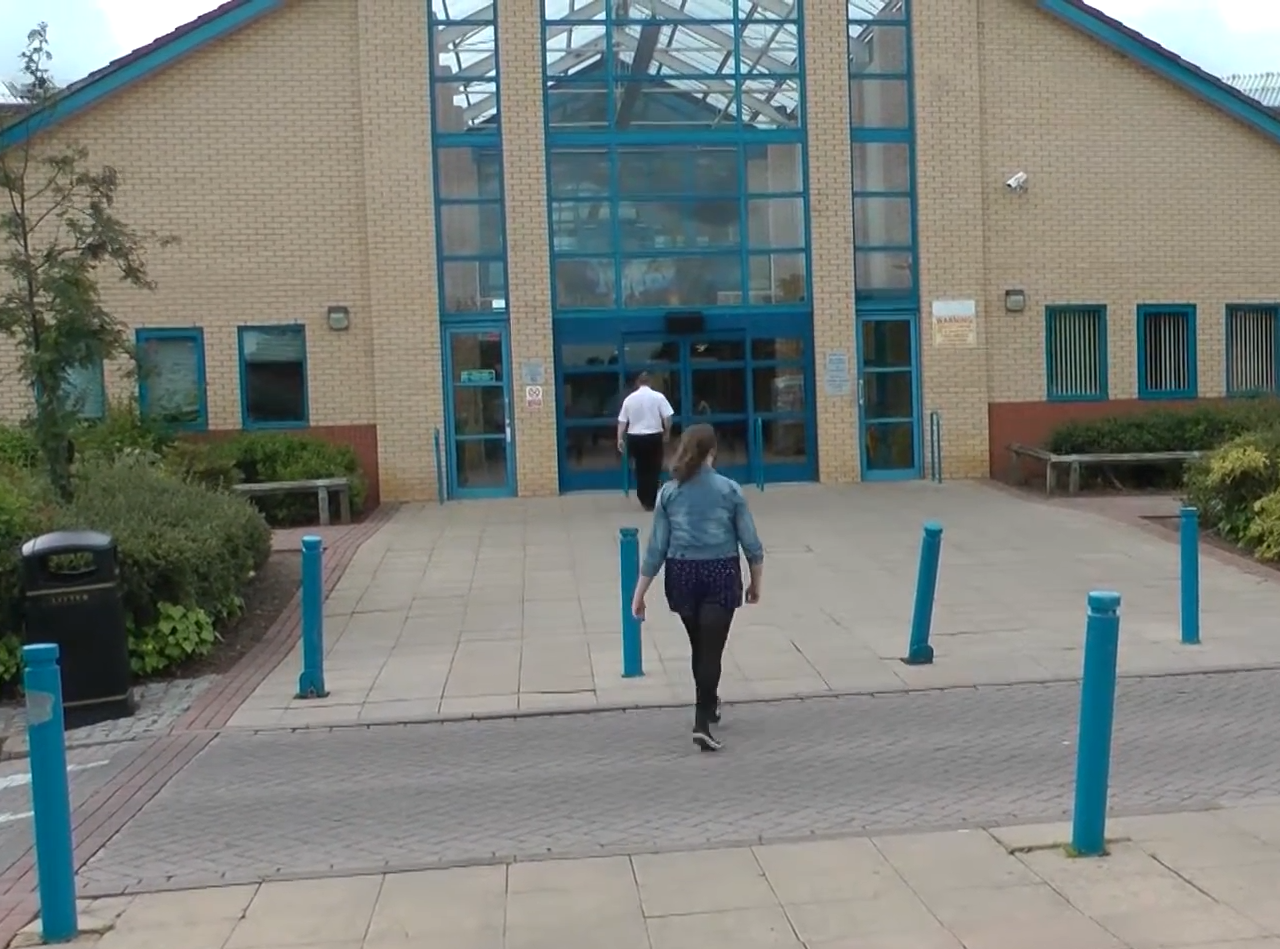

Location
- Burchard Crescent; Shenley Church End; Milton Keynes, Buckinghamshire, MK5 6EX; England; 52.025327°N 0.790953°W

Information
- Type: Academy
- Motto: Aspire, Innovate, Achieve, Belong
- Trust: Denbigh Alliance Multi Academy Trust
- Department for Education URN: 136468 Tables
- Ofsted: Reports
- Chair of Governors: D Wood
- Head Teacher: Anthony Steed
- Gender: Coeducational
- Age: 11 to 18
- Enrolment: 1,751
- Houses: Curie, Newton, Stephenson, Darwin, Brunel
- Website: http://www.denbigh.net/

Denbigh School is a secondary academy school in Shenley Church End, Milton Keynes in south central England.

== History ==
The original Denbigh School opened in September 1964, located on land at the northern end of Cornwall Grove in Bletchley. In the 1980s, the Local Education Authority resolved to relocate either Denbigh or (nearby) Lord Grey School (formerly Wilton) to Shenley Church End, a few miles to the north. Eventually, Denbigh was chosen to move. In 1991-1992, term years 8 and 9 were located at the new school, and other years were located at the old one. The new school was still in the process of being built at the time. All years moved into the new school in July 1992.

When the Shenley site opened in 1991, the site had the following areas completed: Humanities Block, Maths Block 50% (upstairs), Science Block, Technology Block, IT Room, Music Rooms, Sports Hall (shared with Shenley Leisure Centre), the dining room, and "the street" (an indoor communal area). Throughout that year, the English block was completed by Christmas and the playing fields by summer (prior to this, the pupils in the school did outdoor PE at Loughton Middle School (Loughton County Combined School at the time) playing fields or were bussed to the Bletchley site). In 1992, the school was completed at its next phase, with art rooms, an extended math block, a modern language block, a sixth-form block, a meeting hall, and gymnasium all opening.

Later extensions of the school involved a new science laboratory, further extensions to the art design and technology area, and more recently, an extended 6th grade block. With the increasing popularity of IT, part of the math block has become an ICT suite. In 2014, the school formed plans to turn its original meeting hall (opened in 1992) into a sixth form area soon after a new extension was completed, in which there is now a new meeting hall and a new art, drama, and music department. The new extension opened in 2015, and the sixth form area has been completed.

=== Old site ===
Shortly after the move from Bletchley, the old school was demolished. However the site remained unused for some years before it was built on as an extension to the "Counties" estate in Bletchley.

== Present day ==
As of September 2023, the school has 1,774 students, with 460 being in sixth form.

The school gained specialist Technology College in 1997 under the management of Roger Connibear which entitled it to money from the Government to fund its DT facilities, computer rooms, and its further activities - such as Further Maths at A level.

Anthony Steed took over as Headteacher from September 2024, having previously been Deputy Headteacher. From September 2019, the Head of School was Dr A Frame, with Andy Squires remaining as Executive Headteacher until his death in 2022. His predecessor was Sarah Parker in 2014, who took over from Roger Connibear in 2005, who took over from Gillian Parkinson in 1993 - The latter being involved in overseeing the move to Shenley from Cornwall Grove Bletchley.

In 2007 students from the school won the BBC's national Schools Question Time Competition. Students from Denbigh, and from three other winning schools, helped to produce an episode of the show, which was broadcast on 5 July 2007.

Denbigh School is consistently one of the top performing schools in Milton Keynes and is heavily oversubscribed.

== Athletes ==
- Ed Slater is an International Rugby Union player and a former pupil of Denbigh School
- Greg Rutherford is the London 2012 Long Jump Olympic Gold medallist and a former pupil of Denbigh School
- Chris Clarke MBE, who won gold medal in the 100 m – T11 & 200 m – T11 events at the Rio 2016 Paralympics competing as a guide runner
