= Turpin's Cave =

Coordinates: 51.665771°N 0.035293°E

Turpin's Cave is an area of Epping Forest in Essex which has been attributed as a hiding place of the highwayman Dick Turpin.

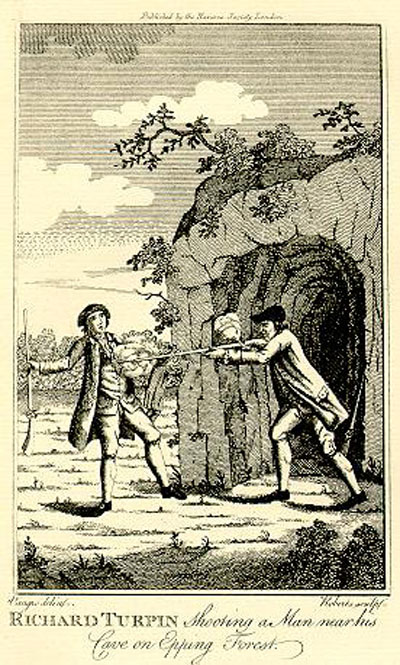
Eighteenth century depiction of Turpin murdering Thomas Morris from his cave

Dick Turpin knew Epping Forest well and organised many criminal activities from a base between the Loughton Road and Kings Oak Road, which in legend became known as 'Turpin's cave'. After an incident in May 1737, Turpin escaped to Epping Forest, where he hid (according to accounts "in a cave"). He was seen by Thomas Morris, a servant of one of the Forest's keepers close to what is now 'The Robin Hood' pub. Morris armed with pistols, attempted to capture Turpin on the 4th of May; Turpin however shot and killed him with a carbine. The murder was reported in The Gentleman's Magazine The terrain in most of Epping Forest comprises Bagshot Beds, which are sand and gravel and not solid enough to provide habitable caves such as the one illustrated.

Though several locations for Turpin's hiding place were suggested, legend attributed it to a site off Wellington Hill at High Beach. D'Oyley, the Loughton surveyor, who drew up the maps for the Epping Forest Commission in the 19th century marked the area to the north of Loughton Camp as Dick Turpin's Cave and the name was applied to a pub at that location B H Cowper, who excavated Loughton Camp in the 1870s referred to maps identifying Turpin's cave within the camp, but found no evidence of a cave there. However an identifiable dug-out was visible in the 19th century as in 1883 John Croumbie Brown wrote "Turpin's Cave is as much one of the exhibitions of Epping Forest as Turpin's Oak is of Finchley Common, and who shall begrudge to the admirers of each, in these unromantic and prosaic days, the indulgence of their tastes".

The Turpin's Inn pub dates from some time in the 19th century as it was visited by John Davidson in 1893 who complains in his "Random Itinerary" of being made to pay a deposit for the drinking pot there. A housing development has since been built over the pub but next to it was a fenced-off dug-out in the clay and gravel soil described as Turpin's Cave, all or part of which was visible when the photograph was taken in the 1960s.

The site in Epping Forest is not the only one with the name Turpin's Cave. There is a "Turpin's Cave" at the edge of Bostall Woods in Plumstead Another site known as Dick Turpin’s Cave is at Rammamere Heath near Heath and Reach, Bedfordshire .
