= Snelshall Priory =

Ruined Benedictine priory in Milton Keynes, Buckinghamshire

Coordinates: 52.002°N 0.813°W

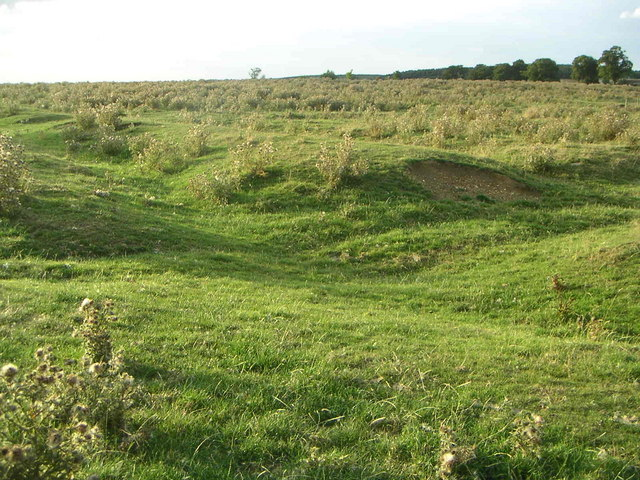
Site of Snelshall Priory.

Snelshall Priory was a Benedictine priory in Milton Keynes, Buckinghamshire in the United Kingdom, built around 1200. The priory was founded after Sybil d'Aungerville granted land at Tattenhoe to Lavendon Abbey, a Premonstratensian monastery of 'White canons' who most likely started a cell at Snelshall. This did not thrive and was abandoned about 1207. About 1219, the founder's son brought in Benedictine monks, increased the endowment and the new monastery began again. However Snelshall Priory paid 1 mark a year to Lavendon until 1232, at which point the Bishop of Lincoln decided that Snelshall owned its own lands and chapel. The priory accumulated various land through gifts, but even with all these grants, in 1321 when Henry Burghersh visited, it was so poor that "the monks scarcely had the necessities of life and had to beg even for these".

Yet the priory remained until the mid-sixteenth century. In 1529, Bishop Longford found "irregularities" among the two or three monks that remained, and as a result all women, married and unmarried, were barred from the precinct of the priory. Only two women, both over 48 years old and of "unexceptional character", were retained as servants. In 1535, there remained three monks, two priests (of which one was a novice), the prior's parents with "all their goods" and eight servants. The house was in ruin, and later that year the priory was suppressed and turned over to The Crown.

The house was possibly rebuilt around 1540, possibly by Sir John Fortescue. Much of the priory's land went to the Longueville family. It is not known when the house was demolished.

The stones were recycled to build the nearby St Giles's Church, Tattenhoe.

== See also ==
- Bradwell Abbey
