= Ed Slater =

English rugby union player

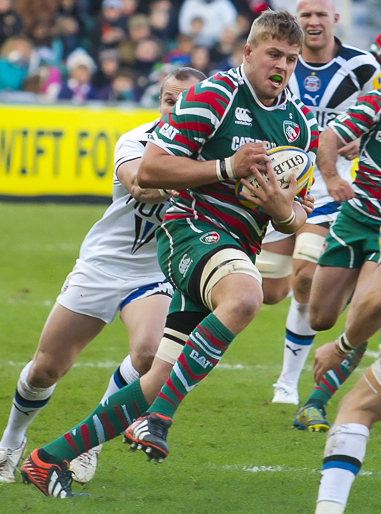
- Born: Edward Nicholas Slater; 1 August 1988 (age 38) Leicester, England
- Height: 1.96 m (6 ft 5 in)
- Weight: 116 kg (18 st 4 lb)
- School: Denbigh School

Rugby union career
- Position: Lock/Flanker
Amateur team(s)
Years	Team	Apps	(Points)
2007–2010	Eastern Suburbs		
Senior career
Years	Team	Apps	(Points)
2010	Nottingham	7	(10)
2010–2017	Leicester Tigers	136	(55)
2017–2022	Gloucester	94	(50)
2010–2022	Total	237	(115)
- Correct as of 14:03, 21 July 2022 (UTC)
International career
Years	Team	Apps	(Points)
2012–2022	England Saxons	4	(0)
- Correct as of 14:03, 21 July 2022 (UTC)

Edward Nicholas Slater (born 1 August 1988) is an English former rugby union player who played at lock for Leicester Tigers and Gloucester Rugby.

Slater has captained both Leicester Tigers and Gloucester. He was Leicester Tigers club captain from 2014 to 2016. Slater captained Gloucester in the 2018 Challenge Cup final loss to Cardiff Blues. He has also captained England on their 2014 tour of New Zealand when they defeated the Crusaders in Christchurch.

Following a diagnosis of motor neurone disease in July 2022, Slater retired from professional rugby.

== Early life ==
Slater was born 1 August 1988 in Leicester, Leicestershire, England. He grew up in Milton Keynes, Buckinghamshire and attended Denbigh School with Olympic Gold Medallist Greg Rutherford.

== Club career ==
=== Junior career ===
Born in Leicester, Slater began his rugby career at Milton Keynes RUFC before moving to Australia. He established himself at Eastern Suburbs RUFC, Sydney, in the under-21s side, and later played for the first team. He also enjoyed a short stint with the New South Wales Waratahs, where he was signed on a junior contract. After a short trial with Leicester Tigers he joined Nottingham at the opening stages of the playoff campaign. Here he played alongside future Tigers teammate Tom Youngs. His performances in the Championship playoffs and for the Tigers' development side earned him a move to his hometown club, Leicester Tigers in the summer of 2010.

=== Leicester Tigers ===
In 2009/10 Slater provided cover for long-term injuries to England international locks Louis Deacon and Geoff Parling, whilst the retirements of Ben Kay and Richard Blaze allowed him to break through to the first team squad. His consistent performances earned him Tigers' Player of the Month award in October 2010 and he went on to make over 30 appearances for the club in his first season. In the same season he helped Tigers top the leaderboard and make it to the Aviva Premiership final in the 2010–2011 season. A successful 2012/2013 campaign culminated in a Premiership winners medal for Slater, who was a used replacement in the final. He captained the Tigers in the 14/15 (although injured for the majority of the season, he returned to captain the side for the last 10 games) and 15/16 seasons.

=== Gloucester ===
On 7 August 2017, Slater left Leicester to sign for Gloucester Rugby as part of a swap deal with Jonny May joining Leicester Tigers from the 2017–18 season. On 21 July 2022, he announced that he had been diagnosed with motor neurone disease and retired immediately.

== International career ==
Slater was selected in the England Saxons squad in 2012. He was selected in the senior England Squad in 2012/13, but an injury sustained in the Aviva Premiership final ruled him out of the tour shortly after being selected. He was then selected for both the 2014 Six Nations and the summer tour to New Zealand, where he captained England against the Canterbury Crusaders in his first appearance for the senior England side. Slater was included in Stuart Lancaster's World Cup 51 man training squad. He also featured in Eddie Jones' plans at the beginning of 2016, but suffered a knee injury.

== Honours ==
Leicester Tigers

- Premiership Rugby winner : 2013,
- Anglo-Welsh Cup : 2012, 2017
- Premiership Rugby runner-up: 2011, 2012

Gloucester Rugby

- EPCR Challenge Cup runner-up: 2018
