= Pink Punters =

Former LGBT+ nightclub

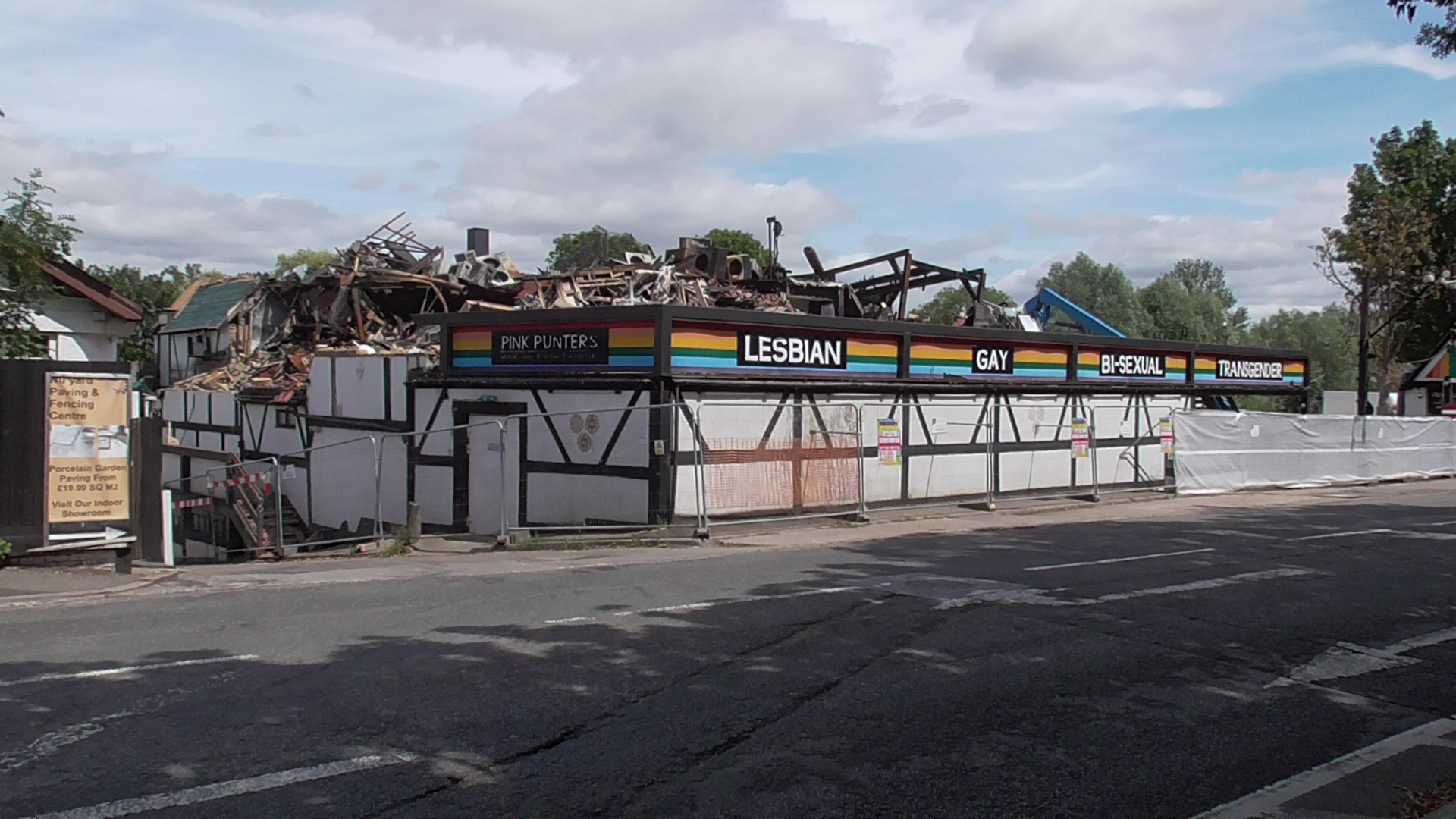
- What remains of the nightclub in July 2026.

- Location in Buckinghamshire
- Address: Watling Street, Bletchley
- Location: Milton Keynes, Buckinghamshire, England
- Coordinates: 51.997225°N 0.711870°W
- Owner: Pink Punters Ltd
- Operator: Pink Punters Ltd
- Type: Nightclub

Construction
- Closed: 2026

Website
- pinkpunters.com

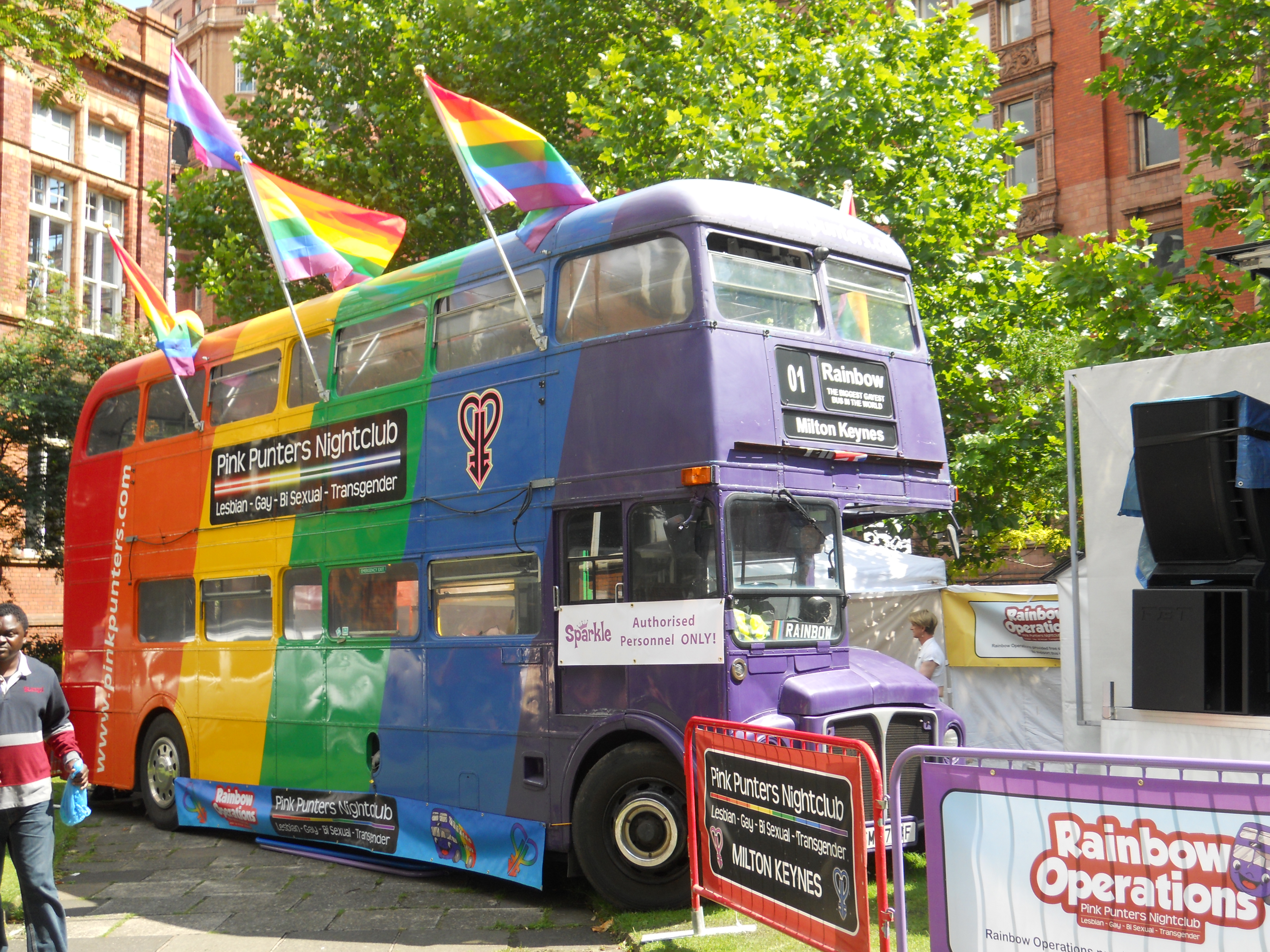
A Pink Punters branded AEC Routemaster in July 2011.

Pink Punters is an LGBT+ nightclub on Watling Street in the Bletchley area of Milton Keynes, Buckinghamshire, England. Long described as "one of the best‑known LGBTQ+ nightlife venues outside London", it operated across three floors. The venue was partially destroyed by a fire in April 2026, an incident later ruled accidental.

== History ==
Described as "one of the best-known LGBTQ+ nightlife venues outside London", the nightclub stood on Watling Street in the Bletchley area of Milton Keynes. It operated across three floors, with multiple bars and a "quiet lounge with open fire". Pink Punters held national accreditation for its safety standards and management.

In 2012, a man was injured in a Halloween display. In 2014, the nightclub commissioned a piece of public art celebrating Alan Turing.

In late October 2021, an alleged case of needle spiking involving a female party-goer was reported at the venue, although police found nothing to suggest that such an incident had occurred.

On Christmas Day 2022, an 18-year-old was stabbed outside of the nightclub with two separate gatherings of people involved in the altercation. A 20-year-old man was arrested on suspicion of section 18 wounding with intent with him later being released on bail.

In the early hours of 26 April 2026, patrons were evacuated following the outbreak of a fire. Twelve fire crews from Buckinghamshire Fire and Rescue Service attended the scene. Just hours earlier, another suspicious fire had been reported at St Martin's Church, Fenny Stratford. Investigators examined possible links between the two incidents. A Milton Keynes-based charity offered support to those affected. A man was arrested on suspicion of arson with intent to endanger life.

On 30 April 2026, following investigations by Thames Valley Police and Buckinghamshire Fire and Rescue Service, the nightclub fire was ruled accidental, ruling out third-party involvement. The man previously arrested was eliminated from enquiries.

The same family has owned the plot of land for 36 years, on which the club has stood since 31st October 2000. The owners confirm the nightclub will return soon.
