= Church of St Mary, Wavendon =

Church in Buckinghamshire, England

Coordinates: 52.025727°N 0.672892°W

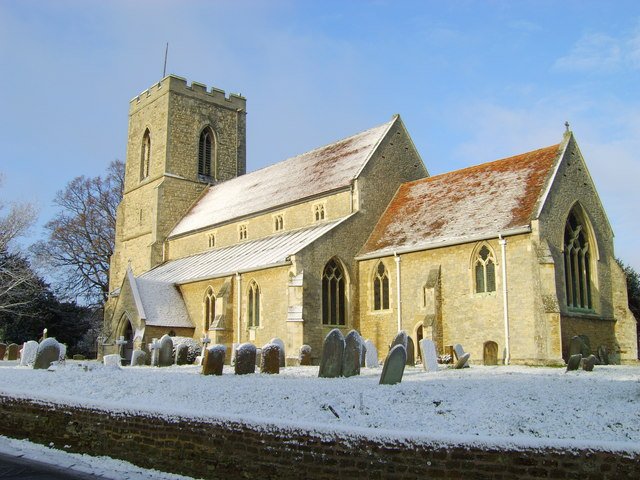
Church of St Mary, Wavendon

Church of St Mary is a 13th-century parish church in the village of Wavendon, City of Milton Keynes, Buckinghamshire, England. It was designated a Grade II* listed building in 1966.

== History ==
The church, dedicated to the Assumption of the Blessed Virgin, was entirely restored under the direction of Mr. Butterfield, architect, in 1848–49, at a cost of about £4,000, raised by subscription and donation.

== Architecture and fittings ==
The components of the church are a chancel, nave with aisles, clerestory and south porch, and a west tower. The style of the chancel is Early Decorated, the piers and arches of the nave are very fine Decorated, and the roofs, the clerestory, and the tower are good Perpendicular. The tower is embattled and contains five bells.

The principal entrance to the church is through the porch, and on the right-hand side of the doorway is the holy-water stoupe. The side aisles are separated from the nave by four arches on each side, resting upon clustered columns. The aisles were formerly side chapels, the piscinas of which remain. The floor of the nave is paved with Mintons tiles, red and black, and pointed with Keane's white cement. The stalls, or open seats, are of oak, with carved ends. The pulpit—an old one, bought from the church of St Dunstan-in-the-West, London, is of carved oak, raised upon a stone base, and ascended by stone steps. There is a moveable lectern of oak, for the lessons, and a fakl-stool for the litany. The large font, of Totternhoe stone, is sculptured, and has a carved cover of oak, suspended from above by chains, and a gilt dove. The roof of the nave, which is covered with lead, is of tall, and has sculptured heads for corbels. The clerestory windows are glazed with green tinted cathedral glass. There are some windows of two lights in the aisles, and a three-light one at the east end of the north aisles.

The chancel arch is pointed and well proportioned. Beneath it is a low screen, coloured in the mouldings and panels, with green and red on a white ground, and a pair of highly finished solid gates of brass enriched with enamelled work, and supported by two brass standards, tufted with flowered finials representing the sun-flower. The fine east window, in four divisions, and is filled with stained glass. In the south wall are a double piscina, and triple sedilia; the sedile farthest from the east being the largest of the three, with a semicircular head, the two others being lancet-pointed. Recessed in the opposite wall, is an arcade, containing four stone stalls with plain semicircular arches. The oak-panelled roof of the chancel is coloured ultra-marine, and thickly studded with stars of gold, extending to the head of the east window, which contains figures amidst the stars, of the Greater and Lesser Light. An illuminated scroll is banded closely round the label moulding of the same window, and bears an appropriate inscription. The backs of the sedilia are coloured ultra-marine, with fluer-de-lis. The floor is paved with red and buff encaustic tiles, the estrade being of a richer pattern. The communion table consists of a massive oak frame supporting a slab of blue lias—the whole covered with ante-pendium of rich velvet elegantly embroidered. The communion table is adorned by a cross, a pair of candlesticks, and a brass desk. In the chancel are oak stalls with carved poppy-heads, for the choristers; and in an apartment on the north side (which serves also for a robing-room) is an organ, built by Walker of London in 1849.

Besides the east window, the chancel contains two other stained glass windows, on the south side, representing the Annunciation and the Adoration of the Magi. The window at the end of the north aisle is also a stained glass one. exhibiting, the Crucifixion, with the figures of the Virgin Mother and St. John, on either side. In the south aisle is a memorial window representing the Resurrection. Near it is another window, a memorial. It contains figures of St. Catherine and St. Agnes. The whole of the stained glass is by O'Connor of London.

In the north aisle is a handsome mural monument of marble to Sir Henry Hugh Hoare, Bart. of Wavendon House. At the west end of the same aisle is a carved mural monument to the memory of George Wells. Under the east window of the north aisle is an illuminated mural brass to the memory of Henry Arthur Hoare, Esq., of Wavendon House, youngest son of Sir Henry Hugh Hoare. In the north aisle is a coloured memorial window. On the west wall of the vestry is a black marble with a brass plate.

== Grounds ==
In the churchyard is a modern cross, and there are memorial stones to members of the families of Boyle, Bumey, Fairtlough, Hoare, Lane, Mayor, etc.
