= St Martin's Church, Fenny Stratford =

Church in England

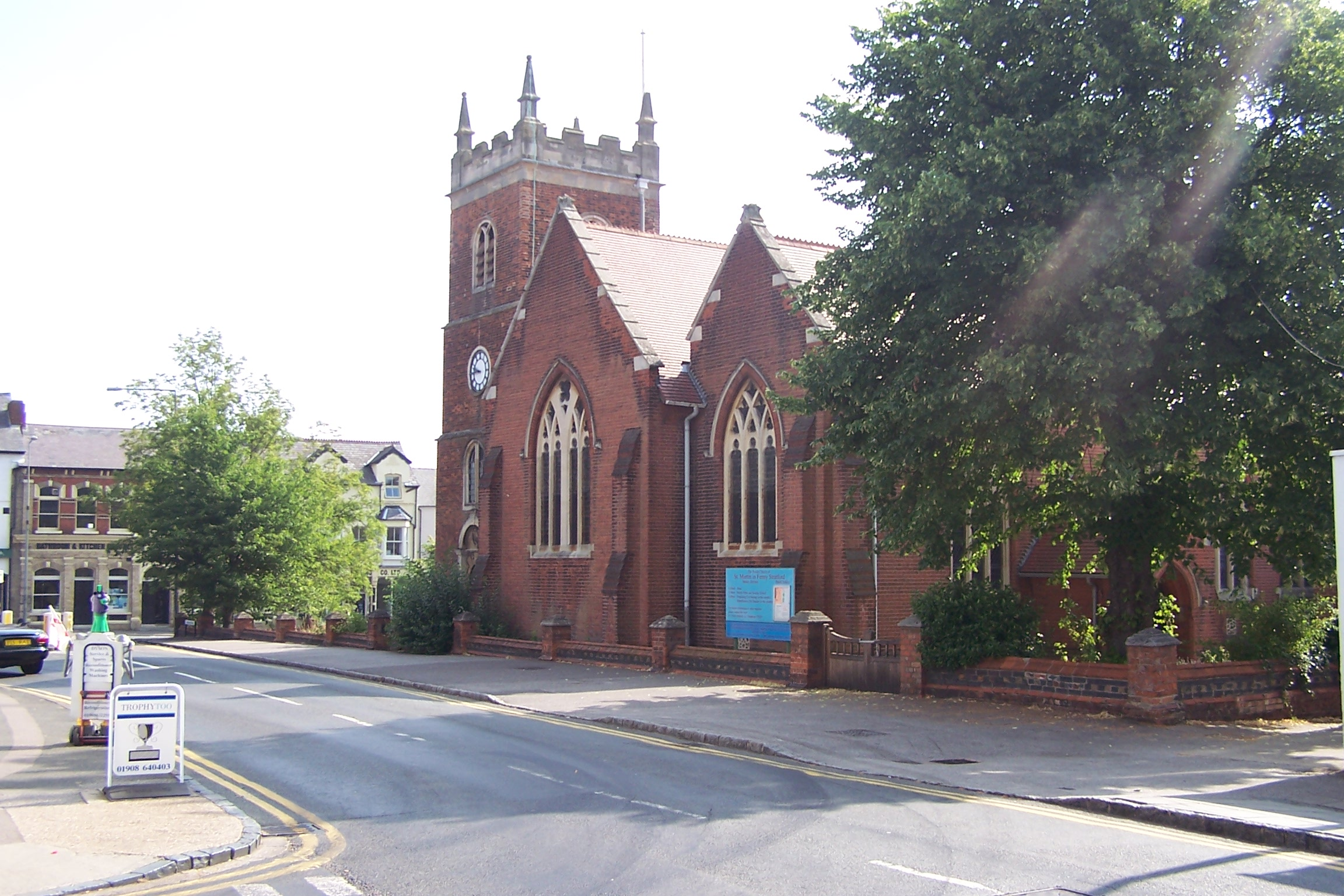
- St Martin's Church in 2006

Religion
- Affiliation: Anglicanism
- Ecclesiastical or organisational status: active

Location
- Location: Aylesbury Street, Fenny Stratford, Buckinghamshire, England
- Interactive map of St Martin's Church, Fenny Stratford
- Coordinates: 51.9981°N 0.715923°W

Architecture
- Architect: John Oldrid Scott
- Type: Church
- Style: Gothic Revival
- Completed: 1730

Website
- www.saintmartinschurch.co.uk

The St Martin's Church is a historic church in Fenny Stratford, Buckinghamshire, England.

== History ==
The church was constructed from 1724 to 1730 to designs by Edward Wing and John Simmonds. On 25 April 2026, a fire broke out at the church, the night before another suspicious fire was reported at Pink Punters, a nightclub down the road from the church.

== See also ==
- Grade II* listed buildings in the City of Milton Keynes
- List of Anglican churches
