= Ambresbury Banks =

Iron Age hillfort in England

Coordinates: 51.6835°N 0.0784°E

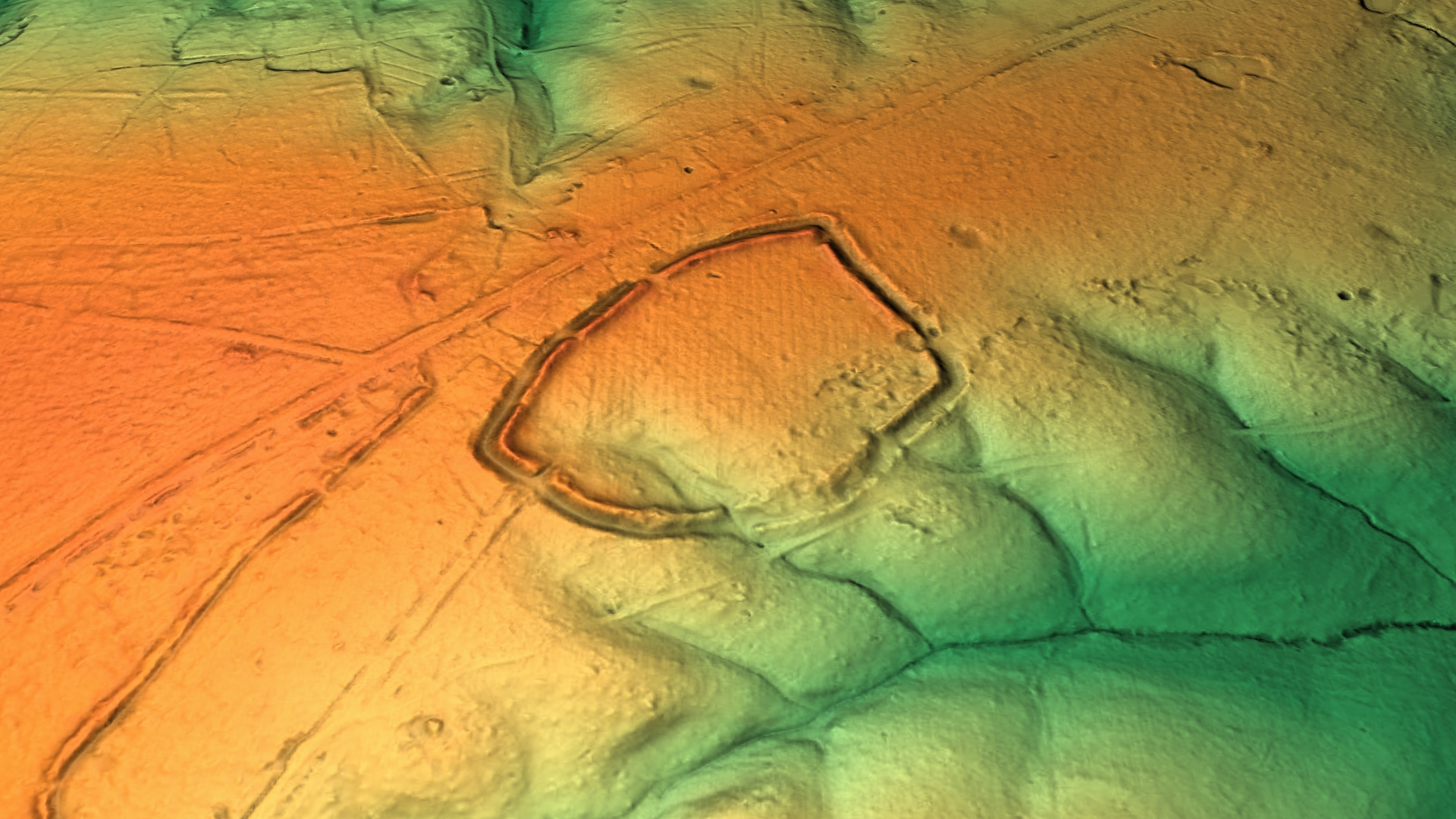
3D view of the digital terrain model

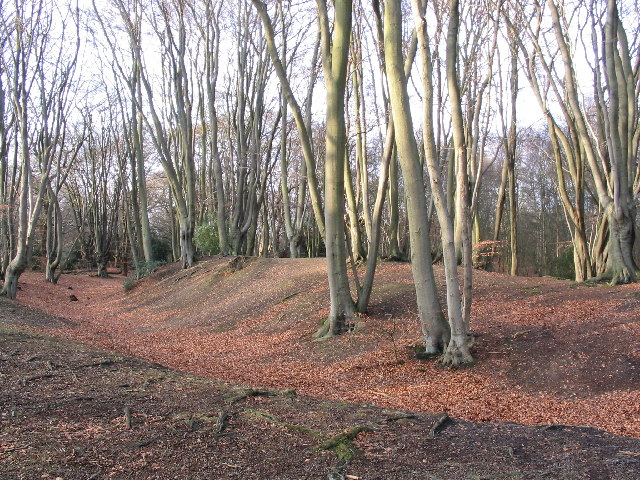
Ambresbury Banks in Epping Forest in January, 2006

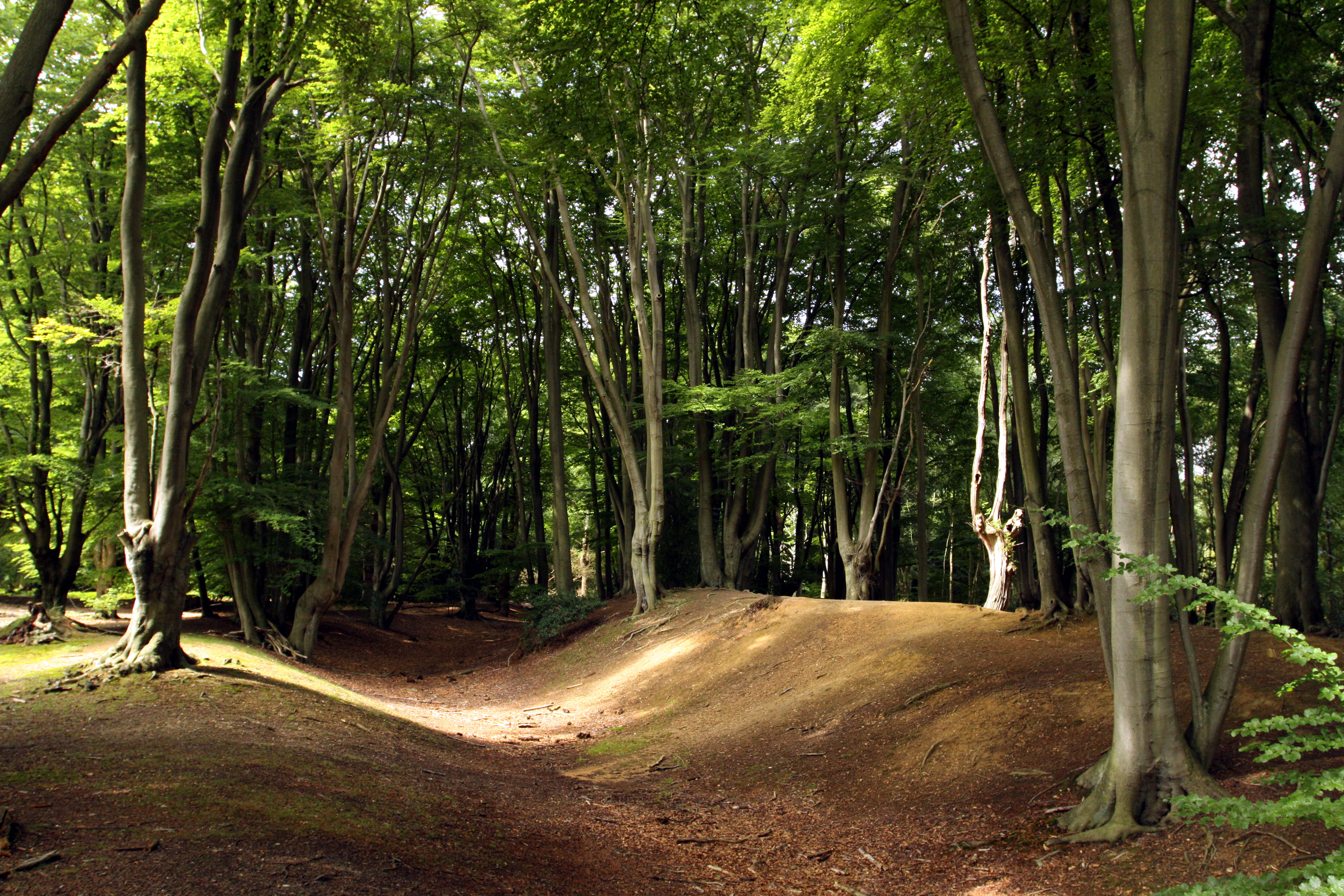
Ambresbury Banks in Epping Forest in August, 2013

Ambresbury Banks is the name given to the remains of an Iron Age hill fort in Epping Forest, Essex, England. It lies in 'Long Running & Ambresbury Banks', south of Bell Common and north of Loughton and its neighbouring hillfort Loughton Camp. It is a Scheduled Monument. Its surrounding forest is a Special Area of Conservation and Site of Special Scientific Interest.

== Investigation ==
The first dig at Ambresbury Banks was initiated by the Essex Field Club in 1881, under general Augustus Pitt Rivers. Another dig under Hazzeldine Warren in 1933 found sherds of pottery. In 1971, 2 Iron Age gold coins were found near the Banks using a metal detector. Flints and an arrowhead have also been found at the site Materials including a clay smoking pipe and a horseshoe have been recovered at the site.

== Description ==
The univallate fort encloses an area of roughly 5 hectares. In the Middle Ages it was "used for quarrying".

== Legend ==
According to legend, it is the site of the last stand by Boudica against the Romans in the year 61. There is no evidence to support this. Another legend contends that the construction and name derive from the fifth-century hero Ambrosius Aurelianus, so contradicting the supposed connection to the first-century battle; other theories for the location of the battlefield include Mancetter in Warwickshire and Kings Cross in London. Nevertheless, Ambresbury Banks forms, along with Loughton Camp, Wallbury Camp, Little Hadham, Barkway and Littlebury, a line of hill-forts that arguably delineate the disputed territories of the warring Trinovantes and Catuvellauni.

== Access to the site ==
In June 2006 Loughton Camp, Loughton Brook, and Ambresbury Banks were "designated as out of bounds to cyclists" due to damage to the sites.
