= Watling Valley Ecumenical Partnership =

Coordinates: 52.039°N 0.799°W

The Watling Valley Ecumenical Partnership is a Local Ecumenical Partnership (LEP) in Milton Keynes, England which belongs to the Church of England, The Baptist Union, the Methodist Church and the United Reformed Church. The Watling Valley is a large area on the western side of Milton Keynes. This area is covered by one Anglican Parish.

== Locations ==
- All Saints, Loughton
- St. Mary's, Shenley
- Holy Cross, Two Mile Ash
- Servant King, Furzton
- St. Giles, Tattenhoe
