= Oxley Mead =

Protected area in Buckinghamshire, England

Coordinates: 52.0056°N 0.8083°W

- Site of Special Scientific Interest
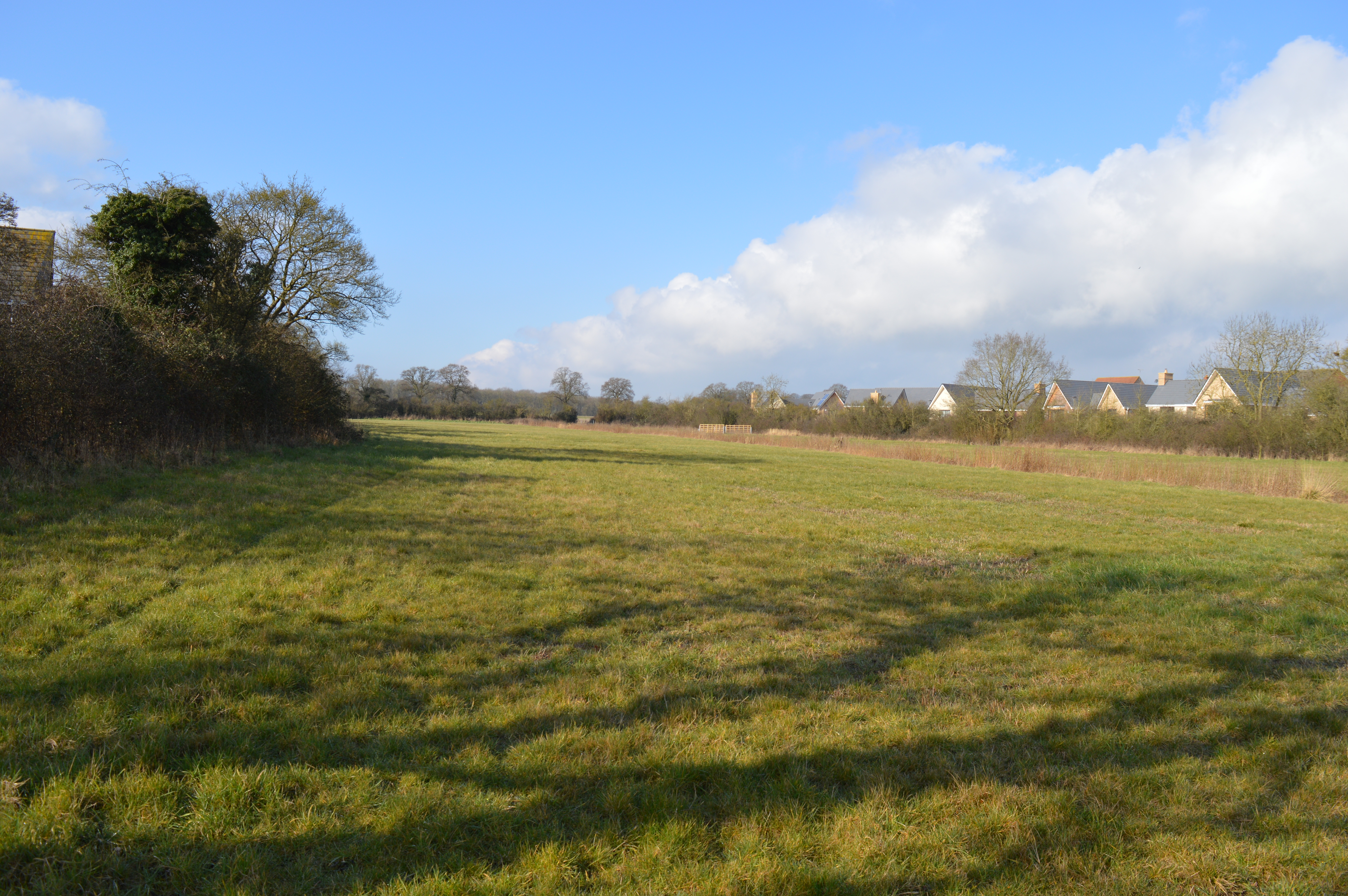
- Location of Oxley Mead.
- Area of search: Buckinghamshire
- Grid reference: SP819348
- Interest: Biological
- Area: 3.7 ha (9.1 acres)
- Notification date: 1994
- Location map: Magic Map

Oxley Mead is a 3.7 hectares (9.1 acres) biological Site of Special Scientific Interest in the Oxley Park district of Shenley Church End in Milton Keynes, (ceremonial) Buckinghamshire.

The site is an ancient hay meadow which has a nationally rare plant community, due to its traditional management, with a hay cut followed by cattle grazing, and no use of fertilisers or herbicides. A stream, which runs through the middle of the field, regularly floods. The main plants are herbs such as great burnet and meadow sweet, and grasses include meadow foxtail and sweet vernal-grass. The meadow is surrounded by hedgerows which have a wide variety of trees and shrubs.

There is access from the end of Raft Way.
