= Shenley, Milton Keynes =

Multi-parish area of Milton Keynes, UK

Coordinates: 52°1′N 0°48′W

Shenley is an area of Buckinghamshire consisting of the villages and areas Shenley Brook End, Shenley Church End, Shenley Dens, Shenley Grounds, Shenley Lodge and Shenley Wood. It is one of the parts of the region that went to make up the new city of Milton Keynes in the 1960s. Shenley is located to the west of the city centre, on the Roman road Watling Street between Stony Stratford and Fenny Stratford.

The name Shenley is an Old English language word meaning "bright clearing". In the Domesday Book of 1086 the area was collectively known as Senelai.

The distinction between the Brook End and the Church End happened in the 12th century when a new manor house was constructed in Shenley Brook End by the Mansell family. However, by 1426 the two manors were owned by the same person and the distinction between the two places was in name only.

== See also ==
- Energy World
- Oxley Park, a modern neighbourhood located on the land of Shenley Common Farm. The name "Shenley Common" has not persisted and evidence for a commonage has not been identified.
