= Shenley Church End =

Civil parish in Milton Keynes, England

Coordinates: 52.022°N 0.788°W

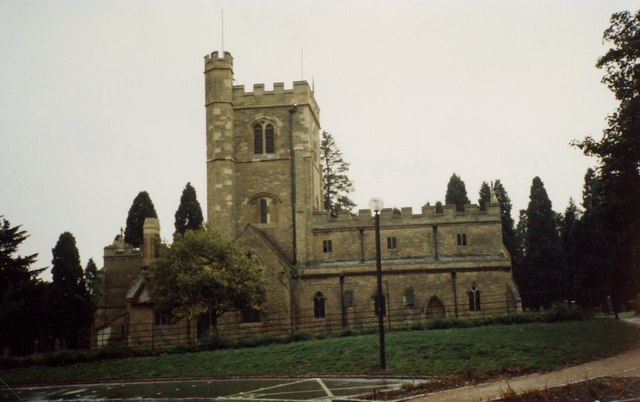
- Church of St. Mary

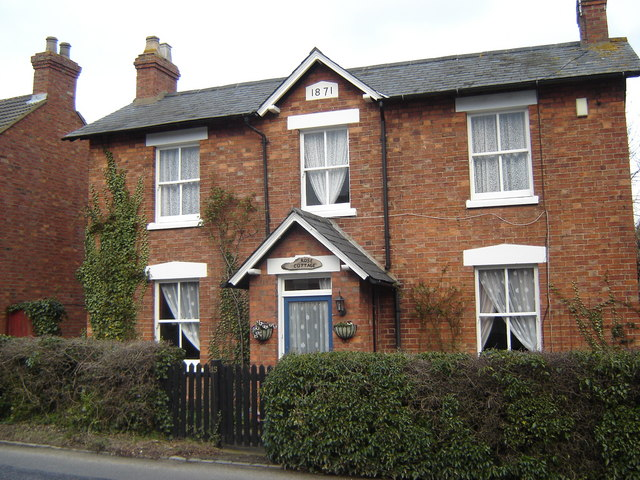
- Rose Cottage

- Location within Buckinghamshire
- Interactive map of Shenley Church End civil parish.
- Population: 14,872 (2021 census)
- OS grid reference: SP832367
- Civil parish: Shenley Church End
- District: City of Milton Keynes
- Unitary authority: Milton Keynes City Council
- Ceremonial county: Buckinghamshire
- Region: South East
- Country: England
- Sovereign state: United Kingdom
- Post town: MILTON KEYNES
- Postcode district: MK5
- Dialling code: 01908
- Police: Thames Valley
- Fire: Buckinghamshire
- Ambulance: South Central
- UK Parliament: Milton Keynes Central

Shenley Church End is a village, district and wider civil parish in Milton Keynes, Buckinghamshire, England, about 2 miles (3.2 km) south-west of Central Milton Keynes, and the same distance north-west of Bletchley. Together with its neighbouring districts of Shenley Brook End, Shenley Wood and Shenley Lodge, the districts are collectively known as "The Shenleys".

== History ==
The village name 'Shenley' is an Old English language word meaning 'bright clearing'. In the Domesday Book of 1086 the area was collectively known as Senelai and controlled by Hugh d'Avranches, 1st Earl of Chester.

The distinction between the Brook End and the Church End happened in the 12th century when a new manor house was constructed in Shenley Brook End by the Mansell family. However, by 1426 the two manors were owned by the same person and the distinction between the two places was in name only.

Shenley Church End is also home to the Shenley Toot, a motte and bailey (of which only the motte remains), which is now a scheduled monument.

The parish church, the Church of St. Mary, is a Grade I listed building. The site of the former manor house near the church is another scheduled monument.

== Education and other services ==
The district contains Denbigh School (a secondary comprehensive), Glastonbury Thorn First School, a nursery in the former village school, and Shenley Church End Pre-School (situated in the Shenley Leisure Centre).

The Leisure Centre beside the secondary school includes a sports hall, gym, squash courts and outdoor football/tennis courts, as well as the Sportsman's Rest bar.

The local retail centre opposite (south of) the school and Leisure Centre is a shopping area consisting of a fish and chip shop, a pharmacy, a cafe, a gym, a barber shop, a bike shop, a bookmaker, a charity shop, a Chinese restaurant, a medical practice and a dental surgery.

In June 2014, Sainsbury's opened new supermarket opposite (east of) the Leisure Centre, on the site of the former Dolphin Splashdown swimming pool.

=== Sport ===
Shenley Church End Cricket Club

The cricket club has been in existence since 1947. Previously known as Rickley Park CC until 1992, the club was renamed after moving from Bletchley to play home matches at Denbigh School, but in 2002 SCECC relocated to the bottom pitch at Manor Fields in Fenny Stratford (where Bletchley Town CC play) – though choosing to retain their current name.

SCECC currently have a Saturday side playing in the Morrant Four Counties Cricket League Division 3 and play friendlies on Sundays.

== Civil parish ==
Today, the historic village is the core of the civil parish that bears its name. The parish is bounded by V3 Fulmer Street, V4 Watling Street, H5 Portway and H6 Childs Way. The parish includes Shenley Hill, Grange Farm, Crownhill, Oakhill/Woodhill, Shenley Wood (including Medbourne), Shenley Church End and Oxley Park.

The parish is bounded to the north-east by V4 Watling Street, to the north-west by the border with Calverton parish, to the south-west by the city boundary with the Buckinghamshire Council unitary authority (at Whaddon) and to the south-east by H6 Childs Way. These are the other neighbourhoods that that comprise the civil parish:

=== Oxley Park and Whitney ===
Oxley Park, primarily a residential area, is relatively young district having been formed via a development framework in 2004. The street naming convention is based on the Silver Screen era of Film, with surnames of film stars forming street names. For example, Audrey Hepburn provides the name of Hepburn Crescent. The development includes Oxley Woods, a nationally notable architecture-led development.

Oxley Mead, a site of special scientific interest, separates Oxley Park from Whitney, a smaller residential development but whose name is used by the Ordnance Survey for both neighbourhoods.

These two neighbourhoods lie on what was once the site of an Iron Age settlement. Both developments lie on the former lands of "Shenley Common Farm". which, in 1771, was farmed by one Isaac Whitney.

=== Medbourne ===
Medbourne is another residential district. It forms part of the grid square that includes Shenley Wood.

=== Grange Farm and Hazeley ===
Grange Farm is another residential district that fills the small grid square defined by H4 Dansteed Way, V2 Tattenhoe Street, H5 Portway and V3 Fulmer Street. The land it occupies was originally a farm of that name.

Hazeley, across Tattenhoe Street from Grange Farm and (as of December 2025) just a fragment of a grid square, is fully taken up by The Hazeley Academy, a state secondary school. (The rest of the hypothetical grid square is occupied by the derelict Shenley Dens Farm.)

=== Crownhill ===
Crownhill is district of both residential and commercial properties. It is also the location of the city crematorium.

=== Oakhill ===
Oakhill is a small residential area of detached houses to the north of the prison site.

=== Woodhill ===
Woodhill is the location of HMP Woodhill and associated developments. At 120 metres (390 ft) above sea level, it occupies the land with highest elevation in Milton Keynes.
