= Loughton Camp =

Hillfort in Essex, England

Coordinates: 51.6588°N 0.04921°E

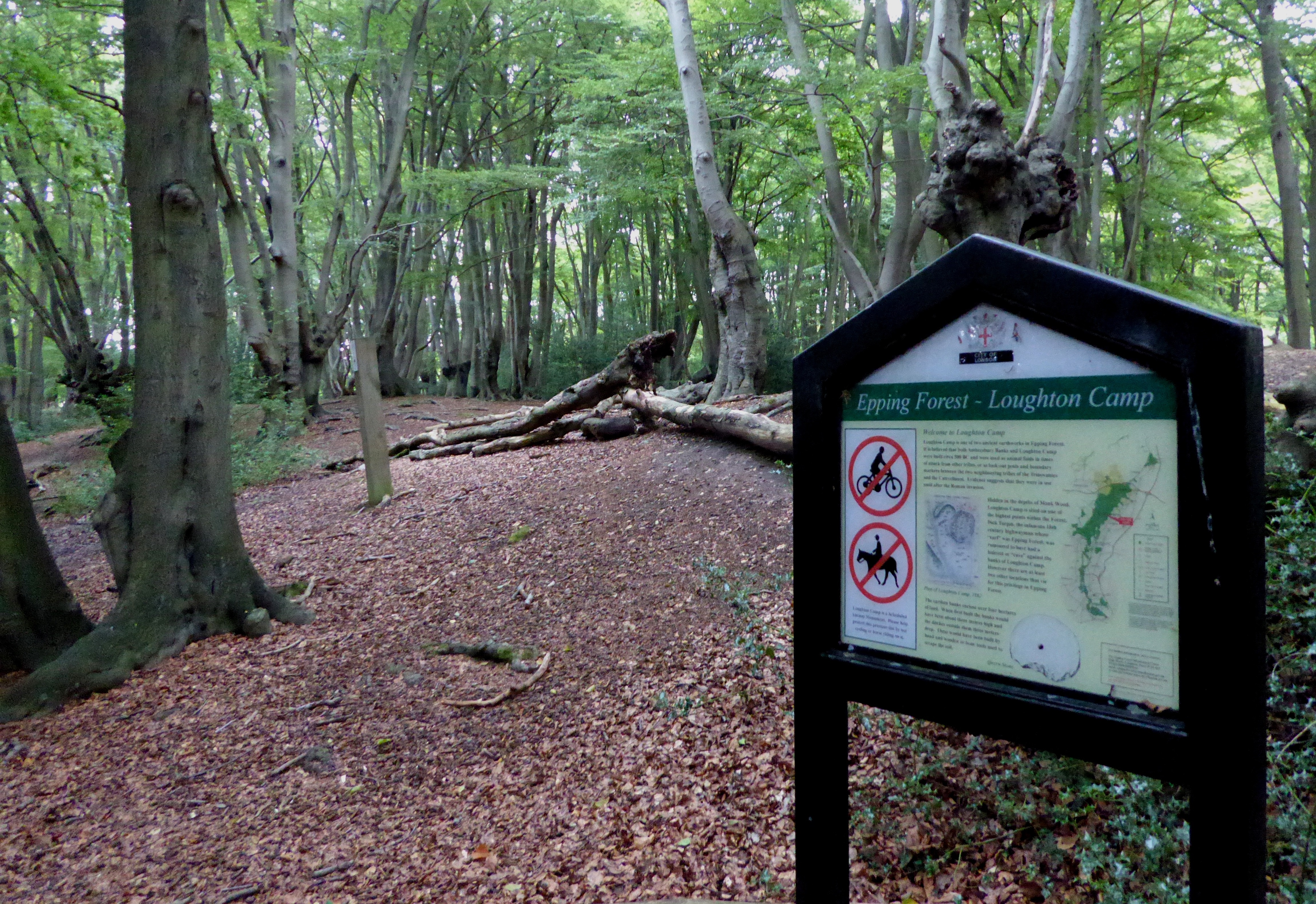
Northwestern bank of the camp with information board

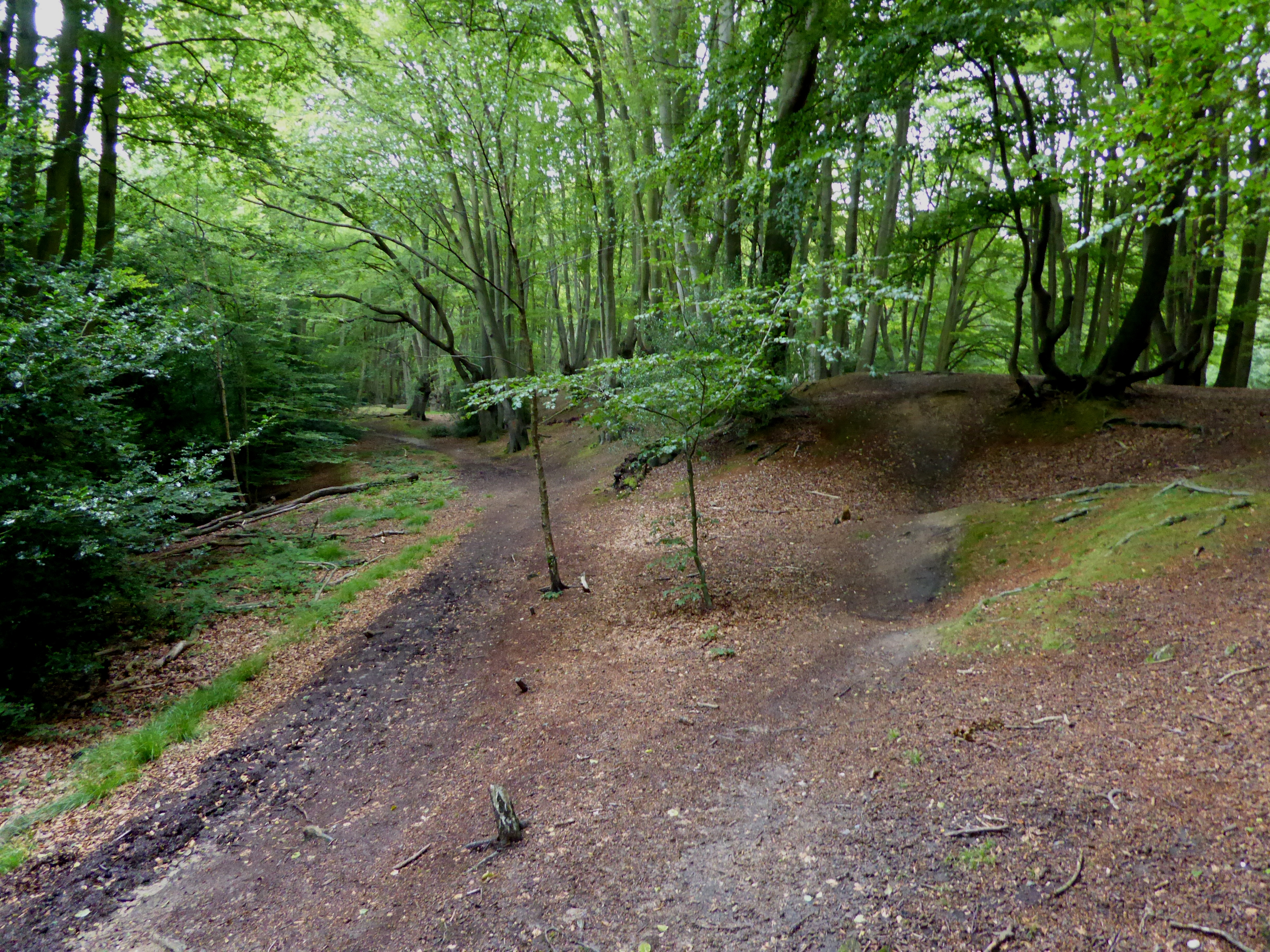
Western bank of the fort

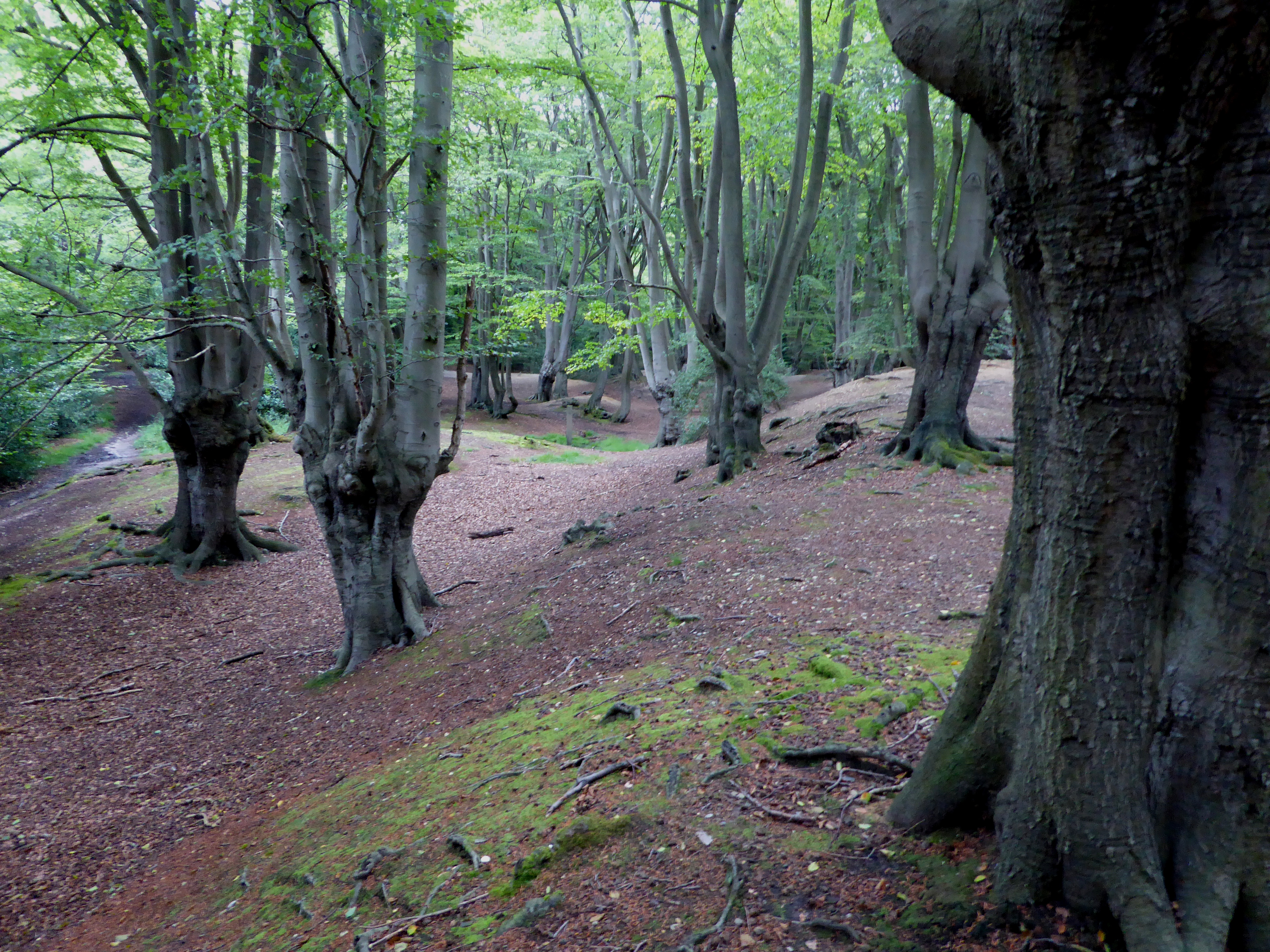
Western bank, with pollarded trees

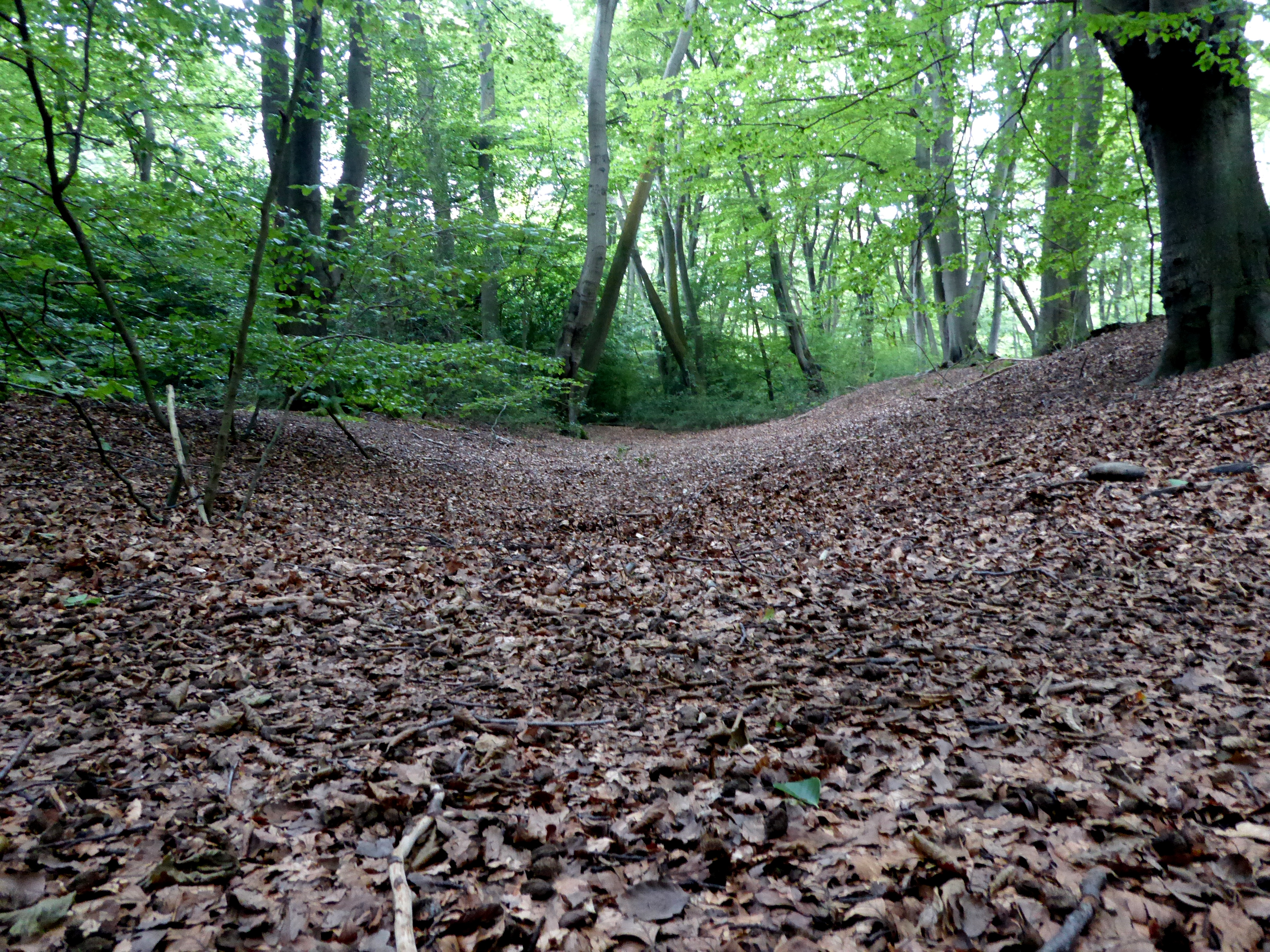
Northeastern ditch

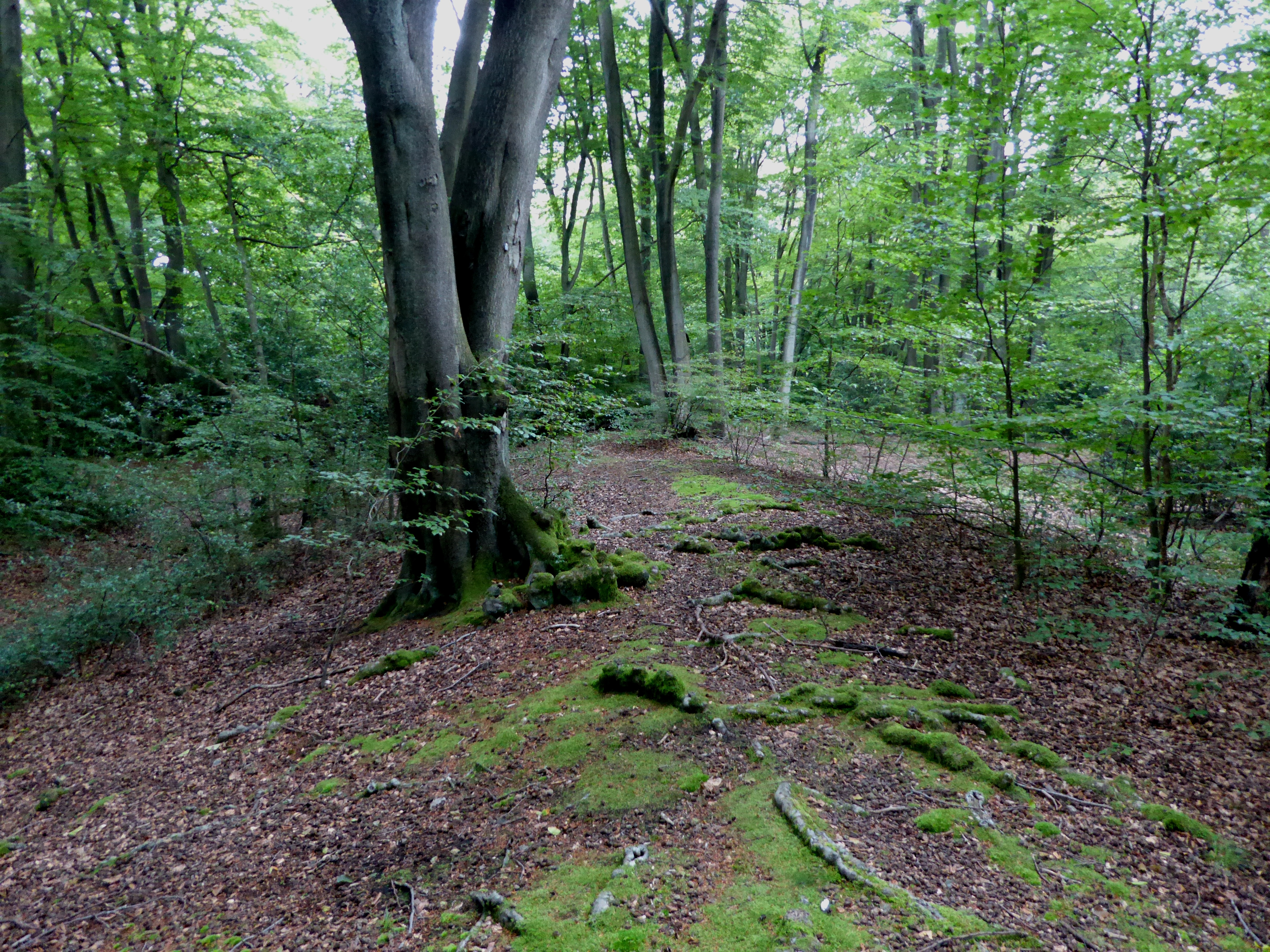
Eastern bank

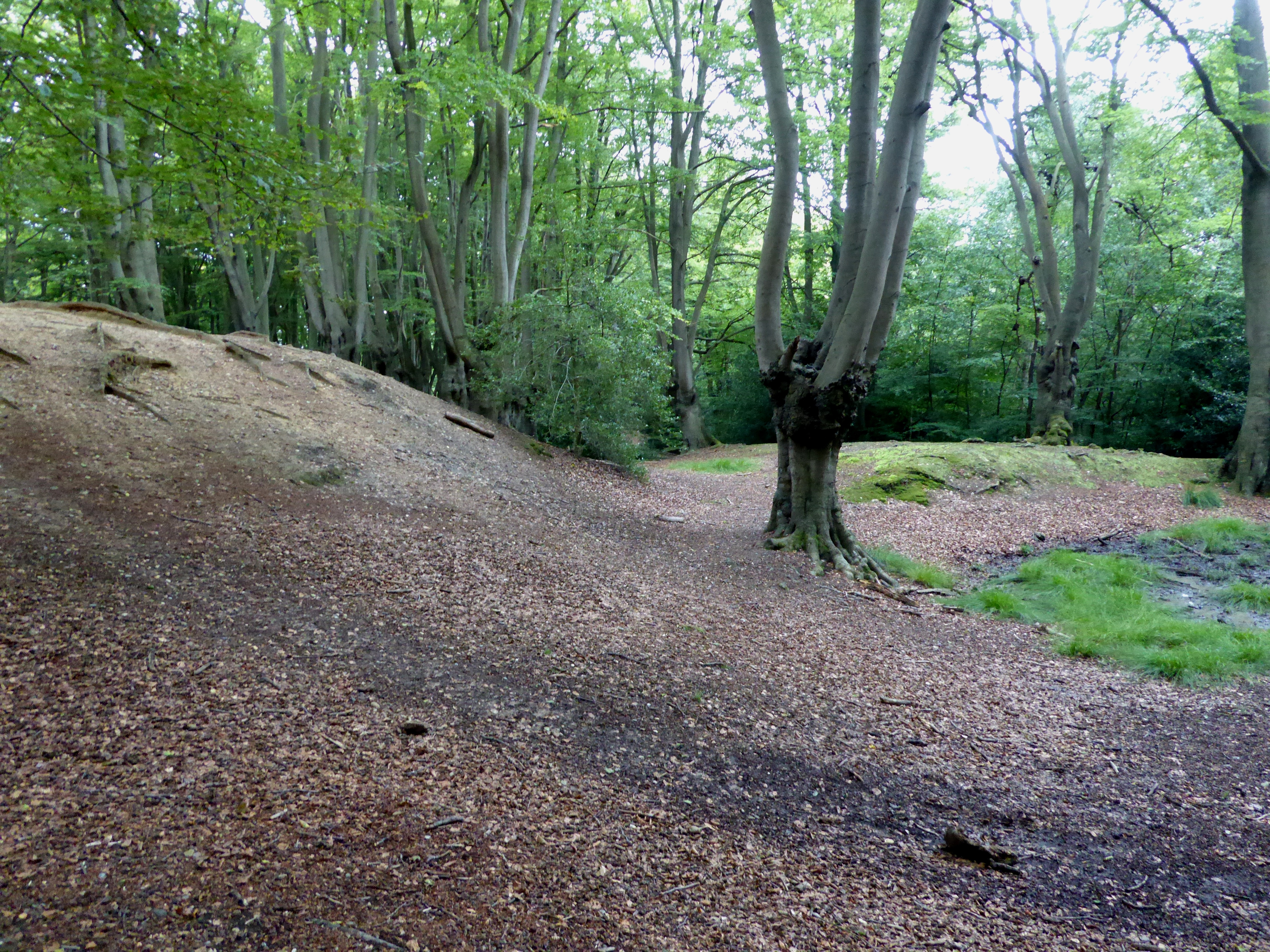
Northwestern ditch and bank

Loughton Camp is an Iron Age (~500 BC) Hill fort in Epping Forest, one mile (1.6 km) northwest of the town of Loughton. It lies "about two miles south-west" of Ambresbury Banks. and south-west of the town of Epping, Essex.

It is a Scheduled Monument. Its surrounding forest is a Special Area of Conservation and Site of Special Scientific Interest.

The camp's earthworks cover an area of approximately 10 acres (4 hectares) and are visible today as a low bank and ditch encircling the main camp. The banks were most probably once a single high rampart, used for defence and the appearance of the ditch suggests it was once very wide and deep in places.

The camp lies on one of the highest points in the surrounding area, on a ridge of high ground, likely to have once been strategic. It is speculated that the camp was used by the Trinovantes in defence against the Catuvellauni. Its elevation suggests that the camp was possibly once a lookout post. However, it may have simply been used as fortification for protection of cattle. A stone Iron Age grain millstone (quern) was found close by. Local legend has it that Boudica used the camp, and that Ambresbury Banks was the site of her defeat in AD61 however "that has been disproved".

The southwestern edge of the camp falls away sharply to an area known as Kate's Cellar (a hermit who reputedly once lived in this area of the forest). An early 19th Century map shows Dick Turpin's hideout here (there are a number of locations within Epping Forest's 6,000 acres (24 km^{2}) which claim the same).

The camp was 'discovered' by Mr Benjamin Harris Cowper in 1872. The first archaeology carried out was by General Pitt-Rivers in 1881. In 1882 the Essex Field Club further excavated the banks. According to T. V. Holmes:

"Many flint flakes, cores, and one implement were discovered, besides many fragments of rude, hand-made pottery, apparently of pre-Roman date."

Roger Nolan, in his Julius Caesar's Invasion of Britain (2018) says there is no doubt that Loughton Camp was the third marching camp used by Caesar in his invasion of 54BC, en route from Kent to the defeat of the British tribes at Wheathampstead (Devil's Dyke). The Loughton site has never been comprehensively excavated; any proof of this might be apparent from such an excavation.

In June 2006 Loughton Camp, Loughton Brook, and Ambresbury Banks were "designated as out of bounds to cyclists" due to damage to the sites.

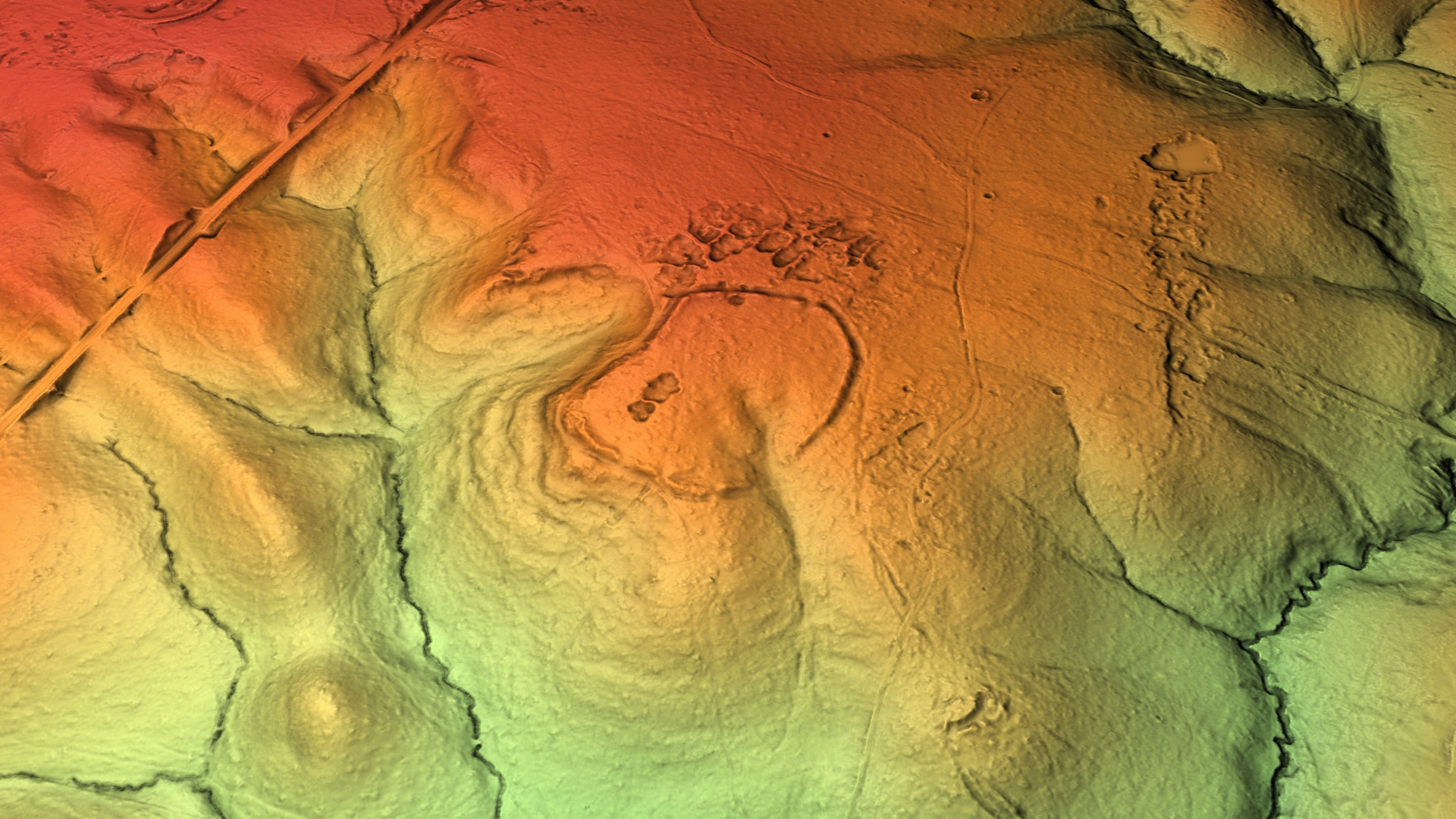
3D view of the digital terrain model
