= Tattenhoe =

Village and neighbourhood of Milton Keynes, England

Coordinates: 51.9973°N 0.7900°W

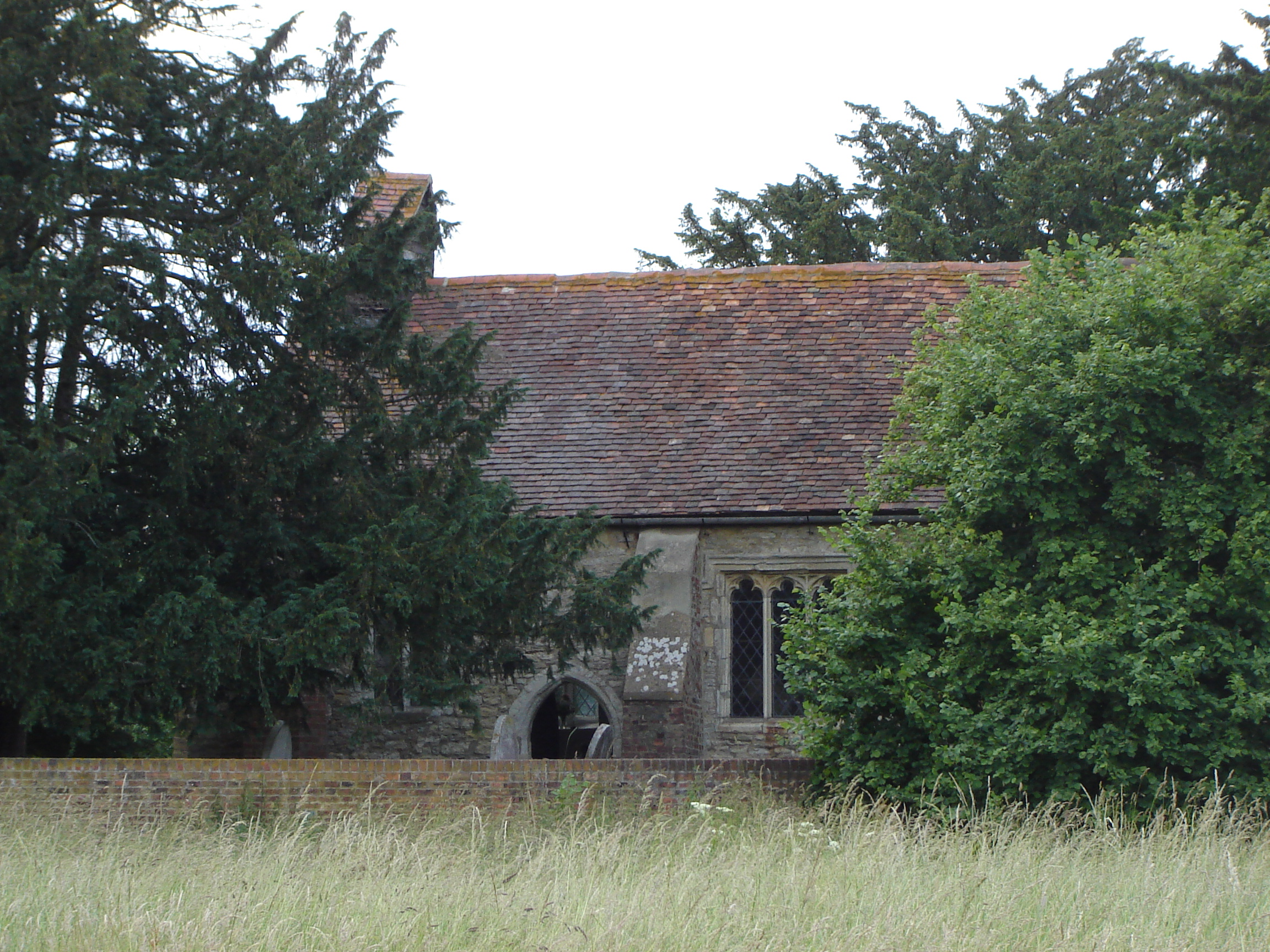
- St. Giles's Church

- Location within Buckinghamshire
- Civil parish: Shenley Brook End
- District: City of Milton Keynes
- Unitary authority: Milton Keynes City Council
- Ceremonial county: Buckinghamshire
- Region: South East
- Country: England
- Sovereign state: United Kingdom

Tattenhoe and Tattenhoe Park are adjacent neighbourhoods of Milton Keynes, Buckinghamshire, England, in the ancient ecclesiastic parish of Tattenhoe. They are located at the south-western edge of the city, next to Whaddon in Aylesbury Vale, not far from the ruins of Snelshall Priory.

== History ==
The name is an Old English language word meaning "Tatta's hill-spur". The village was first recorded (in the 12th century) as 'Thateo'; the village has also been known as Tattenho, Totenho (13th century); Tottynho (16th-17th century); Tattenhall (18th-19th century)

The village was abandoned in the 16th century and had its own moated manor house and church (1540, perhaps 12th century). By the time redevelopment began, it consisted of just three farms and St. Giles's Church, but was recognised as a village (rather than a hamlet) because it had its own ecclesiastical parish. The site of the deserted village is a scheduled monument.

The church is a Grade II* listed building and the monastic fish ponds (near Giles Brook primary school) are classified as another scheduled monument.

== Sports facilities ==
The districts have the Tattenhoe Sports Pavilion. The pavilion has legacy and astroturf playing fields, a meeting room and free parking on site.

== Howe Park Wood ==
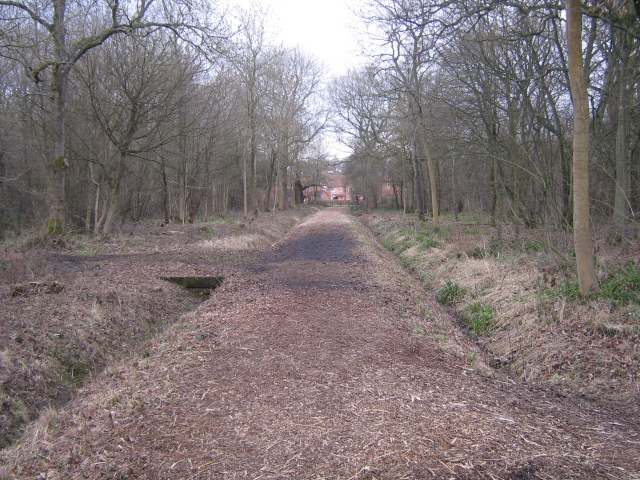
Howe Park Wood, Tattenhoe

The district contains Howe Park Wood, a Site of Special Scientific Interest of about 24 ha (59 acres). It is one of England's few remaining primeval woodlands (though certainly coppiced) and home to a wide variety of wildlife, notably Odonata.

== Civil parish and city council ward ==
Tattenhoe is in the modern civil parish of Shenley Brook End and gives its name to a ward of Milton Keynes City Council. As of May 2022, the Local Councillors for the Tattenhoe Ward are Cllr James Lancaster (Lab), Cllr Manish Verma (Con) and Cllr Shazna Muzammil (Con). As of 2025, for the first time since the Ward's creation, a sitting Councillor became the Mayor of Milton Keynes with Cllr James Lancaster during 2025/26.

In 1971 the civil parish of Tattenhoe had a population of 10. On 1 April 1974 the parish was abolished and merged with Shenley Brook End and Whaddon.
