= Loughton Brook =

Stream in Essex, England

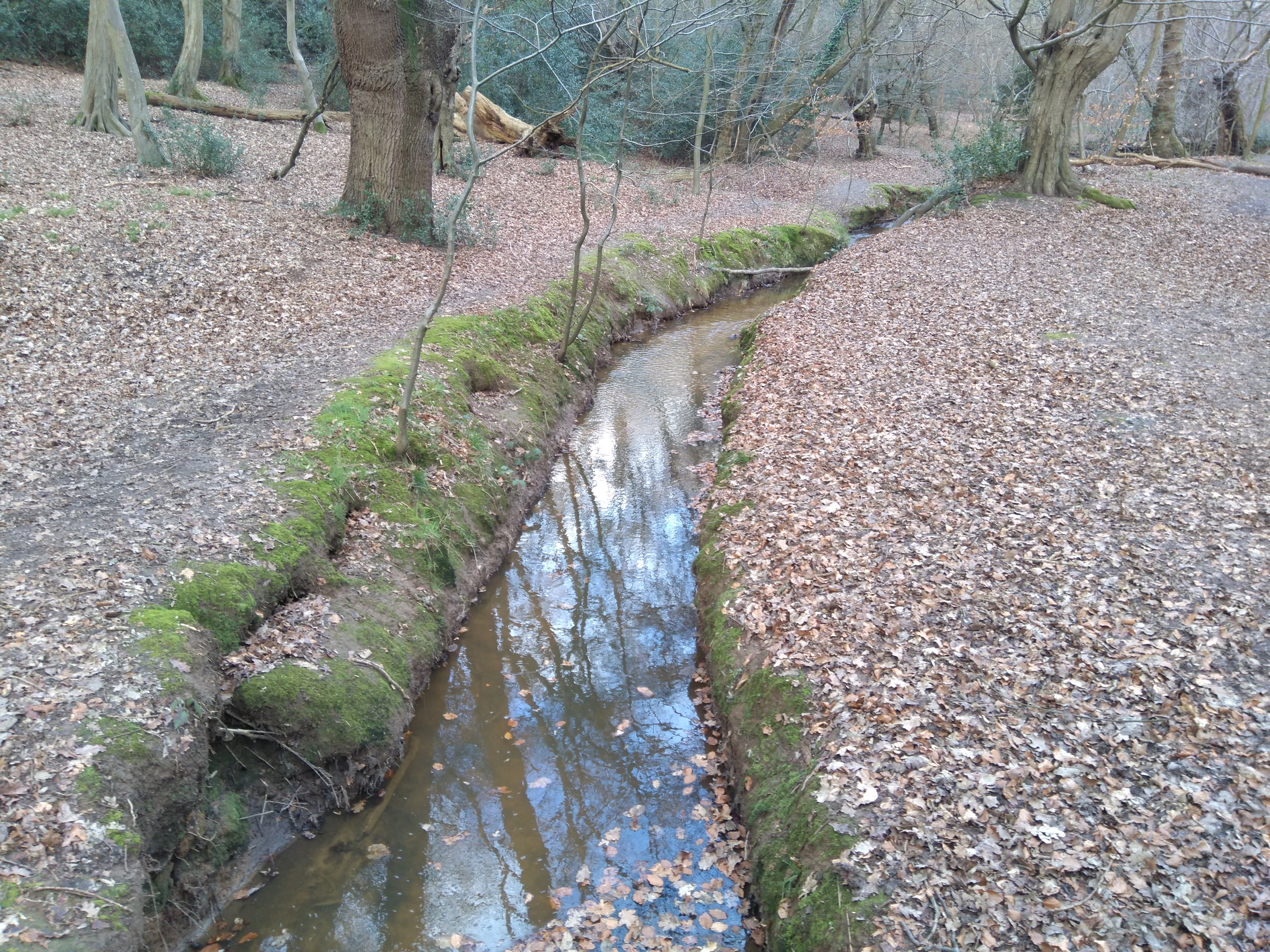
Loughton Brook, Near Staples Road Dam

Loughton Brook is a stream located in Loughton, Essex, United Kingdom. It runs for 4.18 Km from just north of Epping New Road, near Wake Valley Ponds, to the River Roding 200 metres south of South Loughton Cricket Club.

In June 2006 Loughton Camp, Loughton Brook, and Ambresbury Banks were "designated as out of bounds to cyclists" due to damage to the sites.

== Flooding ==
In the past, Loughton Brook has flooded on several occasions, especially around the Loughton High Road/The Drive and Valley Hill/Roding Road junctions. As a result, a flood control dam was constructed just north of Staples Road, and most of the section through Loughton runs underground. Despite this, Loughton Brook still poses a significant flood risk, with several areas (Roding Valley High School, the High Road outside Morrison's and the area around Avondale Road and Malvern Gardens) having flooded previously, and are in flood zone 3, indicating a 1 in a 100 chance of flooding in any given year. However, the brook is unlikely to flood as it did previously due to the construction of the dam at Staples Road. The brook is dammed at three places along its route; at Wake Valley Ponds (next to Epping New Road), at Baldwin's pond, and just north of Staples Road (for flood prevention).

== Cinema ==
A bridge over Loughton Brook was the scene of the Black Knight sequence in the 1975 film Monty Python and the Holy Grail.
