= All Saints Church, Loughton =

Church in Loughton, Milton Keynes, England

Coordinates: 52°1′58.9″N 0°46′49.7″W

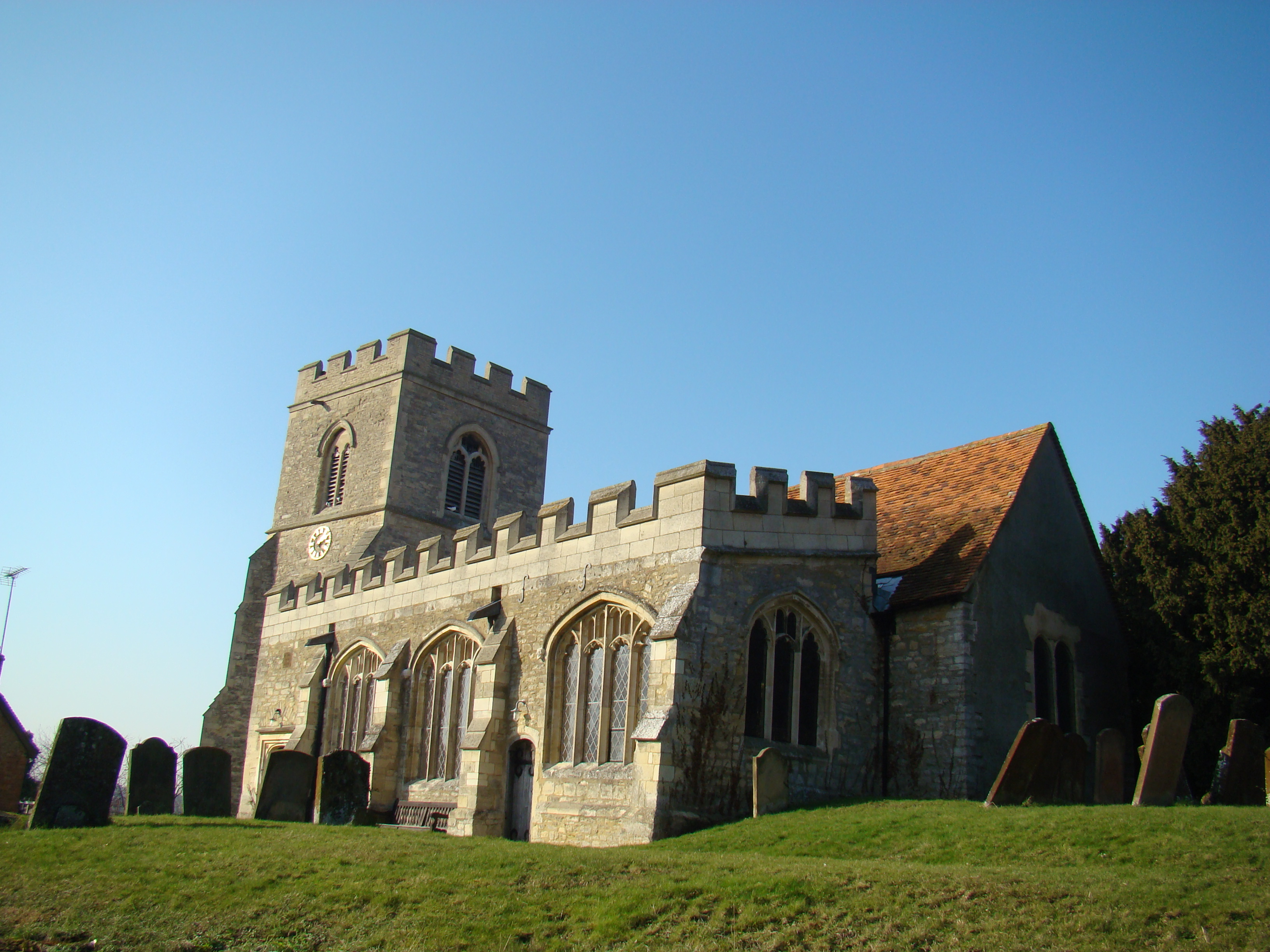
All Saints' Church remains at the centre of a village environment in the Milton Keynes grid square of Loughton.

All Saints' Church is an ecumenical church located in Loughton, Milton Keynes, England.

== Architecture and history ==
A church of Great Loughton was recorded as early as 1219, The present building dates from the early years of the 13th century. There were originally two buildings in two separate parishes – Little and Greater Loughton.

The chancel and nave probably date from the first years of the 13th century, though all the original details have been removed during subsequent alterations. The east window of the chancel, the blocked north doorway of the nave, and the lower part of the window immediately to the west of the latter are probably insertions of about 1250, altered later; but these are the earliest details which now remain. During the latter part of the 15th century the south chapel and aisle, the porch and the tower were added and the nave was reroofed. The fabric was restored about 1700 and again in 1851, while in 1886 the seating was renewed.

The chancel is lit only by its east window, which is of two pointed lights with a round reararch and probably dates from the 13th century, though its head was altered at a much later period. Near the west end of the north wall is a low-side window of one square-headed light, now blocked, and on the south, opening to the chapel, is a pointed arch supported by semi-octagonal responds with moulded capitals and bases. This arch is pierced in the north wall of the chapel, which, in order that it might directly abut the nave arcade, was built against but independently of the chancel wall, the western part of the latter being then entirely removed.

At the north-east of the nave is a late 15th-century three-light window with a four-centred head and modern tracery, and further west are the doorway and window mentioned above, the former being completely blocked. The window, which is a tall single light, appears to have been considerably heightened about 1700. Opposite to this on the south is another tall single-light window which has been similarly treated, but was originally of two lights and probably dates from a century later. The south doorway has a two-centred drop arch, and is of about 1400. Opening to the aisle at the south-east is a late 15th-century arcade of two pointed arches with an octagonal pillar and responds of the same details as the arch on the south side of the chancel. The pointed tower arch on the west, which is pierced through a wall of considerable thickness, is of four moulded orders supported by responds composed of three flat segmental shafts divided by fillets, these shafts having coarsely moulded capitals and plain bases. The chancel has a segmental plastered ceiling, and the nave a low-pitched open-timber roof of the late 15th century.

The south chapel and aisle form one rectangular building, which is lighted from the south by three windows of the late 15th century, each of four cinquefoiled lights with tracery in a four-centred head, and from the east by a three-light window of the same character. Between the easternmost windows of the south wall is a small plain doorway. On the east wall are two brackets with carved heads. The moulded lean-to roof is also of the late 15th century and has carved bosses, one of which bears the arms of Boteler. The porch is of slightly earlier date than the aisle and originally had a gable over the entrance, the outline of which is still visible. It is lighted by a plain square-headed window in the west wall, and has an entrance on the south with a depressed arch in a square head. The walls of the chapel, aisle and porch are crowned by a continuous embattled parapet.

The tower is of three stages surmounted by an embattled parapet. Although the walls are 5 ft. 5 in. thick, and are supported by heavy diagonal buttresses, the structure must have shown signs of weakness soon after its erection, for a strong buttress was placed against the middle of the west wall. This buttress passes through the thickness of the wall, and rises to support the head of the west window, partially blocking it and completely blocking the doorway below. The doorway has a four-centred arch in a square head with traceried spandrels, and its outer mouldings are continuous with those of the window above, so that they form one composition. Two cinquefoiled lights of the window, which originally had a traceried head, are preserved, one on either side of the buttress. The second stage is lighted from the south by a small window with two quatrefoils arranged vertically, and the bell-chamber has on each side a restored window of two trefoiled lights under a pointed head.

The plain octagonal font probably dates from about 1700. On the chancel floor there is a half-length brass of a priest in mass vestments, with the inscription Hic jacet Hugo Parke quondam istius ecclie Rector in artibus magister sacreque theologie bacularius. Hugh Park died in 1514. On the north wall of the chancel are monuments with arms to Mary (Tresham) wife of John Crane of Loughton (d. 1624), and to Felice [(Phyllis) Moorton], wife first of William Mortoft of Itteringham, and secondly of John Crane of London (d. 1622). On the south wall is a monument to Robert Crane, D.C.L., Fellow of Trinity College, Cambridge (d. 1672), and his father John Crane of Loughton (d. 1660). On the chancel floor are slabs to all of the above, that to Felice Crane having a brass inscription.

In the tower is a large iron-bound poor-box dating probably from the late 16th century, with two holes for money, and in the south chapel are two grotesquely carved wood panels, while some fragments of old glass, mounted in a frame, are placed on the north wall of the nave. At the east end of the chancel is a painting by Gonzales of Christ and the two disciples at the supper at Emmaus. This picture was given to the church by the Rev. John Athawes on his induction to the living in 1833.

The tower contains a ring of six bells: the treble and second are modern; the third is by Robert Atton, 1631; the fourth, inscribed, Hic Nova Campana Margareta Est Nominata, and the fifth, Sit Nomen Domini Benedictum, are both by Henry Jordan, about 1460; and the tenor is by Bartholomew Atton, 1590.

== Trivia ==
In 1378, the curate/parson, William Capel de Sapcote of Little Loughton was found dead on the highway. An inquest found that the priest of Great Loughton, John Gervyes, had killed him with an arrow worth 1d. The value of the bow and arrow was 14d, and 'Great Loughton' was fined by that amount. In 1408, Little and Great Loughton were merged to form the present parish.

== The church today ==
The church recently refurbished the flooring and seating, allowing the main part of the church to be used for a wider variety of activities. In addition to the church itself, there is also an adjoining room that is used by the children's Sunday club during services and for the serving of refreshments after services. The church and the adjoining room are also available for hire by local groups and businesses.

The church is part of the Watling Valley Ecumenical Partnership.
