= Places of interest in Buckinghamshire =

Buckinghamshire, England is most notable for its open countryside and natural features, including the Chiltern Hills Area of Outstanding Natural Beauty and the River Thames. The county is also home to many historic houses, some of which are open to the public through the National Trust, such as Waddesdon Manor, West Wycombe Park and Cliveden; and others which still act as private houses such as the Prime Minister's country retreat Chequers.

Buckinghamshire is also the home of various notable people from history in whose honour tourist attractions have been established. The most notable of these is the author Roald Dahl who included many local features and characters in his works.

There are various notable sports facilities in Buckinghamshire such as Adams Park, and the county is also home to the world-famous Pinewood Studios.

This is a list of places of interest in the county. See List of places in Buckinghamshire for a list of settlements.

== Places of interest ==
Key
	Abbey/Priory/Cathedral
Accessible open space	Accessible open space
	Amusement/Theme Park
	Castle
Country Park	Country Park
	English Heritage
	Forestry Commission
Heritage railway	Heritage railway
Historic house	Historic House
Places of Worship	Places of Worship
Museum (free) Museum	Museum (free/not free)
National Trust	National Trust
	Theatre
	Zoo

- The Abbey, Aston Abbotts
- Amersham Museum
- Ascott
- Ashridge Estate
- Bekonscot
- Bernwood Forest
- Black Park
- Bletchley Park
- Blue Lagoon Local Nature Reserve
- Boarstall Duck Decoy
- Boarstall Tower
- Bradenham Village
- Bradwell Abbey
- Brill Windmill
- Buckingham Chantry Chapel
- Buckinghamshire County Museum
- Buckinghamshire Railway Centre in Quainton
- Bulstrode Park
- Chequers Court
- Chesham Museum
- Chicheley Hall
- Chiltern Open Air Museum
- Chiltern scarp
- Chinnor & Princes Risborough Railway
- Claydon House
- Cliveden
- Concrete Cows
- Coombe Hill
- The Cowper and Newton Museum
- Dorney Lake
- Dorneywood
- Emberton Country Park
- Eythrope
- Halton House
- Hampden House
- Hartwell House
- Hospital of St John the Baptist
- Hughenden Manor
- Ivinghoe Beacon
- Kederminster Library
- The King's Head Inn, Aylesbury
- Linford Manor
- Little Britain
- Long Crendon Courthouse
- Mentmore Towers
- Milton Keynes Museum
- Milton Keynes Peace Pagoda
- Pitstone Windmill
- Princes Risborough Manor House
- Roald Dahl Children's Gallery
- Roald Dahl Museum and Story Centre
- Shardeloes
- Snelshall Priory
- Stowe Park
- Waddesdon Manor
- West Wycombe Caves
- West Wycombe Park
- West Wycombe Village
- Whiteleaf Cross
- Winslow Hall
- Wycombe Abbey
