= List of museums in Buckinghamshire =

This list of museums in Buckinghamshire, England contains museums which are defined for this context as institutions (including nonprofit organizations, government entities, and private businesses) that collect and care for objects of cultural, artistic, scientific, or historical interest and make their collections or related exhibits available for public viewing. Also included are non-profit art galleries and university art galleries. Museums that exist only in cyberspace (i.e., virtual museums) are not included.

Name	Image	Town/City	Type	Summary
Amersham Museum		Amersham	Local	Local history, culture, toys, fossils, archaeology, garden
Ascott House		Ascott	Historic house	Operated by the National Trust, half-timbered Jacobean farmhouse, transformed by the de Rothschild family towards the end of the 19th century, features collection of paintings, fine furniture and superb oriental porcelain, gardens
Bletchley Park		Bletchley (Milton Keynes)	Military	Site of the United Kingdom's main decryption establishment in World War II, also includes National Museum of Computing, exhibits of toys, Winston Churchill, vintage cinema equipment, automobiles, 1940s secret post office
Boarstall Tower		Boarstall	Historic house	Operated by the National Trust, 14th-century moated gatehouse and gardens
Buckingham Old Gaol		Buckingham	Local	Local history, culture, rural life, prison cells, Royal Buckinghamshire Yeomanry
Buckinghamshire County Museum		Aylesbury	Multiple	Local history, art, geology, costume, agriculture and industry. The museum includes the Roald Dahl Children's Gallery which uses characters and themes from Roald Dahl's books to stimulate children's interest in science, history and literature
Buckinghamshire Railway Centre		Quainton	Railway	Includes vintage steam and diesel locomotives
Chenies Manor House		Chenies	Historic house	Tudor manor house and gardens
Chesham Museum		Chesham	Local	Local history, culture, industry
Chiltern Open Air Museum		Chalfont St Giles	Open-air	Includes over 30 buildings
Claydon House		Middle Claydon	Historic house	Operated by the National Trust, 18th century rococo manor house and parkland
Cliveden		Taplow	Historic house	Operated by the National Trust, part is open for tours, gardens with sculpture
Cowper & Newton Museum		Olney	Multiple	Home of 18th-century poet William Cowper, local history exhibits, lace, and preacher John Newton
Dorney Court		Dorney	Historic house	Early Tudor manor house and gardens
Haddenham Museum		Haddenham	Local	Local history, culture, farming, industry
High Wycombe Chair Making Museum		High Wycombe		History of chair-making
King's Head Inn, Aylesbury		Aylesbury	Historic house	Operated by the National Trust, medieval coaching inn
Long Crendon Courthouse		Aylesbury	Historic house	Operated by the National Trust, 15th-century two-story timber frame building
Milton's Cottage		Chalfont St Giles	Historic house	Home of 17th-century poet John Milton
Milton Keynes Museum		Milton Keynes	Local	Local history, culture, agriculture, memorabilia of the Wolverton railway works, historic telephones and switchboards, Post Office and British Telecom vehicles
MK Gallery		Milton Keynes	Art	website, contemporary art
National Museum of Computing		Bletchley (Milton Keynes)	Technology	Located at Bletchley Park, historic computer systems
Nether Winchendon House		Nether Winchendon	Historic house	Grand medieval manor house
Pitstone Green Museum		Pitstone	History	website, exhibits include farming, country life, trades and professions, model railways, engines, vintage wireless equipment, photographic and electrical apparatus, WWII military aviation
Pitstone Windmill		Pitstone	Mill	Operated by the National Trust, corn grinding windmill
Quainton Windmill		Quainton	Mill	Early 19th-century tower mill
Roald Dahl Museum and Story Centre		Great Missenden	Biographical	Home of children's author Roald Dahl
Stowe House		Stowe	Historic house	Operated by the National Trust, 18th century palatial house
Trenchard Museum		Halton	Military history museum	Operated by RAF Halton
Waddesdon Manor		Waddesdon	Historic house	Operated by the National Trust, 19th-century mansion owned by the de Rothschild family, features French 18th century decorative arts, English portraits, Dutch Golden Age paintings, 18th century books, drawings, textiles, 16th century limoges, enamel, majolica, silver
West Wycombe Park		West Wycombe	Historic house	Operated by the National Trust, Italianate decorated mansion and gardens
Wycombe Museum		High Wycombe	Local	Local history, culture, chair-making and area furniture industry, displays of Windsor chairs, lace, and natural history

== See also ==
- Category:Tourist attractions in Buckinghamshire
