= List of windmills in Buckinghamshire =

Extant windmills in Buckinghamshire.
1 Brill, 2 Cholesbury 3, Cobstone, 4 Coleshill, 5 Lacey Green, 6 New Bradwell, 7 Pitstone, 8 Quainton, 8 Caldecotte

A list of windmills in Buckinghamshire, UK.

== Locations ==
Location	Name of mill and grid reference	Type	Maps	First mention or built	Last mention or demise	Photograph
Aylesbury	Walton Green			1798	1798	
Aylesbury	Walton Green (2nd mill)			1798	1798	
Aylesbury	Bierton Road Mill		1788	1788	1788	
Beaconsfield		Tower		1811	1968, collapsed by 1976	
Bledlow Ridge	Bledlow Ridge Mill	Post		1798	Dismantled 1933	
Brill				1286	1286	
Brill				1345	1345	
Brill	Brill Windmill; Nixey's Mill; SP 652 142	Post	1788	1668	Windmill World	
Brill	Parson's Mill		1788	1788	Demolished 1906	
Brill	(3rd mill)			1798	1798	
Chalfont St Giles			1788	1788	1788	
Chalfont St Peter	Astingwood		1788	1788	1788	
Chesham		Smock		c. 1650	Moved to Lacey Green, 1821	
Cholesbury	Hawridge Mill; Cholesbury Mill	Smock		1863	Demolished 1884	
Cholesbury	Cholesbury Mill; SP 935 069	Tower		1884	Windmill World	
Coleshill	Grove's Mill; SU 948 948	Tower		1856	Windmill World	
Cuddington		Post		18th century	Demolished 1925	
Dynton			1788	1788	1788	
Edlesborough			1788	1788	1788	
Edlesborough	SP 982 192	tower		Early 19th century	Windmill World	
Farnham Royal				1798	1798	
Fulmer		Tower		19th century		
Great Horwood		Tower		1864	Demolished c. 1940	
Great Horwood	Singleborough Mill		1830	1830	1830	
Great Linford				1220	1220	
Great Missenden		Post	1788	1788	Burnt down c. 1876	
Grove			1788	1788	1798	
Haddenham		Post	1788	1788	1918	
Haddenham	Old Mill	Post			Burnt down 14 October 1877.	
Haddenham		Tower		1878	Demolished 1930s	
Hartwell				1798	1798	
Hillesden				1899 (OS Map)	1959 (OS Map)	
Hulcott			1788	1788	1798	
Ibstone				1633	1633	
Ibstone	Cobstone Windmill; SU 769 915	Smock		1816	Windmill World	
Ickford			1788	1788	1788	
Lacey Green	Lacey Green Windmill; SP 819 008	Smock		1821	Windmill World	
Little Missenden (Holmer Green)		Tower		c. 1829	Collapsed 1929	
Long Crendon				1297	1297	
Long Crendon		Post	1788	1788	Demolished 1931	
Long Crendon	Chilton Road Mill	Tower		1864	Demolished 1925	
Mursley		Post	1788	1788	Burnt down c. 1895	
New Bradwell	New Bradwell Windmill; SP 831 411	Tower		1805	Windmill World	
North Crawley			1834	1798	1834	
North Crawley			1834	1798	1834	
North Marston	SP 775 228	Smock	1788	1788	1864; Windmill World	
Padbury			1788	1788	1864	
Pitstone	Pitstone Windmill; SP 945 157	Post	1788	1627, roundhouse built 1895	Windmill World	
Prestwood				19th century	19th century	
Princes Risborough				1798	1798	
Quainton	Banner Mill; SP 746 203	Tower		1832	Windmill World	
Radnage			1788	1788	1788	
Stantonbury		Tower			1907	
Stewkley		Smock		1839	1930	
Stewkley				1883	1883	
Stokenchurch		Post	1788	1736	Blown down 1935	
Stoke Mandeville			1788	1788	1788	
Stone				1801	1914	
Swanbourne				13th century	13th century	
Thornborough	SP 737 352	Tower		1840s	Windmill World	
Towersey			1788	1788	1798	
Turweston			1798	1796	1798	
Twyford		Tower	1788	1788	1798	
Twyford		Tower		19th century	1935	
Waddesdon		Tower		1835	1930	
Wendover	SP 873 082	Tower	1788	1788	Converted to house in 1930s; Windmill World	
Wexham	SU 995 844	Tower			Windmill World	
Whitchurch				1776	1864	
Wing			1788	1788	Demolished c. 1798	
Winslow	(five mills)				All burnt down in 1760	

Mock mill

Location	Name of mill	Type	Maps	First mention or built	Last mention or demise	Photograph
Milton Keynes	Caldecotte Mill	Tower		1990	Built as a pub and restaurant	

== Sources ==
Unless stated otherwise, the source for all entries is Vince, John (1976). Windmills in Buckinghamshire and the Chilterns. Thames Ditton: Format Publishing. ISBN 0-905759-00-1.

== Maps ==
- 1788 Thomas Jeffrey
- 1834 Ordnance Survey

== Notes ==
Mills in bold are still standing, known building dates are indicated in bold. Text in italics denotes indicates that the information is not confirmed, but is likely to be the case stated.
