= St Mary's Church, Old Amersham =

St Mary's Church
- Parish Church of Amersham
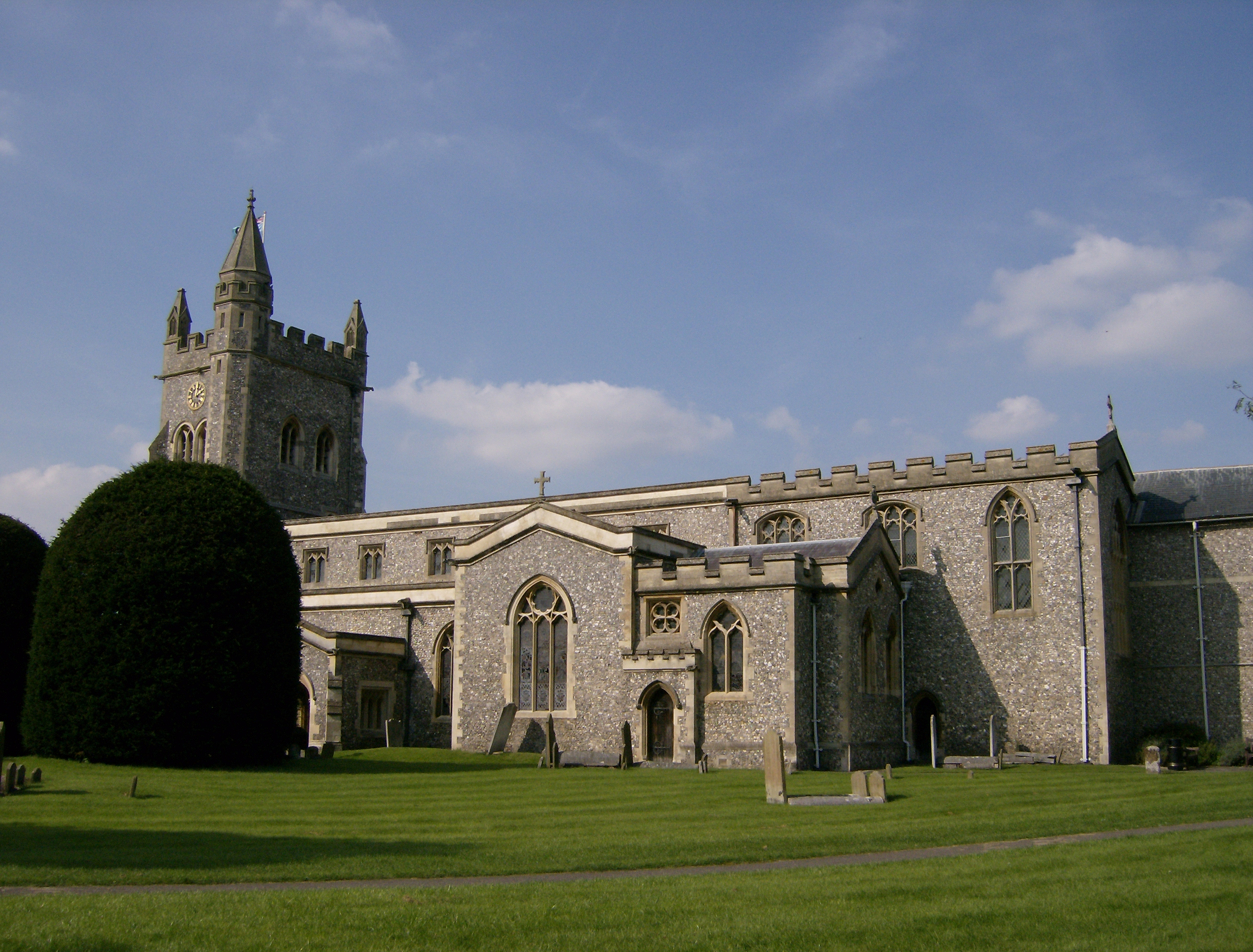
- View of the church from the south.

- Location of St Mary's Church
- 51.6670°N 0.6161°W
- Location: Amersham, Buckinghamshire
- Country: England
- Denomination: Church of England
- Website: amershamwithcoleshillparish.org.uk

History
- Founded: c. 1140
- Dedication: St Mary the Virgin

Architecture
- Style: English Gothic
- Years built: 13th, 14th centuries

Administration
- Province: Canterbury
- Diocese: Oxford
- Archdeaconry: Buckingham
- Deanery: Amersham
- Benefice: Amersham
- Parish: Amersham

St Mary's Church is a Church of England parish in Old Amersham, Buckinghamshire, England. The church is a grade I listed building.

== History ==
The site of St Mary's Church has had Christian associations for many centuries. Early missionary monks of St Augustine and St Birinus travelled via the Roman Road Akeman Street, converting the local population to Christianity and baptising them in the River Misbourne. A place of worship has existed on this site since around 1140 A.D. The present church dates from the 13th century with additions in the 14th and 15th centuries, when the church was extended.

The parish has connections with the persecution of the Lollards in the early 1500s when a group of locals known as the Amersham Martyrs were burned at the stake on the hill overlooking the old town. The Amersham Martyrs Memorial was placed on a hill overlooking the church in 1931. In 1553, Scottish reformer John Knox preached his last sermon at Amersham before going into exile to flee the wrath of Queen Mary.

The patrons of the parish are the Drake family, the Lords of the Manor of Amersham, related to Sir Francis Drake. Around 1637, Sir William Drake purchased the Borough of Amersham from the Earl of Bedford. There are numerous memorials to Drake family members in St Mary's Church.

Several descendants of the Drakes have served as rector of the parish, including Rev. Edward Drake, who commissioned a major restoration of the church in 1890, and the external appearance dates from this time.

The bells are still rung in the church tower.

On 22 December 1958, the church was designated a grade I listed building.

=== Present day ===
The Church of England parish of Amersham is part of the Archdeaconry of Buckingham in the Diocese of Oxford.

== Notable burials ==
The body of the murderer Ruth Ellis was reburied in the churchyard extension of St Mary's Church. The headstone in the churchyard was inscribed "Ruth Hornby 1926–1955". Her son, Andy, destroyed the headstone shortly before he died by suicide in 1982.

In 2024 the funeral of Liam Payne, former member of boyband One Direction, was held at the church. He had lived nearby in Chalfont St Giles.

== Gallery ==
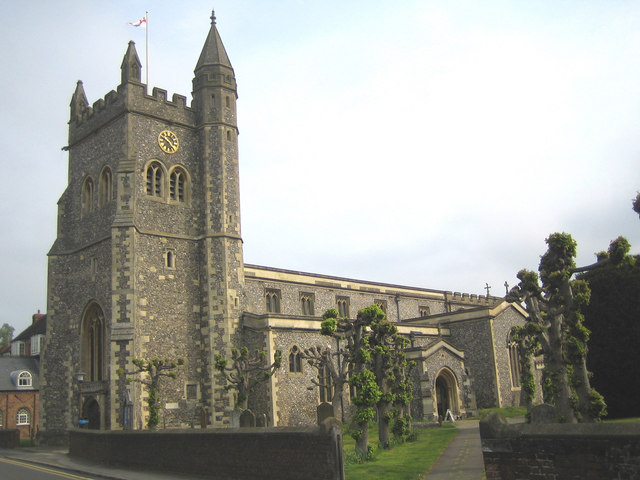
View of the church from the southwest.

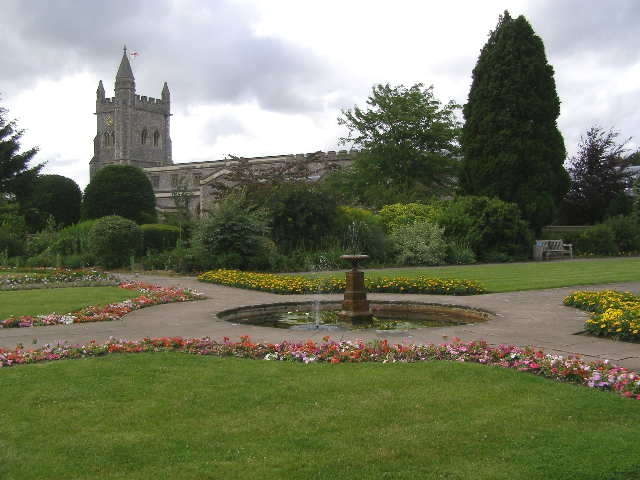
View of the gardens to the south of the church.

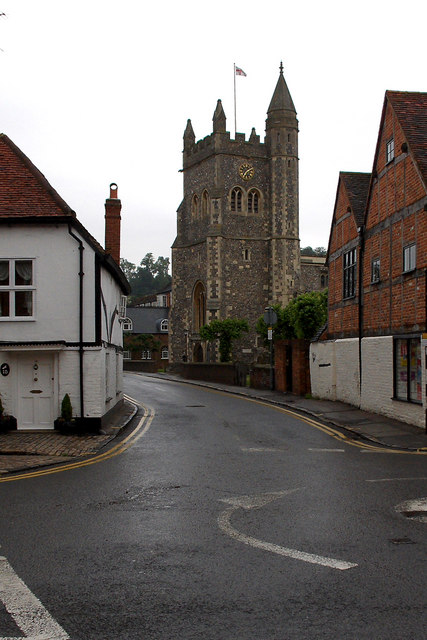
The church tower from Church Street.

== See also ==
- Amersham Museum, also in Old Amersham
