= Hilda Mary Woods =

British statistician

- Born: 1892; Doddershall, Quainton, Buckinghamshire, England
- Died: 1971 (aged 78–79)
- Education: Aberdeen University
- Spouse: Roger Fowke (m.1934, died 1934)
- Scientific career
- Workplaces: MRC Biostatistics Unit, Cambridge

Hilda Mary Woods (1892–1971) MBE, was a British statistician who began work in 1916 at the Medical Research Council's Statistical Research Unit with Major Greenwood ("Major" being his forename, not a military rank). Subsequently, she would deputize for him in his Directorship of the Unit, where in 1931 Woods and her co-author William Russell published an early textbook on medical statistics (Introduction to Medical Statistics, reprinted in 1936 and 1948). Their practical text was based on lectures given at the London School of Hygiene and Tropical Medicine (LSHTM), as referenced in Hill's 1937 Lancet articles and subsequent seminal text, The Principles of Medical Statistics.

Woods was appointed MBE for the statistical work she did in Ceylon where her newlywed husband died from septicaemia barely two months after their marriage. From Ceylon, Woods travelled to Africa, where, upon the death of her sister-in-law and later of her brother, she assumed the sole guardianship of her niece and adopted daughter, Rosemary Gear.

== Early life and education ==
Hilda Mary Woods was born in 1892 in Doddershall, Quainton, Buckinghamshire, England, the daughter of William Ashburnham Woods, a farmer, and Mary Ann Woods (née Markham). She was the eldest daughter in a family of five surviving children: three boys and two girls.

Her early education was provided by a governess at home and included learning to play the piano. At age 12 she was sent to the private Northampton High School as a boarder. There she obtained her Junior Oxford and Cambridge Certificate and several music certificates.

In June 1916, she had wandered along Whitehall in search of work and willing to accept anything. Finally she came to a door in Whitehall Gardens marked Ministry of Munitions and filled in a form and was interviewed. She was asked: "Are you any good at mathematics? There is a doctor in the Welfare Section who wants an educated person to travel round and get statistics from factories. You look too young tho’. What age are you?" Woods promptly added three years to her age and the appointment was made.

== Career ==
From 1916 until 1933, Woods worked alongside Major Greenwood, chair of Epidemiology and Vital Statistics at the London School of Hygiene and Tropical Medicine. Greenwood was an important figure in the development of epidemiology in Britain.

Woods was initially employed until the end of 1919 to work with Greenwood on ‘A report on the incidence of industrial accidents upon individuals with special reference to multiple accidents’, which was highly cited. In 1926, she was elected a fellow in the Royal Statistical Society.

In February 1928, Greenwood and Woods transferred to the Division of Epidemiology and Vital Statistics at the LSHTM. Woods was appointed as Assistant Lecturer on the permanent staff of the University of London, the first female lecturer at the LSHTM. As well as giving lectures on epidemiology and vital statistics to medical postgraduates taking the Diploma in Public Health course, she had responsibility for the practical classes. Together with her statistician colleague, William Thomas Russell, Woods co-authored the first British textbook on medical statistics, Introduction to Medical Statistics, which was first published in 1931. The book was designed to serve as an introductory text for students studying for the Diploma in Public Health.

While at the LSHTM, Hilda Woods also published papers on respiratory disease (Woods, 1927, 1928a), scarlet fever and diphtheria (Woods, 1928b), as well as a methodological paper (Woods, 1929) that compared analytic and graphical methods for interpolation in life tables. In Greenwood's Divisional report for 1933, Woods' last year at the LSHTM, he described Woods’ “Epidemiological Study of Scarlet Fever in England and Wales since 1900”, as the Division’s most important paper.

Woods' tenure at the LSHTM came to an end in 1933 following her engagement to Roger Fowke, a prominent businessman in Ceylon, where she was married. Having lost her fiancé 18 years earlier, Woods suffered yet another tragic loss when her husband, aged 53 years, died suddenly, from septicaemia, in February 1934 two months into their marriage.

Many would have returned home in despair, but Woods immersed herself in important medical and social services of various kinds in Ceylon: as a member of the 1934 Ceylon Government Commission to study factory conditions and to advise on a new Factory Act. Also in 1934 she helped to compile and draft, as part of the Ceylon* Government Commission on Malaria, a statistical report on the epidemic. Both appointments led to reports tabled in the British and Ceylon Parliaments. Woods also organised temporary hospitals during the height of the malaria epidemic and later organised a new department for studying disease prevalences in Ceylon.

In the later 1930s, Woods sought health care in England, and war broke out before she had recovered. During the war she undertook investigations in nutrition for the Ministry of Food. One of those was an experiment randomising institutionalised girls to either fortified or ordinary chocolate, the results of which were published in 1943.

== Later life ==
From 1946 until the early 1960s, Woods lived predominantly with her brother's family, after his migration to Kenya, New Zealand, Australia, and then-Rhodesia. After the death of his wife in childbirth, she became the de facto mother of her niece, Rosemary. She returned to England with Rosemary a few years after her brother died in 1958. In 1970, Rosemary moved to South Africa and Woods joined her. She died there after a series of strokes, a week after Rosemary married one of her former students.

== Publications ==
- Woods and Russell, An Introduction to Medical Statistics
