= Chiltern Open Air Museum =

Attraction in Buckinghamshire, England

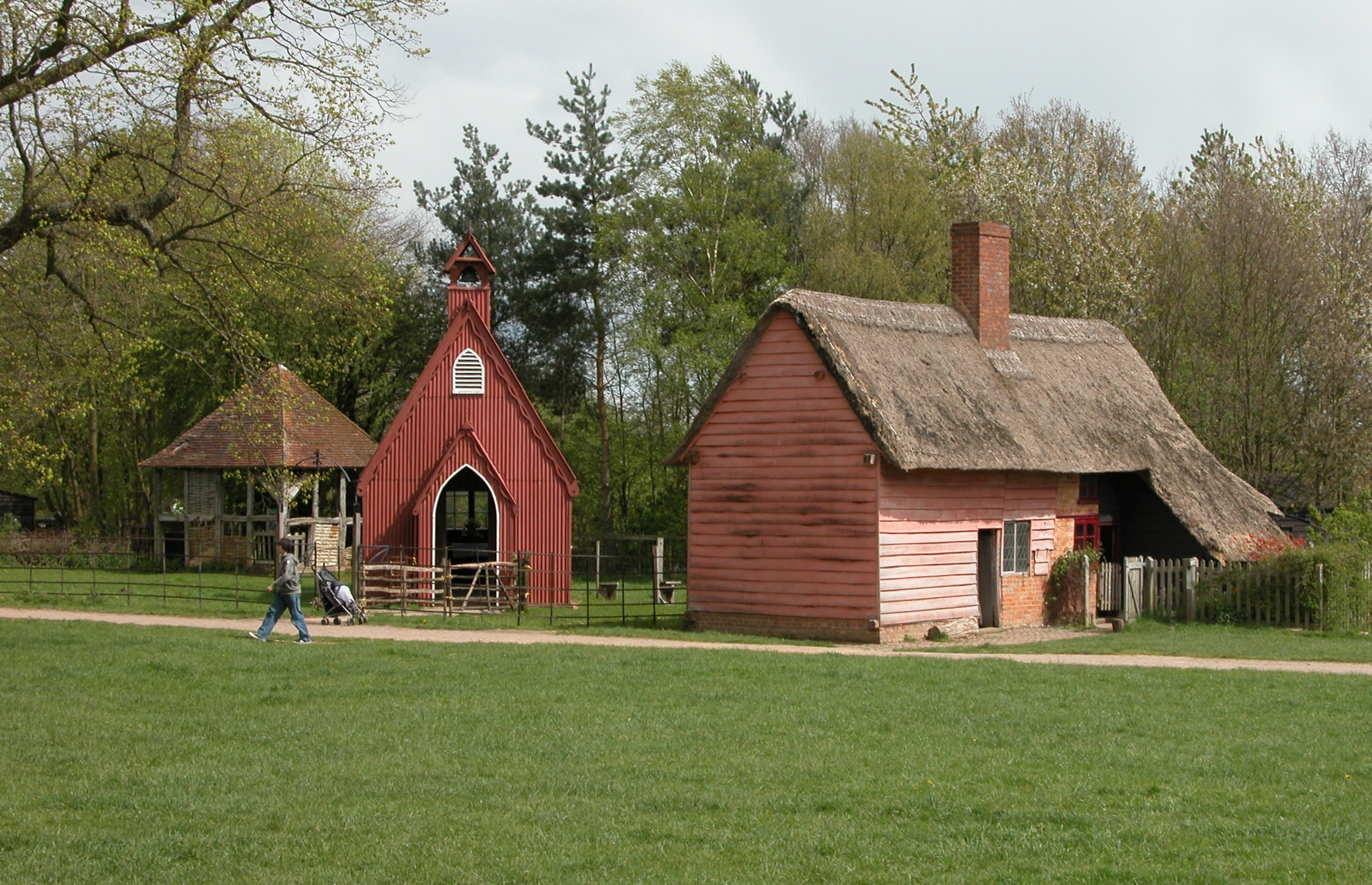
- Examples of a cottage and a prefabricated chapel at the Chiltern Open Air Museum

- Museum location in Buckinghamshire
- Established: 1976
- Location: Chalfont St. Giles, Buckinghamshire, England, UK
- Coordinates: 51°38′10.87″N 0°32′29.05″W
- Type: Open-air museum; Folk museum; Architecture museum
- Collections: Reconstructed vernacular buildings from the Chiltern Hills region
- Public transit access: Chalfont & Latimer; Chorleywood
- Website: coam.org.uk

Chiltern Open Air Museum (COAM) is an independent open-air museum of vernacular buildings and a tourist attraction located near Chalfont St Peter and Chalfont St. Giles in the Chiltern Hills, Buckinghamshire, England. Its collection consists mainly of historic buildings at risk of demolition that have been dismantled and reconstructed in the museum grounds in a process of structure relocation.

The museum is a registered charity under English law. It has a small number of full-time staff and a volunteer workforce of approximately 200.

== History ==
The museum was founded in 1976 and opened to the public in 1981. It rescues and restores common English buildings from the Chilterns, which might otherwise have been destroyed or demolished. The buildings have been relocated to the museum's 45-acre (180,000 m^{2}) site, which includes woodland and parkland. The collection has more than 35 buildings on view including barns, other traditional farm buildings and houses. There is a working historic farm with farm animals.

The charity's aims are to create a living landscape connecting the past to the present — people and place; preserving and interpreting the cultural heritage of the Chilterns.

Buildings of interest include a 1940s prefab from Amersham, a reconstruction of an Iron Age house, a Victorian toll house from High Wycombe, a "Tin Chapel" from Henton, Oxfordshire and a forge from Garston, Hertfordshire. A fine pair of cottages from 57 Compton Avenue at Leagrave, near Luton which started out as a weather-boarded thatched barn with central double doors in the early 18th century. In the late 18th century the barn was converted into two labourers' cottages. A chair factory from High Wycombe highlights the local chair making trade. There is a reconstructed WW1 Nissen hut and a reconstructed WW2 Nissen hut next to a 'Dig for Victory' allotment. In 2014, the museum completed reconstruction of a wychert-style farmhouse from Haddenham, which it had held in storage for 30 years awaiting the necessary funds.

The museum's collection includes 16 buildings that are held in storage and awaiting reconstruction, as and when the museum's funds permit. Among these is Jackson Studios, a recording studio used by the influential BBC Radio disc jockey, Jack Jackson, who was also known as the "father of DJs". In the 1970s, the studios were set up by Jack's sons, Malcolm and John as a commercial recording studio. The studios became noted for their ‘dead’ sound, and many noted artists recorded at the studios, including Elton John, Ian Dury, Dr Feelgood, and Motörhead (who recorded Ace of Spades there). With the advent of digital technology, the studios went out of business. The dismantled studio building is now in storage at the museum until the necessary funds can be raised to reconstruct them on-site.

At the museum there are many hands-on activities and traditional skills experience days including blacksmithing, willow sculpting and weaving, straw plaiting, historic cooking and folk singing. There are many annual events including re-enactments and living history.

The site is popular with school groups and has the Sandford Award, Learning Outside the Classroom Quality Badge and was shortlisted in the Museums + Heritage Awards in 2018 under the Education Initiative.

The site has an environmentally-friendly ethos. In June 2013, the Museum won the environmental category of the Pride of Bucks award, sponsored by B P Collins.

== In popular culture ==
The historic buildings on the Chiltern Open Air Museum site mean that it often used as a filming location for television and film period dramas, and the Museum is located 8 miles (13 km) from Pinewood Studios and 16 miles (26 km) from Leavesden Studios.

The museum has featured in a number of noted productions, including Mary Queen of Scots, Downton Abbey, Inside No. 9, Call the Midwife, Grantchester, Midsomer Murders, Horrible Histories, The Suspicions of Mr Whicher, Bramwell, Shine on Harvey Moon, and Taskmaster. The site has also been used as a location for a number of educational programmes and historical documentaries produced by BBC Schools, Thames Television and Anglia Television.

== Structures in the collection ==
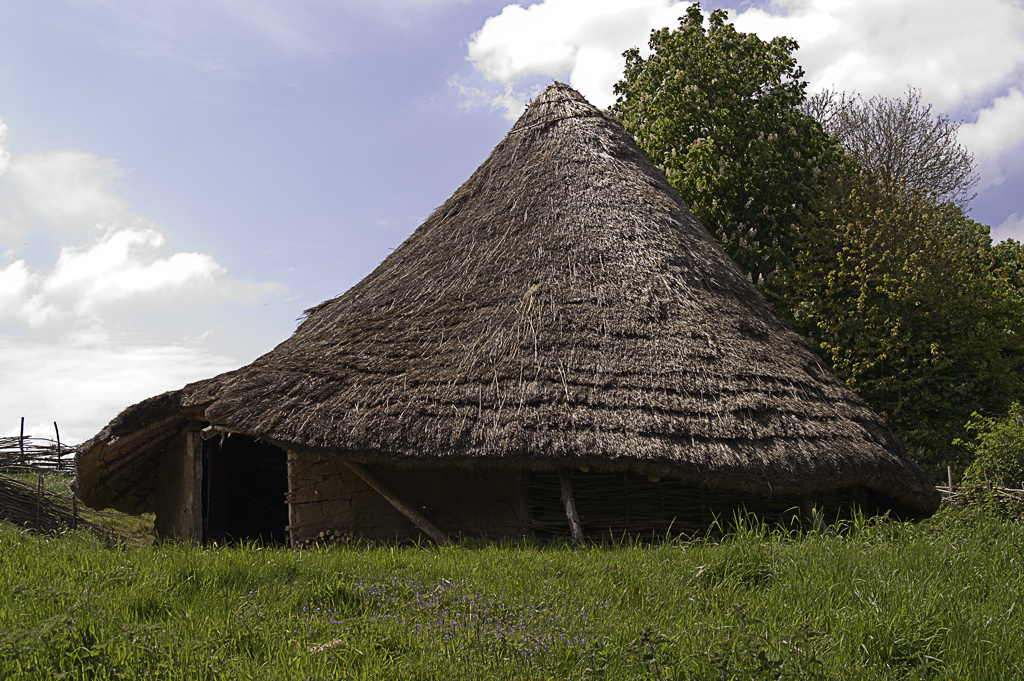
1994 reconstruction of an Iron Age roundhouse

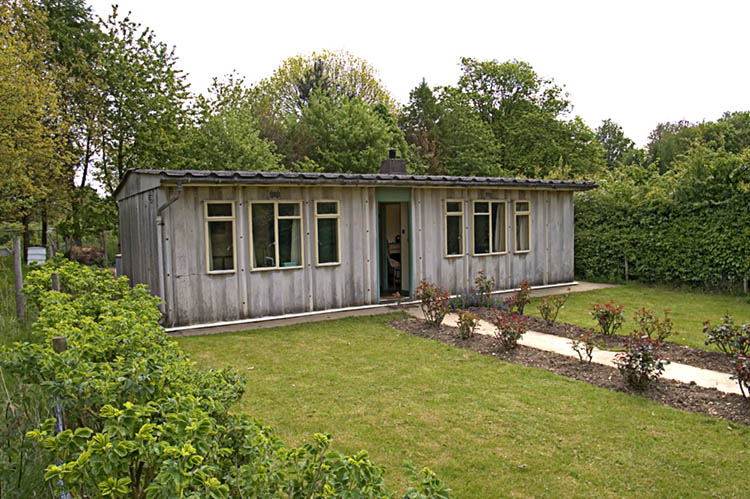
Prefabricated post-war house in corrugated asbestos cement

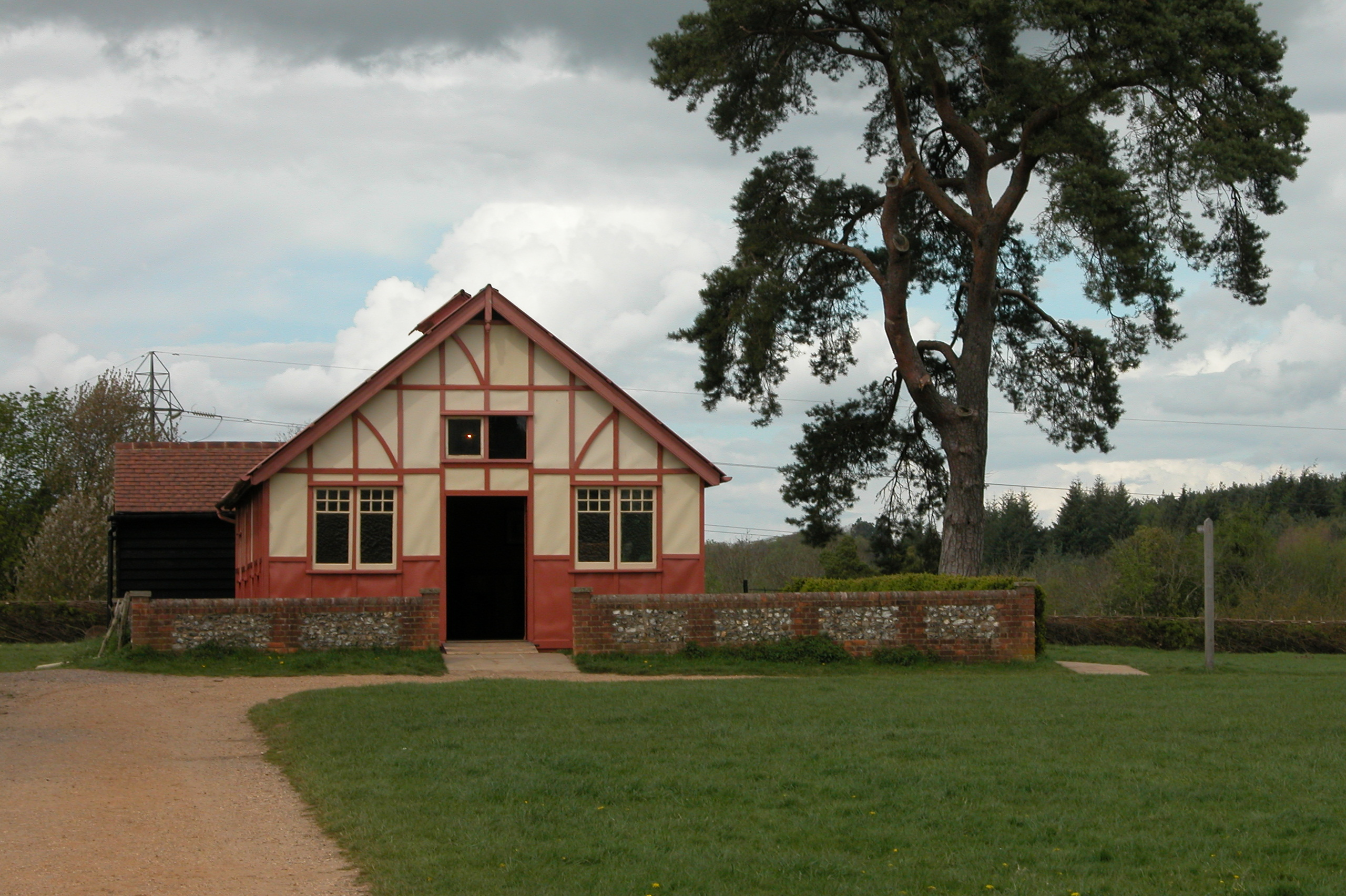
Thame Vicarage Room

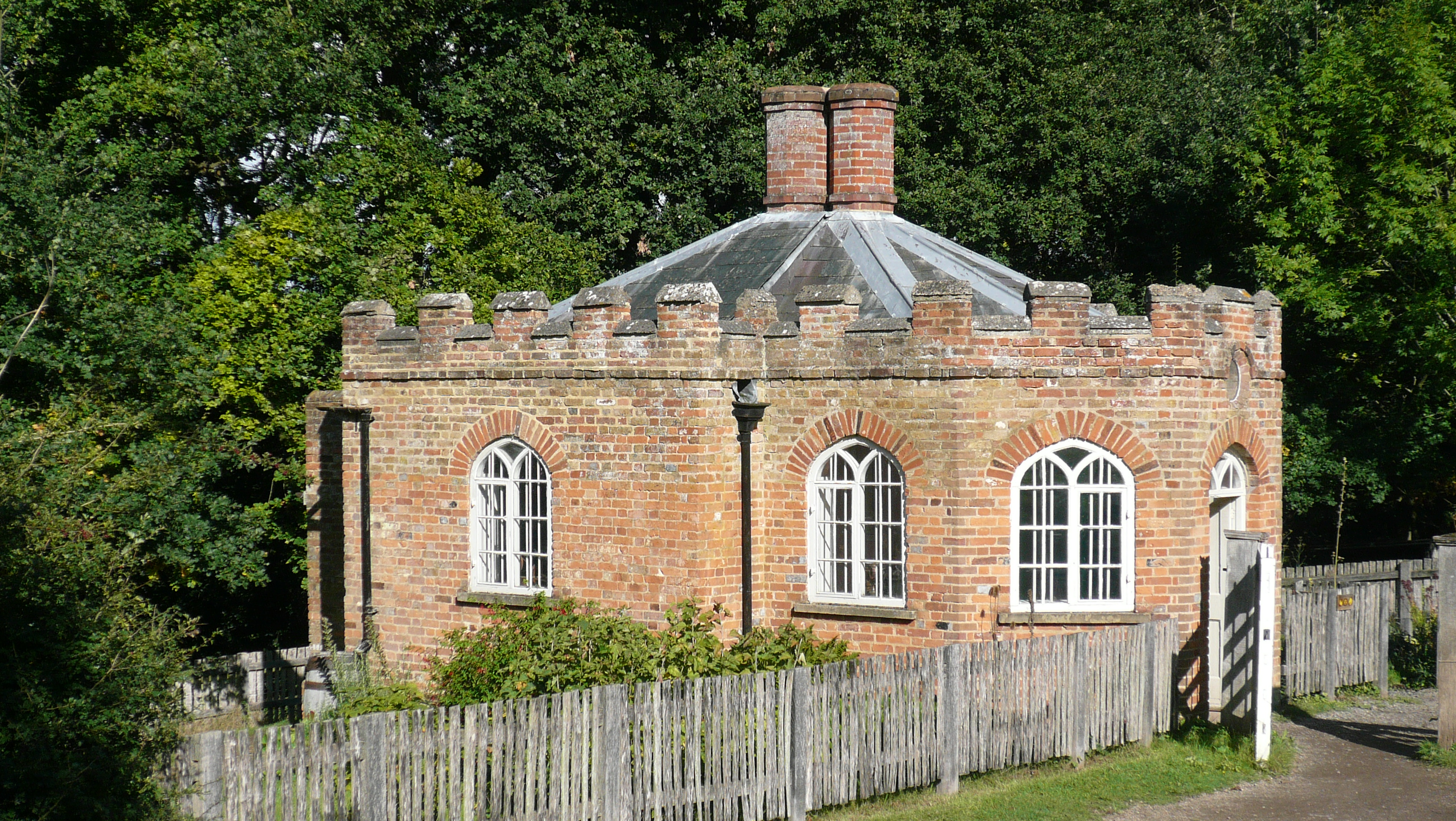
High Wycombe Toll House

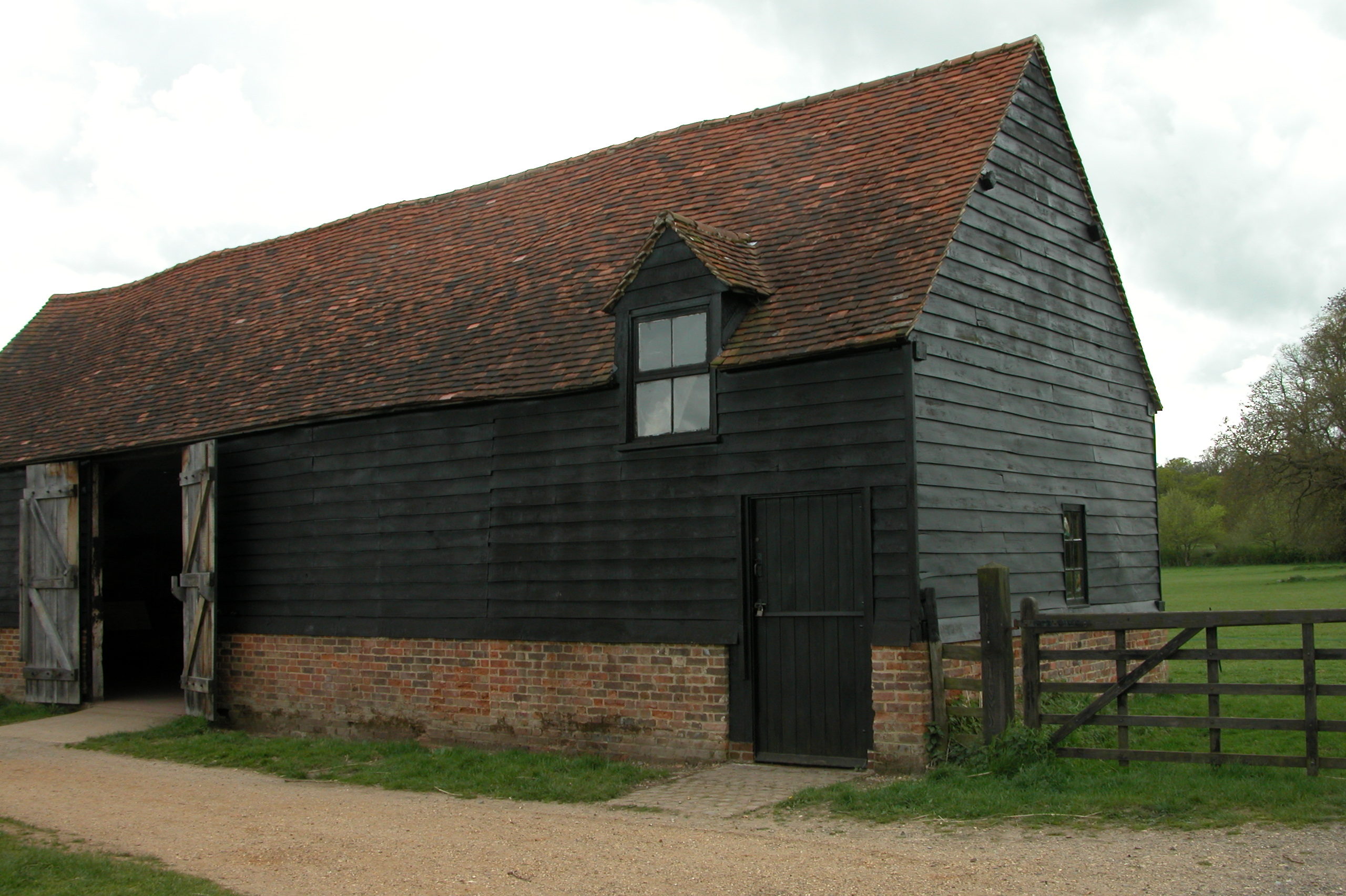
Skippings Barn

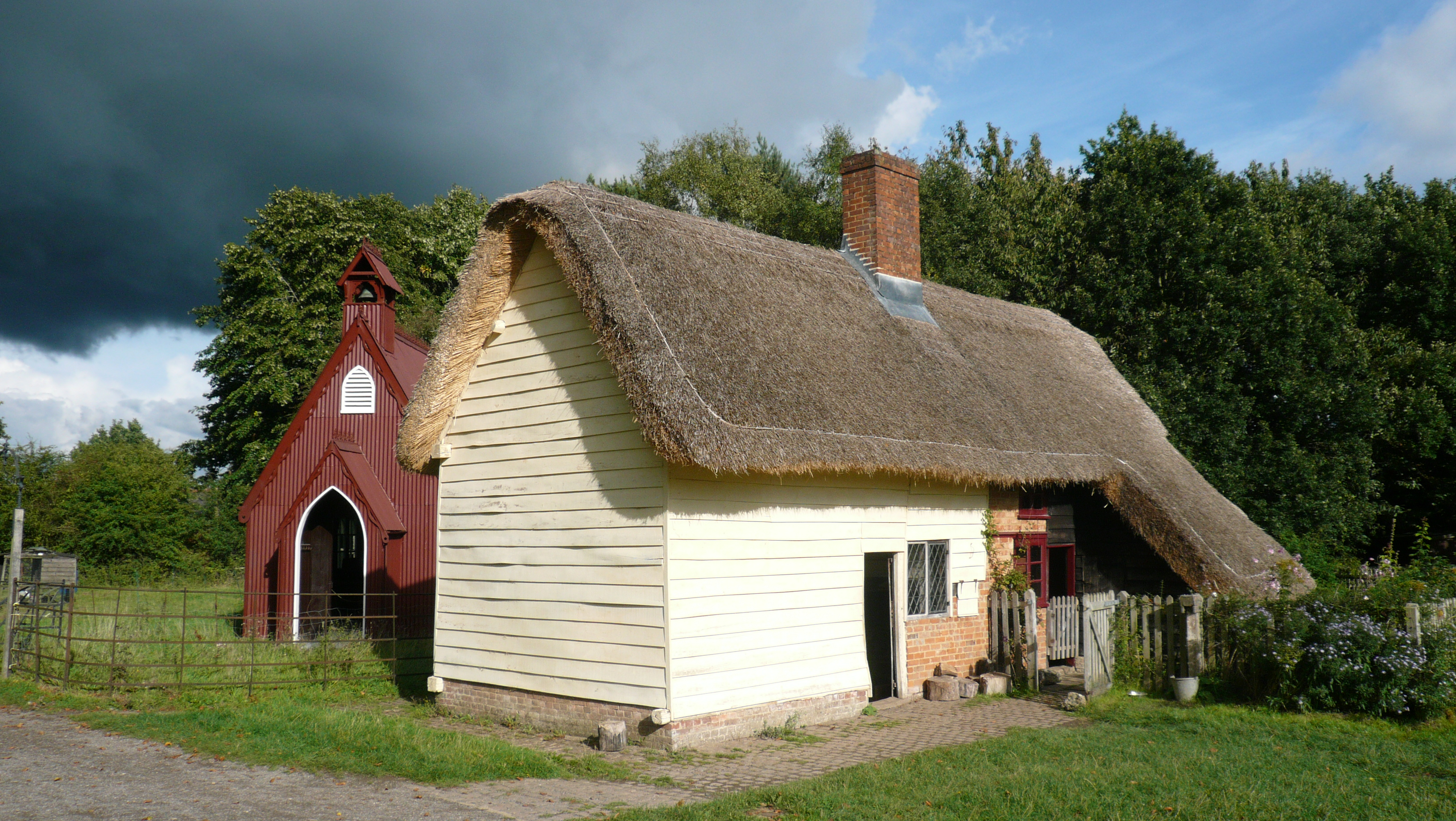
Thatched cottages from Leagrave

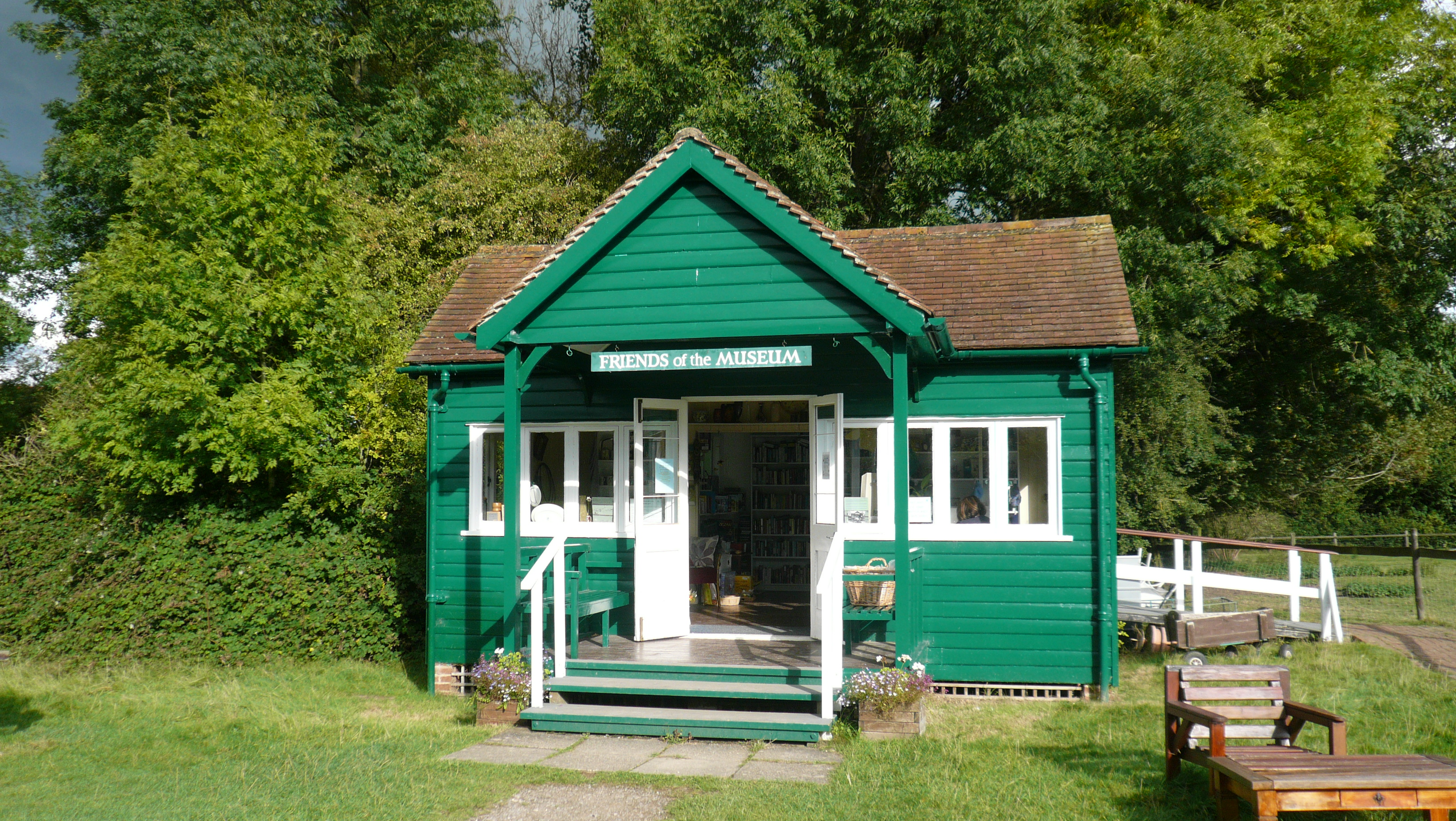
Tennis pavilion from Maidenhead

== See also ==
- List of museums in Buckinghamshire
- List of open-air and living museums
