= Hawridge Windmill =

Tower mill in Buckinghamshire, England

Hawridge Mill
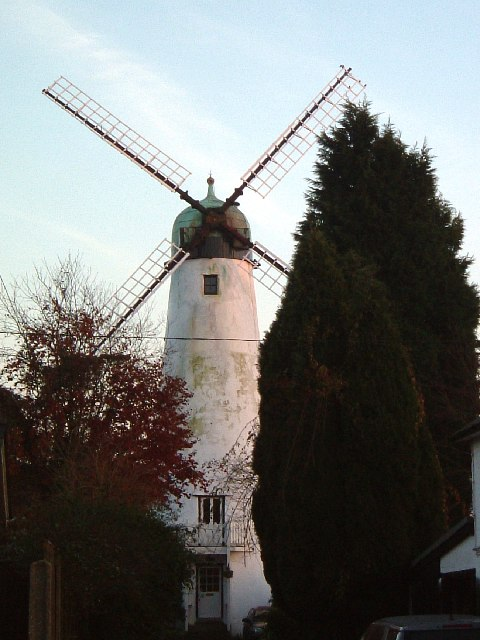
- Hawridge Mill
- Interactive map of Hawridge Mill

Origin
- Mill name: Hawridge Mill
- Mill location: SP 934 068
- Coordinates: 51°45′12″N 0°38′51″W
- Year built: 1883

Information
- Purpose: Corn mill
- Type: Tower mill
- Storeys: Four storeys
- No. of sails: Four sails
- Type of sails: single sails
- Winding: Fantail
- Fantail blades: six blades
- Auxiliary power: Originally a steam engine
- No. of pairs of millstones: Two pairs driven by wind

Hawridge Windmill which is also known as Cholesbury Windmill is a disused tower mill in Hawridge, Buckinghamshire. The mill was constructed on the site of an earlier smock mill and became a private residence in 1913 when the first occupier, the writer Gilbert Cannan used it as a studio.

== History ==
A windmill was first located on or near the site during the 17th and 18th centuries according to contemporary maps. The Hawridge Wind and Steam Mill was a smock mill constructed in 1863 by the Norwich Wind and Steam Company, who also installed a steam engine and built an engine house with a tall chimney. The smock mill was bought and sold at least twice; on the second occasion, in 1881, together with the related properties it realised £600. However it appears not to have been profitable due to; its poor design, faults in the construction, and the cost of coal. It was demolished in 1883.

A further mill was built on the same site in 1883. This was a tower mill, thought to be one of the last of its kind built in England. It was built by Hillsdon's of Tring for £300. The following year the tall chimney associated with the steam mill was taken down. A grain store was added shortly after. The original mill owners struggled to make it profitable and it was sold and then leased only becoming a going concern when a more experienced miller who remained in charge until the mill finally ceased operation in 1912. It became a private residence in 1913.

== Description ==
The mill is accessed via its own unmetalled track which passes across Rays Hill Common and between two properties. It is a Grade II listed building registered in 1958.

=== Smock mill ===
The smock mill comprised a two-storey square brick base with a narrow, eight-sided tarred wooden tower. There were four double-shuttered sails and a six-bladed fantail which were attached to machinery contained within a revolving cap.

=== Tower mill ===
The tower mill has four storeys and built of brick and coated in black rendering. After it ceased to be in operation it has been painted both white and black and is currently clad in white paint (see image which dates from 1998). The sails which had been retained when the mill was converted to a residence deteriorated over the years and following a gale in the 1950s one of the sails blew off. In 1968 the then occupier undertook restoration replacing the original dilapidated sails with dummy ones and spars which were painted red and white. Within the cap, which is original, the supporting rollers, rack, alignment wheels and windshaft have been preserved.

== Millers ==
The first miller of the smock mill was Thomas Moreton, born in Nuneaton and he was assisted by Charles Pedel a journeyman from Wendover. By 1871 he had been succeeded by Joseph Salt from Congleton In 1877 the miller was George Wright born in Cholesbury. In 1881 the last miller of this first mill was Harry Wright from Tring, Hertfordshire. Daniel Dwight is recorded as the first miller who occupied the newly built tower mill. A change of ownership resulted in Thomas Robinson from Moulton, Northamptonshire who was an experienced in steam powered mills, taking over in 1891. He continued to be the miller until it ceased operation in 1912 at which time he retired to the live at the nearby manor house.

== Public access ==
The mill has been converted to a private residence and is not open to the public.

== Culture and media ==
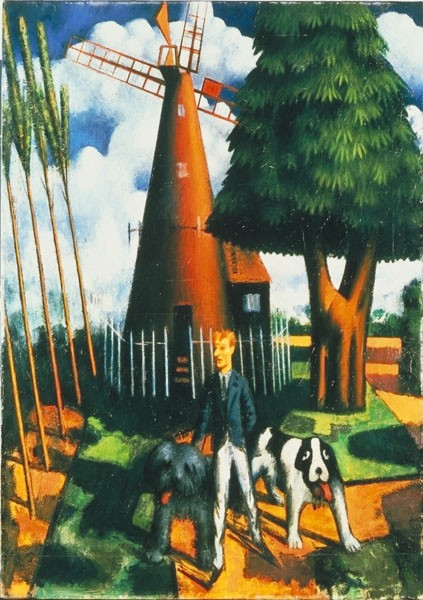
Gilbert Cannan at his Mill, 1916

After the mill ceased operation in 1912 it was crudely converted along with the mill house into residential accommodation. It was advertised in the spring of 1913 and was taken by Gilbert Cannan and his new wife Mary (née Ansell), who had previously been married to J. M. Barrie, the creator of Peter Pan. The Cannans immediately set about decorating the mill house property in an avantgarde style and the mill tower into an impromptu studio. Land was acquired at the rear of the property to create a garden. They invited their many friends and acquaintances, many of whom were associated with two artists' groups, the Bloomsbury Group and the lesser well-known London Group which were both prominent around the time of the First World War. The couple frequently invited so many of their friends to stay that it necessitated renting out neighbouring cottages. D. H. Lawrence and his new wife Freda rented a cottage in nearby Bellingdon and Katherine Mansfield and John Middleton Murry who were having an affair at the time lodged, next door to the Cannans, at The Gables before renting a cottage three miles away at The Lee. In December 1914 the group were joined by Ukrainian writer S. S. Koteliansky and the painter Mark Gertler and all spent a raucous Christmas partying in each other's houses. These, and related events at Cholesbury were depicted in pictures or formed the basis of several subsequent accounts in letters, memoirs and novels.

Gertler was a lodger at The Gables, between 1915–16, and soon installed himself in the mill's studio. He painted a famous picture of the mill called Gilbert Cannan at his Mill now on show in the Ashmolean Museum in Oxford. The picture depicts Cannan outside the Mill with his two dogs. One of them, which is black and white in colour, is believed to be a dog that had previously belonged to the Barries. The original inspiration for Nana in the book Peter Pan and the model for the illustrations of the dog in the first edition of Peter Pan was Porthos, the Barries' St Bernard. When Porthos subsequently died the Barries replaced him with Luath, a Landseer (black and white Newfoundland) dog whose behaviour was studied by the actor who played Nana in the first stage production of Peter Pan. The costume worn in this production was also black and white. The Mill was dubbed 'a poor man's Garsington' by those who also frequented Garsington Manor near Oxford, the artists' retreat of Lady Ottoline Morrell also a frequent guest at the mill. Compton Mackenzie was a regular visitor and based characters in his magnum opus, The Four Winds of Love on the Cannans and Lawrences. Recollections of his first stay at the mill are reprised through his main character's visit to the Rodneys' mill in the fictitious village of Summertune, Essex. Other acquaintances of the Cannans included; writer David Garnett, philosopher Bertrand Russell and historian G. M. Trevelyan. Like Cannan the patron of the arts Eddie Marsh was keen to support up-and-coming artists such as the novelists Maurice Hewlett and Hugh Walpole all three of whom visited. Gertler invited the painter and interior decorator Dora Carrington with whom he was infatuated only to lose her to the writer Lytton Strachey who was also a sometime house guest. Gilbert Cannan was a long-time friend of the poet John Drinkwater whose poem September includes a reference to Cholesbury.

The Cannans left the mill in 1916 and in 1917 it was rented by a friend of theirs, the celebrated American actress of the day, Doris Keane who used it as a weekend retreat whilst appearing in London theatre productions. In the 1930s the mill was used as an art studio and for classes by the artist Bernard Adams. During the Second World War it was used as a look out post for the Home Guard. During the latter part of the 20th century it was owned by Sir David Hatch, BBC radio producer and a managing director of BBC radio.
