= Amersham Museum =

Coordinates: 51°39′59″N 0°37′09″W

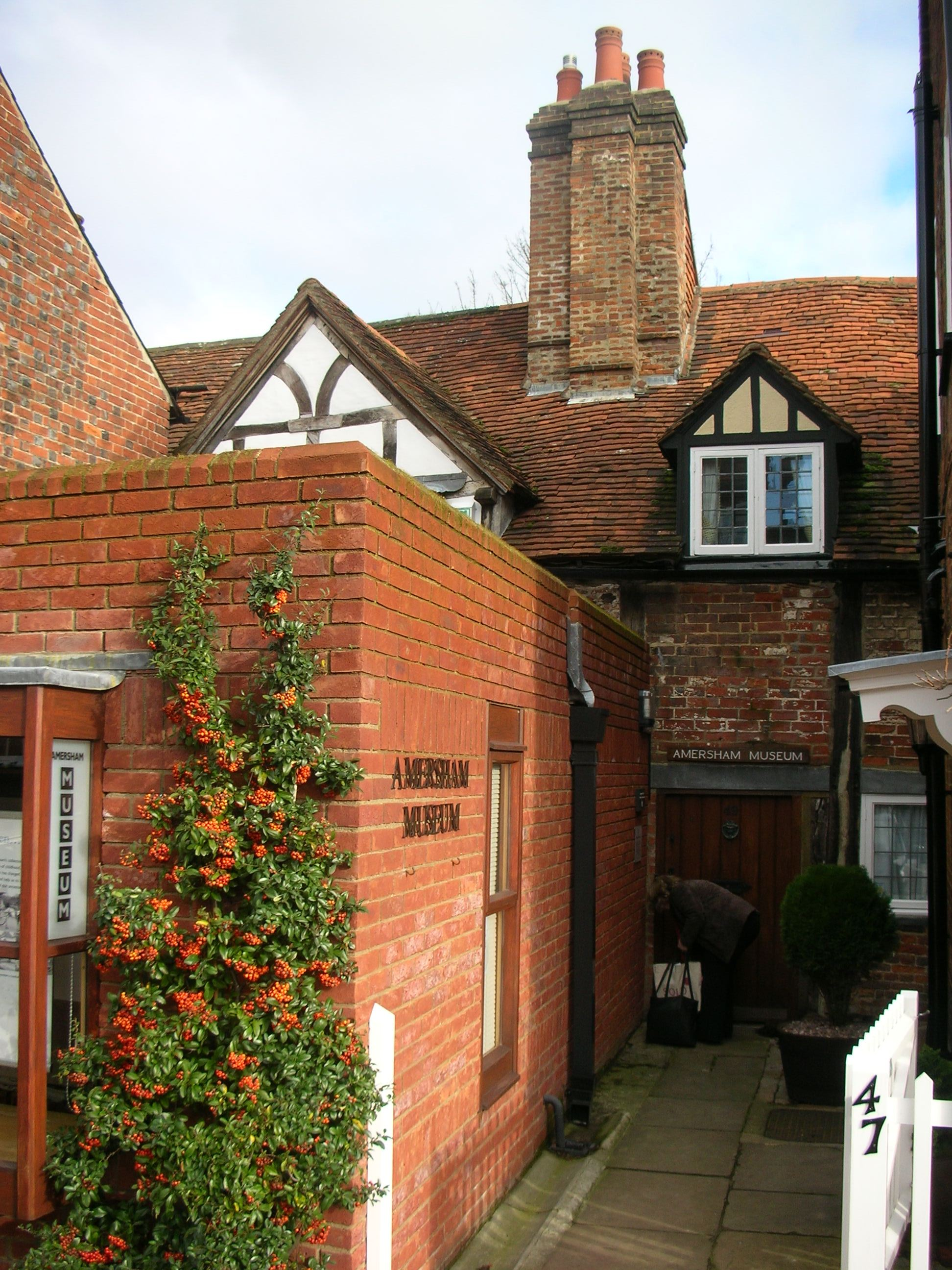
- Established: 1991 (extended 2001 and 2017)
- Location: 49 and 51 High Street, Amersham, Buckinghamshire HP7 0DP, England
- Type: Independent local history museum
- Website: www.amershammuseum.org

Amersham Museum at 49 and 51 High Street is a small local museum based in Amersham, Buckinghamshire, England. It is located on the High Street in Old Amersham.

== History ==
The museum is partly located in a 15th-century half-timbered house, listed Grade II on the National Heritage List for England, with a herb garden to the rear, and covers local history. It has collections of fossils and archaeological finds, including objects from Roman and mediaeval times, and displays on local crafts including chairmaking, lace making and straw plait. Exhibits focus on five key dates in the town's history: 1580, 1775, 1892, 1939 and 1964.

It was originally opened to the public in 1991. In 2001 the front of the museum was extended thanks to a National Lottery Heritage Fund grant.

In 2017 the Museum re-opened following a major development that included expansion into the neighbouring property at 51 High Street, a former post office. This enabled the museum to create a new introductory exhibition gallery, combined activity and temporary exhibition space, two collections stores, indoor adapted WC and lift. The museum also gained a modern glass reception and gift shop.

In March 2024 the Museum re-opened with a new temporary exhibition gallery, the Marie-Louise von Motesiczky Gallery, named for the emigree Austrian artist who lived in Amersham during the Second World War, and whose Charitable Trust funded the redevelopment.

== See also ==
- List of museums in Buckinghamshire
- St Mary's Church, also in Old Amersham
