= Sandford Award =

The Sandford Award, previously the Sandford Award for Heritage Education, is a British and Irish award for education programmes at heritage sites. Its website describes it as "an independently judged, quality assured assessment of education programmes at heritage sites, museums, archives and collections across the British Isles".

It is named for Lord Sandford (John Edmondson, 2nd Baron Sandford, 1920–2009).

The awards are administered by the Heritage Education Trust and Bishop Grosseteste University.
