= Cowper and Newton Museum =

Museum in Olney, Buckinghamshire

Coordinates: 52.15257°N 0.70088°W

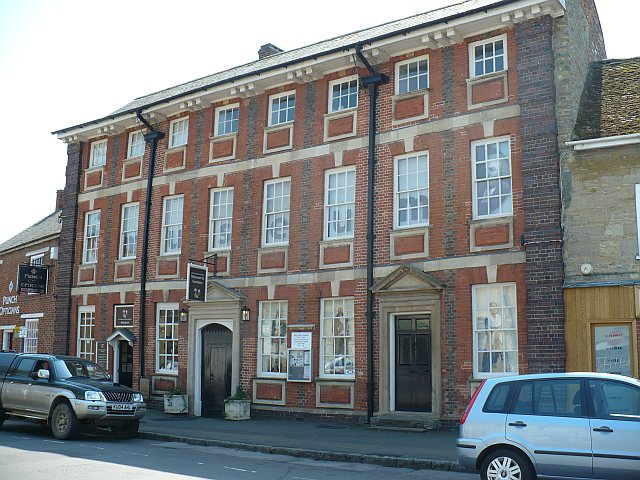
Cowper and Newton Museum, orchard side

The Cowper and Newton Museum is a museum in Olney, north Buckinghamshire, England, around 8 miles (13 km) north-east of Central Milton Keynes. Celebrating the work and lives of two famous local residents: William Cowper (1731–1800), a celebrated 18th-century poet; and John Newton (1725–1807), a slave trader and subsequently a prominent abolitionist, who was curate in the local church. Together, Cowper and Newton wrote the Olney Hymns, including one of the world's most popular hymns, "Amazing Grace".

The museum is housed in a large red-brick Georgian house, called Orchard Side, on the corner of Market Place in Olney.

== History ==
The Museum building is original to the Georgian era and is presented as it would have been when William Cowper was its resident in 1768 to 1786. Within the Museum's collections are the literary works and personal effects of William Cowper, showing a detailed insight into Georgian life and a fine collection of lace and local history artefacts. The history of Olney is also presented in the Olney Rooms within the museum.

It has two unique gardens of outstanding horticultural interest as they are planted only with specimens introduced to England before 1800.

The museum first opened in 1900.

== The Flower Garden & Summerhouse Garden ==
Originally the Summerhouse Garden belonged to the apothecary who lived next door to Orchard Side. After Thomas Aspray's death, Cowper was allowed the use of this former medicinal and herbal garden. Selected friends were allowed to visit him in the unique building in the centre of the garden, which he described as his "verse manufacturey". After the poet's death in 1800, admirers of his works visited this small "literary shrine" and many inscribed their names and dates on the walls and ceiling - the earliest found being 1802! - all of which can still be seen today.

== Celebrations ==
In July 2022, following the securing of funding from Milton Keynes City Council, the MK Community Foundation, the National Lottery Heritage Fund and Arts Council England, the town's Cowper and Newton Museum launched the "Amazing Grace 250" project to celebrate the 250th anniversary of the Amazing Grace hymn, featuring a host of exhibitions and special events in Olney, the wider Milton Keynes area, and beyond.

== Other ==
The vicarage is close by, where Cowper's friend and clergyman John Newton (1725–1807), wrote the hymn Amazing Grace. Newton and his wife are buried in the local churchyard.

The museum is promoted by the Campaign to Protect Rural England. and is a charitable trust run almost entirely by volunteers.

== See also ==
- List of museums in Buckinghamshire
