= Quainton Windmill =

Historic windmill in Quainton, England

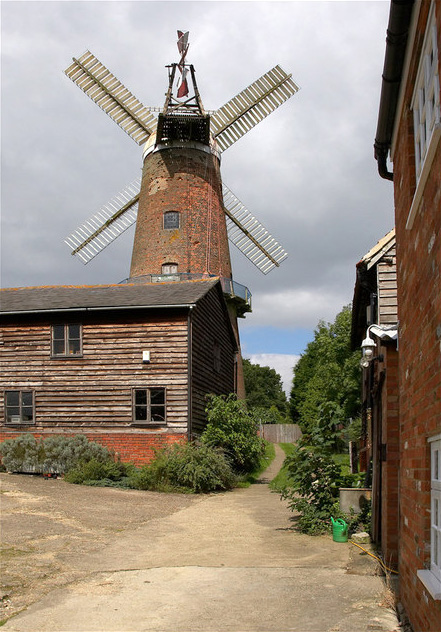
- Buckinghamshire's tallest working windmill
- Interactive map of Quainton Windmill

Origin
- Mill name: Quainton Windmill
- Coordinates: 51.87558°N 0.916377°W
- Operator: Quainton Windmill Society
- Year built: 1830-1832

Information
- Purpose: Corn mill
- Type: tower mill
- Storeys: Six storeys
- No. of sails: Four sails
- Type of sails: Patent sails
- Windshaft: Metal
- Winding: Hand winded via chain and wheel
- No. of pairs of millstones: One

Aerial view of Quainton Windmill.

Quainton Windmill is a historic windmill in the village of Quainton, Buckinghamshire, England, United Kingdom.

The 70 ft (20m) six-storey brick tower mill, built 1830–32, is one of the most visible buildings in the village. Derelict for most of the 20th century, it has now been restored and can grind wheat into flour. The windmill was built by James Anstiss and it is still owned by his direct descendants. It is the tallest windmill in Buckinghamshire.

The mill had a steam engine installed early in its working life. Until 1881, it was wind-driven, but milling came to an end in 1900. The building remained unused as a mill, with only part of one sail remaining, until 1974, when the owner formed the Quainton Windmill Society, with the aim of restoring the windmill. The Society spent 23 years undertaking restoration work. In 1997, milling was re-established.

In 2013 English Heritage and The Department of Culture, Media and Sport have upgraded the listing status of the mill from Grade II to Grade II* for the following principal reasons:

- Architectural interest: the windmill reflects in its design and machinery the specific function it was intended to fulfil and how it was adapted to meet changes in technology and in the economy;
- Intactness: the original mill machinery and fittings are intact and in working order;
- Rarity: it is an example of a tall six-storey windmill and is the third tallest windmill in England. It was altered to be operated by an auxiliary steam engine which unusually was placed within the structure of the mill.

An external survey was carried out on 2 October by Oxley Conservation and Bonwick Milling Heritage Consultancy. Using a giant “cherry- picker” enabling them to closely examine the structure of the mill and to provide a detailed report of its condition. The report states: ‘The extent of decay suffered is such that the head frame timbers have been significantly weakened and will be particularly vulnerable to failure in adverse weather conditions [high winds]; this risk is heightened by the sails and fantail which will exert tremendous forces on the timbers.’ With have agreement of English Heritage and the A.V.D.C. Historic Building Risk Officer the Sails and the Fantail were removed in December 2013 to reduce the stress on the timbers.

These have since been fully restored and, when the wind is sufficient and the mill is open, the sails can be seen to turn again.

The mill is open Sundays between 10am and 12.30pm between March and October.

== See also ==
- List of windmills in Buckinghamshire
