= Chesham Museum =

Museum in Buckinghamshire, England

Coordinates: 51°42′11″N 0°36′07″W

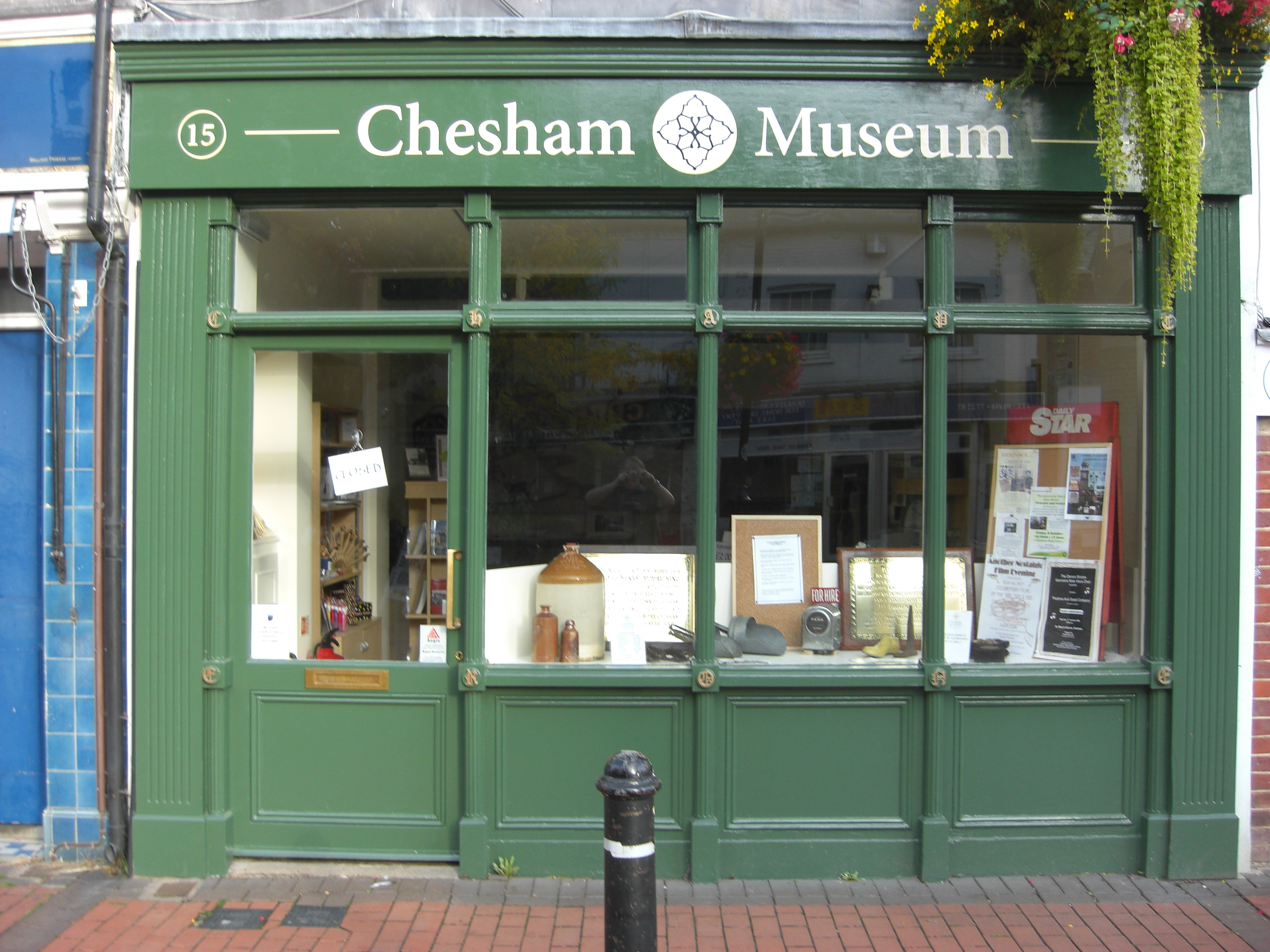
- Established: 2004, relocated October 2009, relocated again in 2024
- Location: Town Hall, Parsonage Lane Chesham, Buckinghamshire HP5 1EP, England
- Type: Private, Community and local history museum
- Website: www.cheshammuseum.org.uk

Chesham Museum is based in Chesham, Buckinghamshire, England. The museum, which is run by volunteers, first opened in 2004 housed in temporary premises known as 'The Stables'. The museum relocated to the town's Market Square, in October 2009. Having been closed for a number of years Chesham Museum is reopening its doors in Chesham Town Hall, January 2024. The museum's collection of artefacts and photographs documents the history of the town and surrounding areas.

== History ==
Town Picture

The initial idea for a museum was suggested in 1981 by the late Arnold Baines a longstanding Chesham resident, councillor and local historian. The Francis Trust was originally set up to raise funds to restore a painting known as the Town Picture and having achieved this objective the Trust's volunteers took up the challenge to establish a town museum. However, despite much local enthusiasm progress on establishing the museum was initially frustrated by the lack of official support to generate sufficient funds or secure suitable premises. In 1991 the Town Museum Project was launched. Over a ten-year period from 1992, and in the absence of premises, a hard-working team created a succession of thirty-eight temporary displays in a dedicated cabinet in Chesham Library. A diverse range of themes were tackled including a number on Chesham's industrial heritage; several commemorating national and local events and anniversaries; one on non-conformist churches and chapels; and a series on the renowned worthies of Chesham, including the Liberty and Lowndes families. Alongside the exhibits talks and fundraising events were organised and a Friends' newsletter produced. Despite this with only limited funds available it remained not possible to secure a permanent home for the rapidly growing collection donated by local people.

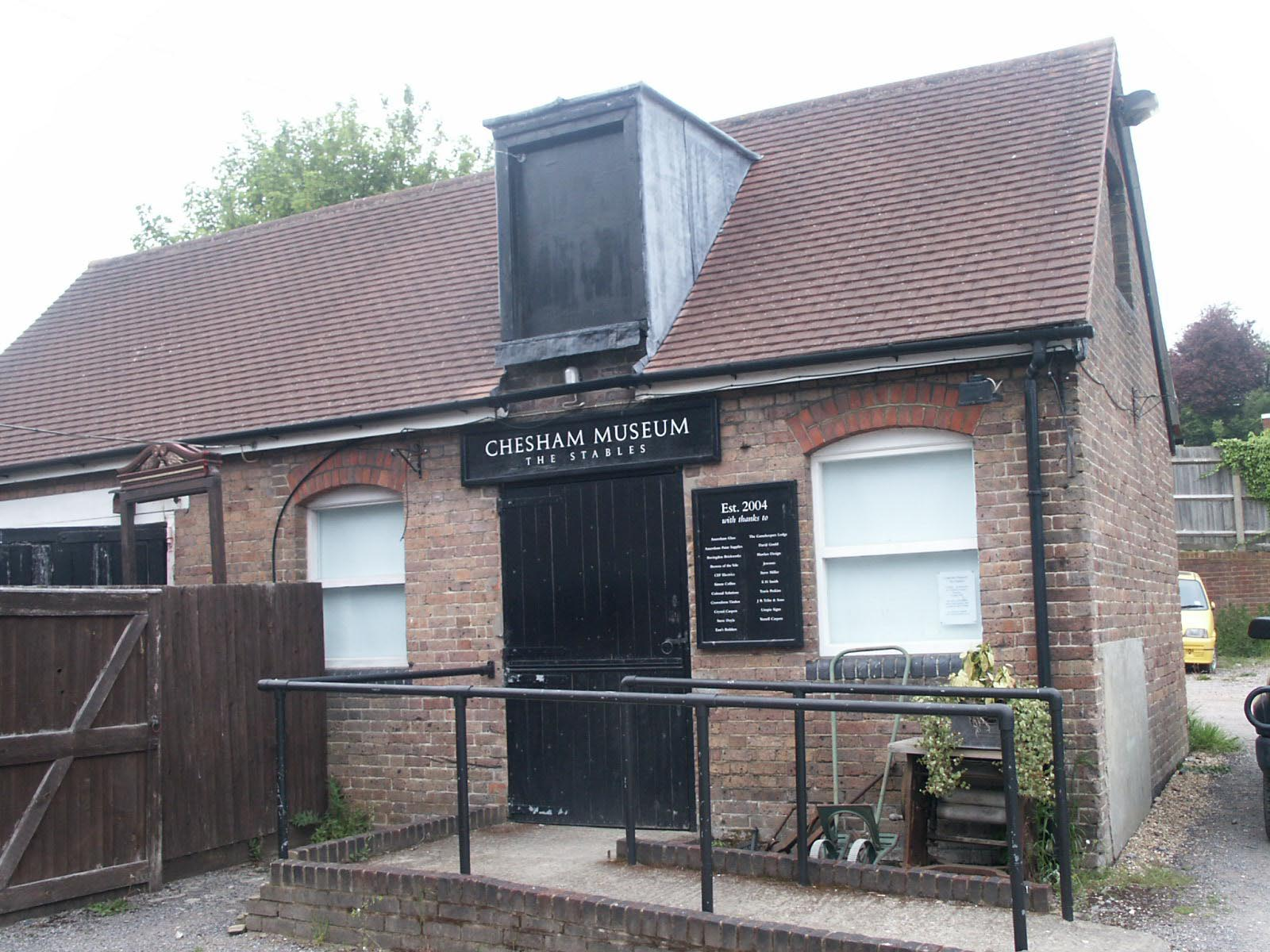
The Stables Chesham Museum's former home

In 2003 the Town Museum Project was wound up but some of the original project members joined with the publican of the Gamekeepers Lodge in Bellingdon Road who offered temporary facilities in a stable block behind the pub. The museum, located in 'The Stables', first opened to the public in 2004. Due to the limited available space, since opening in 2004, the museum adopted a rolling programme of themed temporary displays to maximise the access for visitors to as much of the collection as possible.

In 2008 the museum's Trustees announced that the museum was proposing to relocate to larger facilities in the Market Square, premises previously occupied by the Chapter One Bookshop. No 15 Market Square is a Grade II Listed Building built in the 17th century or earlier. The museum's temporary base at The Stables closed in November 2008 to enable a planned transfer to the new site. The campaign succeeded in raising funds enabling the museum to secure the lease on the premises which was signed in August 2009. The museum re-opened on 6 October 2009. However having been closed for a number of years from June 2018 it is now reopening its doors in Chesham Town Hall, from the end of January 2024.

== Collections and activities ==
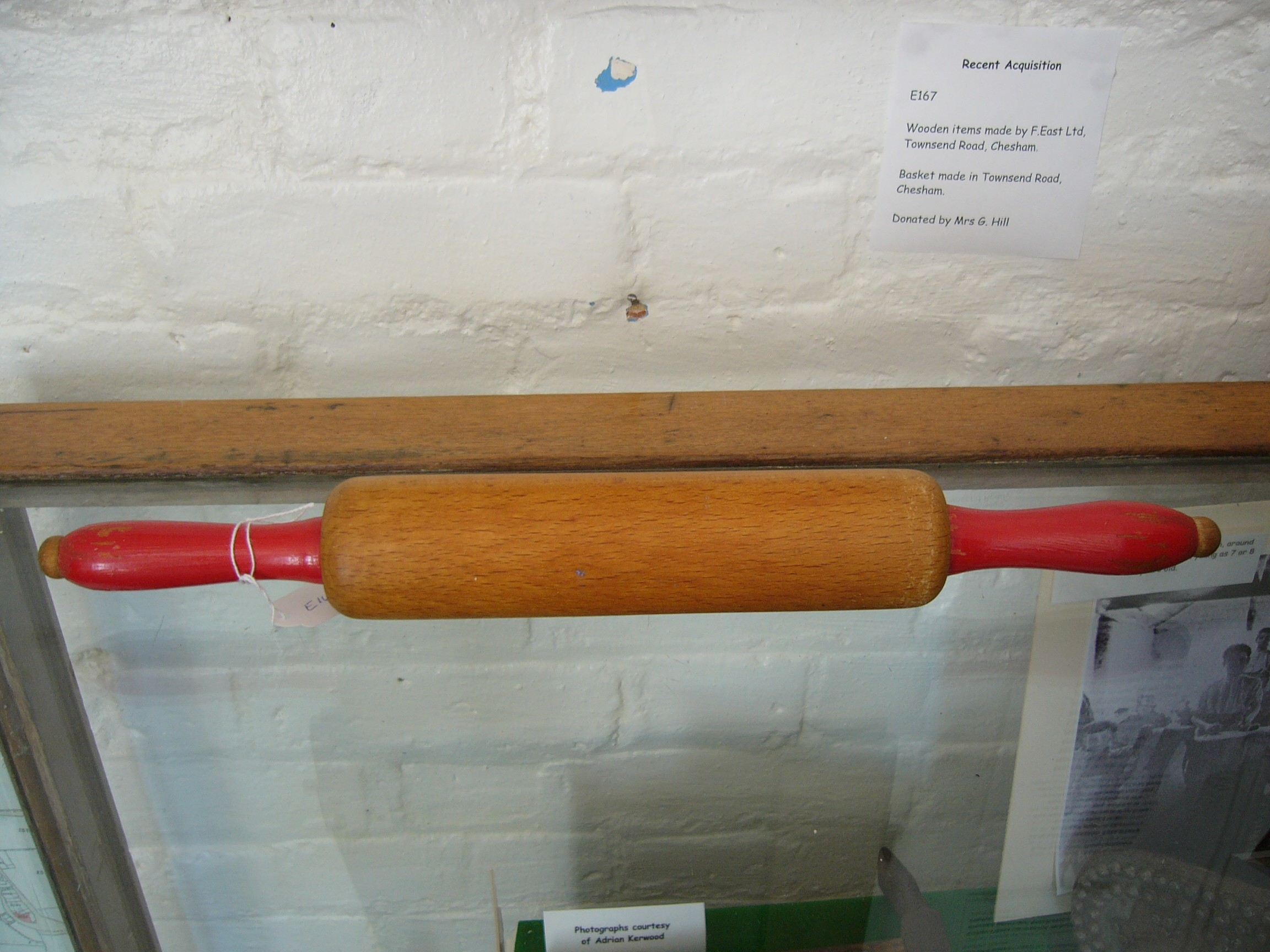
Rolling-pin woodenware

The major focus of the museum is on the town's social, cultural, religious and industrial heritage. There is a substantial social history collection, comprising over 700 photographs, oral and video recordings, objects and documents relating to such topics as: Chesham's unique history of religious non-conformity; the influence of the major families and other 'worthies' of the town; and the early days of some of Chesham's institutions, societies and public services such as the fire brigade and the cottage hospital. These themes are illustrated through the five permanent displays: Made in Chesham; Chesham at War; Coming to Chesham; Digging up the Past, and Remember Chesham.

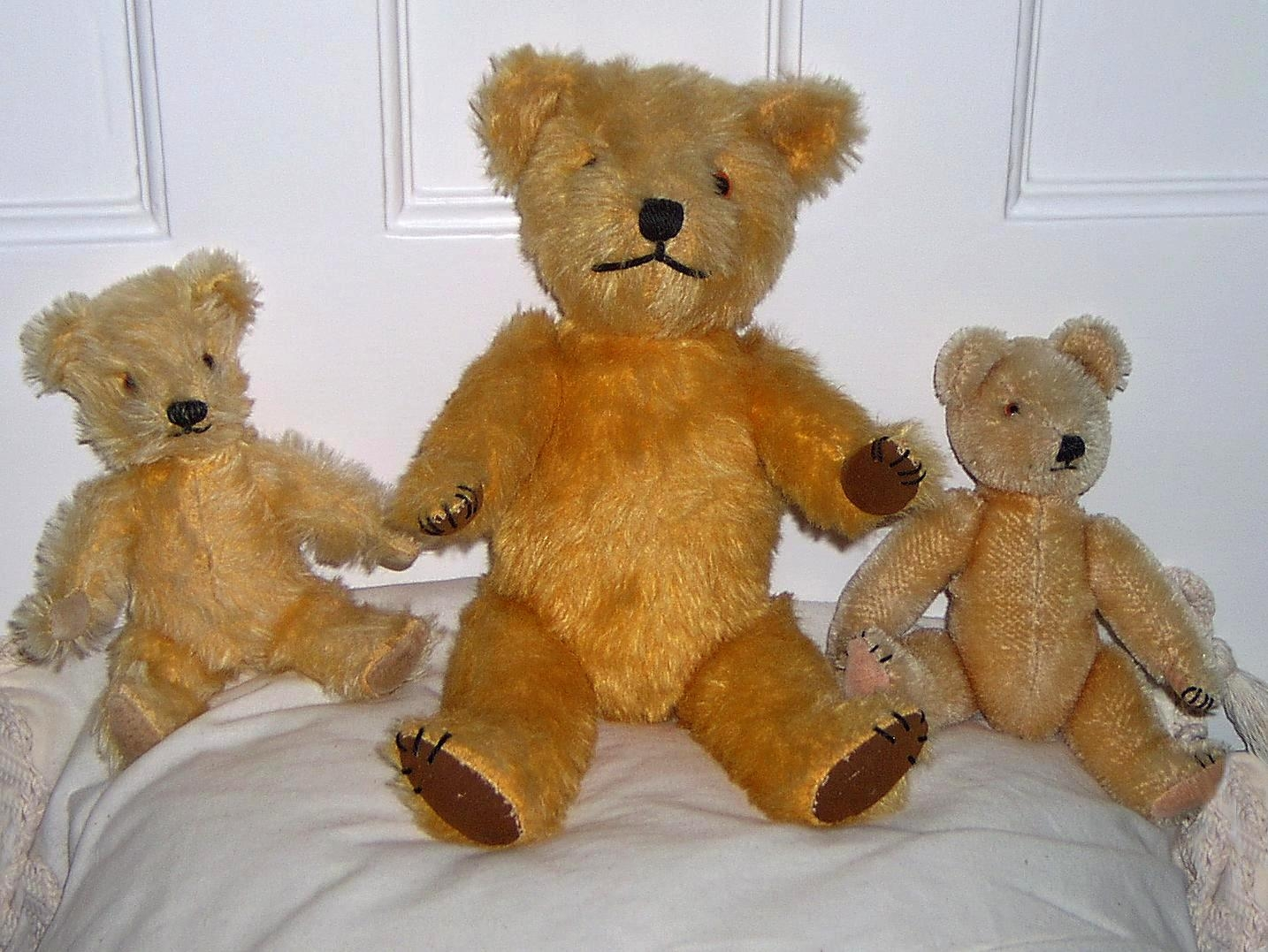
Chiltern Bears made in Chesham

=== Made in Chesham ===
There is wide variety of artefacts, including craftsmen's tools, manufactured goods and toys, reflecting the changing fortunes of its traditional industries; - boots and shoes, brushes, woodenware and beer brewing. Exhibits demonstrate the transition from cottage industries to ones carried out in large Victorian factories. Early on in the 20th century the town was the centre of diverse industrial activity. Among the vast range of products made were handbags, pencils, teddy bears, aircraft seats, flags and aluminium foil. Through its exhibits, which form part of its permanent display, the museum illustrates how these manufacturing industries first flourished and then, in the second half of the 20th century, declined as they were progressively replaced by new businesses relating to pharmaceuticals, information technology and engineering.

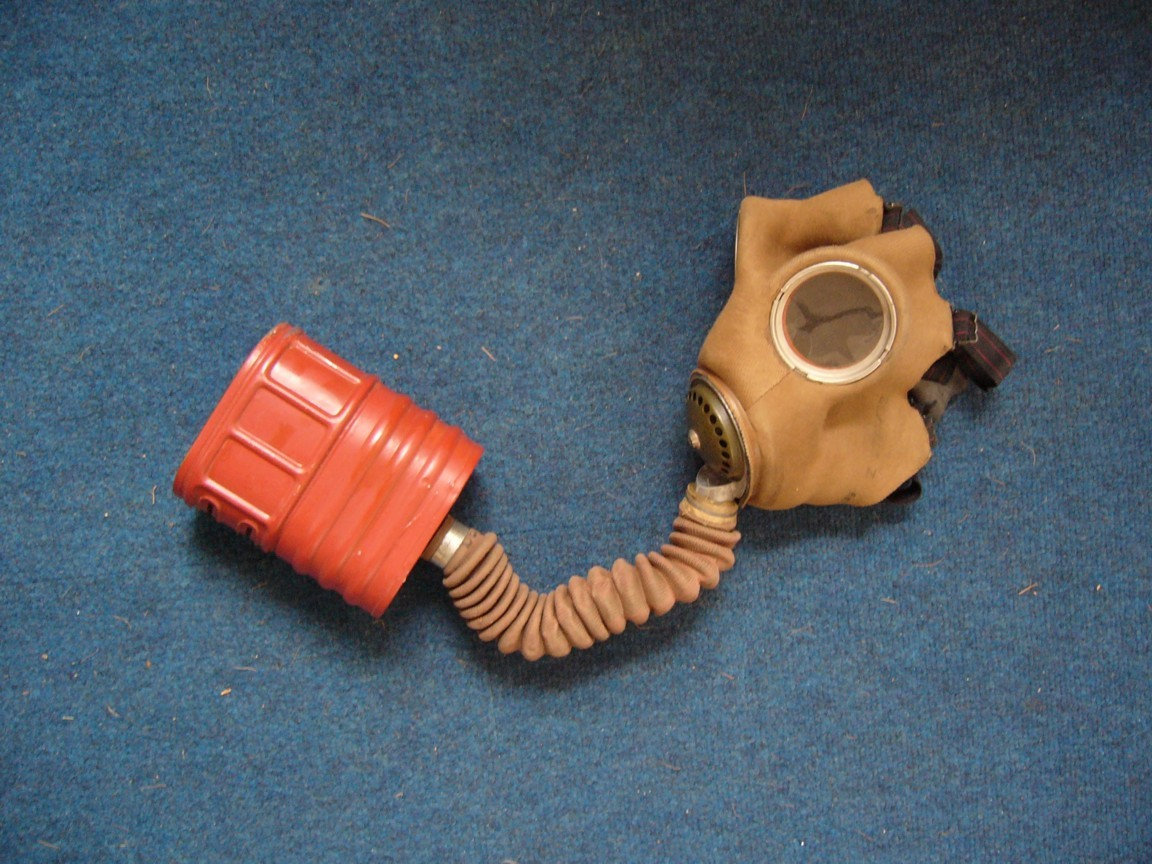
Gas Mask

=== Chesham at war ===
The museum also has a growing collection of 20th century images recording day-to-day life in wartime Chesham; the impact on people and the town of the First and Second World Wars and those who left the town to fight. Displays include the gas masks that were issued to adults and children, the activities of Air Raid Wardens, and how the use of ration cards and the growing of vegetables became the way of life for everyone.

=== Coming to Chesham ===
The story of how people arrived in Chesham, over the years for many reasons described through images, interviews and memorabilia. For example, the upheavals that resulted from a rise in religious non-conformity, as evacuees during the Second World War, those who were drawn by the demand for skilled labour in the 1950s, and those arriving more recently from the Commonwealth.

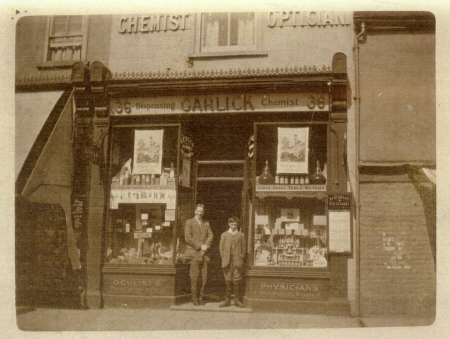
Old Photo of Chemist Shop

=== Digging up the past ===
Some of the results of archaeological investigations which have played a crucial role in unlocking the story of the town's past as well as topographical and mapping surveys are accessible. The museum has also displayed prehistoric artefacts from Chesham now in the County Museum, Aylesbury, including a Bronze Age bowl imported from the Alps.

=== Remember Chesham ===
Another important area of work, currently underway is the gathering of oral and video histories through the recording of reminiscences from those who are long-term residents of the town. Through audio-visual, photographic and documents the memories of local people reflecting, on what has changed and what has remained constant in more recent times.

=== Temporary displays and website ===
The museum has space for temporary exhibition space which changes each spring and autumn. The first of these at the new location in autumn 2009 exhibition was entitled Pastimes and Pleasure the story of entertainment in Chesham, from amateur theatre to radio and television. Other exhibitions in 2010 included House & Home - The development of housing in Chesham and Chesham Girl Guides 1915-2010 Celebrations. In the first half of 2011 the exhibition was Medieval Chesham put on in conjunction with Chess Valley Archaeological and Historical society, and The Lion Rampant Medieval Display Society. For the latter part of 2011 the exhibits were about the Watercress Industry in the Chess Valley. During 2012 exhibitions have covered Sports and Recreaction and Brewing in Chesham.

== Community museum ==
Since its inception, the museum has undertaken conservation work and research. It has provided for educational visits, town walks, craft displays and put on exhibitions at other locations. However, the shortage of space and its location away from the town centre limited the activities of the museum. In the museum's business plan the trustees set out their intentions to create a fully-fledged community museum at the relocated site. By relocating to larger premises in the town's centre the trustees envisaged being able to stimulate more interest from town people and visitors in Chesham's heritage. Although themed temporary displays will continue to feature, increased space now permits permanent exhibits and a dedicated area for group visits with audio-visual facilities. There is also an intention to interact more fully with other institutions, such as Chesham Library, the theatre and other social and cultural groups.

== Management and funding ==
The museum, which is a registered charity, is overseen by a board of trustees operating as an executive committee with overall responsibility for the management of the museum's collection and its activities. The collection is looked after by a team of volunteers. The museum is funded by public subscription, and through fund-raising events. As of 1 March 2014 it is free to visit the museum thanks to the generosity of Waitrose. Entry to the museum is now free until 2017.

== Bibliography ==
Armour, Charles (2003). A Display Case in the Library - The History of the Chesham Town Museum Project. Chesham, England: Francis Trust. ISBN 0-9546318-0-3.
