= Long Crendon Courthouse =

15th-century building in Aylesbury, Buckinghamshire, England

Coordinates: 51.7759°N 0.9900°W

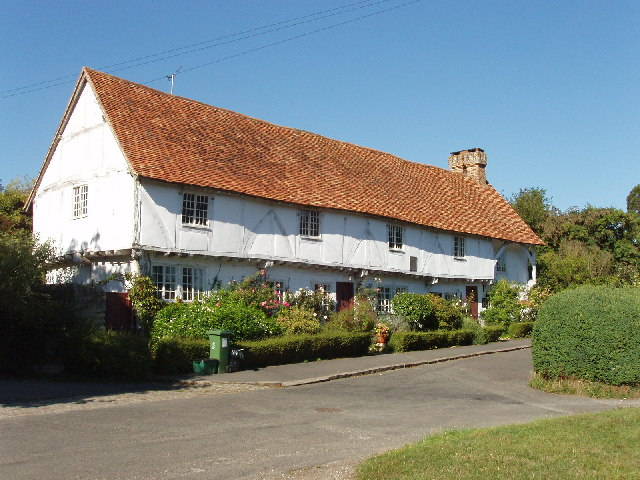
Long Crendon Courthouse

Long Crendon Courthouse is a 15th-century two-storeyed timber frame building located in the village of Long Crendon near Aylesbury, Buckinghamshire, England, and now a National Trust property and Grade II* listed building.

It is believed that the building was used as a wool store before serving to house manorial courts, which were held here from the reign of Henry V until the reign of Victoria.

The ground floor (which is now let out as a flat) was the village poor house.
