= Roald Dahl Children's Gallery =

Children's museum in Aylesbury, England

Coordinates: 51.8173°N 0.8151°W

The Roald Dahl Children's Gallery is a children's museum that uses characters and themes from the books of Roald Dahl to stimulate children's interest in science, history and literature.

It forms part of the Buckinghamshire County Museum complex on Church Street, Aylesbury, Buckinghamshire, England and was opened on 23 November 1996 by Terrence Hardiman, an actor popular with children due to his role as the title role in The Demon Headmaster.

The Roald Dahl theme is emphasised by the use of Quentin Blake graphical elements. Blake, a celebrated children's author and illustrator, is strongly associated with Dahl through his covers and illustrations for almost all modern UK editions of Dahl's books.

== See also ==
- Buckinghamshire County Museum, within the same complex as the Children's Gallery
- Roald Dahl Museum and Story Centre — which possesses Roald Dahl's manuscripts
