= King's Head Inn, Aylesbury =

English public house in Buckinghamshire, United Kingdom

Coordinates: 51.816472°N 0.813592°W

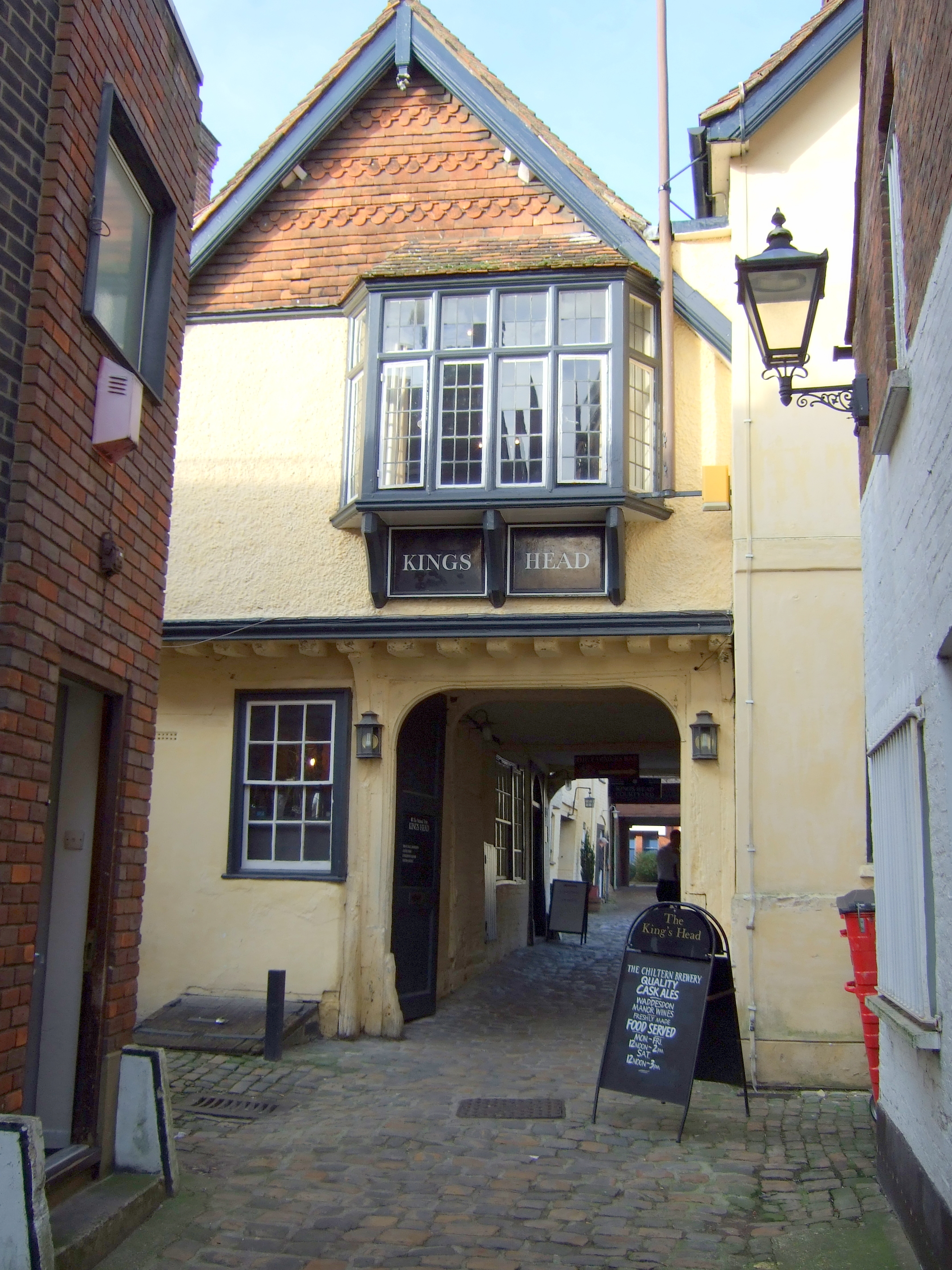
Façade of King's Head Inn

The King's Head is one of the oldest public houses with a coaching yard in the south of England. It is located in the Market Square, Aylesbury, Buckinghamshire, and is a Grade II* Listed Building.

The oldest part of the current structure of the building is of 15th-century design and the cellars are much older, dating to the 13th century.

== History ==
The history of The King's Head starts in 1455, with the first documentary reference appearing in a conveyance between William Wandeford, a London wool merchant, and Ralph Verney, a former master of the London Mercer's Company, dated 18 December 1455. It refers to the newly built 'Kyngeshede', as well as a cellar and shop, and cottages. The Great Hall is the oldest standing structure on site, dating back to the 1470s,.

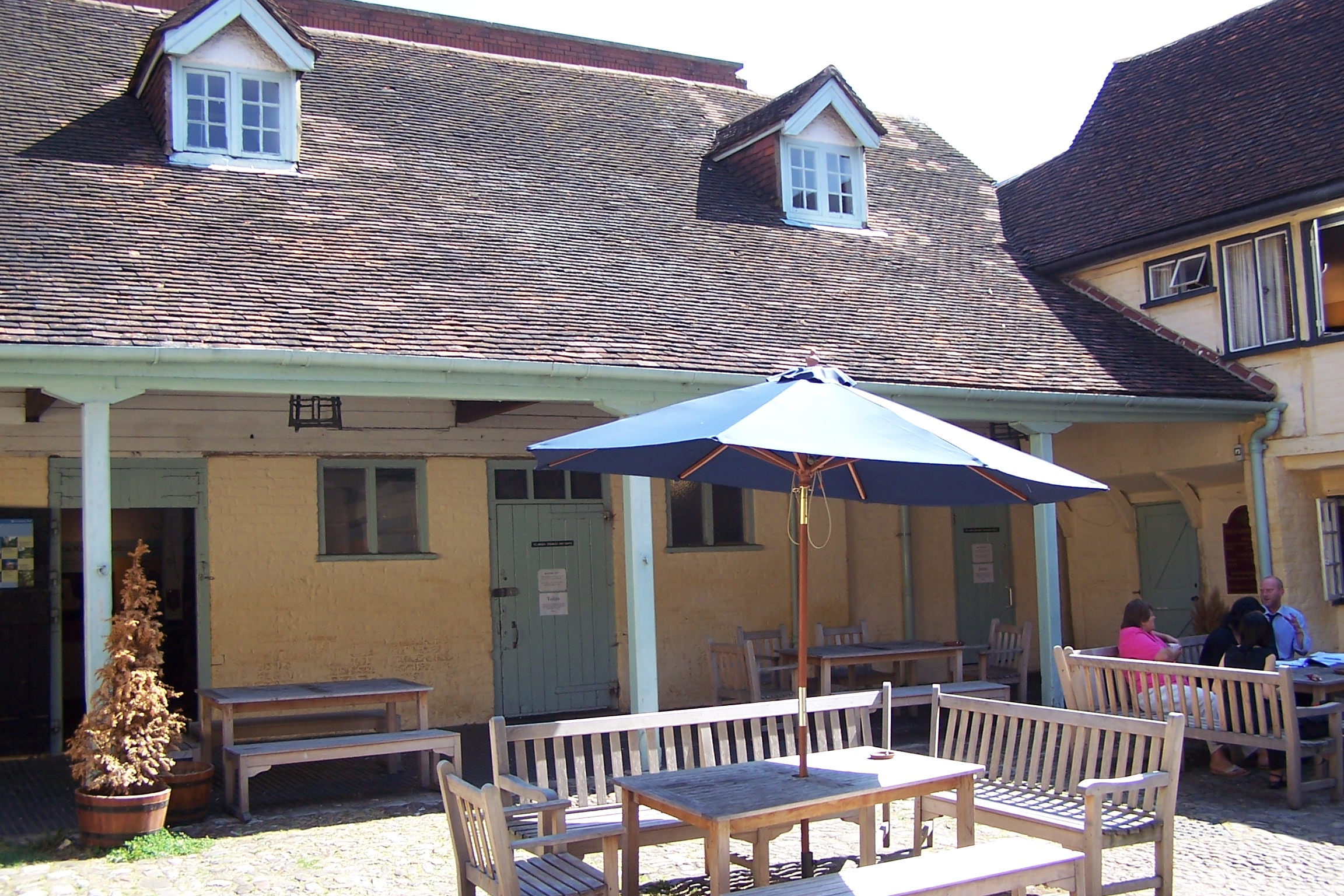
Courtyard

King Henry VI possibly stayed at the inn while on a tour of the country with his new wife Margaret of Anjou in the 15th century. Later, a stained glass panel, previously in the nearby Greyfriars monastery, was inserted in the front window of the inn showing the king and queen's individual coats of arms.

In the Great Hall wattle and daub timber construction is visible

== The National Trust ==
The property was donated to the National Trust in 1925, a fact commemorated by a plaque at the site.
