= Boarstall Tower =

Grade I listed historic house museum in Aylesbury Vale, United Kingdom

- Near Boarstall, Buckinghamshire in England
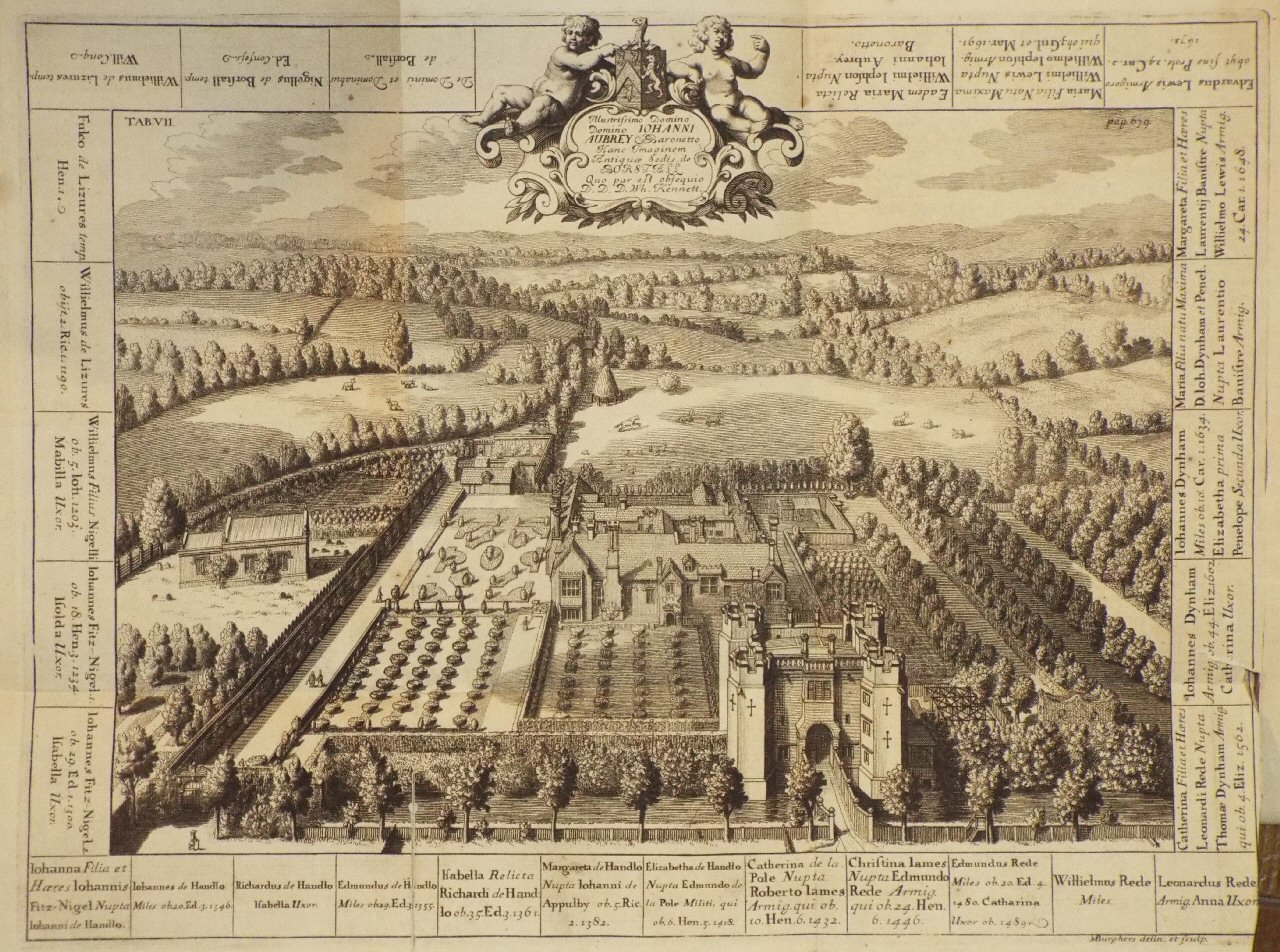

Site information
- Type: moated gatehouse
- Owner: National Trust
- Open to the public: Wednesday afternoons

Location
- Shown within Buckinghamshire
- Coordinates: 51°49′24″N 001°05′44″W

Site history
- Built: 1312
- In use: 1312-Unknown

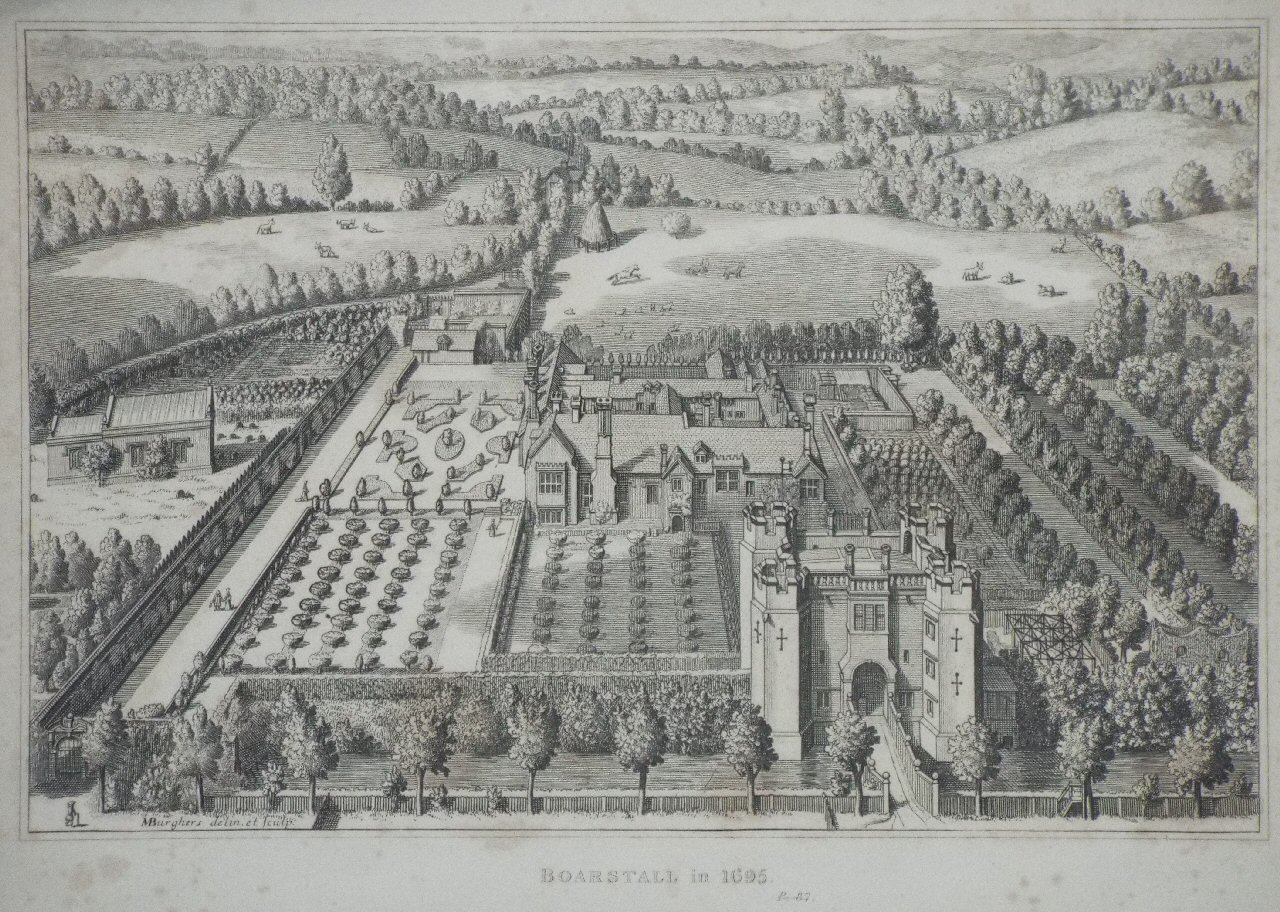
Boarstall Hall and Towers, 1695, by artist Michael Burghers, England

Boarstall Tower is a 14th-century moated gatehouse located in Boarstall, Buckinghamshire, England, and now, with its surrounding gardens, a National Trust property.

Until March 2020, the National Trust offered tours on Wednesday afternoons. The tower was closed during the Covid pandemic but recently reopened for selective dates in the summer.

== History ==
According to legend King Edward the Confessor gave some land to one of his men in return for slaying a wild boar that had infested the nearby Bernwood Forest. The man built himself a mansion on this land and called it "Boar-stall" (Old English for 'Boar House') in memory of the slain beast. The man, known as Neil, was also given a horn from the dead beast, and the legend says that whoever shall possess the horn shall be the lord of the manor of Boarstall.

Manorial records of 1265 show that the owner of the manor of Boarstall was the ceremonial keeper of the Bernwood Forest, suggesting a link with the earlier legend.

The manor was fortified in 1312 by the construction of a defensive gatehouse. The house was demolished in 1778 but the gatehouse, very large and grand for its time, survives relatively unaltered. In the English Civil War this was made into a garrison by King Charles I who was in possession of the nearby village of Brill. When Brill fell in 1643, so did the garrison at Boarstall. However whereas the manor at Brill was destroyed in the fighting, the fortified manor at Boarstall was saved, and used as a garrison by John Hampden's men, from which they were able to attack Royalist Oxford, 8 miles (13 km) away.

Having no further use for the manor in 1644, Hampden left to go and fight elsewhere. The house was then taken back for the Royalists by Colonel Henry Gage, whom it is said launched such heavy fire from his cannons against the house that the incumbent Penelope, Lady Dynham, was forced to evacuate and steal away in disguise. Gage left a small garrison in place to defend the house.

In May 1645 the house was attacked again by the Parliamentarian forces, this time led by Sir Thomas Fairfax, but he was unsuccessful. The following year in 1646 Fairfax returned, and the house was surrendered to him on 10 June, after a siege of 18 hours. The Dynham family later recovered possession of Boarstall; they were fortunate in having relatives who were close to Oliver Cromwell.

The Magna Britannia of 1806 noted that the current incumbent of the manor, Sir John Aubrey, 6th Baronet, was in possession of a large horn

"of a dark brown colour, variegated and veined like tortoise-shell. It is two feet four inches in length, on the convex bend, the diameter of the larger end is three inches; at each end it is tipt with silver, gilt, and has a wreath of leather, by which it is hung about the neck".

Boarstall Tower was given to the National Trust by the philanthropist Ernest Cook, founder of the Ernest Cook Trust.

== See also ==
- Castles in Great Britain and Ireland
- List of castles in England
