= Discover Bucks Museum =

Museum in Aylesbury, England

Coordinates: 51.8172°N 0.8151°W

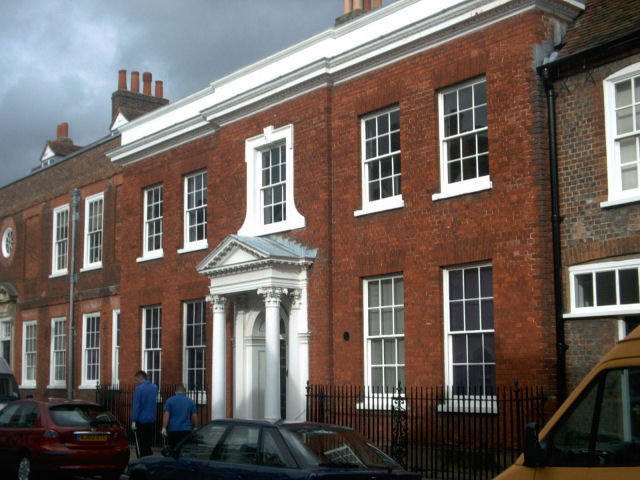
- Ceely House
- Formation: 1907
- Type: Charity
- Registration no.: 1153345
- Purpose: To promote and record the heritage of Buckinghamshire
- Headquarters: Church Street, Aylesbury, Buckinghamshire, UK
- Region served: Buckinghamshire, England
- Fields: Heritage
- Website: www.discoverbucksmuseum.org

Discover Bucks Museum, formerly the Buckinghamshire County Museum, is a museum in the centre of Aylesbury, in Buckinghamshire, England. It displays artefacts pertinent to the history of Buckinghamshire including geological displays, costume, agriculture and industry. The museum also features changing art exhibits in the Buckinghamshire Art Gallery.

== History ==
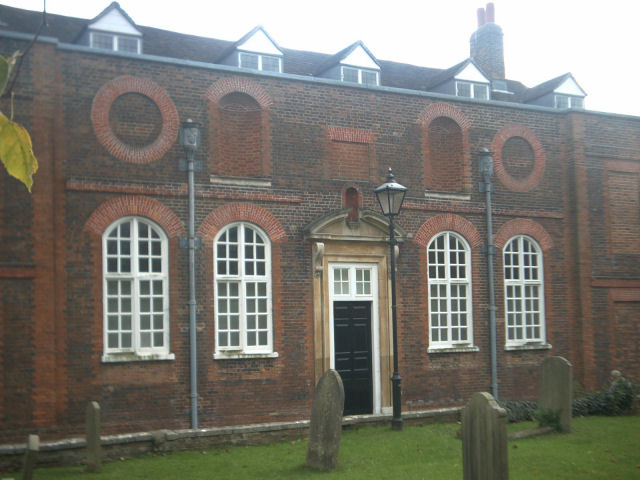
The old Aylesbury Grammar School building that forms part of the museum

The oldest part of the museum complex is Ceely House which was built for the Fraternity of the Virgin Mary and dates back to 1473. It is a red brick building and features a fine porch formed by a pair of Corinthian order columns supporting an entablature and a modillioned pediment: it is a Grade II* listed building. It was bought by a medical doctor, James Henry Ceely, in 1866, and then by another medical doctor, John Baker, in around 1901.

The adjacent building to the northwest of Ceely House is the old Aylesbury Grammar School which opened in October 1720. The design involved a symmetrical main frontage of five bays facing towards St Mary the Virgin's Church. It is also a Grade II* listed building. After the school moved to Walton Road in 1907, its former premises became available and the Bucks Archaeological Society acquired the building and established the museum there later that year. In 1957, Buckinghamshire County Council took over management of the museum and the council subsequently acquired Ceely House from the Baker family for use as an art gallery, which was also to form part of the museum.

In 1996 the museum was awarded National Heritage Museum of the Year.

To the rear of the building, in what used to be Ceely House's coach house, the Roald Dahl Children's Gallery opened in November 1996.

The museum changed its name from the Buckinghamshire County Museum to Discover Bucks Museum in June 2021.

In March 2026, the museum put on an exhibition about the Saxons, using archaelogical material from local burial sites in Wendover, Taplow and Marlow. These included several items from the Saxon era which had been found in Buckinghamshire but which had been loaned to the exhibition by the British Museum.
