= Pitstone Windmill =

17th-century windmill in Buckinghamshire, England

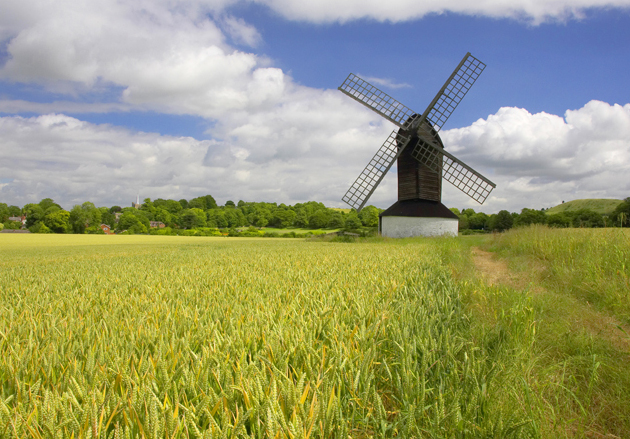
- The windmill in 2008
- Interactive map of Pitstone Windmill

Origin
- Grid reference: SP 945 147
- Coordinates: 51.8317°N 0.6299°W
- Year built: 1627

Information
- Purpose: Corn mill
- Type: Post mill
- Roundhouse storeys: Single storey roundhouse
- No. of sails: Four
- Type of sails: Common sails
- Winding: Tailpole
- Other information: Grade II* listed building

Pitstone Windmill is a Grade II* listed windmill in England. It is thought to have been built in the early 17th century, and stands in the northeastern corner of a large field near the parish boundary of Ivinghoe and Pitstone in Buckinghamshire. The windmill belongs to the National Trust.

== History ==
It is thought to have been first built circa 1627 as this date is carved on part of the framework. This is the earliest date to be found on any windmill in the British Isles. It should be remembered that such a structure would have needed frequent repairs, so the mill may predate 1627. It was dendrochronologically dated in 2004 by Dr. Martin Bridge of the Oxford Dendrochronology Laboratory when the oldest pieces in the buck were found to be from trees felled in winter 1595/96 and spring 1597. The 'new' crown tree was made from a tree that felled in spring 1670, while the quarter bars of the trestle were from trees felled between 1824 and 1826, so like most mills, it is a mix of old timbers variously recycled or hanging on from their original use.

For nearly three hundred years grain grown in the two adjoining villages was ground at the mill into flour. In 1874 the mill was bought by Adelbert Wellington Brownlow Cust, 3rd Earl Brownlow who owned the nearby Ashridge Estate. He subsequently left it to a local farmer, who ran a successful milling business from the mill.

In 1902, the mill was damaged beyond economic repair during an enormous gale. Around 1922, the derelict ruined mill was bought from the Ashridge Estate by a farmer whose land was close to the mill. In 1937, he donated it to the National Trust. However, it was not until 1963 that a band of volunteers began to carry out renovations at their own expense. The mill appeared in an episode of The Champions entitled "The Invisible Man", which was filmed in 1967. In 1970, after an interlude of 68 years, the mill once again ground corn.

Today the windmill is open to the public on Summer Friday afternoons.

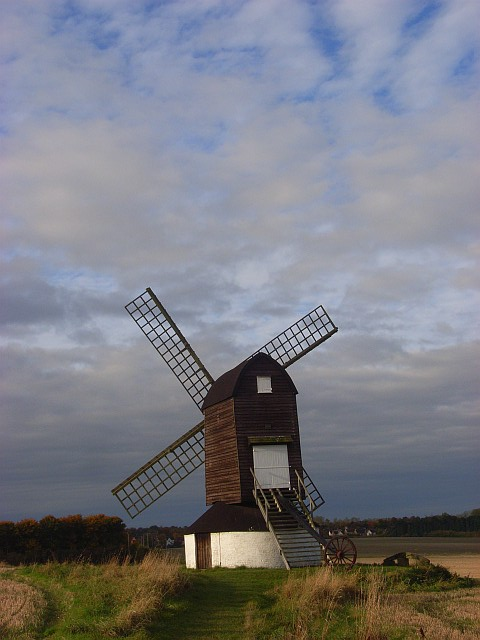
Rear view of Pitstone Windmill showing the rotation wheel

== Design ==
Pitstone is a post mill, with the superstructure of the mill resting on a central post. The post rises from ground level, passing through a brick foundation chamber. The post is the pivot for the wooden body and sails above the chamber. The body and sails can be turned to face the direction of the wind. Reinforcements added in the 20th century prevented the upper section from turning. The mill machinery in the rotating section was reached by a flight of external steps.
