= Quainton =

Village in Buckinghamshire, England

Coordinates: 51.874°N 0.916°W

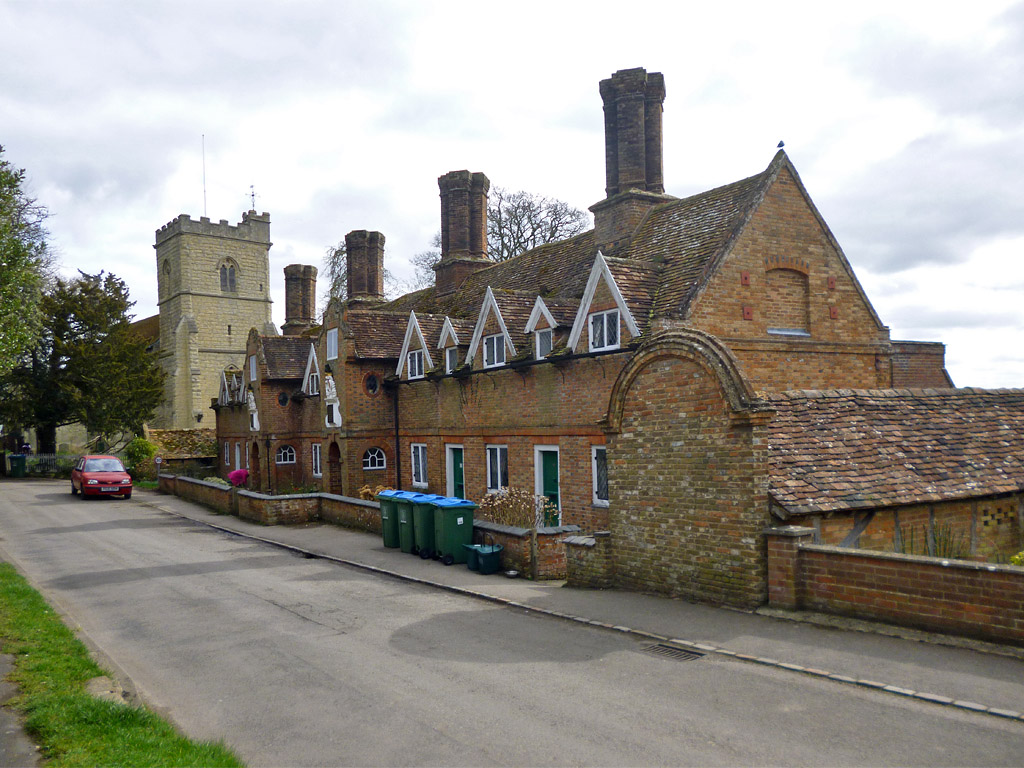
- Quainton church and 17th-century Winwood Almshouses

- Location within Buckinghamshire
- Population: 1,292 (2011)
- OS grid reference: SP745201
  - London: 42.6 miles (68.6 km) SE
- Civil parish: Quainton
- Unitary authority: Buckinghamshire
- Ceremonial county: Buckinghamshire
- Region: South East
- Country: England
- Sovereign state: United Kingdom
- Post town: AYLESBURY
- Postcode district: HP22
- Dialling code: 01296
- Police: Thames Valley
- Fire: Buckinghamshire
- Ambulance: South Central
- UK Parliament: Buckingham and Bletchley

Quainton (formerly Quainton Malet) is a village and civil parish in Buckinghamshire, England, 7 miles (11 km) north-west of Aylesbury. The population of the civil parish at the 2011 Census was 1,295. The village has two churches (Anglican and Baptist), a school and one public house. The location means that while many commute to London, others are employed in neighbouring towns and villages.

== Early history ==
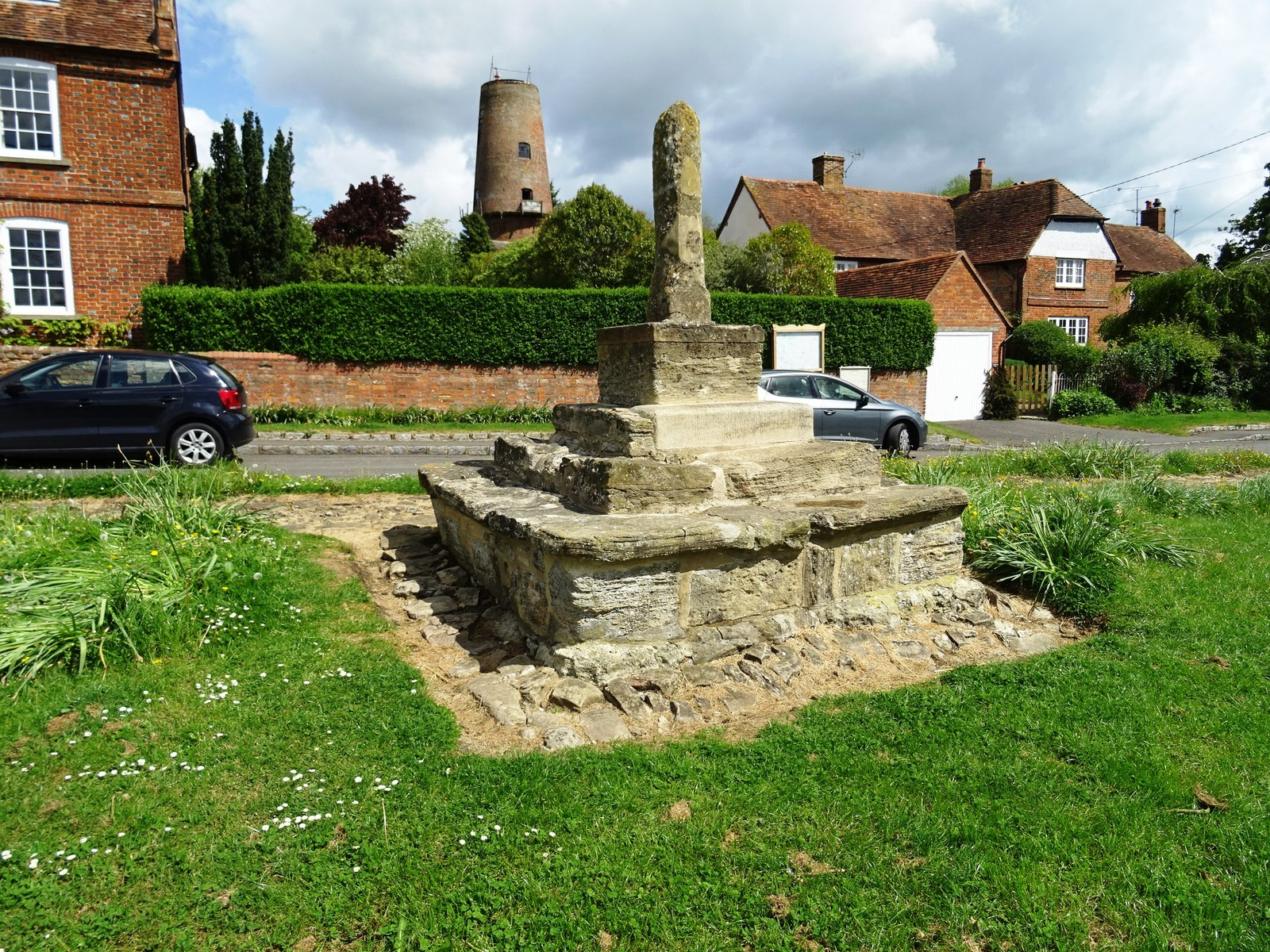
The remains of the preaching cross on the Village Green.

Its name is Old English and means Queen's Estate (cwen tun). It is not known to which queen this refers, but possibly the queen was Edith, the wife of Edward the Confessor. Known as "Fair Edith", she held manors in this part of Buckinghamshire, including a hunting lodge at Mentmore. Edward the Confessor had a palace at nearby Brill.

The former suffix Malet refers to the Malet family who were lords of the manor from 1066 until about 1348. At least one member went on the crusades, and had associations with the Hospitallers, the organisation credited with rebuilding Quainton church around 1340. The Hospitallers erected the cross on the village green, the base and shaft of which still remain.

== Historic buildings ==
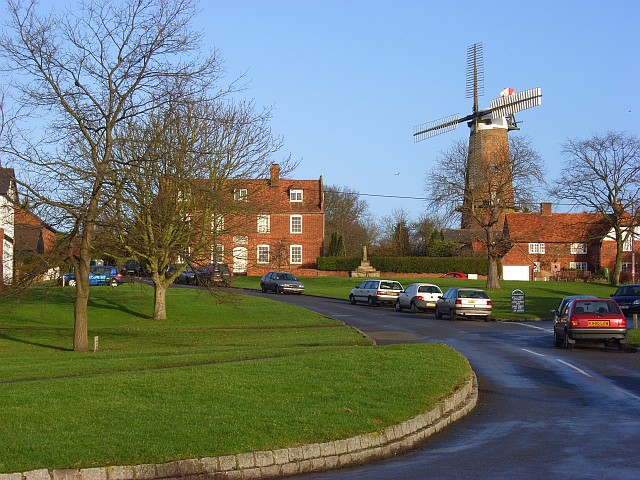
Quainton Village Green with Quainton Windmill in the distance, one of the most visible buildings in the village.

The parish church is dedicated to St Mary and the Holy Cross. It is a 14th-century building of the style of Gothic architecture known as Decorated. The west tower was built later in the 15th century. The church contains many memorial brasses and sculpture, including the 1689 tomb of Sir Richard Winwood, carved by Thomas Stayner. The stone effigies depict the deceased lying in full armour, while his widow, Ann, who paid for the tomb, rests beside him, half sitting regarding her husband. In the chancel are a reredos and sedilia by William White who was responsible for the heavy Victorian restoration and rebuilding of the chancel in 1877. The church also contains Victorian stained glass windows.

Richard Brett, a former rector and translator of the King James Bible, is buried in the chancel.

Close by the church is the former rectory, a large house described by Pevsner as of vitreous red brick. The principal façade has a three–bayed centre and two canted bays. The house contains 16th-century linenfold panelling.

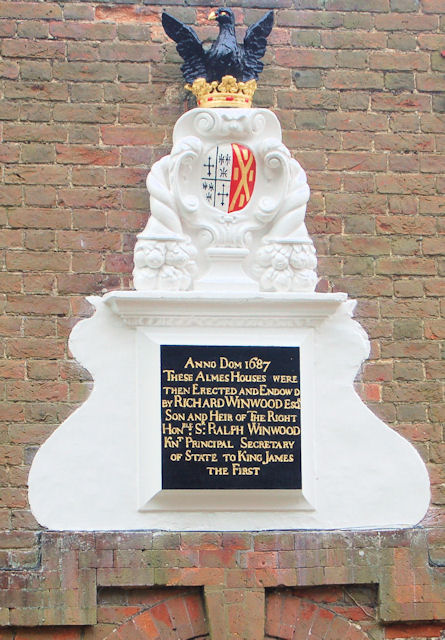
The plaque on the porch of the Almshouses reads: :Anno Domini 1687 —- These Alms houses were - then erected endowed - by Richard Winwood Esq. - son, heir of the Rt. Honourable - Sir Ralph Winwood Knight - Principal Secretary of State - to King James I

=== Winwood Almshouses ===
The Winwood Almshouses were built to house the poor, their Gothic style of architecture belying the construction date of 1687. They are a terrace of eight small cottages, one storey high with a row of dormers in the attics. These attic windows have alternating small and large gables. The terrace is decorated by two porches, with a plaque above. The almshouses are further adorned by diagonally placed chimney stacks.

=== Quainton Windmill ===
One of the most visible buildings is the 70 ft high Quainton Windmill, built in 1830–32. Derelict for the greater part of the 20th century, it was restored in 1997 and can grind wheat into flour, with further restoration ongoing.

== Other features ==
The local headquarters of the RSPCA is located just outside the village. Denham Farm, once one of the largest beef cattle farms in Buckinghamshire, ceased operation in the late 1990s, and the farmhouse has since become a private residence.

== Education ==
Quainton Church of England Combined School is a mixed Church of England primary school. It is a voluntary controlled school, which takes children from 4 to 11. The school currently has around 185 pupils.

== Transport ==
=== Rail ===
Quainton's nearest National Rail station is Aylesbury Vale Parkway, about 5 miles away. Quainton was once linked to London by train from Quainton Road station to Marylebone and Baker Street; in the opposite direction travel was available to Rugby, Verney Junction and elsewhere. Passenger services ceased in 1963, but trains from Aylesbury run to connect with events at the Buckinghamshire Railway Centre at Quainton Road station on some bank holidays. The station was also once a junction for the light railway (closed in 1936), sometimes known as the Brill Tramway, connecting Quainton with Brill.

=== Buses ===
Quainton is served by Red Rose's 16 service between Aylesbury and Steeple Claydon via Aylesbury Vale Parkway station. There around 5 buses daily in each direction on Mondays to Fridays and a reduced service on Saturdays.

== Notable people ==
- Ruth Goodman (born 1963), historian and television presenter
- Joseph Mayett (1783–1839), Autobiography, Joseph Mayett of Quainton
- Mark Smith (born 1965), The Man in Seat Sixty-One
- Hilda Mary Woods MBE (1892–1971), statistician
