= Grade I listed buildings in Buckinghamshire =

Buckinghamshire shown in England

There are approximately 372,905 listed buildings in England and 2.5% of these are Grade I. This page is a list of these buildings in the county of Buckinghamshire, by district.

== Aylesbury Vale ==
Name	Location	Type	Completed (Note: The date given is the date used by Historic England as significant for the initial building or that of an important part in the structure's description.)	Date designated	Grid ref. (Note: The grid reference is based on the British national grid reference system, sometimes known as OSGB36, used by the Ordnance Survey.) Geo-coordinates	Entry number (Note: The "List Entry Number" is a unique number assigned to each listed building and scheduled monument by Historic England.)	Image
Church of St Cecilia	Adstock, Aylesbury Vale	Parish church	12th century	13 July 1966	SP7350930110; 51°57′53″N 0°55′53″W	1288520	Church of St Cecilia More images
Church of St Mary the Virgin	Ashendon	Parish church	Early 12th century	21 December 1967	SP7051114214; 51°49′20″N 0°58′42″W	1118370	Church of St Mary the Virgin More images
Church of St Mary	Aylesbury	Church	13th century	7 April 1952	SP8170713913; 51°49′04″N 0°48′58″W	1160522	Church of St Mary More images
Church of St James	Bierton, Bierton with Broughton	Parish church	14th century	21 December 1967	SP8361615261; 51°49′47″N 0°47′17″W	1160435	Church of St James More images
Boarstall Tower	Boarstall	House	Early 14th century	25 October 1951	SP6242014248; 51°49′24″N 1°05′45″W	1124280	Boarstall Tower More images
Castle House	Buckingham	Timber-framed house	Late 15th century	13 October 1952	SP6940834015; 52°00′01″N 0°59′25″W	1282698	Castle House More images
St Peter and St Paul, Buckingham	Buckingham	Church	1777–80	13 October 1952	SP6946833780; 51°59′53″N 0°59′22″W	1282713	St Peter and St Paul, Buckingham More images
Thornborough Bridge	Buckingham	Bridge	14th century	25 September 1951	SP7292533163; 51°59′32″N 0°56′22″W	1276995	Thornborough Bridge More images
Thornborough Bridge (the part in Buckingham Civil Parish)	Buckingham	Bridge	15th century	13 October 1952	SP7292633163; 51°59′32″N 0°56′22″W	1201358	Thornborough Bridge (the part in Buckingham Civil Parish) More images
Church of St Mary and St Nicholas	Chetwode	Parish church	Early English	13 July 1966	SP6404329800; 51°57′47″N 1°04′10″W	1211496	Church of St Mary and St Nicholas More images
Church of St Mary	Chilton	Parish church	12th century	21 December 1967	SP6867411608; 51°47′56″N 1°00′20″W	1118356	Church of St Mary More images
Manor House	Creslow	House	c.1330	25 October 1951	SP8116821837; 51°53′21″N 0°49′19″W	1117837	Manor House More images
Church of Saints Peter and Paul	Dinton, Dinton-with-Ford and Upton	Parish church	12th century	21 December 1967	SP7668311069; 51°47′35″N 0°53′22″W	1319069	Church of Saints Peter and Paul More images
Dorton House	Dorton	Country house	1626	25 October 1951	SP6791713894; 51°49′10″N 1°00′58″W	1124266	Dorton House More images
Church of St Mary	Drayton Beauchamp	Parish church	15th century	21 December 1967	SP9016011884; 51°47′54″N 0°41′38″W	1124210	Church of St Mary More images
Church of St Mary	Edlesborough	Parish church	13th century	18 October 1966	SP9700419061; 51°51′42″N 0°35′34″W	1117908	Church of St Mary More images
Church of St Mary	Church End, Haddenham	Parish church	12th century	21 December 1967	SP7416508002; 51°45′57″N 0°55′36″W	1118285	Church of St Mary More images
Church of All Saints	Hillesden	Parish church	Mid-15th century	13 July 1966	SP6856928753; 51°57′11″N 1°00′13″W	1288641	Church of All Saints More images
Church of St Nicholas	Ickford	Parish church	12th century	21 December 1967	SP6459407372; 51°45′41″N 1°03′56″W	1159739	Church of St Nicholas More images
Church of St Mary	Ivinghoe	Parish church	13th century	18 October 1966	SP9455316177; 51°50′10″N 0°37′45″W	1117874	Church of St Mary More images
Tythrop Park	Kingsey	Country house	Early 17th century	26 August 1949	SP7395307022; 51°45′25″N 0°55′48″W	1159819	Tythrop Park More images
Church of St Mary	Leckhampstead, Buckinghamshire	Parish church	Norman	13 July 1966	SP7264037918; 52°02′06″N 0°56′33″W	1214985	Church of St Mary More images
Church of St Nicholas	Lillingstone Dayrell with Luffield Abbey	Parish church	Norman	13 July 1966	SP7052839821; 52°03′08″N 0°58′22″W	1215097	Church of St Nicholas More images
Church of St Mary	Lillingstone Lovell	Parish church	Early 13th century	13 July 1966	SP7124540491; 52°03′30″N 0°57′44″W	1215187	Church of St Mary More images
Church of St Mary	Church End, Long Crendon	Church	13th century	21 December 1967	SP6984009060; 51°46′33″N 0°59′21″W	1214036	Church of St Mary More images
Notley Abbey House	Long Crendon	House	c.1162	25 October 1951	SP7154709197; 51°46′37″N 0°57′52″W	1213476	Notley Abbey House More images
Notley Abbey House Barn	Long Crendon	Barn	13th century	25 October 1951	SP7158009183; 51°46′36″N 0°57′50″W	1213478	Notley Abbey House Barn More images
Notley Abbey House Enclosing wall	Long Crendon	Wall	13th century	19 June 1981	SP7156909222; 51°46′38″N 0°57′51″W	1289101	Upload Photo
Dovecote to north-east of Notley Farm	Long Crendon	Dovecote	14th century	25 October 1951	SP7140509317; 51°46′41″N 0°57′59″W	1289102	Dovecote to north-east of Notley Farm More images
Church of St Mary	Ludgershall	Parish church	Early 14th century	21 December 1967	SP6598917204; 51°50′58″N 1°02′36″W	1124276	Church of St Mary More images
Church of St Edmund	Maids Moreton	Parish church	15th century	13 July 1966	SP7063835166; 52°00′38″N 0°58′20″W	1215188	Church of St Edmund More images
Mentmore Towers	Mentmore	Country house	1851	26 September 1951	SP9025119659; 51°52′06″N 0°41′26″W	1117863	Mentmore Towers More images
Church of All Saints	Claydon Park, Middle Claydon	Parish church	c.1300	13 July 1966	SP7189825296; 51°55′18″N 0°57′21″W	1214762	Church of All Saints More images
Claydon House	Claydon Park, Middle Claydon	House	1771	25 September 1951	SP7191725334; 51°55′19″N 0°57′20″W	1288461	Claydon House More images
Nether Winchendon House	Lower Winchendon, Nether Winchendon	Country house	15th century	25 October 1951	SP7344512077; 51°48′09″N 0°56′11″W	1319088	Nether Winchendon House More images
Church of St Nicholas	Lower Winchendon, Nether Winchendon	Parish church	13th century	21 December 1967	SP7326912252; 51°48′15″N 0°56′20″W	1159892	Church of St Nicholas More images
Church of St Faith	Newton Longville	Parish church	12th century	19 August 1959	SP8477431422; 51°58′29″N 0°46′02″W	1216499	Church of St Faith More images
Church of St Mary	North Marston	Parish church	13th century	19 August 1959	SP7770522700; 51°53′51″N 0°52′20″W	1213264	Church of St Mary More images
Church of St Mary	Pitstone	Parish church	Mid-13th century	18 October 1966	SP9423114937; 51°49′30″N 0°38′03″W	1117829	Church of St Mary More images
Church of St Mary and the Holy Cross	Quainton	Parish church	14th century	21 December 1967	SP7499920155; 51°52′30″N 0°54′43″W	1319285	Church of St Mary and the Holy Cross More images
Church of St John	Radclive, Radclive-cum-Chackmore	Parish church	Transitional	13 July 1966	SP6756533925; 51°59′59″N 1°01′02″W	1211600	Church of St John More images
Church of St Michael	Stewkley	Parish church	Mid-12th century	19 August 1959	SP8521126104; 51°55′37″N 0°45′44″W	1214007	Church of St Michael More images
Hartwell House	Hartwell, Stone with Bishopstone and Hartwell	Country house	Early 17th century	25 October 1951	SP7960112451; 51°48′18″N 0°50′49″W	1118471	Hartwell House More images
Stowe House	Stowe	Country house	1680	25 September 1951	SP6746337436; 52°01′52″N 1°01′05″W	1289788	Stowe House More images
Arches at each end of north front of Stowe House	Stowe	Wall	c.1740	25 September 1951	SP6735437459; 52°01′53″N 1°01′11″W	1211919	Arches at each end of north front of Stowe House More images
Captain Cook's Monument	Stowe Gardens, Stowe	Monument	c.1740	13 July 1966	SP6774237338; 52°01′49″N 1°00′50″W	1211939	Captain Cook's Monument More images
Dido's Cave	Stowe Gardens, Stowe	Garden building	1727	13 July 1966	SP6740837189; 52°01′44″N 1°01′08″W	1212154	Dido's Cave More images
Equestrian statue of George I	Stowe Gardens, Stowe	Statue	1723	25 September 1951	SP6743737502; 52°01′55″N 1°01′06″W	1211872	Equestrian statue of George I More images
Lord Cobham's Column	Stowe Gardens, Stowe	Column	Post c.1740	25 September 1951	SP6792037774; 52°02′03″N 1°00′41″W	1289781	Lord Cobham's Column More images
Queen Caroline's Monument	Stowe Gardens, Stowe	Commemorative monument	c.1725	13 July 1966	SP6717336907; 52°01′35″N 1°01′21″W	1212190	Queen Caroline's Monument More images
The Boycott Pavilions	Stowe Gardens, Stowe	House	c.1728	25 September 1951	SP6680537034; 52°01′40″N 1°01′40″W	1289656	The Boycott Pavilions More images
The Cascade	Stowe Gardens, Stowe	Cascade	1760s	13 July 1966	SP6765636954; 52°01′37″N 1°00′55″W	1211949	The Cascade More images
The Congreve Monument	Stowe Gardens, Stowe	Obelisk	c.1737	25 September 1951	SP6783737062; 52°01′40″N 1°00′46″W	1289751	The Congreve Monument More images
The Corinthian Arch	Stowe Gardens, Stowe	Arch	1765	13 July 1966	SP6806036302; 52°01′16″N 1°00′34″W	1212239	The Corinthian Arch More images
The Doric Arch	Stowe Gardens, Stowe	Arch	1767	25 September 1951	SP6766037176; 52°01′44″N 1°00′55″W	1212030	The Doric Arch More images
The Fane of Pastoral Poetry	Stowe Gardens, Stowe	Belvedere	1727–28	13 July 1966	SP6774038126; 52°02′15″N 1°00′50″W	1289758	The Fane of Pastoral Poetry More images
The Gothic Temple	Stowe Gardens, Stowe	Pavilion	1748	25 September 1951	SP6791037444; 52°01′53″N 1°00′41″W	1211945	The Gothic Temple More images
The Grenville Column	Stowe Gardens, Stowe	Column	c.1748	13 July 1966	SP6767437374; 52°01′50″N 1°00′54″W	1289782	The Grenville Column More images
The Hermitage	Stowe Gardens, Stowe	Garden feature	Pre-1732	13 July 1966	SP6754636835; 52°01′33″N 1°01′01″W	1289654	The Hermitage More images
The Lake Pavilions	Stowe Gardens, Stowe	Pavilion	c.1730	13 July 1966	SP6771836878; 52°01′34″N 1°00′52″W	1212104	The Lake Pavilions More images
The Oxford Bridge	Stowe Gardens, Stowe	Ornamental bridge	1761	25 September 1951	SP6669936794; 52°01′32″N 1°01′45″W	1212221	The Oxford Bridge More images
The Oxford Gates	Stowe Gardens, Stowe	Gate lodge	c.1730	25 September 1951	SP6660836663; 52°01′28″N 1°01′50″W	1212155	The Oxford Gates More images
The Palladian Bridge	Stowe Gardens, Stowe	Bridge	1738	25 September 1951	SP6800437191; 52°01′44″N 1°00′37″W	1289750	The Palladian Bridge More images
The Queen's Temple	Stowe Gardens, Stowe	Garden temple	1770	25 September 1951	SP6772337696; 52°02′01″N 1°00′51″W	1211938	The Queen's Temple More images
The Rotondo	Stowe Gardens, Stowe	Rotunda	1721	25 September 1951	SP6738737109; 52°01′42″N 1°01′09″W	1289655	The Rotondo More images
The Temple of Ancient Virtue	Stowe Gardens, Stowe	Garden temple	1730s	25 September 1951	SP6764637296; 52°01′48″N 1°00′55″W	1289786	The Temple of Ancient Virtue More images
The Temple of British Worthies	Stowe Gardens, Stowe	Garden temple	c.1735	25 September 1951	SP6777437264; 52°01′47″N 1°00′49″W	1211946	The Temple of British Worthies More images
The Temple of Concord and Victory	Stowe Gardens, Stowe	Garden temple	1749	25 September 1951	SP6750637709; 52°02′01″N 1°01′03″W	1289755	The Temple of Concord and Victory More images
The Temple of Friendship	Stowe Gardens, Stowe	Garden temple	1739	25 September 1951	SP6801836992; 52°01′38″N 1°00′36″W	1211947	The Temple of Friendship More images
The Temple of Venus	Stowe Gardens, Stowe	Garden temple	c.1732	25 September 1951	SP6740736661; 52°01′27″N 1°01′08″W	1212153	The Temple of Venus More images
Wolfe Obelisk	Stowe	Obelisk	c.1760	13 July 1966	SP6746938661; 52°02′32″N 1°01′04″W	1211785	Wolfe Obelisk More images
Church of St Michael	Thornton	Church	14th century	13 July 1966	SP7521036233; 52°01′10″N 0°54′19″W	1232799	Church of St Michael More images
Church of St Mary	Twyford	Parish church	12th century	13 July 1966	SP6651126670; 51°56′04″N 1°02′02″W	1215009	Church of St Mary More images
Church of St Mary Magdalene	Upper Winchendon	Parish church	12th century	21 December 1967	SP7459614494; 51°49′27″N 0°55′09″W	1124721	Church of St Mary Magdalene More images
Waddesdon Manor	Waddesdon Manor Grounds, Waddesdon	Country house	1874–83	21 December 1967	SP7331116514; 51°50′33″N 0°56′14″W	1117804	Waddesdon Manor More images
Church of St Giles	Water Stratford	Parish church	Norman	13 July 1966	SP6517034294; 52°00′12″N 1°03′07″W	1212825	Church of St Giles More images
Church of St Mary	Weston Turville	Parish church	13th century	21 December 1967	SP8593010287; 51°47′05″N 0°45′20″W	1118358	Church of St Mary More images
Church of St Mary	Whaddon	Parish church	12th century	19 August 1959	SP8053234074; 51°59′57″N 0°49′42″W	1216538	Church of St Mary More images
Church of All Saints	Wing	Parish church	10th century	18 October 1966	SP8802922582; 51°53′41″N 0°43′20″W	1320141	Church of All Saints More images
Winslow Hall	Winslow	Country house	1700	19 August 1959	SP7709027590; 51°56′29″N 0°52′48″W	1279357	Winslow Hall More images
Wotton House, with walls to pavilions	Wotton Underwood	Country house	1704–14	25 October 1951	SP6854116191; 51°50′24″N 1°00′24″W	1124221	Wotton House, with walls to pavilions More images
Wotton House Entrance gates and screen	Wotton Underwood	Gate	Early 18th century	25 October 1951	SP6859916214; 51°50′25″N 1°00′21″W	1124222	Upload Photo
Wotton House South Pavilion	Wotton Underwood	House	1704–14	25 October 1951	SP6858016165; 51°50′24″N 1°00′22″W	1332825	Wotton House South Pavilion More images
Wotton House Clock Pavilion	Wotton Underwood	House	1704–14	25 October 1951	SP6856816229; 51°50′26″N 1°00′22″W	1275066	Wotton House Clock Pavilion More images

== Chiltern ==
Name	Location	Type	Completed	Date designated	Grid ref. Geo-coordinates	Entry number	Image
Church of St Mary	Amersham	Church	13th century	22 December 1958	SU9580697380; 51°40′01″N 0°36′58″W	1124855	Church of St Mary More images
Shardeloes	Amersham	House	1758–66	22 December 1958	SU9383797811; 51°40′16″N 0°38′40″W	1238040	Shardeloes More images
Jordans Meeting House	Jordans, Chalfont St. Giles	Friends meeting house	1688	22 December 1958	SU9745291021; 51°36′35″N 0°35′39″W	1332449	Jordans Meeting House More images
Milton's Cottage	Chalfont St. Giles	Timber-framed house	Early 17th century	22 December 1958	SU9888893368; 51°37′50″N 0°34′22″W	1125006	Milton's Cottage More images
Church of St Giles	Chalfont St. Giles	Parish church	13th century	22 December 1958	SU9910293506; 51°37′54″N 0°34′10″W	1125011	Church of St Giles More images
Church of St Michael	Chenies Village, Chenies	Parish church	15th century	30 July 1984	TQ0157198364; 51°40′30″N 0°31′57″W	1158585	Church of St Michael More images
Chenies Manor House	Chenies Village, Chenies	Manor house	15th century	22 December 1958	TQ0152698312; 51°40′28″N 0°31′59″W	1332531	Chenies Manor House More images
Church of St Mary	Chesham	Church	12th century and later	10 November 1951	SP9566901522; 51°42′15″N 0°37′01″W	1124655	Church of St Mary More images
Church of St Peter and St Paul	Great Missenden	Church	14th century	22 December 1958	SP9001501026; 51°42′03″N 0°41′56″W	1124812	Church of St Peter and St Paul More images
Church of St John the Baptist	Little Missenden	Parish church	10th century	22 December 1958	SU9208798987; 51°40′56″N 0°40′10″W	1332450	Church of St John the Baptist More images
Church of Holy Trinity	Penn	Parish church	13th to 15th century	22 December 1958	SU9163193278; 51°37′51″N 0°40′39″W	1332439	Church of Holy Trinity More images
Old Church of St John the Baptist	The Lee	Parish church	13th century	22 December 1958	SP8977904385; 51°43′52″N 0°42′05″W	1124881	Old Church of St John the Baptist More images

== Milton Keynes ==
As of 2025, there are thirty Grade I listed buildings and structures in the City of Milton Keynes.

== South Bucks ==
Name	Location	Type	Completed	Date designated	Grid ref. Geo-coordinates	Entry number	Image
Burnham Abbey	Burnham	Chapter house	13th century	23 September 1955	SU9307580463; 51°30′56″N 0°39′36″W	1124475	Burnham Abbey More images
Church of St Mary	Hitcham, Burnham	Parish church	12th century	23 September 1955	SU9200182588; 51°32′05″N 0°40′30″W	1309911	Church of St Mary More images
Dropmore	Burnham	Country house	1792–95	23 September 1955	SU9266886027; 51°33′56″N 0°39′52″W	1317133	Dropmore More images
Aviary at Dropmore	Taplow	Aviary	Early 19th century	26 April 1985	SU9256386046; 51°33′57″N 0°39′57″W	1332401	Upload Photo
Huntercombe Manor	Burnham	Hall house	14th century	23 September 1955	SU9314380652; 51°31′02″N 0°39′33″W	1309887	Huntercombe Manor More images
Church of St Mary	Denham	Parish church	Norman	23 September 1955	TQ0430286993; 51°34′20″N 0°29′47″W	1309616	Church of St Mary More images
Denham Place	Denham	Country house	1688–1701	22 September 1954	TQ0393387154; 51°34′25″N 0°30′06″W	1124467	Denham Place More images
Savay Farm, The Savay	Denham	Hall house	14th century	23 September 1955	TQ0468488047; 51°34′54″N 0°29′26″W	1332700	Savay Farm, The Savay More images
Chapel of St Mary Magdalene	Boveney	Chapel	12th century	23 September 1955	SU9400277681; 51°29′25″N 0°38′51″W	1309414	Chapel of St Mary Magdalene More images
Church of St James	Dorney	Parish church	12th century	23 September 1955	SU9249379006; 51°30′09″N 0°40′08″W	1162809	Church of St James More images
Dorney Court	Dorney	Country house	c.1500	23 September 1955	SU9252479028; 51°30′09″N 0°40′06″W	1124439	Dorney Court More images
Church of St Peter	Iver	Church	11th–15th century	23 September 1955	TQ0397881172; 51°31′12″N 0°30′10″W	1332743	Church of St Peter More images
Church of St Giles	Stoke Poges	Parish church	12th–16th century	23 September 1955	SU9755482728; 51°32′06″N 0°35′42″W	1164966	Church of St Giles More images
Stoke Park	Stoke Poges	Country house	1789	23 September 1955	SU9700882653; 51°32′04″N 0°36′10″W	1332731	Stoke Park More images
Manor House	Stoke Park, Stoke Poges	Manor house	c.1550	23 September 1955	SU9753782865; 51°32′11″N 0°35′42″W	1165194	Manor House More images
Cliveden	Cliveden, Taplow	Country house	1674–77	23 September 1955	SU9102885179; 51°33′29″N 0°41′18″W	1125041	Cliveden More images
Blenheim Pavilion, Cliveden	Cliveden, Taplow	Pavilion	c.1735	23 September 1955	SU9128385563; 51°33′42″N 0°41′04″W	1125045	Blenheim Pavilion, Cliveden More images
Chapel	Cliveden, Taplow	Gazebo	c.1735	23 September 1955	SU9091785058; 51°33′26″N 0°41′24″W	1165582	Chapel More images
Terrace wall to garden front, Cliveden	Cliveden, Taplow	Terrace	Late 19th century	23 September 1955	SU9100785164; 51°33′29″N 0°41′19″W	1125044	Terrace wall to garden front, Cliveden More images
Maidenhead Bridge	Taplow	Bridge	1777	27 February 1950	SU9014581356; 51°31′26″N 0°42′07″W	1117619	Maidenhead Bridge More images
Maidenhead Railway Bridge	Taplow	Railway viaduct	1837–39 and 1890–93	26 April 1985	SU9016881045; 51°31′16″N 0°42′06″W	1125021	Maidenhead Railway Bridge More images

== Wycombe ==
Name	Location	Type	Completed	Date designated	Grid ref. Geo-coordinates	Entry number	Image
Church of the Holy Trinity	Bledlow, Bledlow-cum-Saunderton	Parish church	12th century	21 June 1955	SP7784302175; 51°42′46″N 0°52′29″W	1125801	Church of the Holy Trinity More images
Chequers	Ellesborough	Country house	1565	21 June 1955	SP8419605663; 51°44′36″N 0°46′55″W	1125879	Chequers More images
Fawley Court	Fawley	Country house	1684	7 July 1952	SU7652084214; 51°33′06″N 0°53′52″W	1125740	Fawley Court More images
Church (of St Mary Magdalene)	Little Hampden, Great and Little Hampden	Parish church	12th century	21 June 1955	SP8605203552; 51°43′27″N 0°45′20″W	1125857	Church (of St Mary Magdalene) More images
Hampden House	Great Hampden, Great and Little Hampden	Country house	Late 16th century	21 June 1955	SP8486102456; 51°42′52″N 0°46′23″W	1311378	Hampden House More images
Church of All Saints	Little Kimble, Great and Little Kimble	Church	12th century	21 June 1955	SP8265206414; 51°45′01″N 0°48′15″W	1158922	Church of All Saints More images
Church of St Nicholas	Great and Little Kimble	Parish church	13th century	21 June 1955	SP8254705966; 51°44′47″N 0°48′21″W	1311260	Church of St Nicholas More images
Harleyford Manor	Harleyford, Great Marlow	Villa	1755	29 September 1950	SU8267684492; 51°33′12″N 0°48′32″W	1311225	Harleyford Manor More images
Church of St Bartholomew	Fingest, Hambleden	Parish church	Early 12th century	21 June 1955	SU7767091149; 51°36′50″N 0°52′47″W	1125708	Church of St Bartholomew More images
Hughenden Manor	Hughenden Park, Hughenden Valley	Country house	1738	21 June 1955	SU8611995334; 51°39′01″N 0°45′24″W	1125785	Hughenden Manor More images
Marlow Bridge	Marlow	Suspension bridge	1831–36	16 July 1949	SU8511586123; 51°34′03″N 0°46′24″W	1332381	Marlow Bridge More images
Marlow Place	Marlow	House	1720	16 July 1949	SU8509586395; 51°34′12″N 0°46′25″W	1234824	Marlow Place More images
Church of St Dunstan	Monks Risborough, Princes Risborough	Parish church	Early 14th century	21 June 1955	SP8126704419; 51°43′57″N 0°49′29″W	1125811	Church of St Dunstan More images
Church of St Mary	Radnage	Parish church	Late 12th–early 13th century	21 June 1955	SU7860497948; 51°40′29″N 0°51′53″W	1310495	Church of St Mary More images
Church of St Lawrence	West Wycombe	Church	1751–63	9 January 1954	SU8273794963; 51°38′51″N 0°48′20″W	1125117	Church of St Lawrence More images
The Mausoleum	West Wycombe	Mausoleum	Early 18th century	9 January 1954	SU8278894917; 51°38′49″N 0°48′18″W	1160467	The Mausoleum More images
West Wycombe Park House	West Wycombe	House	Late 17th century or early 18th century	9 January 1954	SU8288294290; 51°38′29″N 0°48′13″W	1160521	West Wycombe Park House More images
Church of All Saints	High Wycombe	Church	Rebuilt 1273	9 January 1954	SU8656493084; 51°37′48″N 0°45′03″W	1125180	Church of All Saints More images
Guildhall	High Wycombe	Guildhall	1604	9 January 1954	SU8652293021; 51°37′46″N 0°45′05″W	1332349	Guildhall More images

== See also ==
- Grade II* listed buildings in Buckinghamshire
