= Dorton (disambiguation) =

Dorton is a village in England.

Dorton may also refer to:

- Dorton, Kentucky, an unincorporated community in southern Pike County
- Dorton Arena, in Raleigh, North Carolina
- Dorton House, a historic house in Seal, Kent
- Dorton Spa, in Buckinghamshire, England
- Eric Dorton (born 1990), American baseball coach
- Randy Dorton (1954–2004), Director of Engine Operations for Hendrick Motorsports
- Richard Dorton, plays Reptile in Mortal Kombat: Rebirth
