= Paul Odgers =

British civil servant and a British Army officer

- Born: Paul Randell Odgers; 30 July 1915; Newcastle-upon-Tyne, England
- Died: 24 December 2007 (aged 92); Birmingham, England
- Military career
- Allegiance: United Kingdom
- Branch: British Army
- Service years: 1939–1945
- Rank: Major
- Service number: 90523
- Unit: Oxford and Buckinghamshire Light Infantry
- Conflicts: Second World War; Siege of Malta; Allied invasion of Sicily; Italian campaign; Operation Overlord; Allied advance from Paris to the Rhine; Western Allied invasion of Germany
- Awards: Companion of the Order of the Bath; Member of the Order of the British Empire; mentioned in despatches (3)

Major Paul Randell Odgers, CB, MBE, TD (30 July 1915 – 24 December 2007), was a British civil servant and a British Army officer who served in the Second World War with the tactical headquarters of the Eighth Army in the Italian campaign and the 21st Army Group in north-west Europe. When he died in 2007, he was the last survivor of Field Marshal Sir Bernard Montgomery's tactical headquarters who was present at the German surrender at Lüneburg Heath.

Odgers joined the Board of Education in 1937. He was an Assistant Secretary in the Ministry of Education from 1948 to 1956, and Deputy Secretary of the Department of Education and Science under Margaret Thatcher from 1971 to 1975.

== Early life ==
Paul Randell Odgers was born on 30 July 1915, the eldest son of a surgeon who later became a reader in anatomy at Oxford University. He was educated at Rugby School, where he participated in the Junior Division of the Officers Training Corps and then entered New College, Oxford, where he read classics and modern history. He joined the civil service in the Junior Grade of the Administrative Class in the Board of Education on 28 September 1937.

== Military service ==
On 23 May 1939, Odgers was commissioned as a second lieutenant in the Oxfordshire and Buckinghamshire Light Infantry. He graduated from Staff College, Camberley, and became a staff officer with the Central Brigade in Malta. His service there was recognised with a mention in despatches, but by July 1943, there was little prospect of action there, however, Eighth Army headquarters was temporarily located in Malta for the Allied invasion of Sicily, and he approached Major Harry Llewellyn, an officer on the staff, having heard that Llewellyn was looking for liaison officers. Odgers was accepted on the recommendation of Isaiah Berlin. His service in Sicily resulted in a second mention in despatches.

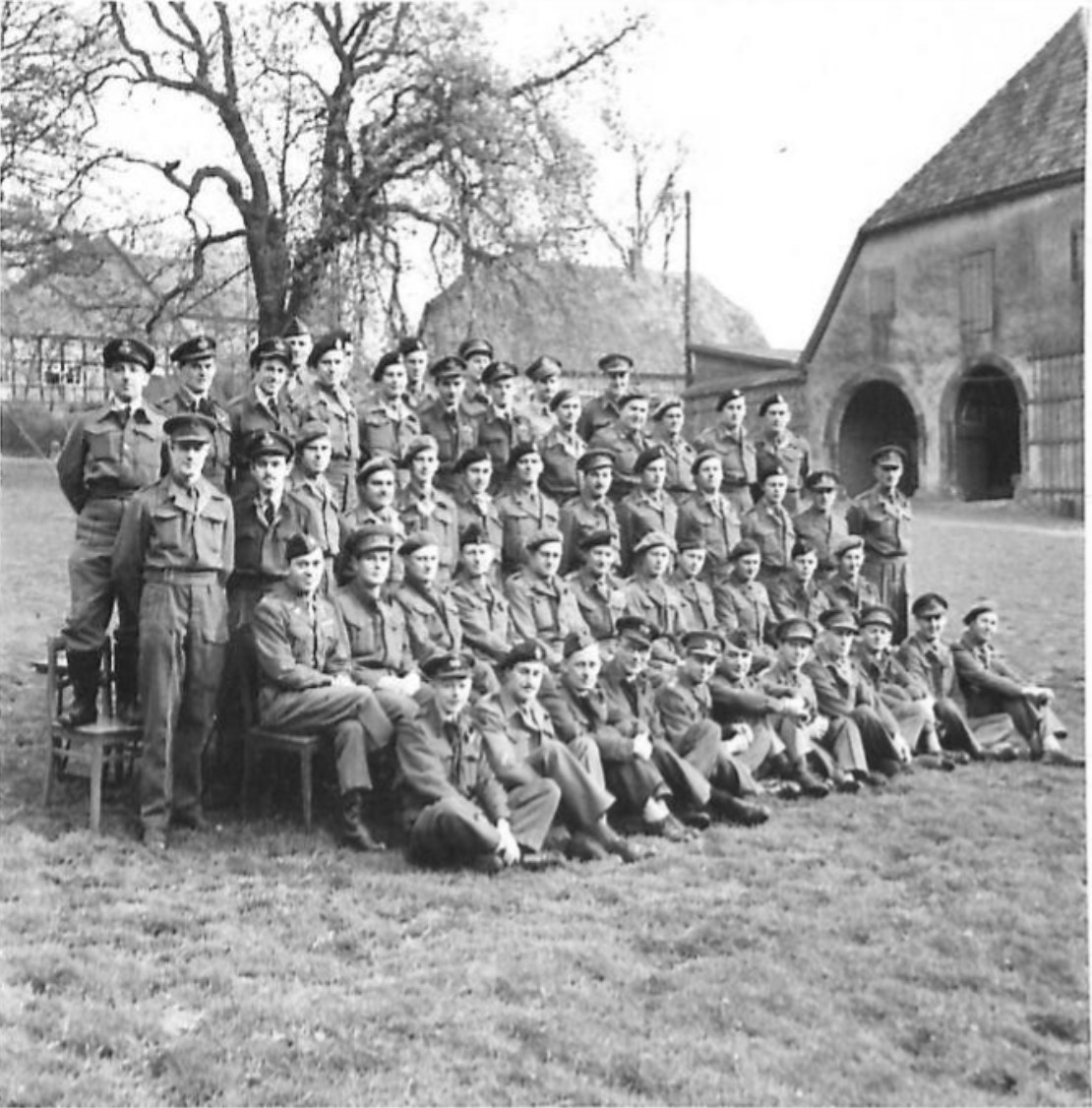
Officers of Tac HQ, 21st Army Group

The commander of the Eighth Army, General Sir Bernard Montgomery, was accustomed to commanding from a forward command post, known as Tactical Headquarters (Tac HQ). After he assumed command of the 21st Army Group in December 1943, Montgomery resolved to create a Tac HQ at 21st Army Group. His chief of staff, Major-General Freddie de Guingand had Odgers recalled from Italy in March 1944, and gave him the assignment of organising and training the Tac HQ, even though Odgers had only passing acquaintance with Eighth Army's Tac HQ, and had little personal contact with Montgomery.

By D-Day, Tac HQ had 30 officers, 85 warrant officers and 182 other ranks, a total of 297 personnel. While back in the UK, Odgers married Diana Fawkes, a sculptor. They later had two children, a boy and a girl. After a brief honeymoon, Odgers returned to Tac HQ, where he conducted exercises with Tac HQ where it conducted a series of exercises on the South Downs and at Crawley and Petworth during which Tac HQ practised packing up, moving, and setting up again.

Tac HQ crossed the English Channel in three tank landing ships, with Odgers arriving at Juno Beach on USS LST-378 on 8 June 1944. Odgers main task became scouting and selecting sites for Tac HQ. Over the next two years, it moved 27 times, covering 1,800 kilometres (1,100 mi) from Courseulles in Normandy to Lüneburg Heath in Germany, where Odgers witnessed the German surrender at Lüneburg Heath.

Odgers ended the war with the temporary rank of major. For his services in north-west Europe, he was mentioned in despatches for a third time, and made a Member of the Order of the British Empire. He left active service after the war, but remained in the Territorial Army as a reservist. He earned the Territorial Decoration for long service, and retired on 30 July 1965, having reached the mandatory retirement age, with the rank of captain, retaining the rank of major as an honorary rank.

== Civil service ==
After the war ended, Odgers returned to the Civil Service. He was an Assistant Secretary in the Ministry of Education from 1948 to 1956, serving under Mary Smieton, the first woman to become the Permanent Secretary at the Department of Education. Odgers worked in the Cabinet Office from 1956 to 1958, when he returned to the Ministry of Education as Under-Secretary. In 1967, Michael Stewart the First Secretary of State, put Odgers on his staff. He then worked for Dick Crossman in the Office of Lord President of the Council and the Office of the Secretary of State for Social Services. For his services as Under Secretary in the Office of the Secretary of State for Social Services, he was made a Companion of the Order of the Bath in the 1970 New Year Honours. He served in the Cabinet Office again from 1970 to 1971 before returning to the Department of Education and Science as Deputy Secretary from 1971 to 1975. In this role he served under the Secretary of State for Education and Science, Margaret Thatcher, and devised programmes for teacher training.

== Later life ==
After retiring from the Civil Service in 1975, Odgers served on the council of the Girls Public Day School Trust. He was also the treasurer and vice-president of the Society for the Promotion of Roman Studies. He moved to Haddenham, Buckinghamshire, where he was involved in local activities, including being a school governor, and the chairman of appeal for the restoration of the tower of St Mary's Church, Haddenham. He also owned a house near the Pont du Gard in southern France.

Odgers died on 24 December 2007, at the age of 92. He was the last survivor of Tac HQ who had been present at the German surrender at Lüneburg Heath.
