= Notley Farm dovecote =

Coordinates: 51.7780°N 0.9664°W

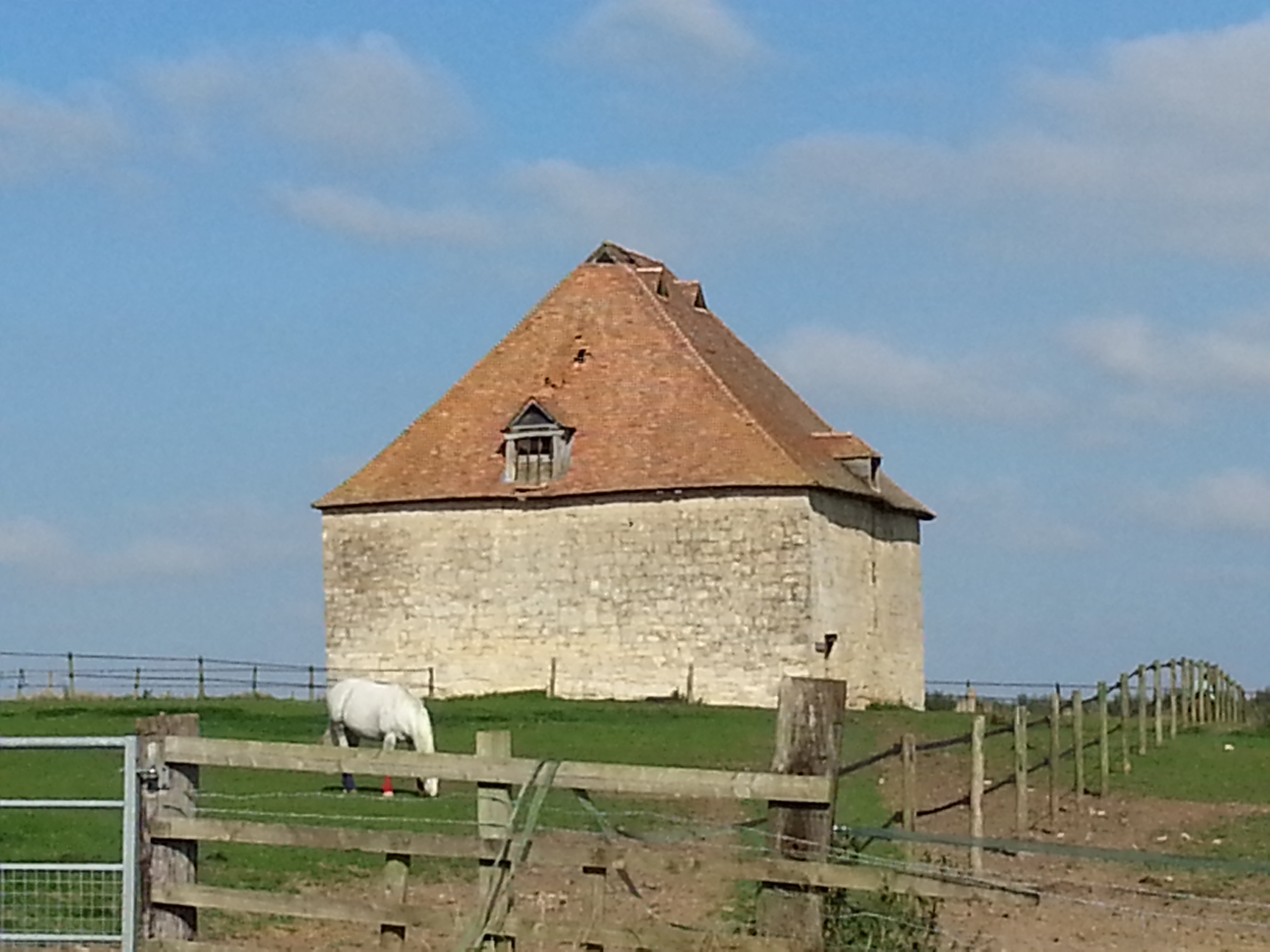
Notley Farm dovecote

The Notley Farm dovecote is a Grade I listed dovecote in Long Crendon in the county of Buckinghamshire, England. Though the dovecote has been attributed to the 14th century, it is believed to date from the 16th or 17th century, and to be built from stone from the former Notley Abbey.
