= Eve Gardiner =

British make-up artist

- Born: Evelyn Garce Rochford Gardiner; 14 November 1913; Clevedon, Somerset, England
- Died: 1 June 1992 (aged 78); London, England
- Occupation(s): Beautician; Make-up artist
- Years active: 1936–1992
- Employer: Max Factor
- Spouse: Michael David Gardiner (m. 1990)

Evelyn Grace Rochfort Gardiner (14 November 1913 – 1 June 1992) was an English beautician and remedial make-up artist who was a pioneer in the use of make-up on the blind and disfigured. She began working for Max Factor in 1936 when it opened a salon in London and was its first British make-up artist. Gardiner learnt how to disguise facial disfigurements and scarring with make-up from Max Factor Sr. and worked with patients sent to her by the plastic surgeon Harold Gillies for remedial camouflage make-up. She helped women who were blinded during the Second World War and became depressed because they could not see and thus not able to apply their make-up in their rehabilitation. Gardiner also developed a close association with the plastic surgeon Archibald McIndoe and members of his "Guinea Pig Club" to disguise Royal Air Force members who had suffered the most severe scarring, and taught a class of blind teenage girls skin care and make-up at Dorton House in Sevenoaks and at Linden Lodge School for the Blind in Wimbledon.

== Early life ==
On 14 November 1913, Gardiner was born on 14 November 1913 at Garfield in Clevedon, Somerset. She was the daughter of Edward Cecil Gardiner and his wife, Dorothy Frances Elizabeth (née Rochfort). Gardiner's great-grandfather discovered the salt mines in Carrickfergus and worked there for a long period of time. She planned to be an artist specialising in design and fashion, and had intended to study art at the Slade School of Fine Art before the loss of her father's income during the Great Depression in the 1930s meant he was unable to afford the necessary fees and she became a hairdresser, qualifying at one of the best private beauty and hair salons in London that was patronised by those from royalty, show business and high society.

== Career ==
In 1936, upon hearing that the Hollywood make-up artist Max Factor Sr. was about to open a salon on London's Old Bond Street, Gardiner successfully applied for a make-up job and received training. She was Max Factor's first make-up artist from the United Kingdom. The following year, she met Factor for the only time and passed on his knowledge of how to disguise facial disfigurements and scarring with make-up after his personal experience with soldiers heavily afflicted by poison gas burns during the First World War. Gardiner's clientele included patients sent to her by the plastic surgeon Harold Gillies for remedial camouflage make-up. She was leased to the BBC by Max Factor in 1938, working at the Radio Show in London since the corporation had no make-up artists. Gardiner did 12-hour stints applying make-up on artists for every television programme that was held at the exhibition, and continued to refine the technique from the era of monochrome television to the transition to colour systems.

The Second World War brought about the closure of Max Factor's London salon and Gardiner was conscripted to work in industry. She completed a 16-week crash course in mathematics, trigonometry and welding, becoming an aero-engine inspector who was trained to check 26,000 different engine components in a repair depot for seven days a week. The salon was reopened following the end of the war and Gardiner was appointed head and later director of beauty. Not long after, Gardiner was approached by St Dunstan's Institute for the Blind to aid women who were blinded during the war and subsequently developed depression because they were unable to see and thus not able to apply their make-up in their rehabilitation. She helped them by blinding herself by sitting in a darkened room that had no mirrors and developed sightless techniques of adornment, which would be assembled onto the audio cassette A Touch of Beauty that was released for blind women.

Gardiner also developed a close association with the plastic surgeon Archibald McIndoe and members of his "Guinea Pig Club" to disguise those Royal Air Force members who had suffered the most severe scarring. Ambulance-loads of war veterans arrived at the salon for treatment and she was required to experiment to locate methods to handle cosmetics with no risk of confusion and applying them as discreetly and precisely as before. Gardiner was approached by the Royal London Society for the Blind to educate a class of blind teenage girls at Dorton House in Sevenoaks and also taught at Linden Lodge School for the Blind in Wimbledon, educating in skin care and make-up by taking her students through a routine of using their fingers to "see" their faces.

Another part of her work at Max Factor was in the London theatre scene in which she arranged the make-up of a number of major stage productions that were held in the post-war years. This included the Festival of Britain productions of 1951 Caesar and Cleopatra and Antony and Cleopatra that starred Laurence Olivier and Vivien Leigh. She also worked in make-up for the Coronation of Elizabeth II. Following the decline in Max Factor's profits in the early 1970s, their London salon was closed in 1974. She went into semi-retirement in the same year, and continued to work for Max Factor as an adviser and lectured at women's clubs. In 1988, Gardiner was appointed to the Academy of Legends at the Esthetics World Expo 88 in Dallas, Texas, where she was the primary speaker.

== Personal life ==
Gardiner was an amateur artist.

In 1990, she married her cousin, the retired Canadian Army officer Lieutenant-Colonel Michael David Gardiner. She died at Ealing Hospital in London on 1 June 1992.
