= XT =

XT may refer to:

== Science and technology ==
=== Computing and electronics ===
- XT Mobile Network, a Telecom New Zealand mobile network
- IBM PC/XT, a personal computer
- XT bus architecture
- Crosstalk, an electrical interference caused by a wire carrying an electrical signal
- the XT versions of Radeon graphics cards
- XT (or XT[2]), a video server from EVS Broadcast Equipment
- XT XSLT, an implementation in Java of XSLT, created by James Clark
- X Toolkit Intrinsics or X toolkit, or Xt, a library providing an object-oriented-looking API for the X Window System
- Canon Digital Rebel XT, a digital single-lens reflex camera

=== Vehicles ===
- Ford XT Falcon, a car produced by the Ford Motor Company in Australia between 1968 and 1969
- Moyes XT, an Australian hang glider design
- Subaru XT, a sports car
- Yamaha XT 600 (and other XT versions), an enduro motorcycle

=== Aircraft ===
- XT, United States aircraft designator for Experimental Trainer

== Other uses ==
- XT Brewing Company, an English Microbrewery
- XT (band), a Swedish metal band
- Extra time, in sport
- Cross-training, in sport
- Air Exel (IATA airline code XT)
- Christmas tree (oil well)
- Bop It! XT, a 2011 electronic game
