= Chackmore =

Hamlet in Buckinghamshire, England

Coordinates: 52.016°N 1.001°W

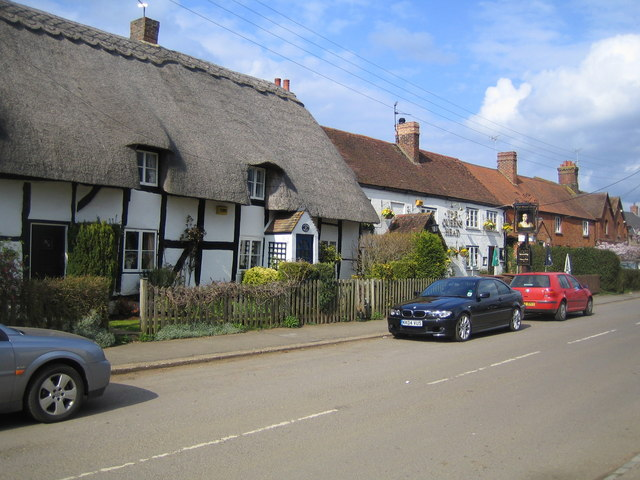

- Location within Buckinghamshire
- Population: 236
- Civil parish: Radclive-cum-Chackmore
- Unitary authority: Buckinghamshire
- Ceremonial county: Buckinghamshire
- Region: South East
- Country: England
- Sovereign state: United Kingdom
- Post town: Buckingham
- Postcode district: MK18
- Dialling code: 01280
- Police: Thames Valley
- Fire: Buckinghamshire
- Ambulance: South Central
- UK Parliament: Buckingham and Bletchley

Chackmore is a hamlet in the parish of Radclive-cum-Chackmore, in north Buckinghamshire, England. The hamlet is approached using the avenue that links Buckingham with Stowe Park.

== History ==
The name is Anglo Saxon in origin, and means 'Ceacca's moor'. It has been suggested though that the first part of the name could stem from the ancient word ceacce, meaning 'hill'. The hamlet was first recorded in manorial rolls in 1241 as Chakemore. It has also occasionally been recorded as Chalkmore.

Main Street in Chackmore was originally flanked by thatched cottages, only two of which retain thatched roofs following a fire that swept the entire length of the village some one hundred and fifty years ago. The main thoroughfare was dissected by a huge tree known as the Cross Tree, which served as a moot or meeting place for the villagers. This was removed some time during the last 20 years and replaced by a roundabout.

A lane running off the main street eventually becomes a cul-de-sac called The Maltings. This suggests there was once a brewery somewhere nearby though no records exist to that effect. Opposite the primary school a cobbler named Billy Ayers used to work from a small shed in his garden and his clientele included not only the local residents but also the pupils and staff of Stowe School. This provided an extremely busy and important cottage industry and was operational up until the mid-1970s.

There are several listed buildings located on Main Street, some dating from the 17th and 18th century.

== Education And Amenities ==
The village is home to St James and St John Church of England Primary School which was formed in September 2006 by merging Akeley Church of England School and Chackmore Church of England School, and by extending the merged school from a first school to a combined school.

Chackmore also has a playschool situated within the grounds of St. James and St. John Primary School. The playschool is run by a voluntary committee and takes children from 2 years old to 4 years old. The playschool was founded in 2002 with the help of Lottery funding. The village also has a pub called the Queens Head and a parish hall, which was re-done in 2010 with a sum of money from the will of Mr T.Clinton. The parish hall is also used for polling stations.

== Parish ==
Chackmore is located in the civil parish of Radclive-cum-Chackmore, in the unitary authority district of Buckinghamshire. Chackmore is the larger of the two villages and is estimated to have a population of around 180 out of a combined parish total of 236. The parish church is located in Radclive, and is part of the Buckingham Benefice. The A422 bisects the parish, with Chackmore to the north and Radclive to the south.
