= Dorton House, Buckinghamshire =

16th century English Grade I listed house

Dorton House (now Ashfold School)
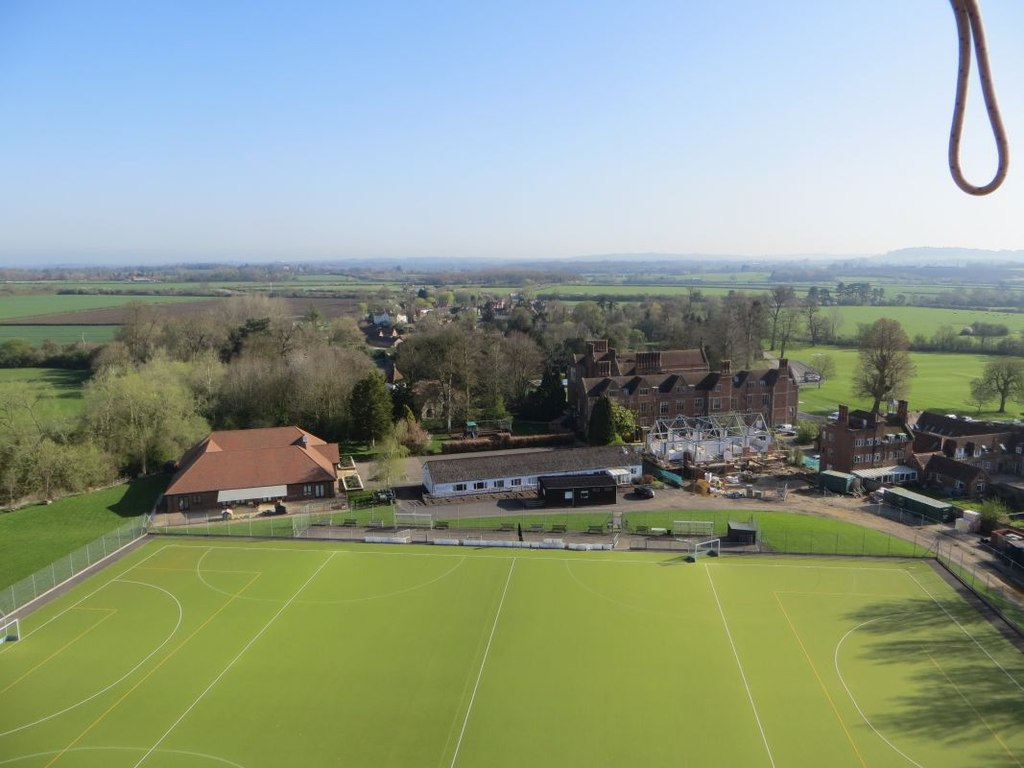
- Aerial view of Dorton House (now Ashfold School)

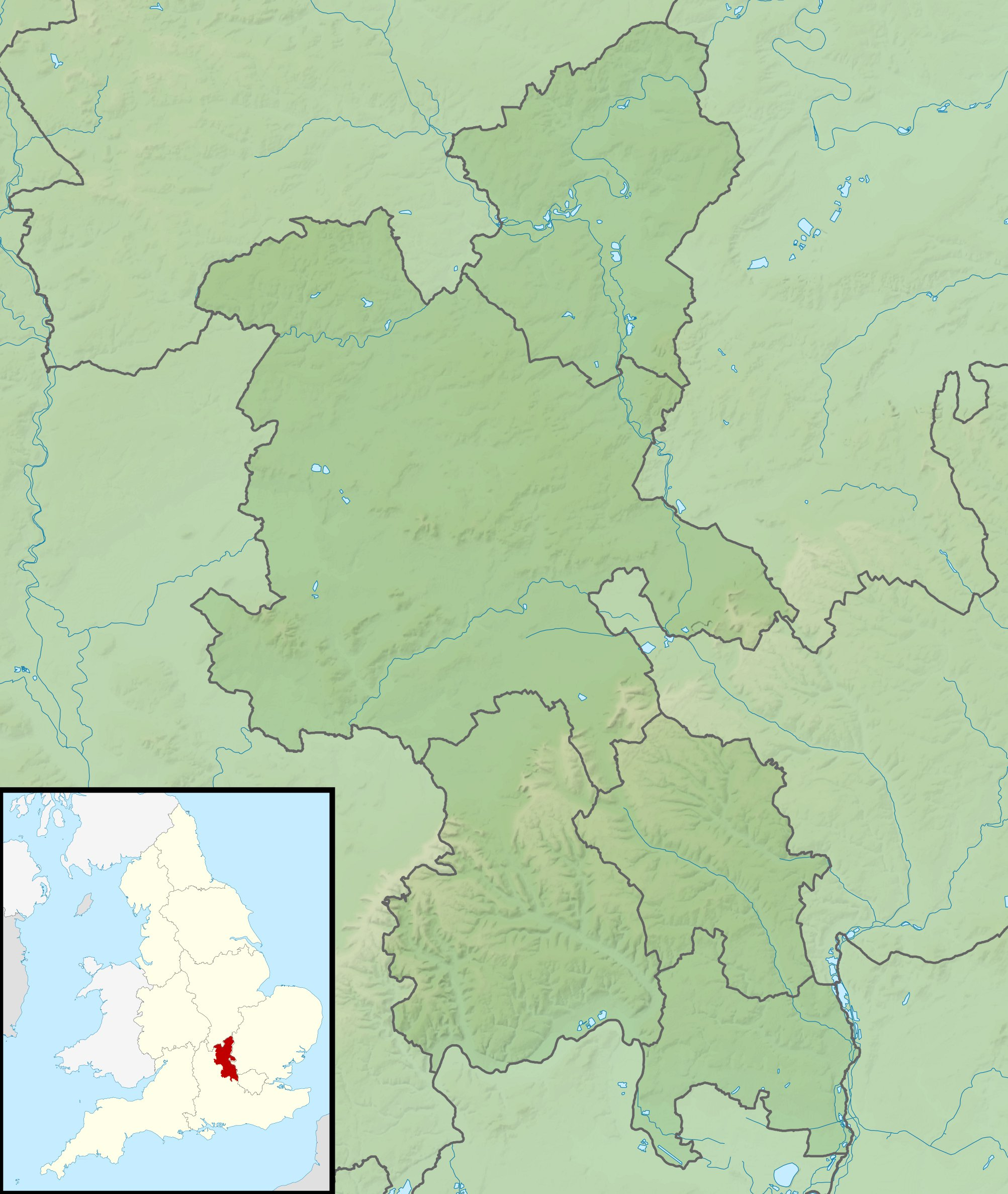
- Location within Buckinghamshire
- 51.8196°N 1.016°W
- Type: House (now school)
- Location: Dorton, Buckinghamshire

History
- Built: 17th century with later alterations

Site notes
- Architectural style: Jacobean
- Owner: Ashfold School Trust

Listed Building – Grade I
- Official name: Ashfold School
- Designated: 25 October 1951
- Reference no.: 1124266

Listed Building – Grade II
- Official name: Stable block at Ashfold School
- Designated: 26 February 1985
- Reference no.: 1311471

Listed Building – Grade II
- Official name: Walls surrounding kitchen garden, with summerhouse at Ashfold School
- Designated: 26 February 1985
- Reference no.: 1332807

Listed Building – Grade II
- Official name: Gardener's cottage at Ashfold School
- Designated: 26 February 1985
- Reference no.: 1124267

Listed Building – Grade II
- Official name: Dorton Spa Farmhouse
- Designated: 26 February 1985
- Reference no.: 1158469

Dorton House is a Jacobean country house near the village of Dorton in Buckinghamshire, England. It was built between 1596 and 1626. It currently houses Ashfold School, an independent preparatory school. Dorton House is a Grade I listed building.

== History ==
Historic England gives a build date for the house of the early 17th century, noting a datestone for 1626 on an external soffit. Elizabeth Williamson and Nikolaus Pevsner, in their revised Buckinghamshire volume of the Buildings of England, give a rather later date of 1675. Both attribute the house to Sir John Dormer.

The house was sold in 1783 to Sir John Fletcher and remained in his family until 1928 when it was sold to Major Michael Beaumont who served as a British soldier, Conservative Member of Parliament for Aylesbury, Justice of the Peace and Deputy Lieutenant of Buckinghamshire.

The Royal London Society for the Blind purchased the house in 1939, as a school, before they moved to Wildernesse at Dorton House in Seal, Kent, in 1955.

In 1955 the house was purchased by James Harrison and turned into Ashfold preparatory school.

Ashfold School is a co-educational independent day and boarding preparatory school for about 270 pupils aged from 3 to 13 years. Actor brothers Edward and James Fox attended the school when it was near Haywards Heath in West Sussex.

== Architecture and description ==
The house is in a Jacobean Style and is in a horseshoe shape. The house was built from bricks made from local clay fired at the bottom of Brill Hill.

== Sources ==
- Craig, F. W. S. (1983) [1969]. British parliamentary election results 1918–1949 (3rd ed.). Chichester: Parliamentary Research Services. p. 295. ISBN 0-900178-06-X.
- Pevsner, Nicholas; Williamson, Elizabeth (2003). Buckinghamshire. The Buildings of England. New Haven, US and London: Yale University Press. ISBN 9780300095845. OCLC 1204460755.
