= XT Brewing Company =

Microbrewery in Buckinghamshire, England

- Interactive map of XT Brewing Company
- Type: Microbrewery
- Location: Long Crendon, Buckinghamshire, England
- Coordinates: 51.777°N 0.9691°W
- Opened: 2011
- Annual production volume: 80 barrels per week
- Employees: 12
- Website: xtbrewing.com

The XT Brewing Company is a microbrewery based in Long Crendon, Buckinghamshire, England.

== History ==
The brewery was founded in 2011 by Russell Taylor and Gareth Xifaras, the company is based on the Notley Farm Estate. The brewery has a brew length of 20 brewers barrels and produces mainly for cask beer. More recently, beers have been brewed for kegs, bottles, and cans. The beers are branded as XT or under the Animal Brewing Co. labels. The brewery underwent a building and equipment expansion project during 2015 to increase capacity. In 2017, capacity was increased for the introduction of the Eisbar Lager.

The XT brewery produces a core range of beers which are mainly numbered from XT1 through to XT9, which follow a pattern of increasing darkness. A range of seasonal beers are also produced. The Animal-branded beers are named after animals, animal sounds, or animal slang terms. Speciality beers have been produced to mark local celebrations, or Magna Carta, or as collaborations with other breweries or food specialists such as Will Torrent and the Roast Cacao Beer. XT has also been involved as a partner brewer in the development of new English hop varieties, working alongside the British Hop Association and Charles Faram's hop breeding programme. The programme aims to bring new hop varieties to the market and offers a wider range of flavour profiles as an alternative to imported varieties. One of the experimental beers, named Brit Hop, was released at the 2017 Great British Beer Festival. Such beers are available across the south, west, and midlands of England.

== Community ==
XT is a founding member of the Alliance of Oxford Brewers and the Oxford Beer Week.

Beers are occasionally made for national charitable causes such as The Lest We Forget project, which was initiated by XT to produce a nationwide collaboration beer to support the appeal, and for local charities such as the Florence Nightingale Hospice appeal.

The brewery sponsors Wheatley Rugby Club, Long Crendon Football Club, and Thame Town Cricket Club.

== See also ==
- Brewery
- List of microbreweries
