= Marlow Place =

Grade I listed building in Wycombe, United Kingdom

Coordinates: 51.5700°N 0.7736°W

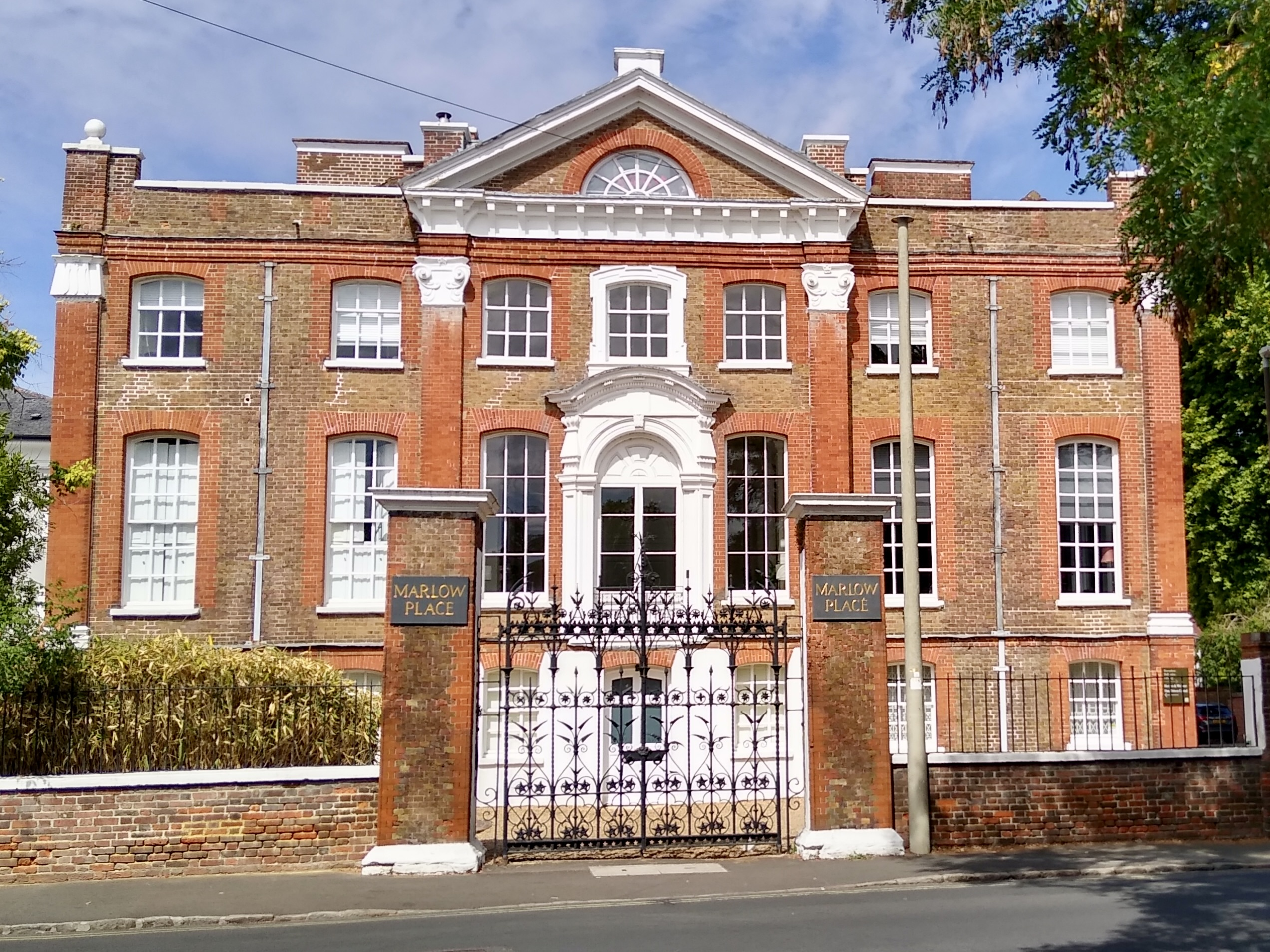
Marlow Place in 2026

Marlow Place is a country house in Marlow, Buckinghamshire. It is a Grade I listed building.

== History ==
The house, which was designed by Thomas Archer in the English Baroque style, was built for John Wallop, 1st Viscount Lymington and completed in 1721. It was briefly used as a residence of the Prince of Wales in the 1720s. After coming into the ownership of William Clayton of Harleyford Manor it was sold to Thomas Williams of Temple around 1790. It served as an overflow for the junior department of the Royal Military College, shortly after the college was established in 1802, and also served as a boarding school in the 1860s but remained in the ownership of the Williams family until well into the 20th century. It was a finishing school for girls in the 1950s and is now used as offices. In the 1990s it was the office of Holmes & Marchant lnternational, an international branding consultancy.
