= Thornton, Buckinghamshire =

Village in Buckinghamshire, England

Coordinates: 51.997°N 0.918°W

Thornton
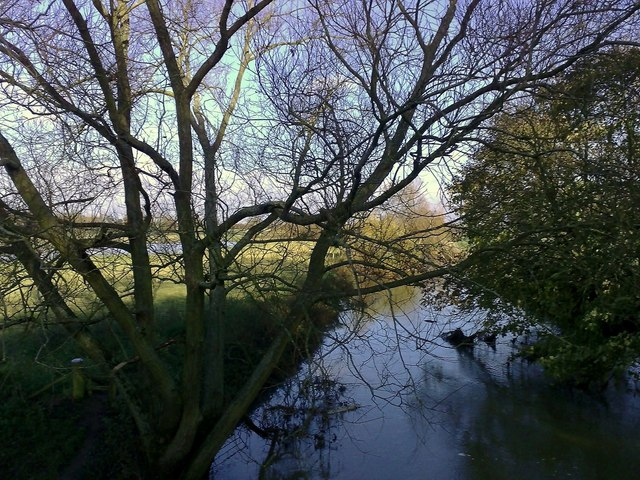
- River Ouse, Thornton, 2008

- Location within Buckinghamshire
- Population: 194 (2011 Census including Foscott)
- OS grid reference: SP7536
- Civil parish: Thornton
- Unitary authority: Buckinghamshire
- Ceremonial county: Buckinghamshire
- Region: South East
- Country: England
- Sovereign state: United Kingdom
- Post town: Milton Keynes
- Postcode district: MK17
- Dialling code: 01280
- Police: Thames Valley
- Fire: Buckinghamshire
- Ambulance: South Central
- UK Parliament: Buckingham and Bletchley

Thornton is a village and civil parish on the River Great Ouse about 3.5 miles (5.6 km) north-east of Buckingham in the unitary authority area of Buckinghamshire.

== History ==
The toponym is derived from the Old English for "thorn tree by a farm". The Domesday Book of 1086 records the village as Ternitone.

It was formerly thought that the "lost" Domesday manor of Hasley formed part of Thornton but it is now established that it was part of Radclive.

== Church ==
The earliest record of the Church of England Church of Saint Michael and All Angels dates from 1219. The present building is 14th-century, but was dramatically restored between 1770 and 1800 and largely rebuilt by the Gothic Revival architect John Tarring in 1850. The restorers retained mediaeval features including the 14th-century belltower, chancel arch and clerestory and 15th century clerestory windows.

== Thornton Hall ==
The Tudor Revival Thornton Hall (now Thornton College) was also built to John Tarring's designs in 1850. It incorporates parts of a medieval house modernised in the 18th century. The manor was home to Richard Cavendish.

== Thornton College ==
Thornton College, an independent day and boarding school for girls, occupies the former Manor House Thornton Hall. The school educates girls aged 4 – 18 and has a nursery for boys and girls aged 2½ to 4. The Sisters of Jesus and Mary (a Catholic religious order) purchased the site in 1917. Recent developments include the opening of a Science and Prep Classroom wing (AVDC Outstanding Design Award) in 2010, and a new Sixth Form department in 2016. The school now has over 400 pupils.

== Sources ==
- Page, William, ed. (1927). Victoria County History: A History of the County of Buckingham, Volume 4. pp. 243–249., available online
- Pevsner, Nikolaus (1973) [1960]. The Buildings of England: Buckinghamshire. Harmondsworth: Penguin Books. p. 268. ISBN 0-14-071019-1.
