= Radclive =

Village in Buckinghamshire, England

Coordinates: 52.001°N 1.016°W

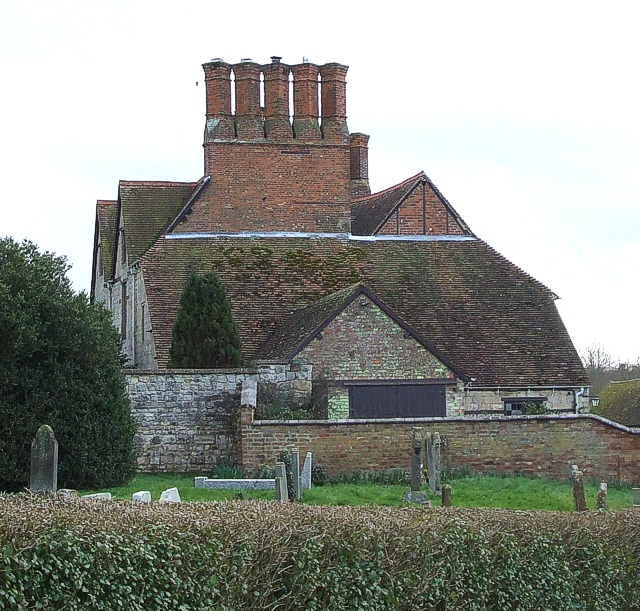
- Radclive Manor - side view

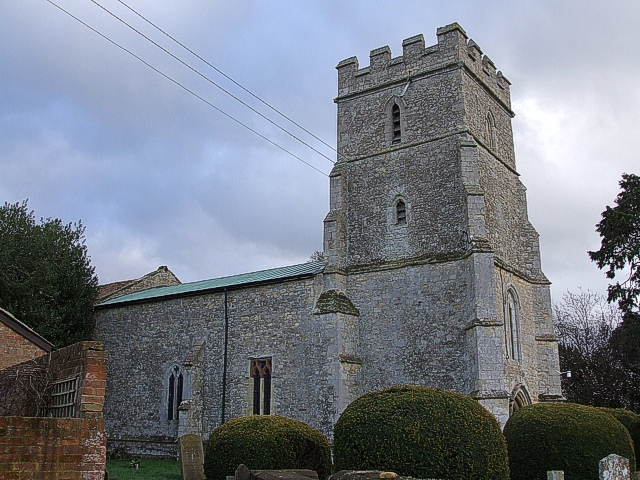
- St. John the Evangelist, Radclive

- Location within Buckinghamshire
- Population: 231 (2011 Census)
- OS grid reference: SP6734
- Civil parish: Radclive-cum-Chackmore
- Unitary authority: Buckinghamshire
- Ceremonial county: Buckinghamshire
- Region: South East
- Country: England
- Sovereign state: United Kingdom
- Post town: Buckingham
- Postcode district: MK18
- Dialling code: 01280
- Police: Thames Valley
- Fire: Buckinghamshire
- Ambulance: South Central
- UK Parliament: Buckingham and Bletchley

Radclive is a village on the River Great Ouse just over 1 mile (1.6 km) west of Buckingham in Buckinghamshire, England. It is in the civil parish of Radclive-cum-Chackmore in the unitary authority district of Buckinghamshire. The parish includes the hamlet of Chackmore about 1.5 miles (2.4 km) north of Buckingham.

Radclive's toponym is derived from the Old English for "red cliff", referring to the colour of the local soil and a cliff overlooking the river. The Domesday Book of 1086 records the village as Radeclive.

Parts of the Church of England parish church of Saint John the Evangelist date from 1200 but the tower is believed to be 100 years later. There are some rare early English pews decorated with poppy heads, and a Jacobean communion rail with openwork balustrading. The nave window contains some examples of 14th century stained glass that survived the English Reformation and the English Civil War.

The Manor House was built in about 1620 and is the remaining part of a much larger mansion. The house contains an original oak staircase which has an open balustrade with finial topped ovals and lozenges, very similar in design to the staircase at Princes Risborough Manor House.

That portion of Radclive south of the River Ouse once formed the "lost" Domesday manor of Hasley, formerly thought erroneously to have formed part of Thornton.
