= St Peter and St Paul, Buckingham =

- Buckingham Parish Church of Saint Peter and Saint Paul
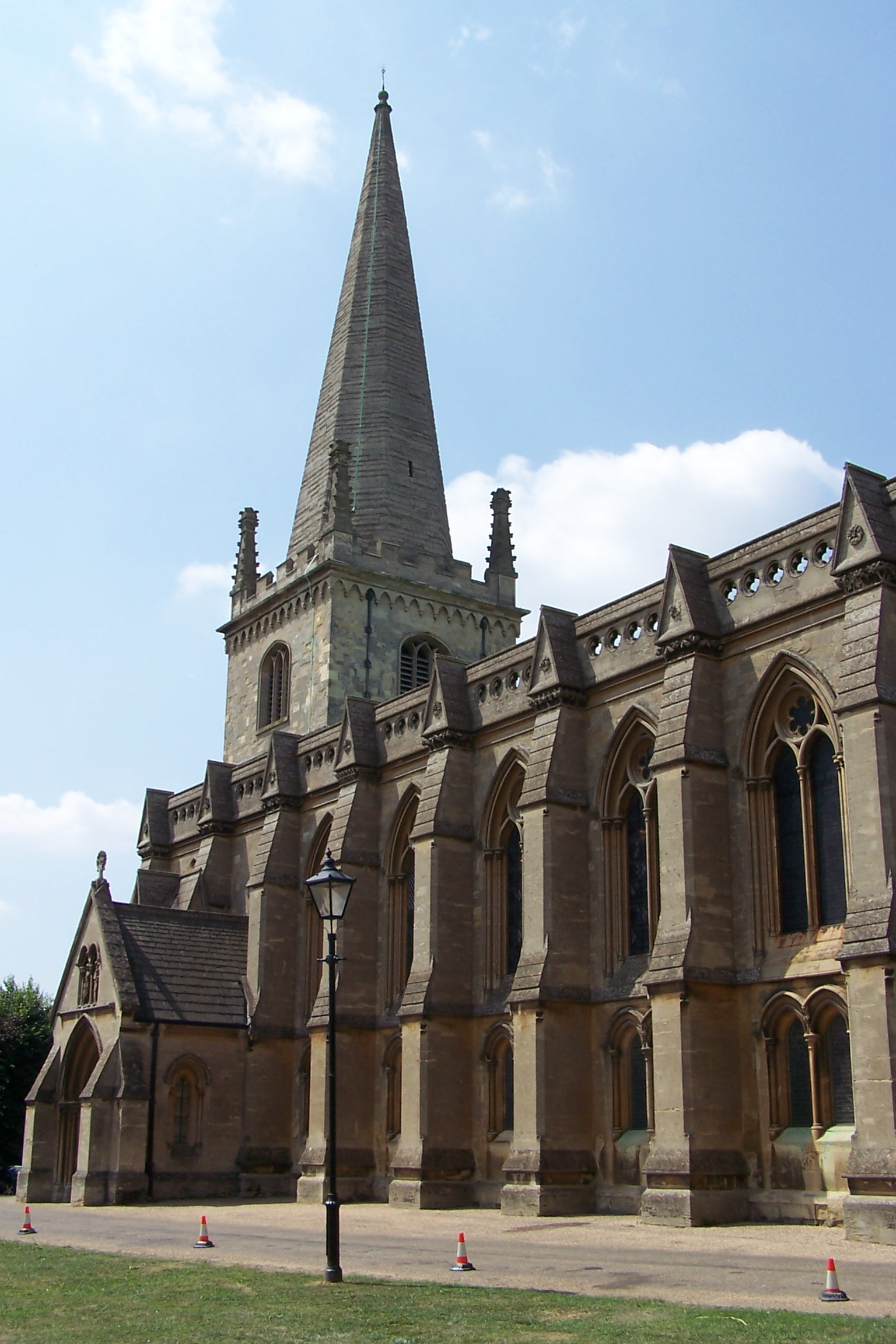
- St Peter and St Paul, Buckingham
- 51.9981°N 0.9896°W
- Location: Buckingham, Buckinghamshire
- Country: England
- Denomination: Church of England
- Churchmanship: Evangelical
- Website: buckinghamparishchurch.org.uk

History
- Status: Parish church
- Dedication: Saint Peter; Saint Paul
- Consecrated: 6 December 1780

Architecture
- Functional status: Active
- Heritage designation: Grade I listed building
- Architect(s): Sir George Gilbert Scott (extensions and alterations)
- Style: Gothic Revival
- Groundbreaking: 1777
- Completed: 1780 (additions 1867)

Specifications
- Materials: Stone

Administration
- Province: Province of Canterbury
- Diocese: Diocese of Oxford

Clergy
- Rector: The Revd Will Pearson-Gee

St. Peter and St. Paul, known commonly as Buckingham Parish Church, is the Anglican parish church in Buckingham, Buckinghamshire, England. The current rector is Revd Will Pearson-Gee who leads a range of services; traditional and modern in style, most of which are on Sunday. The church is prominently located in the centre of the historic core of Buckingham on Castle Hill.

== Services ==
The church holds four services per week, three on a Sunday and one on a Wednesday.

Sunday 9AM: Traditional Service - Traditional hymns and readings, led every week by one of the church's three current organists and church choir (Except on first Sundays of the month)

Sunday 11AM: Family Service - Family based worship with Contemporary Christian music, led every week by a contemporary band

Sunday 6PM: Contemporary Service - Contemporary Christian music, led every week by a contemporary band

Wednesday 10AM: Midweek Holy Communion - Said service with Holy Communion

== History ==
The previous church located in Prebend End dated from before 1445 but no records have been found before this date apart from a reference to it in the Domesday Book of 1086. It had a history of the tower and spire collapsing several times and in 1776 it collapsed for the final time. Browne Willis had a great desire to restore the church to its former glory following the last repairs in 1698, but the new spire was too ambitious.

A new site became available on Castle Hill and the decision was taken to move the church. The foundation stone for the new church was laid by Robert Bartlett, bailiff of Buckingham, on 25 November 1777 at a grand ceremony, including the singing of a hymn specially composed for the occasion followed by the roasting of an ox with beer and bread supplied by Earl Temple. On 6 December 1780, the church was consecrated by Thomas Thurlow, Bishop of Lincoln following a detailed petition letter sent to the Bishop which described the reasons for the new church. The petition read as follows:

"That the Tower of the ancient fabric of the Parish Church of Buckingham having fallen down destroyed the Great parts of the Church, and that the inhabitants were unable to rebuild the same, that in consideration of such inability, the Right Hon Richard Earl Temple generously under took by Virtue of an act of Parliament to build a new Church... that the said Church is now completely finished for the celebration of divine worship, by the Right Hon George Earl Temple, Heir to the said Richard Earl Temple. That the ground on which the said Church is erected, together with commodious passages thereto and an area surrounding the same has been freely given and legally conveyed for the use of the said Parish by the Right Hon Ralph Earl Verney of the Kingdom of Ireland."

== Architecture ==
The Church design originally had just two elements: the tower with octagonal plan spire, and the nave with a sanctuary formed within this main volume and was quite a simple Georgian building. The current Victorian Gothic Revival church seen today is the result of many 19th-century alterations by George Gilbert Scott including the significant structural repairs and new buttresses and internal alterations started in 1860, a chancel added in 1865 and a porch in 1867. The new chancel was funded by a £358 donation from the Duke of Buckingham and Chandos.

The additions were consecrated by Bishop Wilberforce in 1867, leaving little of the original 18th-century church left untouched.

== The Restoration of the organ ==
The Buckingham Parish Church organ, built by Norman & Beard was originally installed at St John's Church, Aylesbury, with the opening recital given on 30 January 1913, by Dr. Ley. It was moved to Buckingham in 1969 and overhauled with some tonal alteration. In 2015–16, following well over 100 years of service, the organ was restored, raised and rebuilt by Peter Collins Ltd, including new stops in keeping with ‘Hill, Norman & Beard schemes. When the organ was moved from Aylesbury to Buckingham, it was considered fashionable to remove the large Open Diapason on the Great Organ and replace with a lighter sounding diapason and to add a mixture stop. The large Open Diapason has been reinstated and the mixture re-voiced. Additional stops added to the Swell and Pedal organ improve the chorus effect without changing the overall tonal character of the instrument.

Raising of the organ onto a mezzanine platform enables the projection of sound into the building more efficiently than previously. The new platform also allows the front case of the organ to be brought forward of the arches which previously hid part of the case on the South side and this has improved sound projection. The pitch of the organ has been raised to concert pitch (A440 Hz) which also allows more versatility during worship, particularly for choral accompaniment and for use by external choirs and music societies.

A new mobile console includes the stops for a Choir organ to be added in the future, subject to raising funds for the additional wind chest and clarinet; the floating Tromba is already in place for this division and the other pipes in store, saved from the Norman & Beard at St. Andrew's, Kettering.

With practical preservation and longevity in mind, the organ is a recent example of Norman & Beard's work, especially helpful for the worship needs of the church, and for musical opportunities in the community. The restoration was made possible by many individual donors as well as trusts and organisations. Since restoration, the organ has been included in the Buckingham Summer Festival, Buckingham Choral Society concerts, and organ recitals. There is further potential for recordings and educational initiatives in the future.

The organ is in regular use, being used every week for the Sunday Traditional Service.
