= St Michael and All Angels' Church, Thornton =

Coordinates: 52.0194°N 0.9054°W

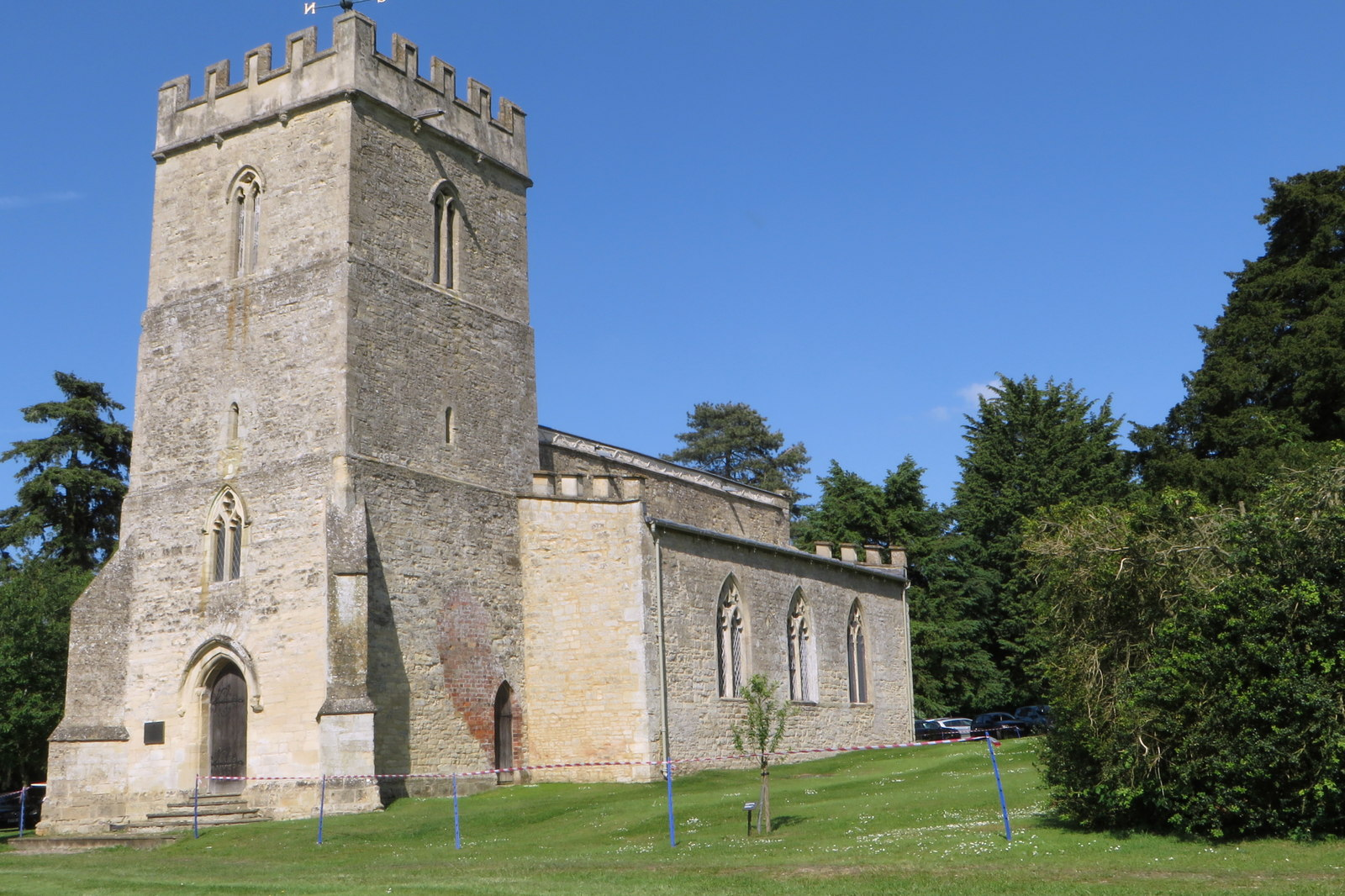

- Location in Buckinghamshire
- OS grid reference: SP 752 363
- Location: Thornton, Buckinghamshire
- Country: England
- Denomination: Anglican
- Website: Churches Conservation Trust

History
- Status: Former parish church
- Dedication: Saint Michael

Architecture
- Functional status: Redundant
- Heritage designation: Grade I
- Designated: 13 June 1966
- Architectural type: Church
- Style: Gothic, Gothic Revival

Specifications
- Materials: Stone rubble

St Michael and All Angels' Church is a redundant Anglican church in the village of Thornton, Buckinghamshire, England. It is recorded in the National Heritage List for England as a designated Grade I listed building, and is under the care of the Churches Conservation Trust. The church stands to the north of the village, in the grounds of Thornton Hall (now a girls' boarding school), to the east of the River Ouse, some 4 miles (6 km) northeast of Buckingham.

== History ==
The first church on the site was built in 1219, but the present building dates from the first half of the 14th century. This originally consisted of a nave with a clerestory, north and south aisles, a chancel with a chapel to its north, and a west tower. Under the north chapel was the burial vault of the Tyrell baronets of Thornton. The north aisle was demolished in 1620, and the north arcade was walled up. Between 1780 and 1800 the church was re-ordered, turning it into a "rectangular preaching box". The north aisle was rebuilt and the arcade re-opened, the chancel arch was walled up and the chancel and north chapel were demolished. A new ceiling was made below the level of the clerestory windows, which were blocked up. A gallery was erected at the west end, and the church was re-floored and re-seated. In 1850 a communion rail was erected at the east end, making the eastern bay into a sanctuary. During the 20th century the church ceased to be a parish church and by the 1990s it was in a neglected condition. The church was vested in the Churches Conservation Trust on 1 April 1993. Volunteers from the Wolverton and District Archaeological Society cleaned the church and its monuments.

== Architecture ==
=== Exterior ===
St Michael's is constructed in coursed stone rubble with lead roofs. Its plan consists of a four-bay nave, north and south aisles, and a west tower. The tower is in three stages with diagonal buttresses. In the bottom stage is an arched west doorway, above which is a two-light Decorated window. In the middle stage there are lancet windows, and the top stage contains two-light bell openings. On the summit of the tower is a battlemented parapet with gargoyles, and a wrought iron weathervane shaped like a key. The nave parapet is plain, and the clerestory windows are blocked. The north and south walls of the aisles contain three two-light Decorated windows, and at the summits are battlemented parapets. The east window dates from the 19th century; it has three lights and is also in Decorated style.

=== Interior ===
Inside the church are north and south four-bay arcades carried on octagonal piers. The ceiling is flat and plastered. The aisles contain box pews, made in deal but painted to resemble oak. One of these, at the east end of the south aisle, is larger than the others and was occupied by the lord of the manor and his family. At the east of the north aisle is a simple pulpit. At the west end is a gallery that is approached by a narrow stairway. On the front of the gallery is a wooden carving of the royal arms made from three types of wood.

There is no seating in the nave, but instead a series of memorials. On each side of the western entry to the nave, under the gallery, is an alabaster effigy; on the left of John Barton, who died in 1437, and on the north side is Isabella, his wife who died in 1457. In the body of the nave is the font, then the alabaster effigy of a 14th-century priest. Beyond these is the re-assembled tomb chest of Robert Ingylton. This had been moved from the church at the beginning of the 19th century and used to form a grotto in the grounds of the house. Its remains were discovered in 1945 and reassembled in the church the following year. The top of the tomb is covered by a large brass inscribed with the figures of a man in armour, three wives, and 14 children, all framed by a canopy with four gables. The sides of the freestone chest are carved with niches containing figures of saints.

Around the church are smaller brasses and wall memorials. There is stained glass in the east window and in the south windows. The east window was made possibly by William Wailes in about 1850, and one of the windows in the south was made by Cox and Son and dedicated in 1878. There is no organ in the church, but there are two harmoniums, one in the middle of the nave, and one incorporated in the preacher's desk. There is a ring of three bells, but these are unringable. The oldest was cast in about 1315, the next in about 1430 by Richard Hille, and the last in 1635 by Richard Chandler I.

== See also ==
- List of churches preserved by the Churches Conservation Trust in South East England
