= Savay Farm =

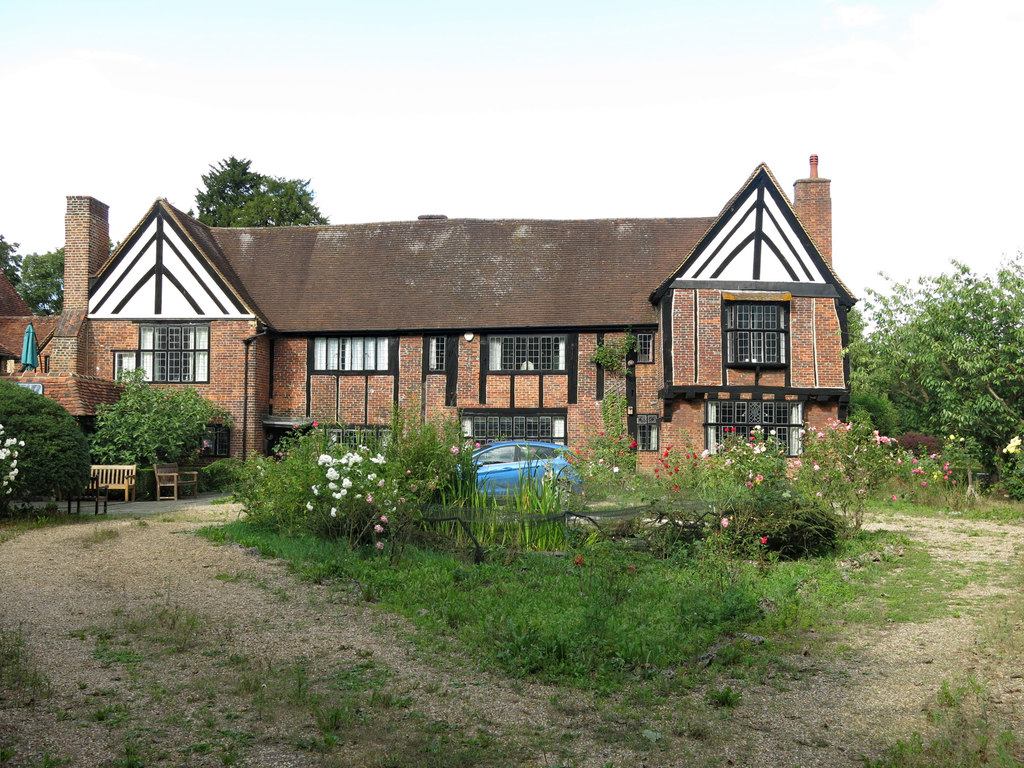
- The farmhouse in 2019
- Interactive map of the Savay Farm area
- Former names: Manor of Denham Durdent, The Savoy and Savehay Farm

General information
- Type: Hall house
- Location: Savay Farm, Savay Lane, Denham, England
- Coordinates: 51.581571°N 0.490563°W
- Completed: 14th century

Design and construction
- Designations: Grade I listed

Savay Farm is a Grade I listed twelfth century farmhouse in Denham, Buckinghamshire, England.

The house has a timber frame and red brick nogging.

It was granted Grade I status in September 1955, protecting it from unauthorised alteration or demolition.

Past owners of the house have included the Durdent Family (1130-1512) after whom the house was once named and Lt-Gen. Gerald Goodlake VC, a veteran of the Crimean War and recipient of the Victoria Cross. Goodlake's medals are currently held in the Regimental Headquarters of the Grenadier Guards in the Wellington Barracks, Westminster.

Savay Farm was later lived in by Sir Oswald Mosley, a British politician and the founder of the British Union of Fascists. He lived at Savehay Farm (name used by the Mosleys) with his wife, Lady Cynthia Mosley (nee Curzon). On the 23rd May 1940, officers of Special Branch raided Savay Farm in conjunction with Mosley's internment and found a collection of firearms and ammunition.

As of December 2016, the house is in private ownership. It is within 300 metres (330 yd) of the proposed path of the High Speed 2 railway, which would pass the house on the 30 metres (33 yd) high Colne Valley Viaduct.
