= Dorton Spa =

Chalybeate spring

Coordinates: 51°49′2.17″N 1°1′46.42″W

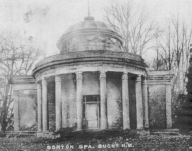
Dorton Spa, 1906

Dorton Spa is a chalybeate spring located between the villages of Dorton and Brill in Buckinghamshire, England, in a grove of trees called "Spa Wood". Chalybeate is defined as "a water or other liquor containing iron", the word's origin is Greek chalyps; chalybos, meaning steel; Chalyps being an ancient nation in Pontus famous for its steel. A nineteenth century chemical dictionary describes the Dorton Spa as the most celebrated chalybeate and from the account "there is nothing in England to compete with it, which is nearly four times as strongly impregnated with iron as Tunbridge waters and almost as powerful as the famed waters of Toplitz, Germany".

The discolouration of the turf of Dorton by the iron oxide in its water was generally known by local people for hundreds of years. Little was heard of its medicinal effects apart from some skin disorders that could be cured and the custom of washing mangy dogs and diseased cattle in the water. With some improvements in the area's roads in the late 17th century and increased communication, more people heard of the Dorton waters. The number of people visiting became so great that damage to crops and fences made it necessary to restrain the peasantry to one path and to regulate the supply of water. The well was enclosed and 50–100 gallons were disposed of daily at a fixed price.

The proprietor of the Dorton estate, Mr Ricketts of Dorton House, wished to allow public access to the water, so he erected a pump room and baths of an extensive and ornamental manner. This handsome structure, modelled on Greek architecture, was entered by a flight of stone steps and through a semicircular portico supported by nine circular columns with Corinthian capitals. A dome rose above the centre, and the ceiling of the spacious and lofty pump-room was supported by eight columns painted to resemble Sienna marble. Twelve acres (4.9 hectares) of park were laid out, and planted with evergreen and deciduous shrubs, and also a serpentine lake covering an acre. A large opening ceremony took place in 1830. For a short period it gained some celebrity; Dorton Spa had become a fashionable resort. A Grand Fête was held in 1837; other efforts were made to bring the establishment before the public.

The fame of Dorton spread and stories of the effects of the waters grew. A man from Oxford with leprosy for more than 20 years was cured by the water. A woman of Buckingham, with scrofula was cured within six weeks. An elderly resident from Tetsworth who had been unable to walk, received great benefit in a case of a bleeding cancer; after treatment with the water he walked a considerable distance. Cures were also cited for hysteria, indigestion, bilious affections, worms, haemorrhages, rheumatism, fevers, ague, St Vitus's dance, dropsy, herpes, ulcers, abscesses, general nervous diseases, a host of skin disorders, and even total blindness. A depot or agency office was opened in London for the sale of the water. The Ashmolean Museum in Oxford has a label from a bottle of Dorton water. A surgeon who lived in nearby Oakley wrote a book which discussed and praised the Spa.

Grandiose schemes were proposed showing ten separate baths, two ballrooms, a reading room and a billiard room. Whether all these schemes were completed is subject to conjecture. A hotel in Brill was also built, the Spa Hotel, overlooking the spa to accommodate the visitors. (The hotel was pulled down after damage sustained by a German doodle-bug exploding nearby in World War II).

But in 1841 the new Queen Victoria did not come to Dorton. Because of Royal patronage, Tunbridge Wells became "Royal Tunbridge Wells", and Leamington Spa became "Royal Leamington Spa". Dorton missed out: its isolated situation made it impossible to obtain popularity; the sanguine expectations of the promoters were not realised.

All that remains is a small circular brick well building with a curved wooden door which is hidden within privately owned "iron fenced" Spa Wood. Parts of the original columns can also be found within the wood.
