= Nether Winchendon =

Village in Buckinghamshire, England

Coordinates: 51.8038°N 0.9385°W

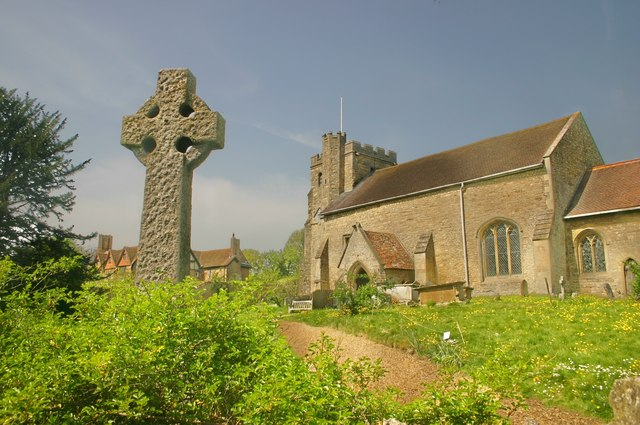
- St Nicholas' parish church

- Location within Buckinghamshire
- Population: 165 (2011 Census)
- OS grid reference: SP731122
- Civil parish: Nether Winchendon
- Unitary authority: Buckinghamshire
- Ceremonial county: Buckinghamshire
- Region: South East
- Country: England
- Sovereign state: United Kingdom
- Post town: Aylesbury
- Postcode district: HP18
- Dialling code: 01844
- Police: Thames Valley
- Fire: Buckinghamshire
- Ambulance: South Central
- UK Parliament: Mid Buckinghamshire
- Website: Nether Winchendon Parish Meeting

Nether Winchendon or Lower Winchendon is a village and civil parish in Buckinghamshire, England. It is near the county boundary with Oxfordshire, about 5.5 miles (9 km) west of Aylesbury and 2.5 miles (4 km) north of Haddenham. In 2011 the parish had a population of 165. From 1974 to 2020 it was in Aylesbury Vale district.

The toponym "Winchendon" is derived from the Old English for "hill at a bend". The Domesday Book of 1086 records Winchendon as Wincandone.

== Nether Winchendon House ==
Nether Winchendon House, a manor house in Nether Winchendon, built on the site of an Augustinian priory that was a daughter house of Notley Abbey in Long Crendon. Jasper Tudor, Duke of Bedford bought and largely remodelled the priory. The house and gardens are now open to the public and the house is noted for its interior. Nether Winchendon House also hosts weddings.

== Nether Winchendon in films and television ==
Nether Winchendon has been a frequent setting for television and film production, including two Midsomer Murders episodes (as different houses); Lady Pat's house in Forever Green and the BBC series Chef! starring Lenny Henry. St Nicholas' parish church was the setting for a baptism scene in the film Bridget Jones: The Edge of Reason, but can be seen only in the deleted scenes section of the DVD.

== Notable residents ==
- Sir Francis Bernard, 1st Baronet – as governor of the provinces of New Jersey and Massachusetts Bay, his uncompromising policies were instrumental in the events leading to the American Revolution.
