= St Mary's Church, Haddenham =

St Mary's Church
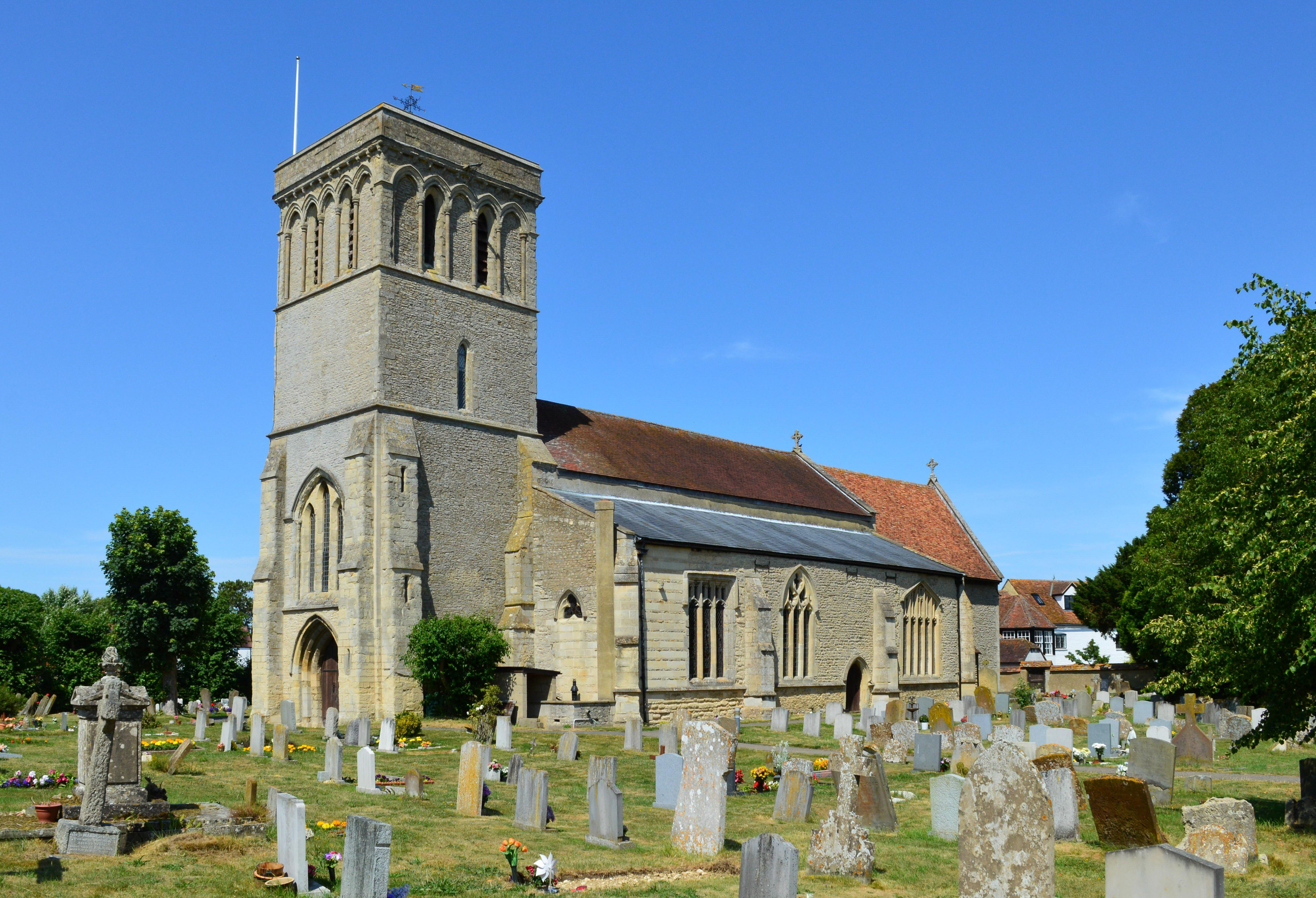
- St Mary's Church, Haddenham
- St Mary's Church
- 51°45′57″N 0°55′36″W
- OS grid reference: SP 74165 08002
- Country: England
- Denomination: Church of England
- Previous denomination: Roman Catholic
- Website: St Mary's, Haddenham

Architecture
- Heritage designation: Grade I
- Designated: 21 December 1967

Administration
- Province: Canterbury
- Diocese: Oxford
- Archdeaconry: Buckingham
- Deanery: Aylesbury
- Benefice: Wychert Vale Benefice
- Parish: Haddenham with Cuddington, Kingsey and Aston Sandford

Clergy
- Vicar: Revd. Cassa Messervy

St Mary's Church is the Church of England parish church of Haddenham, Buckinghamshire. It is a Grade I listed building.

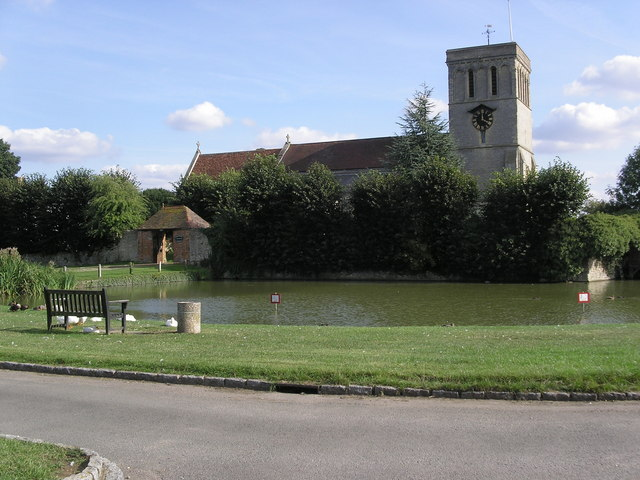
Church and Duck pond

== History ==
Parts of the church are 12th century Norman, from when the Benedictine abbey of Rochester, Kent held the parish. The first priest was called just Gilbert.

Other parts of the building may be from the original Saxon church, including the font, which has a drawing of a dragon imprinted on it. The tower is Early English Gothic dating from the late 13th century, with the aisles having been rebuilt in the 14th century.

In 2008 the church had major refurbishments, as part of the Millennium 2 project. A new vestry, creche, and kitchen were built and the roof was repaired, along with other additions and fixings.

The astronomer William Rutter Dawes is buried in the churchyard. Episodes of the murder mystery television series Midsomer Murders were filmed on the church grounds.

In the Covid-19 pandemic, the church authorities opted not to reopen St Mary's fully for very much longer than the official guidance recommended, in part because the parish was waiting for a new Rector to arrive. While churches were expected by the Government to be closed from late spring to early summer 2020, St Mary's did not fully re-open until May 2021. As a result, families with young children were unable to attend the church regularly for over a year, meaning they were unable to pass the church attendance test for the local Church of England secondary school. This led to an important ruling by the Office of the Schools Adjudicator about school admissions during the pandemic.

== Organ ==
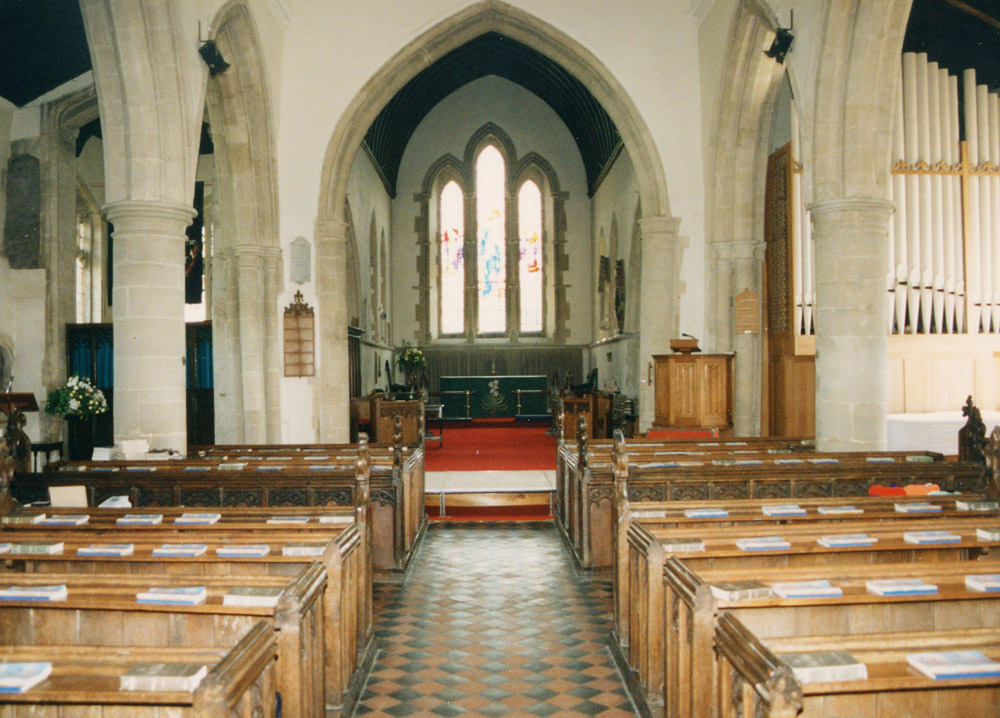
The interior of the Church before the renovations (in 2012)

A pipe organ built by Norman and Beard of Norwich was installed in 1967. The organ had been built in 1916 for a church in London, which was bombed in the Second World War. In 2007 this was replaced because its restoration would cost more than a new instrument so a new electric organ was put in the church as part of the parish's Millennium 2 project.
