= Dorton House =

Georgian mansion in Kent

Coordinates: 51°17′07″N 0°13′08″E

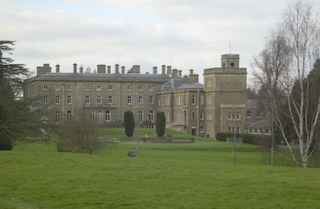
- Interactive map of the Dorton House area

General information
- Type: County house
- Location: Kent
- Current tenants: Retirement community members
- Owner: Elysian Residences

Dorton House or Wildernesse House is a Grade II listed Georgian mansion house in Seal, Kent, near Sevenoaks; until 2013 it was used as the headquarters for the Royal London Society for the Blind (RLSB) and as housing for the blind and partially sighted children who attended its school. Later it was renovated into a retirement community.

== History ==
The house dates to the mid-eighteenth century and is Grade II listed. There is a late nineteenth-century extension, and at the same time the interior was remodelled "in a very rich style, leaving little original work behind". A further extension built when the house was a school is not part of the listing.

An earlier house on the site was built by Sir Charles Bickerstaffe in 1669. In 1884, the house was bought by Charles Henry Mills of Hillingdon who later became 1st Baron Hillingdon. Baron Hillingdon built his own gasworks as well as a laundry and an orphanage from where he employed many of his staff. He was a philanthropist and eventually gave the allotments, recreation ground and village hall to Seal.

In 1923, Wildernesse was sold to a syndicate, becoming a Country Club and Golf Course which had, as an early brochure stated, "probably the most palatial nineteenth hole in England". After use as a sector hospital during the Second World War, Wildernesse continued as a Country Club until 1954. It was used as a children's convalescent home called Oak Bank until it was sold to the RLSB and became known as Dorton House, named after the Society's previous home in a Grade I listed Jacobean mansion in Dorton, Buckinghamshire.

On the Dorton campus the RLSB ran its Nursery and Dorton College as well as a support service for the families of visually impaired children. The age range of the school was 5 to 16, and the last headteacher was Dorothea Hackman.

Dorton House served as a shooting location for the 2012 TV adaptation of Ford Madox Ford's Parade's End.

The RLSB closed Dorton House School in 2013.

Since 2013, retirement village company Elysian Residences bought the building and renamed it back to Wildernesse House. They renovated the interior of the building into retirement apartments and built a series of terraced houses in the estate grounds.
