= Dorton =

Village in Buckinghamshire, England

Coordinates: 51.823°N 1.014°W

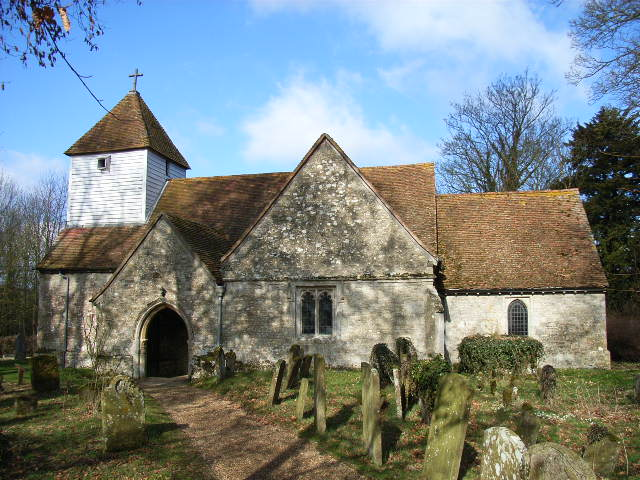
- St John the Baptist parish church

- Location within Buckinghamshire
- Population: 166 (2011 Census)
- OS grid reference: SP6814
- Civil parish: Dorton
- Unitary authority: Buckinghamshire
- Ceremonial county: Buckinghamshire
- Region: South East
- Country: England
- Sovereign state: United Kingdom
- Post town: Aylesbury
- Postcode district: HP18
- Dialling code: 01844
- Police: Thames Valley
- Fire: Buckinghamshire
- Ambulance: South Central
- UK Parliament: Mid Buckinghamshire

Dorton (or Dourton) is a village and civil parish in the Buckinghamshire district of the county of Buckinghamshire, England. It is in the Aylesbury Vale area in the western part of the county, about 5 miles (8 km) north of the Oxfordshire market town of Thame.

== Manor ==
The village toponym is derived from the Old English for "farm at a narrow pass". The Domesday Book of 1086 records it as Dortone, and in the 13th century it was Durtone.

Before the Norman conquest of England Alric, son of Goding, a thegn of Edward the Confessor, held the manor of Dorton. However, the Domesday Book records that by 1086 the Norman baron Walter Giffard held it.

Dorton House is a Grade I listed Jacobean mansion to the south of the village. It is now a preparatory school, Ashfold School.

== Parish church ==
The Church of England parish church of Saint John the Evangelist was originally a chapel of ease to nearby Chilton. St. John's has been a parish in its own right since at least 1590.

The nave and chancel of the church building may be 12th century, as is the bowl of the font. There is a 13th-century lancet window in the nave. The south porch was added in the 13th century, es evidenced by a blocked window of that date in its east wall. In the 14th century the Decorated Gothic south aisle was added, the chancel arch was at least partly rebuilt and the present east window and piscina were added. The present stained glass in the east window is 15th century. The present entrance arch to the porch was added in the 15th century, the base of the font is from the same century and the Perpendicular Gothic window in the south wall of the south aisle was added in about 1480.

St. John's has three bells hung in a timber-framed bell-cot, plus a small Sanctus bell. Bartholomew Atton of Buckingham cast the tenor bell in 1604 and Robert Atton cast the second bell in 1626. John Taylor and Sons cast the treble bell in 1828, presumably at the bell-foundry they then had at Oxford.

== Economic and social history ==
Dorton Spa, a chalybeate spring, is north of the village in Spa Wood. A large pump room and health spa were opened in about 1840 but due to lack of Royal patronage (unlike Royal Leamington Spa and Royal Tunbridge Wells) Dorton Spa declined. Little exists of it now.

The Great Western Railway had the "Bicester cut-off" railway built through the parish in 1910. The line passes within a hundred yards of the village, and in 1937 the GWR opened Dorton Halt to serve it. British Railways closed the halt in 1963. The railway is now part of the Chiltern Main Line.

Dorton was noted in the 1960s and 1970s for the tug-of-war team the Dorton Dons.

== Sources ==
- Page, W.H., ed. (1927). A History of the County of Buckingham, Volume 4. Victoria County History. pp. 45–48.
- Pevsner, Nikolaus (1973) [1966]. Buckinghamshire. The Buildings of England. Harmondsworth: Penguin Books. pp. 110–111. ISBN 0-14-071019-1.
- Reed, Michael (1979). Hoskins, W.G.; Millward, Roy (eds.). The Buckinghamshire Landscape. The Making of the English Landscape. London: Hodder & Stoughton. pp. 74, 127, 260. ISBN 0-340-19044-2.
