= Notley Abbey =

Building in Long Crendon, Buckinghamshire, England

Coordinates: 51.7768°N 0.9645°W

Notley Abbey was an Augustinian abbey founded in the 12th century near Long Crendon, Buckinghamshire, England. A team from Oxford excavated Notley Abbey in 1937, establishing a layout and timeline of the building's construction. The building has been visited by notable figures such as Henry V, and was owned by Laurence Olivier and Vivien Leigh. Today, the remnants of the abbey are owned by the company Bijou Wedding Venues and are used to host weddings.

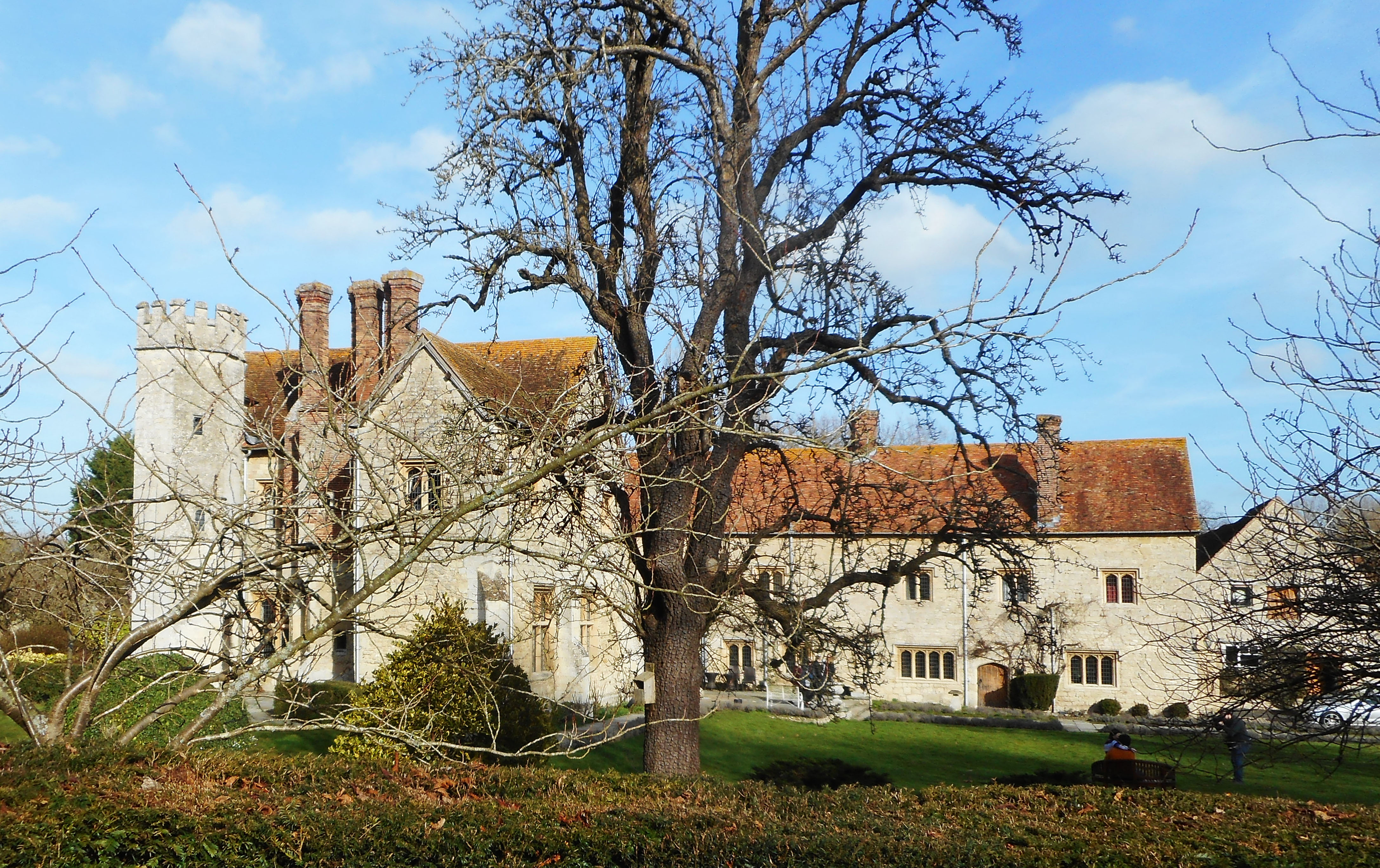
Notley Abbey (geograph 6060371)

== History ==
Notley Abbey was founded in between 1154 and 1164 by the second Earl of Buckingham, Walter Giffard and his wife, Ermengard. The house was dedicated to the Virgin Mary and Saint John the Baptist and was made to house Augustinian canons. Despite its lack of historical fame, Notley Abbey was one of the largest and richest Augustinian monasteries in the Oxford region. Notley Abbey was originally meant to fuse the lifestyles of monastic and apostolic people, forming a middle ground between monks and secular clergy; however, the monastic lifestyle dominated. The fact that Notley Abbey was constructed at Earl's park in Long Crendon suggests that Augustinians were becoming purely monastic by 1160.

Notley Abbey possessed several pieces of land including Lower Winchendon (not acquired until around 1302), Chilton, Princes Risborough, and Stragglethorpe in Lincolnshire. These lands helped generate revenue, but the abbey's primary source of income came from tithes from appropriated churches. Traditionally, a secular vicar served an abbey's appropriated churches, but in 1258, Alexander IV granted Notley Abbey permission to serve their appropriated churches by their own canons in person. In 1461, Notley Abbey absorbed a small priory of Chetwood, thus considerably adding to its revenue sources.

The abbey was visited by Henry IV who stayed there after the battle of Radcot Bridge. Henry V also stayed at Notley Abbey.

Notley Abbey was dissolved by Henry VIII in 1538. By about 1730, the abbey reached farmhouse status, but was regenerated in 1890. The abbot's house and part of the cloister were kept as a private house that remains today.

== Architecture ==
Notley Abbey was originally built based on the medieval architecture (12th and 13th century) popular during the era of its construction. The stone-built main residence is L-shaped and two-storied throughout. The reconstruction of Notley Abbey in 1890 introduced architecture more reminiscent of the late medieval period, specifically in the replacement of Georgian casement windows with those of the Tudor form. When Notley Abbey was excavated in 1937, only the abbot's house and portions of the western and southern claustral buildings were relatively intact. The church was nearly completely underground and, to the disappointment of the excavation team, its foundations had been previously dug up for road repair. Thus, the general plan and dimensions of the church outlined by the team are rough estimates.

The foundation was set in the early 1160s in Romanesque style, and soon after the crossing, transepts, and an eastern wing or choir were built. Around the year 1200, construction continued westward and the nave was joined to the crossing. These western additions followed a different style of architecture, either Early English or transitional. The excavation team estimates that by about a century after the foundation was built, the church and claustral buildings were complete. The eastern wing was extended or redone in the early 14th century. In the 15th century, the central crossing was partially rebuilt in the perpendicular style and the main range of the abbot's house was built. Just about 10 years before the dissolution of the monasteries, the western range of the abbot's house was completed.

== Ownership ==
When Notley Abbey was dissolved, it was given as an enfeoffment to John London.

In 1944, Laurence Olivier and Vivien Leigh purchased the remains of the Abbey, after they found their home destroyed by a bomb raid that took place during the war. During their residence, the couple was known for holding parties at the house. It was also used for the shooting of several films. They lived in the house until 1960, when financial trouble motivated the couple to sell the building to a Canadian couple that had made Olivier a favourable offer.

In 2006, Notley Abbey was purchased by Mark and Jo Cutmore-Scott as part of their company, Bijou Wedding Venues. The house is now hired out for private weddings and events.
