= Long Crendon =

Village in Buckinghamshire, England

Coordinates: 51.773°N 0.997°W

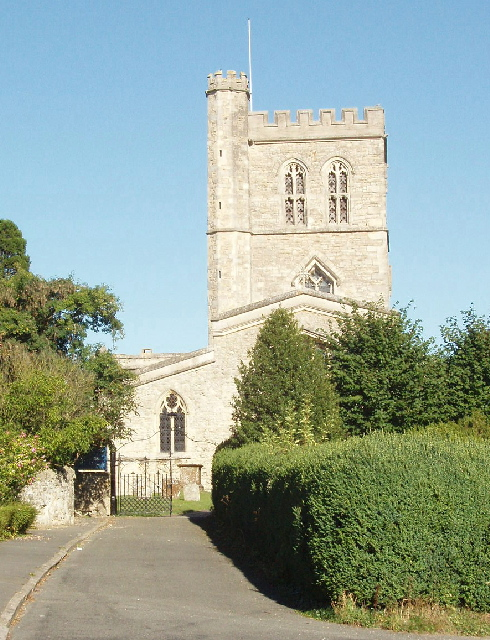
- St. Mary's parish church

- Location within Buckinghamshire
- Population: 2,451 (2011)
- OS grid reference: SP6908
  - London: 42 miles (68 km) SE
- Civil parish: Long Crendon
- Unitary authority: Buckinghamshire
- Ceremonial county: Buckinghamshire
- Region: South East
- Country: England
- Sovereign state: United Kingdom
- Post town: AYLESBURY
- Postcode district: HP18
- Dialling code: 01844
- Police: Thames Valley
- Fire: Buckinghamshire
- Ambulance: South Central
- UK Parliament: Mid Buckinghamshire
- Website: Long Crendon Village

Long Crendon is a village and civil parish in west Buckinghamshire, England, about 3 miles (5 km) west of Haddenham and 2 miles (3 km) north-west of Thame in neighbouring Oxfordshire. The village has been called Long Crendon only since the English Civil War. The "Long" prefix refers to the length of the village at that time, and was added to differentiate it from nearby Grendon Underwood, which used to be known as "Crendon". This name is Old English and means 'Creoda's Hill' (in 1086 it was listed in the Domesday Book as Crededone).

== History ==
"Crendon" was the caput of the feudal honour held by Walter Giffard (died 1102), created Earl of Buckingham by William the Conqueror. The Manor in Long Crendon was once a great building that housed the later Earls of Buckingham and over the years the various manorial estates in the village have passed through the hands of the Crown, Oxford University, the Earls of March and the Marquis of Buckingham. The latter is now the Lord of the manor of Long Crendon.

In 1162, an order of Augustinian (see Arrouaise) monks was founded in the village at nearby Notley Abbey. The park in which the abbey stood was donated to the abbey itself by the incumbent of the manor, the Earl of Buckingham. At the time of the dissolution of the monasteries the annual income was calculated as over £437, an immense amount of money for the time. The abbey still stands, but as a secular manor house. In the 20th century it was the marital home of actors Sir Laurence Olivier and Vivien Leigh.

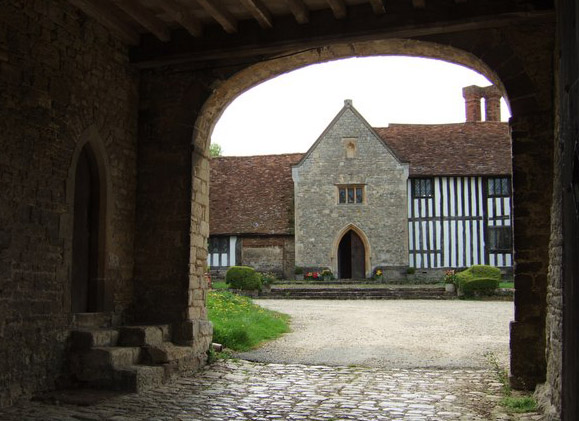
The Manor, Long Crendon

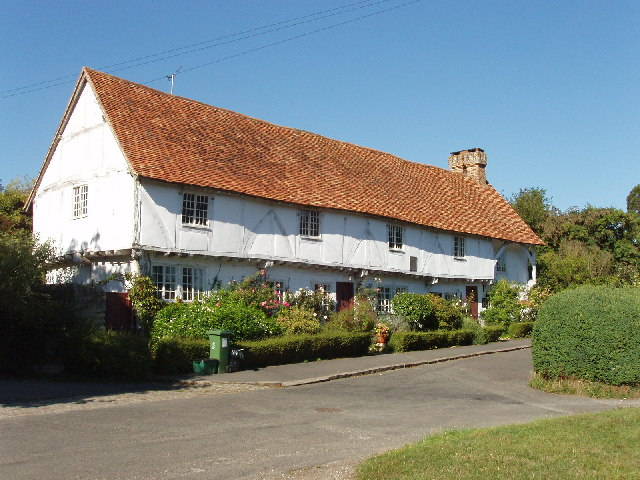
Long Crendon Courthouse

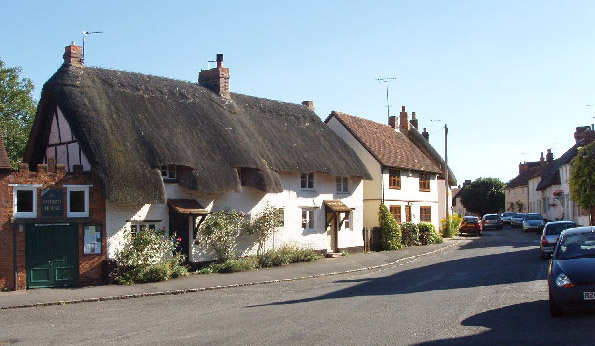
Thatched houses in Long Crendon

In 1218, Long Crendon was granted a royal charter to hold a weekly market; the monies from which were to be collected by William Earl Marshal who owned the manor at that time. The town was certainly important in this period as it shared the distinction with Aylesbury as being the only places in the whole of England where needles were made. The royal charter was later rescinded and the market moved and joined with the existing one in nearby Thame.

The Church of England parish church of St Mary dates from the 12th century. The building has undergone several major renovations and refurbishments since 2007. The village has also a Baptist church and a Catholic church.

Long Crendon Courthouse is a 15th-century timber-frame building. Manorial courts were held here from the reign of King Henry V until the Victorian era. The National Trust bought the courthouse in 1900. The lower floor is residential; the upper floor can be visited.

There was a Long Crendon Rural District from 1894 to 1934.

== Amenities ==
The village has two public houses, a brewery (the XT Brewing Company), and a Village Association hall. Long Crendon School is a mixed, community school, which has about 240 pupils from the ages of four to 11.

Long Crendon has two youth football clubs. Crendon Corinthians Youth Football Club (CCYFC) has over 250 members, with 18 teams, including four girls' teams, across 11 age groups, from U6 to U18. The teams compete in three different leagues: the South Bucks Mini Soccer Conference U7-U10, the Booker Wholesale League U11–U16, and the Bucks Girls League (with U11, U13, U15 and U18 teams). The club was awarded FA Charter Standard status in 2004 and was named as the Berks & Bucks FA Charter Standard Club of the Year in June 2010. Long Crendon Youth FC is also an FA Charter Standard club, and fields an U18 team, which competes in the South Bucks Youth League. Long Crendon also has a Bowls Club, established in 1921 and a separate Tennis Club. There is also a Scout Group named Bernwood Forest Group after the ancient hunting forest of Henry VIII that was in the area.

Midsomer Murders, the ITV crime series, is often filmed in Long Crendon with locals as extras. Scenes from the series Jeeves and Wooster, with Stephen Fry and Hugh Laurie, were also filmed in Long Crendon.

== Sources ==
- Birch, Clive (1975). The Book of Aylesbury. Chesham: Barracuda Books. pp. not stated.
- Mills, A.D.; Room, A. (2003). A Dictionary of British Place-Names. Oxford: Oxford University Press. p. not cited. ISBN 0-19-852758-6.
- Page, W.H., ed. (1905). A History of the County of Buckingham, Volume 1. Victoria County History. Archibald Constable & Co. pp. 377–380.
- Page, W.H., ed. (1927). A History of the County of Buckingham, Volume 4. Victoria County History. Archibald Constable & Co. pp. 36–45.
- Pevsner, Nikolaus (1973) [1966]. Buckinghamshire. The Buildings of England. Harmondsworth: Penguin Books. pp. 194–196. ISBN 0-14-071019-1.
