= Aubrey Hames =

Welsh Labour politician (1923–1998)

Edward Aubrey Hames (19 January 1923 – 8 June 1998) was a Welsh Labour politician who served on Newport Borough Council from 1954 to 1961 and from 1970 until his retirement in 1987. He became leader of the council following local-government reorganisation in 1974 and served as mayor of Newport in 1977–78. He was also a member of Gwent County Council and served as leader of the Welsh Committee of District Councils. At the time of his death Hames was one of three people since 1945 to be awarded freedom of the county borough of Newport.

Hames was involved in several major decisions affecting the development of Newport. He opposed a proposed motorway through the centre of the town in favour of the northern bypass, subsequently incorporated into the M4, and supported construction of a separate crossing of the River Usk. He promoted the repair of older housing in preference to wholesale clearance, introduced a £1-a-house scheme for council-owned properties awaiting redevelopment and supported the rehabilitation of housing in Baneswell. As council leader, he was also closely involved in the development and financing of Newport Centre.

In 1979, committal proceedings arising from Hames's employment at Cardiff Docks ended when the court found that there was no case to answer. An industrial tribunal subsequently found that he had been unfairly dismissed. His treatment was examined by HTV Wales in 1983 and revisited by ITV Cymru Wales in 2024. Hames was appointed Newport's first Honorary Alderman in 1987, a road was named after him the following year, and he received the Freedom of Newport in 1998.

== Early life and military service ==
Hames was born Edward Aubrey Hames in Sebastopol, near Pontypool, on 19 January 1923 and grew up principally in Griffithstown. He enlisted in the British Army in January 1939, shortly after his sixteenth birthday. During the Second World War he served in Britain and India, where he trained as a glider pilot, and subsequently served with the Glider Pilot Regiment in Mandatory Palestine. While in Palestine, he joined the Fabian Society in February 1947. He returned to Britain in July 1947 and left the Army with the rank of sergeant in January 1949.

== Political career ==
After leaving the Army, Hames joined Newtown Labour Party and was elected its social secretary in January 1950. He returned to Newport later that year and became active in the Malpas branch of the Labour Party, through which he raised issues including housing, health provision and accommodation for chronically ill people.

Hames first contested Newport's Caerau ward in 1953. After a recount, he lost by one vote in what was reported as the first Newport municipal election to be decided by that margin. He contested the ward again in May 1954 and was elected to Newport Borough Council with a majority of 343.

Hames also sought selection as a Labour parliamentary candidate. In 1966, he was unanimously included on a five-person shortlist drawn from approximately 110 nominees for the Newport constituency and finished runner-up to Roy Hughes, who was subsequently elected as Newport's MP. Hames again sought consideration when the new Newport West constituency was created in 1983, but his Stow Hill ward did not nominate him.

Together with Alan Shewring and Tony Boyle, Hames founded St Joseph's Roman Catholic High School in Newport.

== Housing and urban renewal ==
After returning to Newport Borough Council in 1970, Hames represented Central ward, which included part of Pillgwenlly. In July 1970, he persuaded the council to remove houses in fifteen streets from its redevelopment programme, ending the formal planning blight affecting them. He advocated repairing and modernising suitable existing houses rather than pursuing wholesale clearance.

In October 1971, Hames proposed that habitable council-owned houses awaiting redevelopment should be sold for £1 to local residents who would occupy and repair them. Purchasers could not rent or sublet the properties and were required to return them to the council for the same sum when they were needed for redevelopment. The first participating family moved into a three-bedroom house in April 1972, and the scheme attracted enquiries from across Britain. By keeping properties occupied and maintained, it allowed some houses previously intended for demolition to be rehabilitated when housing policy subsequently changed.

Hames also supported efforts to retain and improve housing in Baneswell. Baneswell Housing Association acquired vacant council-owned houses for £1, repaired them and rented them to local residents. Following the Housing Act 1974, Hames promoted the establishment of Housing Action Areas through which older properties were improved rather than demolished. These measures contributed to the retention of housing and the established community in Baneswell.

== Newport road and bridge campaign ==
A northern bypass for Newport was proposed after the Second World War to remove long-distance traffic from the congested A48 through the town. Its route was approved following a public inquiry in 1947 and fixed in 1948, although construction was delayed. Newport Council also sought a second crossing of the River Usk for local traffic. In 1958, Transport Minister Harold Watkinson proposed an alternative motorway-style throughway across central Newport that would combine the functions of the bypass and the second river crossing.

The proposed route included elevated roads through built-up areas, a tunnel and a high-level crossing of the Usk. Hames organised a group of predominantly younger councillors who opposed the scheme, which he described as a "concrete monstrosity". Contemporary estimates suggested that hundreds of houses would be demolished and as many as 3,000 people displaced. He instead advocated construction of the northern bypass, with five junctions serving Newport, together with a separate central bridge for local traffic.

Hames also argued that the northern bypass offered Newport a better financial arrangement. The government would meet the cost of the bypass, while a separate bridge would qualify for substantial government support. By contrast, Newport would contribute towards the throughway and bear much of the associated rehousing cost. Hames set out his financial and traffic arguments in letters published by the South Wales Argus in December 1958. In July 1959, Watkinson informed a Newport delegation that the government intended to construct the northern bypass regardless of the council's preference and would not meet all the throughway's rehousing costs. On 25 August 1959, Newport Council rejected the central route by 43 votes to two.

The previously approved northern bypass—which had been fixed before Hames entered the council and included the Brynglas Tunnels—was subsequently constructed and incorporated into the M4. Watkinson's rejected central throughway would also have required a tunnel while carrying motorway and local traffic through central Newport. The separate George Street Bridge received a 75 per cent government grant and opened in 1964. Its total cost, including the Wharf Road approach, was approximately £2.1 million, of which Newport contributed just over £500,000.

== Council leadership and Newport Centre ==
Following local-government reorganisation in 1974, Hames became leader of Newport District Council and was elected to the newly created Gwent County Council, where he chaired its finance subcommittee. He subsequently became leader of the Welsh Committee of District Councils. Hames served as mayor of Newport in 1977–78 and returned as council leader in May 1978.

During his period as leader, the council developed Newport Centre, a combined leisure, sporting and entertainment complex originally proposed and championed by Councillor Ron Jones. The proposal encountered considerable opposition, with some councillors arguing that the available money should be spent on housing and others warning that ratepayers could be repaying its cost for 30 years. Hames worked with council officers to accumulate reserves, obtain government grants and reduce the amount that needed to be financed through conventional borrowing.

Newport Centre opened in July 1985. Contemporary newspaper coverage reported that it was delivered below budget and that the financing arrangements enabled the cost to be paid in approximately eight years rather than the 30 years initially feared. The Centre subsequently became a major Welsh venue for sport, concerts, theatre and other entertainment.

== British Transport Docks Board case ==
Hames joined the British Transport Commission's docks undertaking at Newport in 1950 and became an assistant docks manager in 1963. After working at Newport and Port Talbot, he was appointed assistant docks manager at Cardiff in 1965. In 1977, while he was on leave to serve as mayor of Newport, British Transport Police began investigating allegations of corruption involving commercial arrangements at Cardiff Docks. Hames was subsequently suspended and, in October 1978, summoned on charges of corruption and conspiracy alongside two other men.

The case was heard at Cardiff Stipendiary Magistrates over five days between 26 February and 2 March 1979. The conspiracy charge was withdrawn after the prosecution's accounting witness said that he could not determine whether the disputed payments were improper. A corruption allegation concerning a family holiday was dismissed after evidence was produced that Hames had paid for it, and substitute deception charges were also dismissed. The court found that there was no case to answer.

Shortly before the criminal proceedings began, the Docks Board dismissed Hames without giving him an opportunity to respond to its allegations. In July 1979, an industrial tribunal found that he had been unfairly dismissed following what it described as a "serious breach of the principles of natural justice" and that he had made no contribution to his dismissal. The tribunal recommended his reinstatement and awarded him £11,635, the statutory maximum and reportedly the largest compensation award made by a British industrial tribunal at that time. The Docks Board declined to reinstate him.

In March 1983, following a five-month investigation, HTV Wales's Wales This Week broadcast a report entitled "Corruption" examining Hames's case. The programme reconstructed the collapse of the proceedings and quoted the industrial tribunal's findings. Philip Thomas, a senior lecturer in law at University College Cardiff, described the prosecution case as "worthless", while Paul Flynn, then a member of the Docks Board's South Wales local board, called Hames's treatment a "monstrous injustice". The case was revisited by ITV Cymru Wales in 2024.

== Later public and charitable work ==
Hames remained involved in public and charitable organisations after retiring from Newport Council in 1987. A contemporary South Wales Argus profile reported that he intended to continue working with nearly 50 organisations. His roles included chairing Newport Transport Board and Newport Housing Association, with which he had been involved since its establishment.

Hames also served as chairman of Newport Action for the Single Homeless (NASH), established in 1983 to support single homeless and vulnerable people. The organisation subsequently expanded its services across Wales and became known as Solas.

== Honours, death and reputation ==
When Hames retired from Newport Council in 1987, councillors proposed granting him the Freedom of Newport. He declined, saying that conferring the honour on a politician would devalue it. On 28 May 1987, the council instead appointed him Newport's first Honorary Alderman without informing him beforehand.

In 1988, Newport's Conservative opposition proposed that a new road in Hames's former ward should be named after him. The council unanimously approved the name Aubrey Hames Close. The South Wales Argus reported that he was the only politician in Gwent to have a road named after him during his lifetime.

Hames subsequently accepted the Freedom of Newport, which was conferred on 19 February 1998. He was the first person to receive the honour for more than 40 years and the first man since Field Marshal Montgomery in 1945. Hames died at the Royal Gwent Hospital on 8 June 1998.

The South Wales Argus reported his funeral on its front page under the headline "A Farewell to Legends" and described him as "the citizen who perhaps above all others etched his name upon the town's heart". In 2024, ITV News described Hames as one of Wales's best-known local councillors of the 1970s and 1980s and as having had one of the highest profiles of any council leader in Wales.
