= Anomalously numbered roads in Great Britain =

In the Great Britain road numbering scheme, the country is divided into numbered zones, the boundaries of which are usually defined by single-digit roads. The first digit of a road's number should be the number of the zone it occupies. If the road occupies multiple zones, then the furthest-anticlockwise zone is the correct one. The following tables list all British roads which are anomalously numbered. Roads in bold lie completely outside their "correct" zone; all other roads run for some length in their "correct" zones but trespass into zones anticlockwise of this zone. A further table lists duplicated road numbers.

== Motorways ==
The motorway zone boundaries are different from the A-road boundaries.

Motorway number zones of England and Wales

Road number	Location	Trespassed zone	Reason
**M48**	**Gloucestershire, Monmouthshire**	**Zone 5**	This road used to be the M4, and as it lies to the north of the current M4 and to the west of the M5, it is in the Motorway Zone 5.
**M49**	**Bristol, Gloucestershire**	**Zone 3**	This motorway lies entirely within zone 3. The motorway was constructed at the same time as the Second Severn Crossing, and it is likely that the sequential M48 and M49 were used for the old M4 and the new motorway respectively.
M62	Merseyside, Greater Manchester	Zone 5	The section from Liverpool to Manchester was planned as M52, but was added to the M62 to make a cross-country route.
M65	Lancashire	Zone 5	The short link to the A582 is out of zone

While the M25 may appear to contradict these rules as it runs through all the London-bound zones, it in fact does not: it does not quite form a complete circle. It starts in Zone 2, south of the Thames, and proceeds clockwise through zones 3, 4 and 1. The A282, which completes the circle mostly formed by the M25, is anomalously numbered; as it proceeds into the A-road 1-zone (and should therefore begin with a 1).

The M271 is numbered as a spur of the M27, as opposed to the traditional numbering rules; however the M3 to Southampton came after the M271 was built and is not the zone boundary, which appears to be a straight line from M3 J8 to Exeter in some documentation.

== A roads ==
The numbering zones for all-purpose roads in Great Britain

Road number	Location	Trespassed zone(s)	Reason
A14	Northamptonshire	Zone 5 & 6	The A14 was chosen as a unique, important number for this crucial cross-country route.
A31	Surrey	Zone 2	Formerly north-east of the A3 before the Guildford Bypass.
**A42**	**Leicestershire**	**Zone 5**	The A42 is numbered as an extension of the M42.
A51	Warwickshire	Zone 4	Extended over an orphaned section of the A423 when part of that road NW of Coventry was downgraded to B class.
A55	Anglesey	Zone 4	The A55 supersedes the A5 through Anglesey.
A66	Cumbria	Zone 5	The A66 was extended westwards beyond the A6 to make it a coast-to-coast route.
**A88**	**Falkirk**	**Zone 9**	Planned to extend westwards to form the A80 to Kincardine Bridge road - this instead became the M876.
A89	Glasgow	Zone 7	The A89 through Glasgow used to be partly the A8.
A91	Stirling	Zone 8	Rerouted to bypass Stirling. Meets the A9 at Greencornhills Roundabout yet continues into Zone 8 as far as the Bannockburn Interchange.
A167	Durham	Zone 6	The A167 through Durham used to be part of the A1.
A168	North Yorkshire	Zone 6	The A168 originally only went from Northallerton to Dishforth, and was extended by the former A1 when it was upgraded in 1994, changing the most westerly point to a different zone.
A177	Durham	Zone 6	In County Durham the original A1 route (now A167), not the A1(M) motorway, forms the zone boundary.
A181	Durham	Zone 6	In County Durham the original A1 route (now A167), not the A1(M) motorway, forms the zone boundary.
A199	East Lothian	Zone 6	The A199 used to be part of the A1. (With respect to the Scottish numbering hub of Edinburgh, the A199 is in fact correctly numbered as Zone 1 is anticlockwise from Zone 6 when viewed this way.)
A282	Thurrock	Zone 1	New road which is important and assigned an A2xx number as most A1xx numbers were already used (as zone 1 is far larger than zone 2). Could have been A108 or A122, both unused numbers at present.
A307	Surrey	Zone 2	The A307 used to be part of the A3.
A320	Surrey	Zone 2	Formerly north-east of the A3 before the Guildford Bypass.
A322	Surrey	Zone 2	Formerly north-east of the A3 before the Guildford Bypass.
**A397**	**Portsmouth**	**Zone 2**	The A397 used to be part of the A3.
A404	Windsor and Maidenhead	Zone 3	The A404 originally began on the A4 1.7 miles west of where it now passes under where the A404(M) passes under the A4 and loses its motorway status. The change in route took place in September 1992 when the A404 was rerouted and took over the what was previously the A423(M) which itself had originally been part of the M4.
A412	Slough	Zone 3	The A412 begins in Zone 3, at the A332.
**A427**	**Northamptonshire**	**Zone 6**	The A427 previously ran from Coventry to Oundle, and was truncated west of Market Harborough, when the new A14 opened. This section was renumbered as the B4027, A4303 and A4304. An even older alignment (pre-c.1960s) heading south from North Kilworth as far as the A45 is now an unclassified road (formerly B5414) and A4071.
A447	Leicestershire	Zone 5	Route south of the A47 decommissioned, leaving the remainder out-of-zone.
A505	Bedfordshire	Zone 4	The A505 was extended to become a cross-country route.
**A601**	**Derby**	**Zone 5**	Chosen as a unique number for the Derby inner ring road.
**A620**	**Nottinghamshire**	**Zone 1**	The A620 was truncated and left east of the A1.
A624	Chapel-en-le-Frith, Derbyshire	Zone 5	The A624 was part of the A6 for a short stretch in Chapel-en-le-Frith before the Chapel by-pass was built.
A683	Lancashire	Zone 5	The A683 was extended westwards to Heysham docks.
A688	Durham	Zone 1	Extended east of the A167 (former A1) in the 1980s.
A689	Cumbria	Zone 5	The A689 was extended south-westwards around Carlisle from M6 J44 to the A595 in the 5 zone. (It passes through the 7 zone as well between the A7 and River Eden, but the actual boundary between the 5 and 7 zones is undefined, and a road crossing the A7 would be correctly numbered starting 6, as zone 6 is anticlockwise of zone 7 as viewed from the numbering hub of Edinburgh.)
A720	Edinburgh	Zone 6	The A720 bypasses the numbering hub of Edinburgh, making numbering difficult; A720 was chosen for apparent importance. Most important 6-zone numbers were all used. Also notably distant from all other A72x roads.
**A882**	**Highland**	**Zone 9**	The A9 was rerouted to terminate at Scrabster rather than John O'Groats, leaving the A882 in zone 9.
A899	West Lothian	Zone 7	The A899 was extended south through Livingston new town, Scotland.
A904	Falkirk	Zone 8	The A9 was rerouted to bypass Falkirk town centre.
A949	Highland	Zone 8	The A949 used to be part of the A9.
A1000	Hertfordshire	Zone 6	The A1000 used to be part of the A1.
**A1057**	**Hertfordshire**	**Zone 6**	The A1057 used to be part of the A1.
A1068	Northumberland	Zone 6	The A1 was rerouted around Alnwick, leaving the end of A1068 out-of-zone.
A1081	Hertfordshire	Zone 6	The A1081 used to be part of the A6.
**A1246**	**North Yorkshire**	**Zone 6**	The A1246 used to be part of the A1.
**A3023**	**Hampshire**	**Zone 2**	The A3023 was originally the B2149.
**A3100**	**Surrey**	**Zone 2**	The A3100 used to be part of the A3.
**A3400**	**Warwickshire**	**Zone 4**	The road was numbered to reflect its history as the old A34.
A4174	Bristol	Zone 3	The A4174 is part of the Bristol outer ring road. It was entirely in zone 4 but has been extended to the A4 and then south of it.
**A4208**	**London**	**Zone 3**	Truncation of the A4 left the A4208 out-of-zone.
**A4300**	**Northamptonshire**	**Zone 5**	The A4300 used to be part of the A43.
**A4303**	**Leicestershire**	**Zone 5**	The A4303 used to be part of the A427.
**A4304**	**Leicestershire**	**Zone 5**	The A4304 used to be part of the A427.
**A4500**	**Northamptonshire**	**Zone 5**	The A4500 used to be part of the A45.
**A4501**	**Northamptonshire**	**Zone 5**	The A4501 used to be part of the A45.
A5127	Staffordshire, West Midlands	Zone 4	The A5127 was extended south when the A38 bypassed Sutton Coldfield. The entire A5127 was part of the original route of the A38.
**A5140**	**Bedfordshire**	**Zone 4**	Much of the route became A421 when it was extended, leaving only the section in Bedford, which is out-of-zone as it is east of the A6.
**A5153**	**Anglesey**	**Zone 4**	The A5153 lies south of the A5.
**A5154**	**Anglesey**	**Zone 4**	The A5154 used to be part of the A5.
A5223	Telford	Zone 4	Route begins south of the A5.
A6004	Leicestershire	Zone 5	The A6004 used to be part of the A6.
A6010	Manchester	Zone 5	The A6010 is part of the Manchester ring road.
**A6143**	**Manchester**	**Zone 5**	The A6143 was originally part of the A57.
**A6144**	**Trafford**	**Zone 5**	The A6144 used to be the B5166, B5311 and B5158.
**A6182**	**Doncaster**	**Zone 1**	The A1 was rerouted leaving the A6182 out-of-zone.

== B roads ==
Road number	Location	Trespassed zone	Reason
B197	Hertfordshire	Zone 6	The B197 used to be part of the A1
**B316**	**London**	**Zone 4**	A4 rerouted
**B325**	**London**	**Zone 4**	A4 rerouted
**B384**	**West Midlands**	**Zone 4**	Used to be part of the A38, and numbered to match. (Initially numbered B38 by Birmingham City Council.)
B455	London	Zone 3	A4 rerouted
B470	Windsor and Maidenhead	Zone 3	A portion of the route was formerly part of the A331.
**B576**	**Northamptonshire**	**Zone 6**	A6 rerouted
**B589**	**Loughborough**	**Zone 6**	Route now runs on the wrong side of the A6.
B645	Northamptonshire	Zone 5	A6 rerouted
B704	Midlothian	Zone 6	Extends through Gorebridge whilst A7 forms western bypass.
**B708**	**West Lothian**	**Zone 8**	Was previously numbered as B8708 in keeping with the scheme.
**B855**	**Highland**	**Zone 9**	The A9 was rerouted west of this road, to end at Scrabster.
**B876**	**Highland**	**Zone 9**	The A9 was rerouted west of this road, to end at Scrabster.
B1043	Cambridgeshire	Zone 6	The B1043 used to be part of the A1.
B1164	Nottinghamshire	Zone 6	The B1164 used to be part of the A1.
B1198	Durham	Zone 6	In County Durham the original A1 route (now A167), not the A1(M) motorway, forms the zone boundary.
B1217	Leeds	Zone 6	extended along old A642 when M1 extended
B1224	North Yorkshire	Zone 6	In County Durham the original A1 route (now A167), not the A1(M) motorway, forms the zone boundary.
B1284	Durham	Zone 6	In County Durham the original A1 route (now A167), not the A1(M) motorway, forms the zone boundary.
B1350	Edinburgh	Zone 9	Although the B1350 is a continuation of London Road the remaining mile of the A1 is to the south at this point.
B2215	Surrey	Zone 2	The B2215 used to be part of the A3.
B3000	Surrey	Zone 2	A3 rerouted
B3004	Hampshire	Zone 2	A3 rerouted
B3006	Hampshire	Zone 2	A3 rerouted
**B3345**	**Reading**	**Zone 4**	A4 rerouted
**B3800**	**West Midlands**	**Zone 4**	The B3800 used to be part of the A4040.
**B4640**	**West Berkshire**	**Zone 3**	Formerly a portion of the pre-bypass A34; unknown why B4640 was chosen as it has no relation to the A34.
**B4666**	**Hinckley, Leicestershire**	**Zone 5**	The B4666 used to be part of the A47.
**B4667**	**Hinckley, Leicestershire**	**Zone 5**	The B4667 used to be part of the A447.
**B4668**	**Hinckley, Leicestershire**	**Zone 5**	The B4668 used to be part of the A47.
**B4669**	**Leicestershire**	**Zone 5**	Originally numbered B579 and later became A5070. A5070 was renumbered B4069 following completion of the M69, and gained its present number around 1990 as part of a renumbering plan in Hinckley.
**B5010**	**East Midlands**	**Zone 6**	A5 rerouted
**B5011**	**Brownhills**	**Zone 4**	Section north of the A5 declassified, leaving the southern section out-of-zone.
B5061	Shropshire	Zone 4	A5 rerouted
**B5070**	**Wrexham**	**Zone 4**	The B5070 used to be part of the A5.
**B5072**	**Telford**	**Zone 4**	A correct zone B5072 existed in Nantwich until the 1930s. Became part of A530.
**B5444**	**Swansea**	**Zone 4**	Originally part of the B4292 until it was upgraded in the 1960s as A4217. When the central section was rerouted, the bypassed section was returned to Class II status with the current number, despite it being a duplicate and out-of-zone.
**B5477**	**Shropshire**	**Zone 4**	This was, until renumbered in 2004, the northern section of the B4370 (Little Stretton - Church Stretton - All Stretton); additionally the number was (and remains) in separate use in Wallasey.
**B6000**	**Derby**	**Zone 5**	A6 rerouted
**B6184**	**Stockport**	**Zone 5**	The B6184 used to be part of the B5465.
B6241	Preston, Lancashire	Zone 5	The B6241 was extended west of the A6.
**B6280**	**Darlington**	**Zone 1**	In County Durham the original A1 route (now A167), not the A1(M) motorway, forms the zone boundary.
**B6291**	**Durham**	**Zone 1**	The original section within Zone 6 was renumbered to become an extension of the A688.
**B6420**	**Nottinghamshire**	**Zone 1**	The A1 was re-routed, leaving its start-point out of zone.
**B6469**	**Manchester**	**Zone 5**	Originally numbered A57 west of the A6 and A635 to the east; probably downgraded due to construction of the A57(M).
**B6541**	**Middlesbrough**	**Zone 1**	The B6541 used to be part of the A66.
**B7201**	**Dumfries and Galloway**	**Zone 6**	The B7201 was part of the A7 before bypass of Canonbie; was B720 beforehand.
B8046	West Lothian	Zone 7	The B8046 was extended beyond both the old A8 and the M8 as far as Mid Calder, absorbing the B767.
**B9080**	**West Lothian**	**Zone 8**	The B9080 used to be part of the A9.
**B9150**	**Highland**	**Zone 8**	The B9150 used to be part of the A9.
B9163	Highland	Zone 8	A9 rerouted
**B9164**	**Highland**	**Zone 8**	A9 rerouted
B9169	Highland	Zone 8	A9 rerouted
**B9176**	**Highland**	**Zone 8**	The B9176 used to be part of the A9
B9177	Highland	Zone 8	The B9177 used to be part of the A9

== Irregularities not based on the zoning system ==
Road number	Location	Reason
A135	Stockton-on-Tees	The other A13x roads are in southern England.
A139	Stockton-on-Tees	The other A13x roads are in southern England.
A154	Felixstowe	The other A15x roads are in Lincolnshire.
A176	Basildon, Essex	The other A17x roads are in North Yorkshire or County Durham.
A180	Grimsby	The other A18x roads are in the North East. The A180 is numbered as an extension of the M180.
A249	Maidstone - Sheerness, Kent	The other A24x roads are in Surrey.
A278	M2 - Gillingham	The other A27x roads are in Sussex.
A282	Dartford - Thurrock	The other A28x roads are in Sussex.
A289	Strood - Medway Tunnel - Gillingham	The other A28x roads are in Sussex. Number was originally unused.
A303	Hampshire - Somerset	The other A30x roads are in Surrey and Southwest London.
A403	Avonmouth, South Gloucestershire	The other A40x roads are in or around Greater London
A437	Hillingdon, Greater London	The other A43x roads are around the Cotswolds.
A491	Bromsgrove - Stourbridge	The other A49x roads are in North Wales.
A500	Stoke-on-Trent "D"-road	The other A50x roads are in London, southern England and Northamptonshire
A506	Liverpool	The other A50x roads are in London, southern England and Northamptonshire
A598	Barnet, Greater London	The other A59x roads are in Cumbria (but see A594 below)
A599	Haydock	The other A59x roads are in Cumbria. Number was originally unused.
A720	Edinburgh City Bypass, Edinburgh	The other A72x roads are mostly to the south and southeast of Glasgow.
A1018	Tyne and Wear	The other A101x roads are in East London and Essex
A1300	South Shields	The other A130x roads are in Essex and Cambridgeshire.
A1305	Stockton-on-Tees	The other A130x roads are in Essex and Cambridgeshire.
A2022	London & Surrey	The other A202x roads are in Sussex.
A2219	Crawley	The other A220x and A221x roads are in London.
A2220	Crawley	The other A220x and A221x roads are in London, (there are no other A222x roads)
A3031	South London	The other A303x roads are in Southwest England.
A3036	South London	The other A303x roads are in Southwest England. The route used to be the A303, before it got moved to its current route.
A3113	London Heathrow Airport	The other A311x roads are on the Isles of Scilly.
A4010	Buckinghamshire	The other A401x roads are in Cheltenham and Bristol.
A4012	Bedfordshire	The other A401x roads are in Cheltenham and Bristol.
A4020	West London	The other A402x roads are in the West Midlands. The road is numbered after the A402 road, which the A4020 terminates on at its eastern end at Shepherd's Bush.
A4032	Bristol	The other A403x roads are in the West Midlands.
A4041	West Midlands	The other A404x roads are in the country of Wales.
A4053	Coventry Ring Road, Coventry	The other A405x roads are in the country of Wales.
B77	Maybole	All other B roads in Great Britain are three or four digits.

== Two clearly separate roads with the same number ==
Road number	Locations			Notes
A423	Oxford	Banbury		The section in-between was renumbered to A4260.
A479	Brecon Beacons	Wembley		
A594 (Cumbria/Leicester)	Cumbria	Leicester		The Cumbria version predates the Leicester version.
A728	South Glasgow	North Glasgow		
A1042	Redcar	Norwich		The Redcar version predates the Norwich version.
A1056	Newcastle upon Tyne	Norwich		The Newcastle version predates the Norwich version.
A1114	Chelmsford	Gateshead		
A1199	Islington	Woodford		Both are in Greater London.
A1243	Great Yarmouth	Grimsby		
A4102	Amblecote	Merthyr Tydfil		The Amblecote version predates the Merthyr Tydfil version.
A5028	Seacombe	Northamptonshire		
A5152	Wrexham	Anglesey		
A5271	Stoke-on-Trent	Keswick, Cumbria		
A6013	Derbyshire	Kettering		
B198	Wisbech	Cheshunt		
B454	Kingsbury	West London		
B667	Leicester	Thurmaston		
B1140	Norwich	Wroxham		
B1172	Spalding	Norfolk		
B2118	Albourne	Brighton		
B2122	Surrey	Brighton		
B2193	Portslade-by-Sea	Lewes		
B3153	Somerset	Weymouth		
B3165	Somerset	Surrey		
B3206	Devon	Surrey		
B3330	Winchester	Isle of Wight		
B3331	Winchester	Isle of Wight		
B3440	Weston-super-Mare	Devon		
B4065	Droitwich	Warwickshire		
B4082	Worcestershire	Coventry		
B4100	Birmingham	Oxfordshire, Warwickshire		
B4104	Meriden	Kenilworth		
B4105	Coventry	Solihull		
B4118	Birmingham	Coventry		
B4122	Birmingham	Wiltshire		
B4587	Dudley	Wiltshire		
B4623	Acton	Caerphilly		
B4624	Llandysul	Evesham		
B5120	Dunstable	Prestatyn		
B5142	Wirral	Weaverham		
B5144	Wirral	Weaverham		
B5192	Kirkby	Kirkham	Wirral	Only number that exists in three locations.
B5207	Netherton	Lancashire		
B5210	Central Warrington	Warrington		
B5320	Lake District	Salford		
B5444	Mold	Swansea		The Swansea version is out-of-zone.
B5477	Wallasey	Church Stretton		The Church Stretton version is out-of-zone.
B6135	Drighlington	Yorkshire		
B6265	North Yorkshire	West Yorkshire		
B6322	Haltwhistle	Consett		
B6374	Roxburghshire	Derbyshire		
B6452	Galashiels	Rochdale		
B6461	Ollerton	Scottish Borders		
B6481	Leeds	Corby		
B9178	Dulnain Bridge	Peterhead		
