= Great Britain road numbering scheme =

The numbering zones for A & B roads in Great Britain

Great Britain has a numbering scheme used to classify and identify all roads. Each road is given a single letter (representing a category) and a subsequent number (between one and four digits). Though this scheme was introduced merely to simplify funding allocations, it soon became used on maps and as a method of navigation. There are two sub-schemes in use: one for motorways, and another for non-motorway roads.

While some of Great Britain's major roads form part of the international E-road network, no E-routes are signposted in the United Kingdom. Due to changes in local road designation, in some cases roads are numbered out of zone. There are also instances where two unrelated roads have been given exactly the same number; for example, the Leicester Ring Road and a road in Cumbria are both designated A594.

This scheme applies only to England, Scotland and Wales; a separate system using similar conventions is used in Northern Ireland, as well as outside the United Kingdom in the Isle of Man, Jersey and British Overseas Territories.

== History ==
Work on classification began in 1913. The Road Board had been established in 1909 to administer Vehicle Excise Duty - money raised by taxation to pay for new road construction and for repair of damage done to existing roads by the growing number of motorists. As the Board needed to work out which roads should be funded, upgraded or replaced, its secretary, William Rees Jeffreys, appointed Henry Maybury, one of the Board's senior engineers, to devise a classification system and then assign numbers to the highways for identification purposes. The work was interrupted by the First World War. It did not resume until the Ministry of Transport was formed in 1919 and given authority to classify highways and to allocate funding for road maintenance, authority for which was granted by section 17 (2) of the Ministry of Transport Act 1919. A classification system was created in 1922, under which important routes connecting large population centres, or for through traffic, were designated as Class I, and roads of lesser importance were designated as Class II. The definitive list of those roads was published on 1 April 1923, following consultations with local authorities. Government funding towards the repairs of these roads were set at 60% for the former and 50% for the latter.

Shortly after this, the numbers started to appear in road atlases and on signs on the roads themselves, making them a tool for motorists in addition to their use for determining funding. The numbers of the roads changed quite frequently during the early years of the system, because it was a period of rapid expansion of the network and some numbered routes did not follow the most usual routes taken. The Trunk Roads Act 1936 gave the Ministry direct control of major routes and a new classification system was created to identify these routes. Originally, those numbers beginning with "T" were to be made public, but that was eventually deemed unnecessary.

With the introduction of motorways in the late 1950s, a new classification of "M" was introduced. In many cases the motorways duplicated existing stretches of A road, which therefore lost much of their significance and were in some cases renumbered. There was no consistent approach to the renumbering – some A roads retained their existing number as non-primary roads (e.g. the A40 running alongside the M40), others were given "less significant" numbers (e.g. the A34 in Warwickshire became the A3400 after the M40 was built), and the remainder were downgraded to B or unclassified roads (e.g. the A38, which was replaced by the M5 between Tiverton and Exeter). Occasionally, the new motorway would take the name of the old A road rather than having its own number. The most notable example of that is the A1(M).

== Zoning system ==
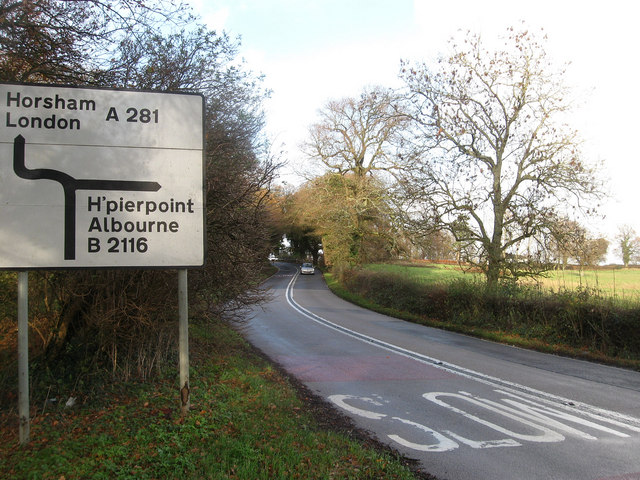
A sign at Crouch Hill near Henfield, West Sussex, showing two road numbers in Zone 2.

=== Non-motorway ===
In England and Wales the road numbering system for all-purpose (i.e. non-motorway) roads is based on a radial pattern centred on London. In Scotland the same scheme is centred on Edinburgh. In both cases the main single-digit roads normally define the zone boundaries. The exception is between Zones 1 and 2, where the River Thames defines the boundary so that all of Kent is in Zone 2.

- Zone 1: North of the Thames, east of the A1 covering much of North London, Essex, Cambridgeshire, East Anglia, Lincolnshire, parts of Yorkshire, County Durham, Tyne and Wear, Northumberland, parts of the Scottish Borders, East Lothian and on up to Edinburgh
- Zone 2: South of the Thames, east of the A3 covering most of South London, part of Surrey, Sussex and Kent
- Zone 3: North/West of the A3, south of the A4 covering part of Surrey, Hampshire (excluding Portsmouth), the Isle of Wight and South West England
- Zone 4: North of the A4, south/west of the A5 covering the south and West Midlands, Oxfordshire, Bristol, Gloucestershire, Buckinghamshire and south, west and Mid Wales.
- Zone 5: North/East of the A5, west of the A6, south of the Solway Firth/Eden Estuary covering North Wales, North Midlands, western Leicestershire, Cheshire, Cumbria and western Lancashire. In Central London, the A40 (Holborn Viaduct, Holborn, High Holborn and Oxford Street) provides a border between the 4 and 5 zones east of Marble Arch. The original A5 (now renumbered A5183) also provides such a border, and north of St Albans the original A6 (now renumbered A1081) provides an Eastern border.
- Zone 6: East of the A6 and A7, west of the A1 covering eastern Lancashire, North East England, Yorkshire, Nottinghamshire, eastern Leicestershire and Rutland, and the Scottish Borders and Lothians. Between St Albans and Luton, the original A6 (now renumbered A1081) provides the Western border of the 6-zone.
- Zone 7: North of the Solway Firth/Eden Estuary, west of the A7, south of the A8 covering Dumfries and Galloway, Ayrshire and Central Scotland, including Glasgow south of the Clyde.
- Zone 8: North of the A8, west of the A9 covering northern Glasgow, Argyll and Bute, Highland and the Western Isles
- Zone 9: North of the A8, east of the A9 covering Fife, North East Scotland, Orkney and Shetland

The first digit in the number of any road should be the number of the furthest-anticlockwise zone entered by that road. For example, the A38 road, a trunk road running from Bodmin to Mansfield starts in Zone 3, and is therefore numbered with an A3x number, even though it passes through Zones 4 and 5 to end in Zone 6. Additionally, the A1 in Newcastle upon Tyne has moved twice. Originally along the Great North Road, it then moved to the Tyne Tunnel, causing some of the roads in Zone 1 to lie in Zone 6. The designated A1 later moved to the western bypass around the city, and roads between the two found themselves back in Zone 1. For the most part the roads affected retained their original numbers throughout.

Elsewhere when single-digit roads were bypassed, roads were often re-numbered in keeping with the original zone boundaries.

A few roads are anomalously numbered.

=== Motorways ===
Motorway number zones of England and Wales

Motorways first came to Britain over three decades after the advent of the A-road numbering event, and as a result required a new numbering system. They were given an M prefix, and in England and Wales a numbering system of their own not coterminous with that of the A-road network, though based on the same principle of zones. Running clockwise from the M1 the zones were defined for Zones 1 to 4 based on the proposed M2, M3 and M4 motorways. The M5 and M6 numbers were reserved for the other two planned long distance motorways. The Preston Bypass, the UK's first motorway section, should have been numbered A6(M) under the scheme decided upon, but it was decided to keep the number M6 as had already been applied. The first full-length motorway in the UK was the M1 motorway.

Shorter motorways typically take their numbers from a parent motorway in contravention of the zone system, explaining the apparently anomalous numbers of the M48 and M49 motorways as spurs of the M4, and M271 and M275 motorways as those of the M27. This numbering system was devised in 1958–59 by the then Ministry of Transport and Civil Aviation, and applied only in England and Wales. It was decided to reserve the numbers 7, 8 & 9 for Scotland. In Scotland, where roads were the responsibility of the Scottish Office (Scottish Government after 1999), the decision was taken to adopt a scheme whereby motorways took the numbers of the all-purpose routes they replaced. As a result, there is no M7 (as no motorway follows the A7), and when the A90 was re-routed to replace the A85 south of Perth, the short M85 became part of the M90.

== A roads ==
=== Single-digit A roads ===
In England and Wales, the six single-digit numbers reflect the traditionally most important radial routes coming out of London, Starting with the A1 which heads due north, numbers were allocated sequentially in a clockwise direction, thus:

- A1 London to Edinburgh (also known as the Great North Road). The southern half of the road is bypassed by the M1 and many sections have been upgraded to A1(M).
- A2 London to Dover (the southern part of Watling Street, also known as the Dover Road).
- A3 London to Portsmouth (also known as the Portsmouth Road).
- A4 London to Avonmouth (also known as the Great West Road or the Bath Road), although this route is not used as a long-distance road since the completion of the M4.
- A5 London to Holyhead (the Northern part of Watling Street). Much of the southern part is bypassed by the M1 and M6.
- A6 Luton to Carlisle (The A6 originally started in Barnet on the old A1. When the A1 was moved onto the Barnet Bypass in the 1950s, the A6 was cut back to the A1/A1(M) junction (later A1/M25 junction). Further renumbering in the St Albans area means that it now starts in Luton town centre. The old route is numbered as A1081). The northern part is paralleled by the M6.

Similarly, in Scotland, important roads radiating from Edinburgh have single-digit numbers, thus:

- A7 Edinburgh to Carlisle, although the M74 and M8 motorways now form the primary link.
- A8 Edinburgh to Greenock, which formerly linked Edinburgh to Glasgow, now has a 25-mile (40 km) gap, where it is replaced by the M8.
- A9 Falkirk to Scrabster. Originally Edinburgh to Inverness, the A9 was extended to John o' Groats via Wick on 16 May 1935, and later cut back at the southern end because of the construction of the main runway at Edinburgh Airport on top of it. As such, the route from Edinburgh is now replaced by the M9 (with the M90 across the Queensferry Crossing as an alternative to Perth). On 1 April 1997, the A9 was diverted to Thurso and Scrabster at the northern end.

While these routes remain the basis for the numbering of the A road network, they are no longer necessarily major roads, having been bypassed by motorways or other changes to the road network.

=== Other A roads ===
These radials are supplemented by two-digit codes which are routes that may be slightly less important, but may still be classified as trunk routes, although many of these routes have lost a lot of their significance due to motorway bypasses, or the upgrading of other A-roads (such as the A38 (M)). These routes are not all centred on London, but as far as possible follow the general principle that their number locates them radially clockwise from the associated single digit route. For example, the A10 (London to King's Lynn) is the first main route clockwise from the A1, the A11 (London to Norwich) is the next, then the A12 (London to Lowestoft) and the A13 (London to Shoeburyness); the next radial is the A2, followed by the A20 (London to Dover), and so on. These roads have been numbered either outwards from or clockwise around their respective hubs, depending on their alignment.

The system continues to three and four digit numbers which further split and criss-cross the radials. Lower numbers originate closer to London than higher numbered ones. As roads have been improved since the scheme commenced, some roads with 3 or 4 digit numbers have increased in significance, for example the A127, A1079 and A414. New routes have also been allocated 3 or 4 digit numbers, for example the Edinburgh City Bypass is the A720.

The Major Road Network is a proposed classification of major local-authority controlled A roads that the government committed to implementing in 2017, with the aim of better targeting road funding.

=== Lists of A roads ===
- Zone 1 A roads
- Zone 2 A roads
- Zone 3 A roads
- Zone 4 A roads
- Zone 5 A roads
- Zone 6 A roads
- Zone 7 A roads
- Zone 8 A roads
- Zone 9 A roads

=== Trunk roads and primary routes ===
Some A roads are designated trunk roads, which implies that central government rather than local government has responsibility for them. A more recent classification is that of primary routes, the category of recommended routes for long-distance traffic. Primary routes include both trunk and non-trunk roads.

=== Motorway sections ===
Some sections of A roads have been improved to the same standard as motorways, but do not completely replace the existing road; they form a higher standard part of the route for those which are not excluded. These sections retain the same number but are suffixed with (M), for example the A1(M) and A404(M). There have been occasions where this designation has been used to indicate motorway bypasses of an existing road, but the original retains the A road designation, for example A3(M), A329(M), A38(M), A48(M) and A627(M).

== B roads ==
B roads are numbered distributor roads, which have lower traffic densities than the main trunk roads, or A roads. This classification has nothing to do with the width or quality of the physical road, and B roads can range from dual carriageways to single track roads with passing places. B roads follow the same numbering scheme as A roads, but almost always have 3- and 4-digit designations. Many 3-digit B roads outside the London area are former A roads which have been downgraded owing to new road construction; others may link smaller settlements to A roads.

=== Lists of B roads ===
- Zone 1 B roads
- Zone 2 B roads
- Zone 3 B roads
- Zone 4 B roads
- Zone 5 B roads
- Zone 6 B roads
- Zone 7 B roads
- Zone 8 B roads
- Zone 9 B roads

== Other classifications ==
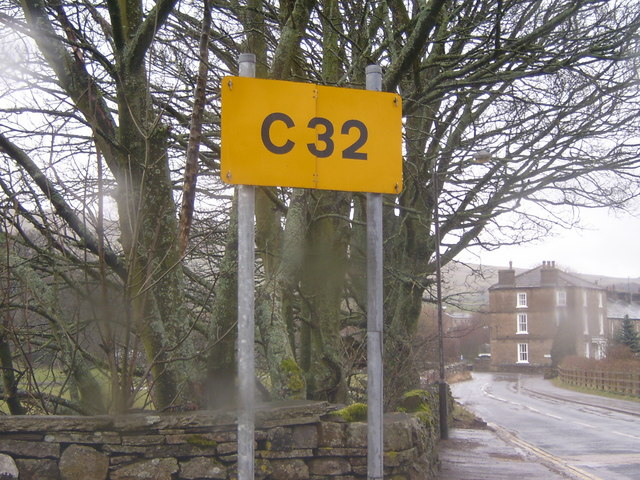
C road sign in Ribblesdale, North Yorkshire

=== Unclassified roads ===
Roads and lanes with yet lower traffic densities are designated as unclassified roads commonly using C, D and U prefixes but, while these are numbered, in general this is done for use by the local authorities who are responsible for maintaining them and the non-unique numbering is in a local series which usually does not appear on road signs; use of local numbers on signs in England is "not advised". Exceptions to this are known in the forms of numbers on signs and past use of prefixes H and V on signs in Milton Keynes where main roads have a regular grid system. These designations are used when planning officers deal with certain planning applications, including the creation of a new vehicular access onto a highway. The letter Q was formerly used for many important unclassified roads in Fife, but these have now been renumbered as U roads.

==== Colour codes in Devon ====
Minor roads in the county of Devon have further sub-classifications according to their accessibility. This is due to the rural nature of Devon's topography making some roads unsuitable for certain types of vehicle.

The classification is denoted by the colour of the sign border and direction arrow, and can be summarised as follows:

- Blue - roads suitable for cars, minibuses and light goods vehicles excluding caravans
- Brown - roads that are only suitable for cars and other light traffic
- White - roads recommended for local traffic only

=== Cycleways ===
In London, Cycleways are using the C prefix and marked using pale green signs. There are also some CS prefixes taken after the original name Cycle Superhighways, marked using magenta signs, but these are being phased out.

=== E-roads ===
Despite numerous large roads in Great Britain being part of the International E-road network, no road that forms part of this network is signposted as such and only the road's national designation is shown. The same is true in Northern Ireland.
