= Awkley =

Hamlet in Gloucestershire, England

Coordinates: 51.5697°N 2.5866°W

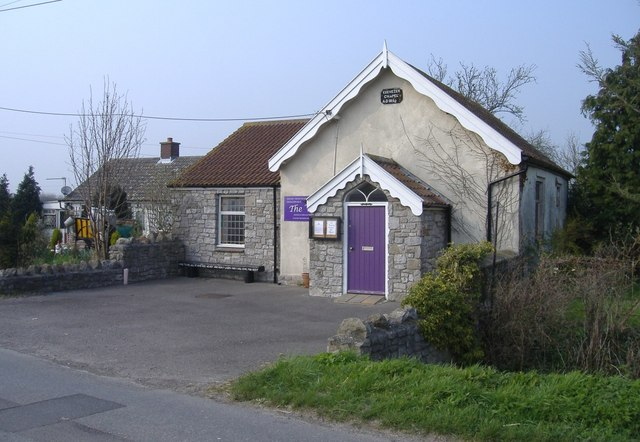
- The Vine, Awkley

- Location within Gloucestershire
- Civil parish: Olveston
- District: South Gloucestershire
- Shire county: Gloucestershire
- Region: South West
- Country: England
- Sovereign state: United Kingdom
- Post town: Bristol
- Postcode district: BS35
- Police: Avon and Somerset
- Fire: Avon
- Ambulance: South Western
- UK Parliament: Thornbury and Yate

Awkley is a hamlet in the parish of Olveston in South Gloucestershire, England. It lies just off the M4 and M48 junctions. Several streams run in the area including Tockington Mill Rhine, Moor Rhine, Niatt Rhine and Sandy Rhine. One notable building at Awkley is the former Ebenezer chapel, dated to 1850. Now known as "The Vine", it reopened for worship in August 2006.

A will dated 1632 showed that the hamlet (known as "Awklers"), was owned by a William Tovy, who held it in socage from the manor of Tockington. He left it to his son and heir, Edward Tovy.
