= Magor services =

Motorway service station in Monmouthshire, Wales

Magor Services
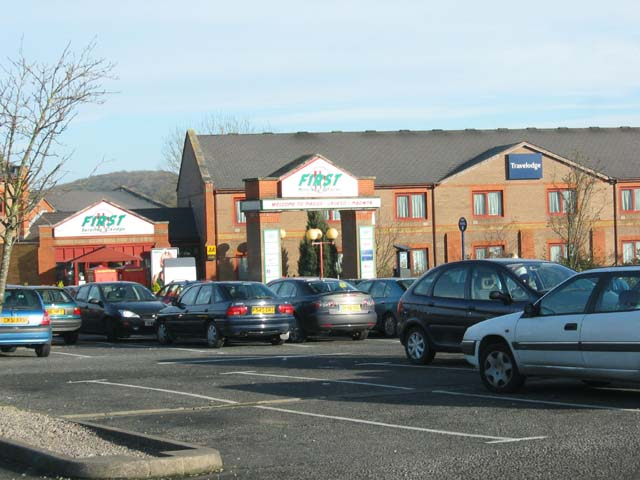

Information
- County: Monmouthshire
- Road: M4 (also accessible to traffic on the B4245)
- Coordinates: 51.5879°N 2.8371°W
- Operator: Roadchef
- Previous operators: Granada, First
- Date opened: 1996
- Website: www.roadchef.com/locations/magor

Magor services (Welsh: Gwasanaethau Magwyr) is a motorway service station on the M4, located just off junction 23A, at Magor near Newport, in Monmouthshire, South Wales.

== History ==
The services opened in 1996 along with the Second Severn Crossing and was first operated by the Granada group. Subsequently managed by First, the services became dilapidated and lacking in facilities and in April 2007 were voted the worst in Britain by members of Vans United. In August 2011, it was announced that Magor services had been sold to Roadchef.

Next eastbound: Leigh Delamere; Severn View (M48)	Motorway service stations on the M4 motorway	Next westbound: Cardiff Gate
