= Severn View services =

Motorway service station near Bristol, England

Severn View Services
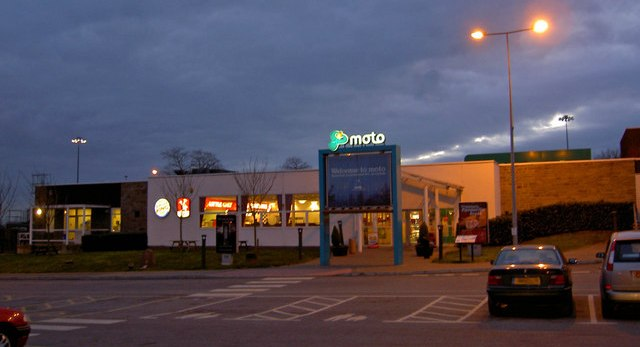
- The main building

- Location within Gloucestershire

Information
- County: Gloucestershire
- Road: M4 (1966-1996); M48 (1996-present)
- Coordinates: 51.6032°N 2.6197°W
- Operator: Moto Hospitality
- Previous name: Aust
- Date opened: 9 September 1966
- Website: moto-way.com/services/severn-view/

Severn View services, formerly Aust services is a motorway service station on the M48 motorway near the village of Aust, northwest of Bristol, in South West England. It is owned by Moto.

== History ==
=== Old building ===
The service was constructed by Higgs and Hill Ltd as part of the M4 motorway contract between Aust and Almondsbury. The original services building was built near the edge of the cliff, allowing visitors to see the Severn Bridge and the Severn Estuary.

The services went into operation the day after the bridge and motorway were opened on 8 September 1966, with Elizabeth II visiting. The services were originally run by Top Rank Motorport, a subsidiary of The Rank Organisation. The site was 25 acres and had a 350 seat restaurant, a self service cafeteria for 450 people, a transport cafe and parking for 750 cars and lorries. A 1978 government report stated that this service station had the largest public cafeteria in the United Kingdom.

When the road was diverted over the Second Severn Crossing it was expected that these services would close. The original building was closed and sold, and operations moved to an petrol station part of the site.

=== New building ===
It has been owned by Moto Hospitality since the company was founded in 2001, making it one of the first motorway services to be operated by Moto. Burger King is the only surviving brand that has been operating there since 2001.

Despite Moto's take over, the mini amusement arcade in the services, Gscape, remained there from the days when Granada owned the service station despite being Granada branded, as Granada created the 'Gscape' arcades to appear exclusively within their services, with the "G" in the logo being the same G that Granada had in their logo. The 'Gscape' branding was removed in the 2010s.

A sign located beside the A403 road some distance before approaching the roundabout that serves the service station has generated some interest. The sign, depicting a pictograph symbol of a bed, is supposed to identify that the service station has a hotel, although the sign appears some distance outside the service station and gives no direction to get there. It was erected when Granada bought the service station, and the same sign is normally seen in other service stations once owned by Granada, inside the service station's entrance.

The 2019 Motorway Services User Survey found that Severn View had the lowest level of customer satisfaction of motorway services in the UK.

== Incidents ==
The services have been linked to several suicides, as drivers can abandon cars in the car park and walk out onto the bridge or the cliff face with minimal supervision. The Manic Street Preachers guitarist Richey Edwards' car was reported as abandoned in the service station car park on 17 February 1995. He had been missing since checking out of a hotel in Bayswater, London on 1 February. His whereabouts remain unknown, but in 2008 he was legally declared to be presumed dead.

Next eastbound: None on M48; Leigh Delamere (M4)	Motorway service stations on the M48 motorway	Next westbound: None on M48; Magor (M4)
