= Leigh Delamere services =

Motorway service area in Wiltshire, England

Leigh Delamere Services
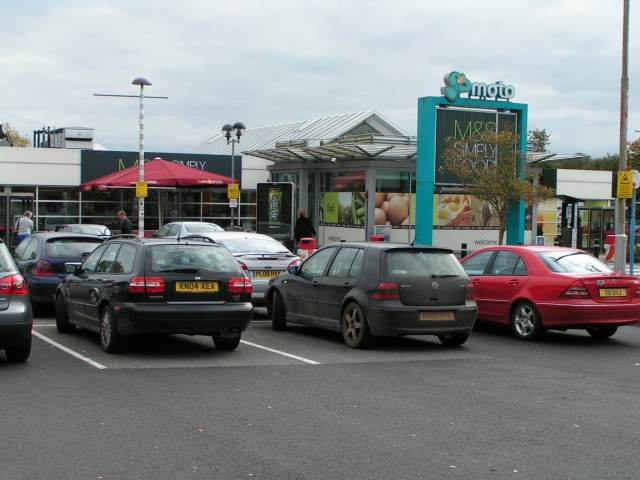
- The eastbound services in 2008

- Location within Wiltshire

Information
- County: Wiltshire
- Road: M4
- Coordinates: 51.5115°N 2.1595°W
- Operator: Moto Hospitality
- Date opened: 3 February 1972
- Website: moto-way.com/services/leigh-delamere-westbound

Leigh Delamere services is a motorway service area on the M4 motorway in England, one mile west of Junction 17, between Bristol and Swindon (close to Chippenham and Malmesbury). It takes its name from the adjoining village of Leigh Delamere. It is one of Europe's largest service stations. The service area is owned by Moto Hospitality.

== History ==
It was planned to open in January or February 1972, run by Esso Tavernas; other sites of Esso were Birch Services, Washington services, Woolley Edge services, and Southwaite Services. The 43-acre (17 ha) site cost £650,000. In January 1971 a £400,000 contract was given to Sir Alfred McAlpine & Sons.

It opened at 9am on Monday 3 February 1972, with the largest petrol station in the UK. For the first eight weeks, the site only served petrol. At opening, it had 188 restaurant seats and 60 cafeteria seats. In early 1974, the site was improved by Granada.

== In popular culture ==
The station is mentioned in The Eyre Affair by Jasper Fforde and is supposedly named after the mother of an associate of the main villain. It was the proposed meeting point for Marion and Keith (Rob Brydon) in Series 2 Episode 1 - The Services - of the comedy Marion and Geoff and features several times in the BBC sitcom Gavin & Stacey, although scenes purportedly at Leigh Delamere were filmed at Cardiff Gate services in Wales.

Leigh Delamere is mentioned in Flying Dutch (1991) by Tom Holt. In chapter 10 he describes it as follows:

"Leigh Delamere service station is unquestionably the Xanadu of the M4. Bring us, it seems to say, your weary and oppressed, your travel-sick children, your knackered and your bored stiff, and we will make them a strong cup of tea and a plate of scrambled eggs. If only it had a cinema and some rudimentary form of democratic government, no-one with any sense would ever want to leave."

Next eastbound: Membury	Motorway service stations on the M4 motorway	Next westbound: Magor; Severn View (M48)
