= M4 motorway Usk bridge =

Bridge in Newport, Wales

Coordinates: 51.60434°N 2.99073°W

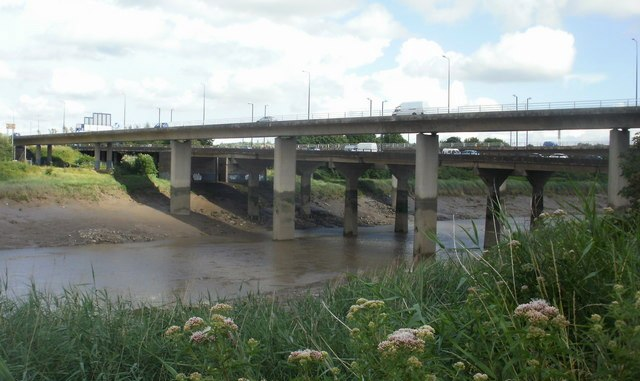
The M4 motorway Usk bridge, with a slip road from the A4042 in the foreground

The M4 motorway Usk bridge carries the M4 motorway across the River Usk in the city of Newport, Wales.

The bridge comprises two separate 450-foot (140 m) structures, for the eastbound and westbound carriageways. It is of reinforced concrete with five spans. An article in the New Civil Engineer published in June 2017 described it as "one of the most important bridges in Wales". When travelling westbound, the bridges lead directly into the twin 1,200-foot-long (370 m) Brynglas Tunnels. Work commenced on both the bridge and the tunnels on 10 September 1962, two months after work commenced on the George Street Bridge further downstream. The entire Newport bypass section of the M4 (junctions 24 to 28) finally opened in 1967.

In 1989, two crossings were added to connect the M4 with the newly constructed junction 25a and the A4042.

In 2017 the bridge underwent repairs to its thrust hinge joints, which allow the deck to flex and bend, but remained open to traffic.
