= Swansea services =

Motorway service area in Wales

Swansea Services
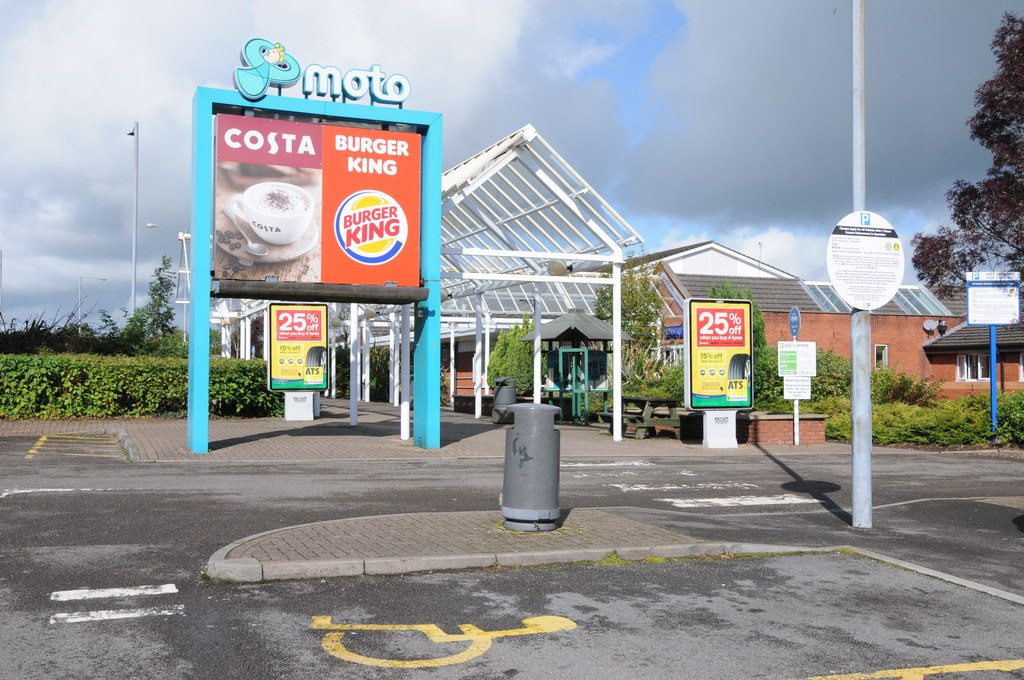

- Location within Swansea

Information
- County: Swansea
- Road: M4
- Coordinates: 51.6782°N 3.9946°W
- Operator: Moto Hospitality
- Date opened: 5 August 1991
- Website: moto-way.com/services/swansea/

Swansea services (Welsh: Gwasanaethau Gorllewin Abertawe, "Swansea West services") is a motorway service station on the M4 motorway at junction 47 near Penllergaer, Swansea, Wales. It is owned by Moto and features BP gas station. Amenities include, Burger King, Costa Coffee & Express, Greggs, WHSmith, with accommodations by Travelodge and Full House. It was opened on 5 August 1991 and at the time it has a Texaco petrol station and 50-bed Rank Motor Lodge.

Next eastbound: Sarn Park	Motorway service stations on the M4 motorway	Next westbound: Pont Abraham
