= Pont Abraham Services =

Motorway service area in Carmarthenshire, Wales

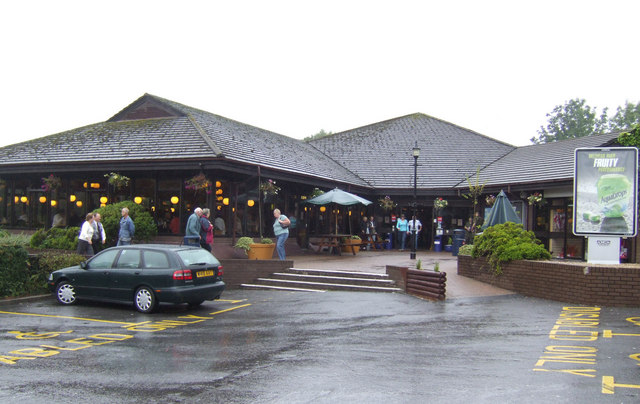
- The main building from the upper car park.

- Location in southwest Wales

Information
- County: Carmarthenshire
- Road: M4
- Coordinates: 51°44′51″N 4°03′57″W
- Operator: RoadChef
- Website: www.roadchef.com/motorway-services/pont-abraham

Pont Abraham Services is a Motorway service area in Carmarthenshire, Wales, near Pontarddulais at the western end of the M4 motorway at junction 49, where the motorway meets the A48 and A483 on a roundabout. It has come under regular criticism for high fuel costs.

== Location ==
The services are at a roundabout at the end of the M4, where the A48 (and later the A40) takes over the main traffic route to West Wales. It can be accessed from any direction the vehicles are travelling.

== History ==
The location of the services was originally a bridge over the River Gwili on what later became the A48, and was known as Gwili Bridge.

The services were first proposed in 1975, while the M4 bypass of Pontarddulais was under construction. They were opened by the Parliamentary Under-Secretary of State for Wales, John Stradling Thomas on 17 June 1983. The following year, Stradling Thomas was also asked if there would be further picnic areas provided on the M4, as there were at Pont Abraham, but replied that it was a matter for the private sector.

== Fuel ==
The services have been regularly criticised on review websites such as TripAdvisor. One such review said the facilities were "about as much fun as telling the kids the dog's been put to sleep". A common complaint is high fuel prices. This may be because motorists think it is the last place they could easily find to refuel a vehicle, though there are other nearby petrol stations, such as one on the A48 at Cross Hands four miles away.

In 2005, the price of diesel reached 99p per litre, which invited comparisons with sunflower oil generated biodiesel which a local driver said could cost half the price. In 2022, the services were one of the first in the country to reach £2 per litre, when it was charging 202.9p for unleaded petrol. It has also being criticised for its high prices to recharge electric vehicles.

In 2023, a poll found that Pont Abraham was the second worst service area in the UK, just above Bothwell services.

== Employee scandal ==
The services had a long-running share ownership scheme, provided by RoadChef. In 2014, former employees at the services won a court case after shares they owned in a company scheme were transferred. However, a full payout was never made.

Next eastbound: Swansea	Motorway service stations on the M4 motorway	Next westbound: None
