= Sarn Park services =

Motorway service area in Wales

Sarn Park Services
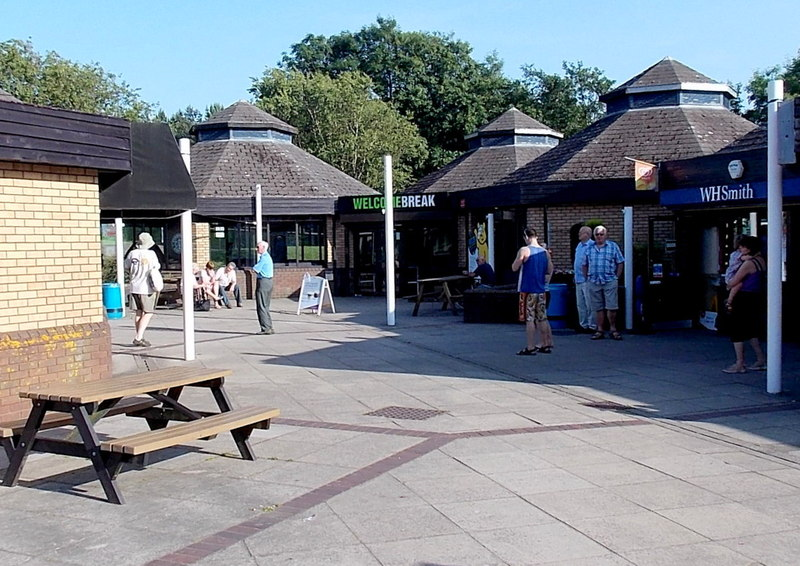
- Sarn Park Services in 2013

- Location within Bridgend

Information
- County: Bridgend County Borough
- Road: M4
- Coordinates: 51.5345°N 3.5769°W
- Operator: Welcome Break
- Date opened: 1986
- Website: welcomebreak.co.uk/locations/sarn-park/

Sarn Park services (Welsh: Gwasanaethau Parc Sarn) is a motorway service station on the M4 motorway in Bridgend County Borough, Wales. It is situated at junction 36 of the motorway, north of the town of Bridgend, and is owned by Welcome Break. Bridgend Designer Outlet is on the opposite side of the motorway.

The service station has a Burger King restaurant, a Starbucks coffeehouse and a WHSmith bookshop, as well as a Days Inn hotel.

Next eastbound: Cardiff West	Motorway service stations on the M4 motorway	Next westbound: Swansea
