= M49 motorway =

Motorway in England

M49
- M49 highlighted in blue
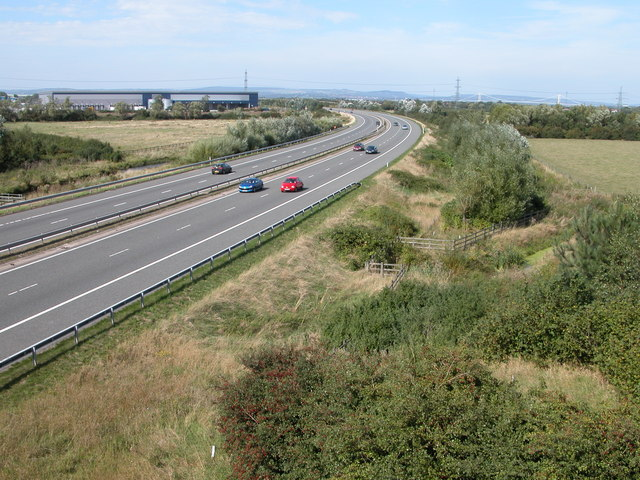
- Looking north towards the Second Severn Crossing, 2006

Route information
- Maintained by National Highways
- Length: 5.0 mi (8.0 km)
- Existed: 1996–present

Major junctions
- Northwest end: Redwick
- M4 motorway M5 motorway
- Southeast end: Lawrence Weston

Location
- Country: United Kingdom

Road network
- Roads in the United Kingdom; Motorways; A and B road zones
← M48	→ M50

The M49 is a dual two lane motorway in England that links the M4 (J22) with the M5 (J18A). The southern end is on the outskirts of Avonmouth and the northern end is immediately to the east of the Prince of Wales Bridge which was constructed at the same time 1996. It is 5 miles (8 km) long.

== Route ==
The M49 begins at junction 18A of the M5 and then heads roughly north and northwest before it reaches its terminal junction with the M4 at junction 22, just before the Second Severn Crossing at Pilning Interchange. It cuts journey times for traffic to and from Avonmouth docks, Central and southern Bristol and South West England.

Compared to driving via the M4/M5 interchange, using the M49 cuts the distance travelled by 6.2 miles. Having a two-way grade separated roundabout junction with the M4, it also fulfils the additional role of providing a bypass for the busy stretch of the M5 between the Avonmouth Bridge and the M4 in case of that route being shut.

Original plans provided for an intermediate junction with the A403, to serve an expanded industrial area and Severn Beach. Construction of Junction 1 commenced summer 2018 and was completed late in August 2020. Despite this, the junction is not currently connected to the local road network, so cannot be used to access the motorway.

The M49 is anomalously numbered, as it is entirely to the south of the M4 and should therefore begin with a 3.

== Junction 1 link road dispute ==
After the junction itself was completed in August 2020, disputes arose over who should construct the road linking the new Junction 1 to the local road network. The dispute initially emerged between Highways England, South Gloucestershire Council, and the development company Delta Properties, as a result of privately owned land on the development which surrounds the junction.

In February 2021, the West of England Combined Authority agreed to supply £1 million towards the construction of the link road, but by May a further deficit of £1 million had arisen. Land required to complete the junction was in parcels as small as two square metres, which a South Gloucestershire councillor called "ransom strips" to increase the land price. In February 2023, the council authorised compulsory purchase orders for the land purchase, with National Highways providing an additional £7 million for the council to buy the land.

== Junctions ==
Data from driver location signs are used to provide distance and carriageway identifier information.

M49 motorway junctions
miles	km	North-west bound exits (B carriageway)	Junction	South-east bound exits (A carriageway)
0.0	0.0	London, Bath, Bristol, The Midlands M4(E)	M4 J22 terminus	The South West, Avonmouth, Bristol Airport, Weston-super-Mare M49
0.0	0.0	South Wales, Cardiff, Newport M4(W)	M4 J22 terminus	Start of motorway
5.3	8.5	Start of motorway	Terminus; A4, M5; J18 & J18A	Avonmouth, Bristol, Airport A4
5.3	8.5	South Wales, Cardiff, Newport (M4(W)) M49	Terminus; A4, M5; J18 & J18A	The South West, Weston-s-Mare, M5
Notes: Distances in kilometres and carriageway identifiers are obtained from driver location signs/location marker posts. Where a junction spans several hundred metres and the data is available, both the start and finish values for the junction are shown.; Junction 1 construction is complete, but not yet connected to the local road network.
1.000 mi = 1.609 km; 1.000 km = 0.621 mi

Information above gathered from Advanced Direction Signs May 2011

== See also ==
- List of motorways in the United Kingdom
