= George Street Bridge, Newport =

George Street Bridge
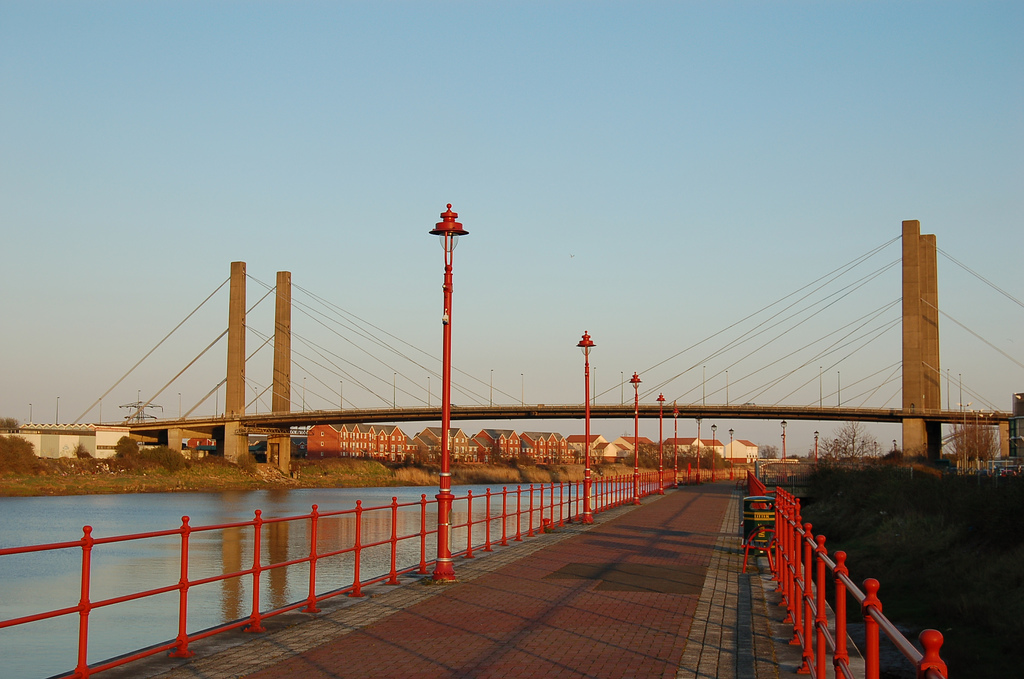
- George Street Bridge as seen from the promenade at Powell's Town Wharf on the west bank
- Coordinates: 51.5842°N 2.9844°W
- Carries: Motor vehicles, cyclists and pedestrians
- Crosses: River Usk
- Locale: Newport
- Official name: George Street Bridge
- Maintained by: Newport City Council

Characteristics
- Design: Cable-stayed bridge
- Width: Four-lane carriageway, two cycle/footpaths (total 84 feet / 25½ metres)
- Height: 171 feet (52 metres)
- Longest span: 500 feet (150 metres)

History
- Constructed by: Mott, Hay & Anderson
- Construction start: 1962
- Opened: 9 April 1964

Location
- Interactive map of George Street Bridge

George Street Bridge is a crossing of the River Usk in the community of Victoria in Newport, South Wales. It is a Grade II* listed structure.

== Planning ==
Originally the bridge was planned to be six lanes wide, but with the M4 motorway Usk bridge already planned further upstream it was reduced to four lanes.

== Opening ==
It was opened on 9 April 1964 and is the first cable-stayed cantilever bridge in the United Kingdom. It is a Grade II* listed structure.

Before its opening in 1964 the only road crossings of the river Usk in central Newport were the Newport Bridge carrying the main A48 road and Newport Transporter Bridge.

Many grand names were proposed for the bridge but it was eventually named after the relatively small George Street on the western bank of the River Usk.

== Continuing developments ==
On completion, the A48 route was diverted over the new bridge, making it the preferred route for through traffic. However, in 2004 the new City Bridge on the Southern Distributor Road further downstream became the preferred route and assumed the route number.

== See also ==
- List of bridges in Wales
