= Brynglas Tunnels =

Road tunnels in Wales

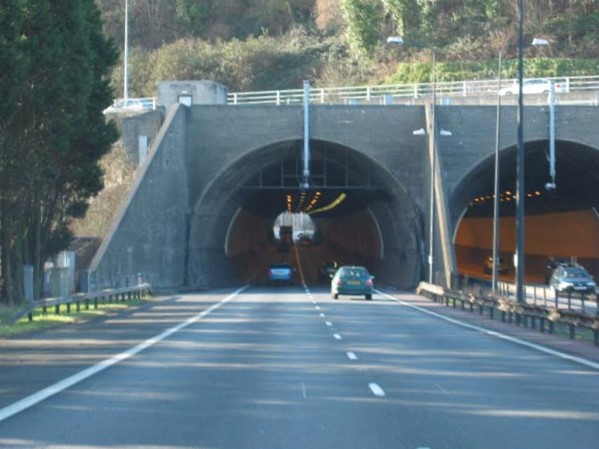
- The eastern portal: entrance to west bound tunnel on left, exit of east bound tunnel on right
- Interactive map of Brynglas Tunnels

Overview
- Location: Newport, Wales
- Coordinates: 51.60325°N 2.99739°W
- Route: M4

Operation
- Work began: 10 September 1962
- Opened: May 1967

Technical
- Length: 360 metres (390 yd)
- No. of lanes: 2 each way
- Operating speed: Variable

The Brynglas Tunnels carry the M4 under Brynglas Hill in Newport, Wales. The 360-metre-long (390 yd) tunnels are the first and only twin–bored tunnels in the UK motorway network. (Note: The twin-bore Dartford Tunnel is not classified as a motorway, although it is part of the M25 route.)

The tunnels and adjacent M4 motorway Usk bridge were originally planned by Newport Corporation in August 1959 in a plan submitted to the Ministry of Transport. Work started on the £3m tunnels project - led by engineer Sir Owen Williams on 10 September 1962. Both structures were complete and open to traffic on 5 May 1967. During the construction several houses on Brynglas Road (where the modern Newport Lodge Hotel now stands) had to be demolished due to structural weaknesses caused by the tunnelling and prompting questions in the House of Commons.

== Traffic congestion ==
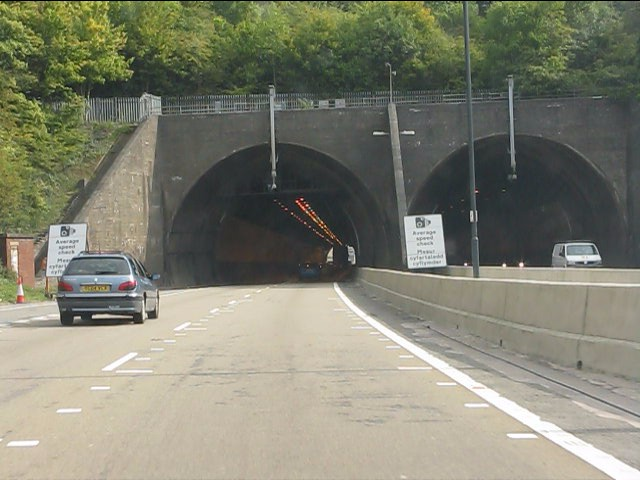
The western portals

Almost as soon as the M4 Newport bypass (junctions 24-28) had opened, the traffic levels had grown to such a degree that the road had to be widened to three lanes in each direction. This was finished in 1982 but with the exception of the tunnels and Usk bridge which remained as dual two-lane sections (Junctions 25-26). M4 sliproads at Junction 25 (Caerleon Road) are diverted to reduce traffic through the tunnels. M4 Westbound traffic joining at Junction 25 is diverted via Junction 25A/A4042 (Heidenheim Drive)/A4051 (Malpas Road) to Junction 26. Similarly eastbound traffic wishing to exit at Junction 25 is diverted from Junction 26 via the A4051/A4042/Junction 25A. This adds to congestion on Malpas Road and other local roads near Newport city centre at peak times.

The tunnels remain a bottleneck on the motorway. Partly due to regular tailbacks at the tunnels, a variable speed limit is in place between junctions 24 and 28.

A new M4 relief road south of Newport was proposed, but on 15 July 2009 the scheme was dropped by the National Assembly for Wales. The A48 Southern Distributor Road, a two-lane dual carriageway connecting M4 junction 24 to junction 28, remains the alternative route. In March 2012 the National Assembly for Wales published options for consultation including the option to bore further tunnels.

== Fire ==
On 26 July 2011, a lorry fire caused both tunnels to be completely closed.

The articulated lorry caught fire upon entering the west-bound tunnel entrance. Due to the nature of the damage to the lorry it was unable to exit the tunnel. Attempts by the driver to disconnect the cargo-section from the lorry cab failed. As the fire intensified tyres on the vehicle started to explode and the lorry driver was driven to safety by a motorist who had stopped further back towards the entrance of the tunnel to block and prevent vehicles behind from entering the smoke-filled tunnel. There were no fatalities recorded but the closure caused a considerable amount of traffic delay in both directions of travel.
