= A403 road =

Road in South West England

Coordinates: 51.55237°N 2.66547°W

A403

Route information
- Length: 8.4 mi (13.5 km)

Major junctions
- Northeast end: M48 Junction 1, Aust Interchange
- M48; A4
- Southwest end: A4 Crowley Way in Avonmouth, near M5 Junction 18

Location
- Country: United Kingdom
- Constituent country: England

Road network
- Roads in the United Kingdom; Motorways; A and B road zones

The A403 is a main road linking Bristol with the Severn Estuary. It runs from junction 1 of the M48 at Aust to the docks at Avonmouth. After the Severn Bridge was opened in 1966, the A403 was constructed in 1969 and 1970 to provide a direct route between the M4 motorway and Avonmouth. It is an important route for the local industries, allowing easy access between Wales and this part of England. It was financed by Gloucestershire County Council with a £387,000 grant from the Ministry of Transport and was initially known as the Avonmouth Aust Coast Road.

== Route ==
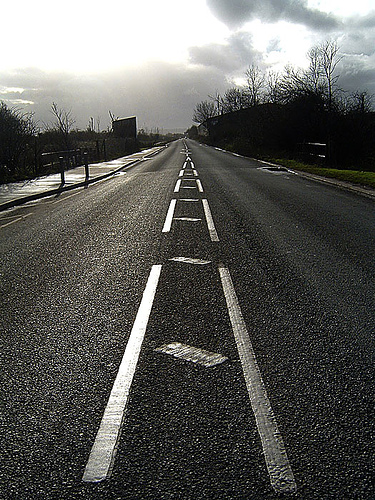
A403 at Avonmouth

The road is 8 1/2 miles (13.7 km) running through South Gloucestershire and the City of Bristol. Between the M4 at Aust and Pilning it replaced the B4055 on a realigned route. Between Pilning and Chittening it followed a new route beside the ICI Severnside plant, and from Chittening to Avonmouth it followed the route of an existing unclassified road, St Andrews Road. At Avonmouth it connects with the A4, leading to the Portway. The road disrupted local communities, with Pilning being split in two sections. It runs near the proposed Avonmouth and Severnside Enterprise Area, planned for expansion by Bristol City Council. When completed, the road will have a junction with the M49 motorway (Junction 1) reducing the amount of heavy traffic passing through local communities.

== Safety ==
Around 8,000 vehicles a day use this road. Although this is relatively low, a high proportion of traffic consists of heavy goods vehicles (HGVs); over five times the average. The A403 has had a poor safety record with numerous accidents. A particular problem has been HGVs parked at laybys along the road obscuring the view ahead, leading to several fatalities. South Gloucestershire Council reduced the speed limit on their section to 50 mph in 2007. Bristol City Council have announced plans to install better facilities for cyclists along the road.
