= M48 motorway =

Motorway in the United Kingdom

M48
- M48 highlighted in blue
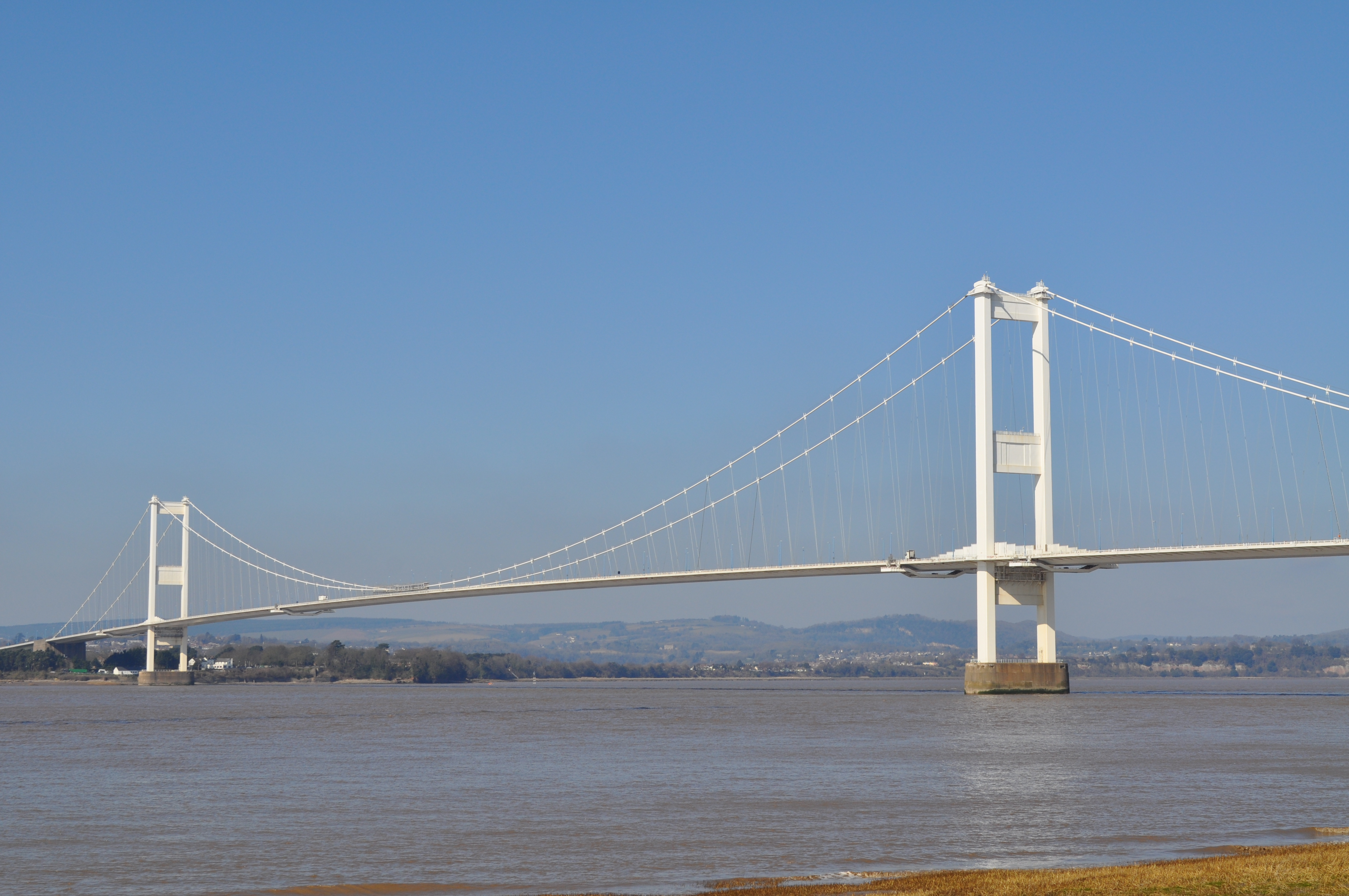
- The Severn Bridge in 2010

Route information
- Maintained by National Highways (England) and the South Wales Trunk Road Agent
- Length: 13 mi (21 km)
- Existed: 1966–present

Major junctions
- East end: Awkley
- J21 → M4 motorway J23 → M4 motorway
- West end: Magor

Location
- Country: United Kingdom
- Primary destinations: Chepstow

Road network
- Roads in the United Kingdom; Motorways; A and B road zones
← M45	→ M49

The M48 is a 13-mile-long (21 km) motorway in Great Britain, which crosses the Severn near Chepstow, Monmouthshire, linking England with Wales via the Severn Bridge. This road used to be the M4, and as a result is anomalously numbered: as it lies to the north of the M4 and to the west of the M5, it is in the Motorway Zone 5. The M4, M48 and the A48(M) motorway are the only motorways in Wales.

== Route ==
Travelling from east to west, after leaving the M4 at Awkley, junction 21, near Olveston in England, the M48 begins by heading north-west towards Aust, junction 1. It crosses the Severn and Wye rivers via the Severn Bridge. Entering Wales, the M48 heads south-west after junction 2, passing to the south of Chepstow, past Crick and continuing in a south-westerly direction, passing Caldicot and Rogiet. The motorway rejoins the M4 at Undy, junction 23 to the east of Magor.

Junction 2 can be reached via the A466, which leads to the A48. The junction gives access to the Wye Valley, an Area of Outstanding Natural Beauty. When travelling either east or west on the M4, the M48 is the more direct route for Chepstow and Caldicot.

== History ==
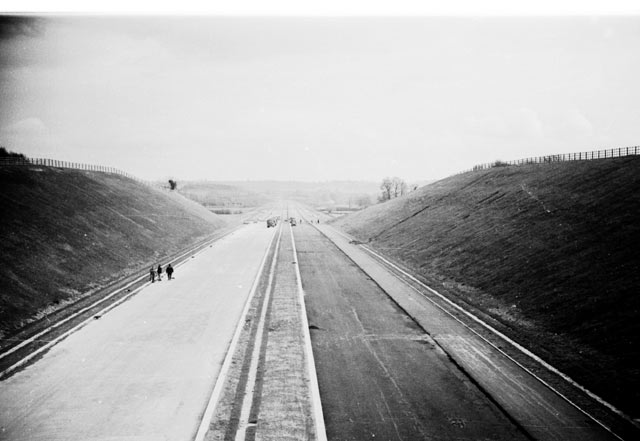
Construction near the hamlet of Ingst

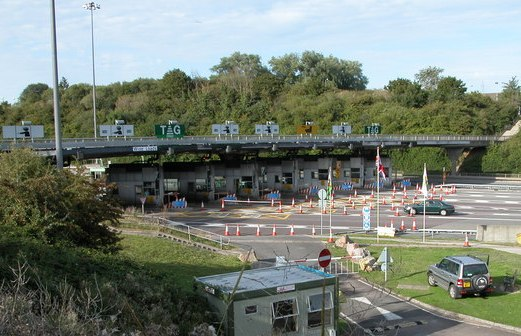
M48 toll booths toll-free since 17 December 2018

=== Construction ===
The M48 was opened as part of the M4 in 1966. Before this date traffic between South West England and South Wales was either transported on a motorail service through the Severn Tunnel, used the Aust Ferry (which was unsuitable for large goods vehicles) or travelled through Gloucester to pass north of the Severn Estuary. The route became increasingly busy and in 1984 a report was commissioned.

=== Redesignation ===
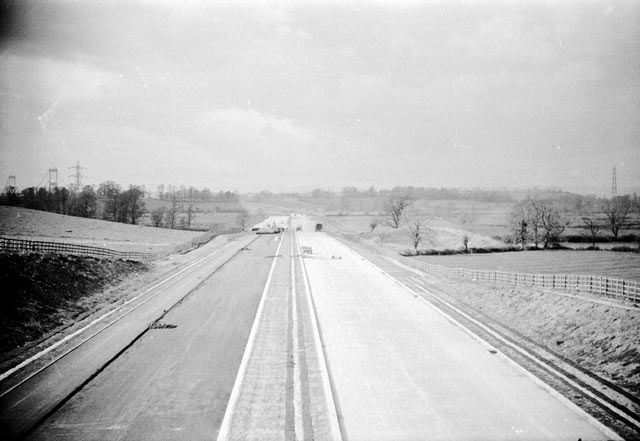
Looking west in April 1966

After four years of construction, the Second Severn Crossing was opened in 1996 and was designated M4. The original stretch of motorway was designated M48 and continues to link England and Wales. Since 17 December 2018, both crossings have been toll-free.

In October 2021, the Welsh Government announced it was considering the possibility of reclassifying the M48 into an A-road. The government stated this is due to a large decrease in traffic following the opening of the Second Severn Crossing. The government plans to improve connectivity between local roads and the M48 in Wales but state that building new junctions to a Motorway-standard would be too costly considering the lower amount of traffic the M48 now handles. Reclassification of the motorway requires approval of both the Welsh Government and Secretary of State for Wales, with the Department for Transport stating they have no plans to reclassify the road.

== Services ==
Severn View services are at junction 1, formerly called Aust Services when originally opened, and may also be accessed via the A403 from Avonmouth. There is a footpath leading from the services to allow pedestrians to cross the bridge. When the M4 was diverted over the Second Severn Crossing, it was anticipated that these services may close. The original building offered views of the River Severn. It was sold and operations continue in a new, smaller development on an adjacent site nearer the motorway junction.

== Junctions ==
M48 motorway junctions
mile	km	Eastbound exits (B carriageway)	Junction	Westbound exits (A carriageway)
117.6	189.3	London, Bath, Bristol M4	M4 J21; Terminus	Chepstow, Services M48; Start of motorway
120.5	193.9	Avonmouth A403, Services	J1; Services	Avonmouth A403, Services
121.1; 122.8	194.9; 197.6	Severn Bridge; Entry into England; Wye Bridge	River Severn; Border; River Wye	Severn Bridge; Entry into Wales; Wye Bridge
123.2; 123.4	198.2; 198.6	Gloucester, Chepstow A466 (A48); Caerloyw, Cas – gwent	J2	Gloucester, Chepstow A466 (A48); Caerloyw, Cas – gwent
130.2	209.6	Start of motorway Chepstow, Services M48; Cas – gwent, Gwasanaethau	Terminus; M4 J23	Newport, Cardiff M4; Casnewydd, Caerdydd
Notes: Distances in kilometres and carriageway identifiers are obtained from driver location signs/location marker posts. Where a junction spans several hundred metres and the data is available, both the start and finish values for the junction are shown.
1.000 mi = 1.609 km; 1.000 km = 0.621 mi

Data from driver location signs are used to provide distance and carriageway identifier information. Where a junction spans several hundred metres and start and end points are available, both are cited. Information above gathered from Advanced Direction Signs May 2011.

== See also ==
- List of motorways in the United Kingdom
- Nedern Brook Wetlands
