= M4 motorway =

Major motorway in England and Wales

M4

- M4 highlighted in blue Shown with UK motorway network

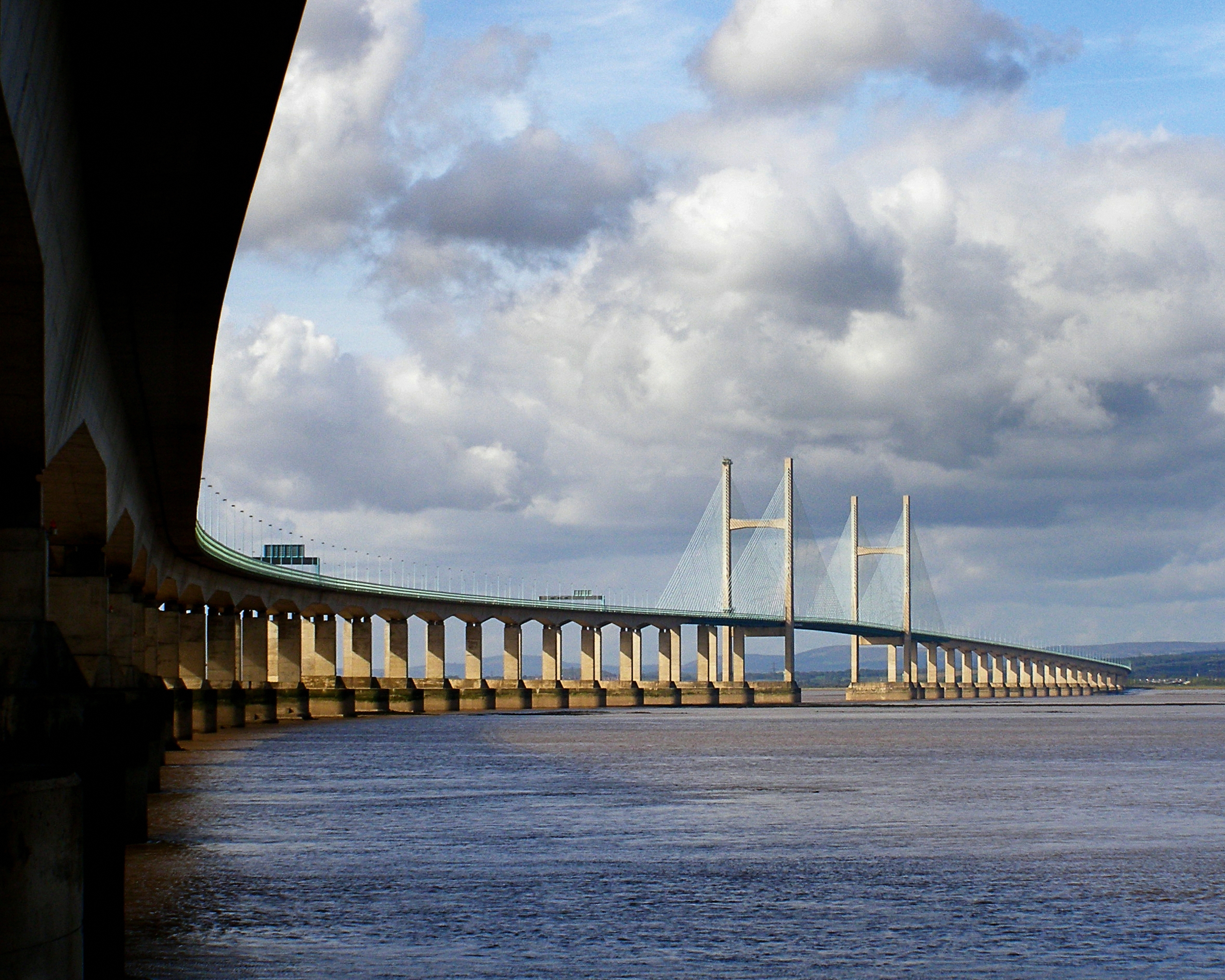
- Prince of Wales Bridge looking towards Wales, 2009

Route information
- Part of E30
- Maintained by National Highways; South Wales Trunk Road Agent
- Length: 189 mi (304 km)
- Existed: 1963–present
- History: Opened: 1959 (Chiswick Flyover), 1961 (as A4(M)), 1963, 1966 (as A48(M)); Completed: 1996

Major junctions
- East end: Chiswick; 51.4897°N 0.2781°W
- J4b → M25 motorway / J8/9 → A308(M) motorway/A404(M) motorway J10 → A329(M) motorway J19 → M32 motorway J20 → M5 motorway J21 → M48 motorway J22 → M49 motorway J23 → M48 motorway J29 → A48(M) motorway
- West end: Pont Abraham; 51.7451°N 4.0651°W

Location
- Country: United Kingdom
- Counties: Greater London, Buckinghamshire, Berkshire, Wiltshire, Gloucestershire, Monmouthshire, Newport, Cardiff, Vale of Glamorgan, Rhondda Cynon Taf, Bridgend, Neath Port Talbot, Swansea, Carmarthenshire
- Primary destinations: London; Heathrow Airport; Slough; Maidenhead; Reading; Newbury; Swindon; Bristol; Newport; Cardiff; Bridgend; Port Talbot; Neath; Swansea

Road network
- Roads in the United Kingdom; Motorways; A and B road zones

The M4, originally the London-South Wales Motorway, is the third-longest motorway in the United Kingdom, running from West London to West Wales. The English section to the Severn Bridge was constructed between 1961 and 1971; the Welsh element was largely complete by 1980, though a non-motorway section around Briton Ferry bridge remained until 1993. On the opening of the Second Severn Crossing in 1996, the M4 was rerouted over it.

The line of the motorway from London to Bristol runs closely in parallel with the A4. After crossing the River Severn, toll-free since December 2018, the motorway follows the A48, to terminate at the Pont Abraham services in Carmarthenshire.

The M4 is the only motorway in Wales apart from its two spurs: the A48(M) and the M48. The major towns and cities along the route—a distance of approximately 189 miles (304 km)—include Slough, Reading, Swindon, Bristol, Newport, Cardiff, Bridgend, Port Talbot and Swansea.

== History ==
A new road from London to South Wales was first proposed in the 1930s. In 1956 the Ministry of Transport announced the plans for the first major post-war road improvement projects.

The Chiswick flyover, a short section of elevated dual-carriageway, not originally classed as a motorway, opened in 1959 to reduce the impact of traffic travelling between central London and the west.

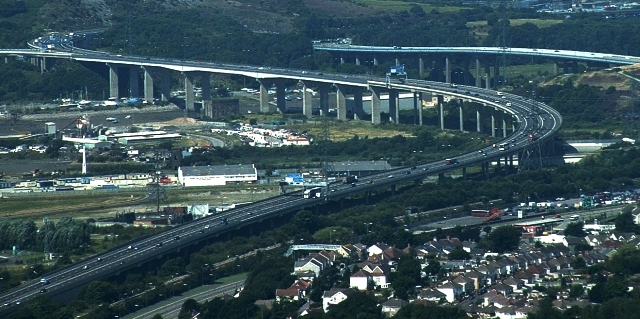
M4 bridge over the River Neath (left) and original A48(M) bridge (right)

The Maidenhead bypass (J7–J9) opened in 1961, the section from Slough to Maidenhead (J5–J7) opened in 1963 and J1–J5 opened on 24 March 1965, incorporating the Chiswick flyover. The stretch from J18 to the west of Newport was opened in 1966, including the Severn Bridge.

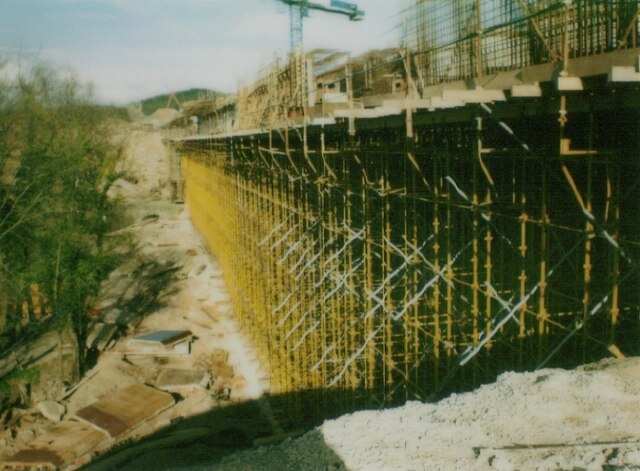
Construction in April 1980

The Port Talbot by-pass, also built in the 1960s and now part of the M4, was originally the A48(M) motorway, a number now allocated to a short section of motorway near Cardiff. The Ministry of Transport originally intended that the M4 would terminate at Tredegar Park west of Newport, but following the creation of the Welsh Office the government became committed to a high-standard dual carriageway to Carmarthenshire.

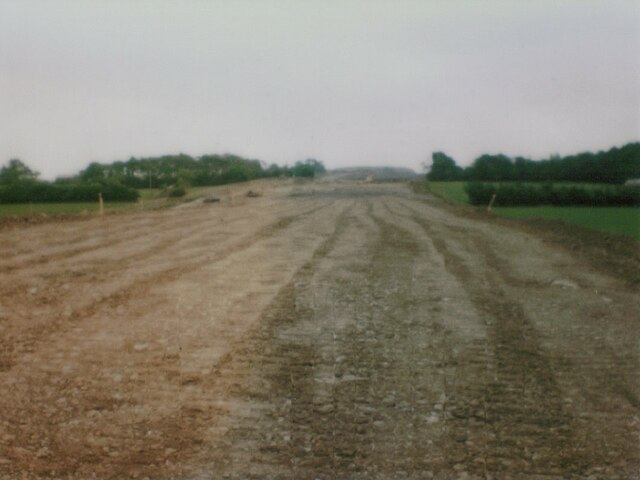
Construction in May 1980

The English section of the motorway was completed on 22 December 1971 when the 50-mile (80 km) stretch between junctions 9 and 15 (Maidenhead and Swindon) was opened to traffic. The Welsh section was largely completed between 1970 and 1980, though a non-motorway section remained across the Briton Ferry bridge until 1993, when a second motorway-only bridge opened.

In 1996, the Second Severn Crossing opened with new link motorways on either side of the estuary to divert the M4 over the new crossing. At the same time, the original route over the Severn Bridge was redesignated the M48, and the M49 was opened to link the new crossing with the M5 at Avonmouth. The new M49 shortened the route between South Wales and the South West, and reduced traffic at the busy M4/M5 junction at Almondsbury.

=== Choice of route ===
On March 18 1958, the twelve-mile elevated section to the Slough bypass was announced. In July 1958, this section would cost £12m, known as the London to South Wales Radial Road. The plan included the North Orbital junction at Richings Park.

On Tuesday July 26 1958 much of M4 route to the A33 junction was announced, that broadly follows the current route.

Sir Alexander Gibb was appointed in February 1961 to plan the route from the first section to Chippenham. The first choice of M4 route was in January 1963, for 72 miles, to Tormarton. After the CPRE were involved, the direct route became the 'modified direct route' by late 1963, and 'amended Bath Road route', but this was nothing like the final route, being quite twisty; this route was chosen to avoid the Marlborough countryside. But the Bath Road route was much disliked as it affected the Kennet Valley. People believed that the northern route would damage the area.

On March 18 1965, the 30-mile route from Tormarton in Gloucestershire to Lidington was fixed, which was similar to the original 'direct route'. It did not include the controversial centre section.

In mid-April 1965, the route east of Lidington would now become the eventual route, with two choices for rural western half of the route.

On Monday 9 August 1965 47 miles of the current route was largely announced, going further south than previous routes, towards the A34, and was five miles longer.

In early September 1966, the draft route of 10.5 miles from Lidington to Shefford Woodlands was published. The last section of the draft route was published on December 27 1966, from Poughley to Theale, being 20 miles, it was moved south of Chieveley.

The route from Holyport to Theale, 12.25 miles, was fixed in May 1967.

The M4 was Europe's busiest motorway in 1969, with up to 3,000 vehicles per hour.

=== After completion ===
In April 2005, speed checks carried out by police camera vans between junction 14 and junction 18 led to a public protest, involving a "go-slow" of several hundred vehicles along the affected sections of the motorway.

Between 2007 and January 2010, the section from Castleton (junction 29) to Coryton (junction 32) was widened to six lanes. The scheme was formally opened on 25 January 2010 by Ieuan Wyn Jones the Deputy First Minister for Wales.

During 2009, the Newport section of the motorway between junctions 23a and 29 was upgraded with a new concrete central barrier. In February 2010, it was proposed that the M4 in South Wales would become the first hydrogen highway with hydrogen stations provided along the route, with an aspiration for further stations to be provided along the M4 into South West England over time.

Between 2008 and 2010, junction 11 was extensively remodelled with a new four-lane junction, two new road bridges and other works. The £65 million scheme included work on the Mereoak roundabout and part of the A33 Swallowfield Bypass near Shinfield, and also the conversion of the two existing bridges, one of which is available only to pedestrians and cyclists and the other to buses. It also involved the movement of the local Highways Agency and Fire Service offices, and the construction of a long footbridge network, a new bus lane and a new gyratory. Sound barriers for nearby residential areas were also installed. In April 2008, the decision to preserve a rare Vickers machine gun pillbox and turn it into a bat roost was announced by the developers.

=== Former bridge tolls ===
Tolls were charged on the Severn Bridge(s) from opening until 2018. In 1966 the toll was 2s 6d (post-decimalisation equivalent £0.125) for cars, rising to £1 in the late 1980s. Around 1991 the toll was doubled, but charged in the westbound direction only, to reduce queuing. After 1996, the tolls were equal westbound-only on both bridges, and rose steeply after 2000 to a peak of £6.70 for cars in 2017, leading to protests from Welsh businesses. Tolls on both bridges over the River Severn were eliminated on 17 December 2018, and the former toll booths were removed in 2019.

== Construction ==
=== Slough bypass ===
Slough originally had plans for northern bypass in 1929. In November 1943 the route of the current bypass was chosen, including the Huntercombe Spur.

A £4.098m contract for the 5.5-mile bypass was awarded on April 4 1961. The two-lane bypass opened kn April 9 1963.

=== Maidenhead bypass ===
The current Maidenhead bypass was largely planned in 1929, from Maidenhead Thicket to the A4 near Taplow railway station. Construction started on May 19 1939 at Maidenhead Thicket, costing £287,559. The completed section was left derelict, by Tarmac. A £128,000 bridge over the Thames was partly built, by Sir William Arrol & Co., and abandoned in 1941.

By 1954, through traffic in Maidenhead was intolerable. On February 2 1955 it was announced that this bypass would be built in four years, from Maidenhead Thicket to the Huntercombe Spur, to the east, to rejoin the A4, to cost £2m, and 6 miles.

This bypass could have been the first motorway section in the UK, but in November 1955, the project was moved to fourth in a list of urgent motorway schemes. In 1956, construction would not begin before 1959. The draft route was published late April 1956, starting near Amerden Priory in Taplow, to the Holyport Road junction, through Cox Green to Maidenhead Thicket. In May 1956 Hugh Molson, Baron Molson said that the Slough and Maidenhead bypasses could not be built together, due to cost, so the Maidenhead bypass would be built first. In early February 1958, it was decided to build both bypasses together.

In March 1959, construction was to start in May 1959, to cost £2.5m. John Laing began construction on May 4 1959. The Buckinghamshire section was to open in March 1961, with the Maidenhead section in December 1960, with both sections linked by the M4 Thames Bridge, which cost £183,000, built by Horseley Ironworks of Tipton, with a 270 ft span.

There was bad weather in early 1961. In late March 1961, Maidenhead Council wanted the three-mile western section opened for Easter (April 2), but no road signs had been ordered by the Ministry. The Maidenhead Bypass opened briefly on March 30 1961, and fully opened in late June 1961.

In 1970, Costain realigned the Maidenhead bypass, and converted the bypass into three lanes.

=== Winnersh to Holyport ===
Costain built the section for £4,491,432 from January 1970. At Bracknell juvenile court, on August 16 1971, a 12 year old boy and his two 14 year old friends, were put on probation for a joyride with large construction vehicles, causing £800 of damage.

=== Theale to Winnersh ===
Costain built the section for £10,847,154 from January 1970.

=== Wickham to Theale ===
Sir Lindsay Parkinson & Company built the section for £9,179,226. The estate of Yattendon, now owned by the wealthy Yattendon Group, independently commissioned Sylvia Crowe to landscape the five-mile section near the village.

=== Lidington to Wickham ===
The section cost £7.1m, being 12.2 miles. Badbury, Wiltshire was the western end of this important section. Baydon, at 760ft, is highest point on the 50-mile section.

=== Wootton Bassett to Lidington ===
W. & C. French built the 11 miles for £6.4m,, which bypassed Swindon.

=== Tormarton to Wootton Bassett ===
19 miles was constructed for £8,886,105, to take 27 months, from early July 1969, the Tormarton to Stanton St Quintin section opened on June 15 1971, four months early.

=== Hambrook to Tormarton ===
From May 1965 the eight miles cost £5,276,828, being built by Alfred McAlpine - Fairclough

=== Almondsbury to Hambrook ===
In May 1963, after a lengthy inquiry in August 1962, the M4 would no longer go through Downend. The £2,148,911 contract went to Alfred McAlpine - Fairclough on April 27 1964 for 2.5 miles, and a third-mile of the Hambrook Spur

=== Timeline of construction ===
Year opened	1961	1963	1965	1966	1967	1971	1972	1977	1980	1994
Section(s)	J7–9	J5–7	J1–5	J18–23; J39–41	J22–28	J9–18	J44–46	J28–29; J32–35; J37–39; J46–49	J29–32; J35–37	J41–44

Animated map showing build progress at five-years (or greater) intervals. Note: When the Second Severn Crossing was opened in 1996, the M4 was re-routed and the section of motorway between Junctions 21 to 23 became the M48.

=== Maintenance ===
Maintenance of the Second Severn Crossing and the 123 miles (198 km) of motorway in England is the responsibility of National Highways. The 76 miles (122 km) in Wales is the responsibility of the South Wales Trunk Road Agent.

== Features ==
=== Speed limits ===
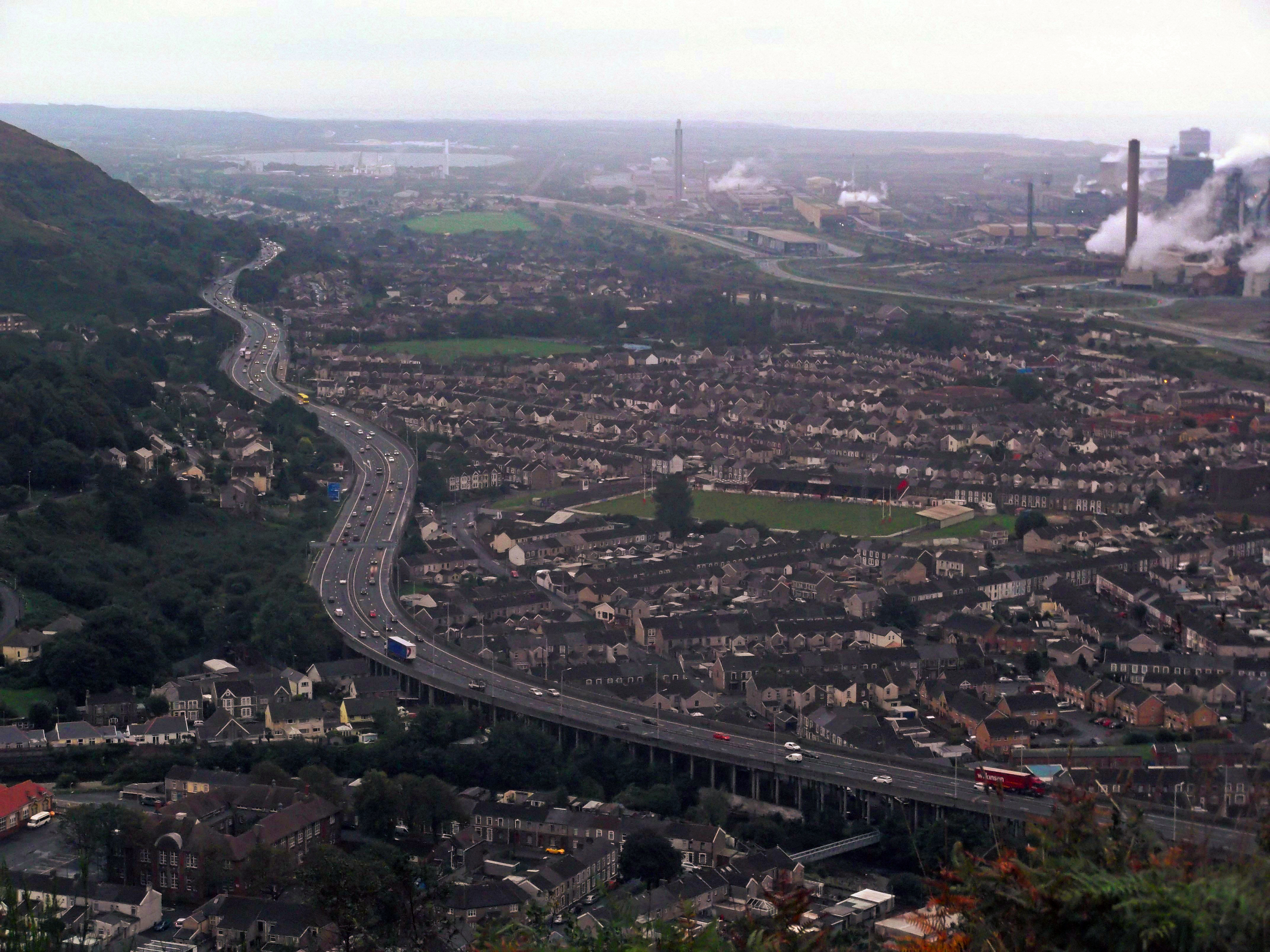
The M4 around Port Talbot

For the majority of its length, the national speed limit applies. Exceptions include the following:

- 40 mph (64 km/h) on the Chiswick Flyover within London in both directions.
- 60 mph (97 km/h) between junction 4 and the Chiswick Flyover, eastbound only.
- 50 mph (80 km/h) on the Port Talbot elevated section between junction 40 and junction 41. The fixed speed camera was removed in 2006 as it was believed to be causing tailbacks. In July 2014, an average speed camera system was installed; it generated around £500,000 in fines in the first six months.
- 50 mph (80 km/h) between junctions 24 and 28 at Newport.

=== Smart motorway ===
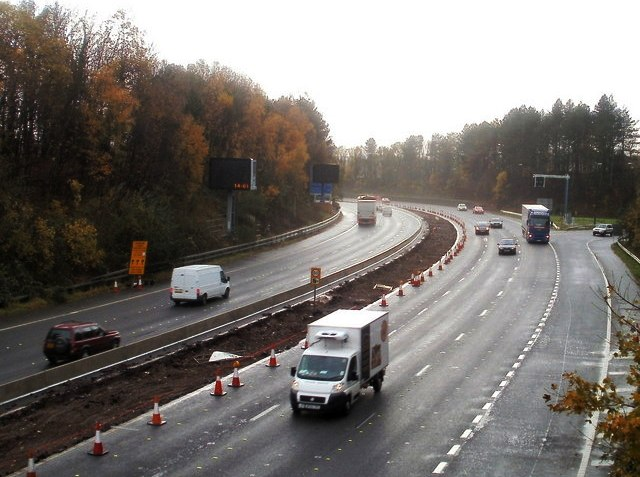
Construction of electronic indicator signs for the variable speed limit scheme at junction 27 and a new concrete reservation (2010)

The first section of smart motorway on the M4, between junctions 19 (M32) and 20 (M5) north of Bristol, has variable speed limits and includes a part-time hard-shoulder. Completion was in summer 2014. Another section between junctions 24 and 29 in Newport had variable speed limits until 2021, when it was changed to a permanent 50 mph (80 km/h) limit with average speed cameras.

In 2010, it was announced that the motorway would be changed to a smart motorway between junctions 3 and 12. With a length of 32 miles (51 km), on completion it became the longest smart motorway scheme in the United Kingdom. Work started in autumn 2018 and was completed ahead of schedule in December 2021 at a cost of £848 million. Further conversions to smart motorways have been halted indefinitely.

=== Brynglas tunnels ===
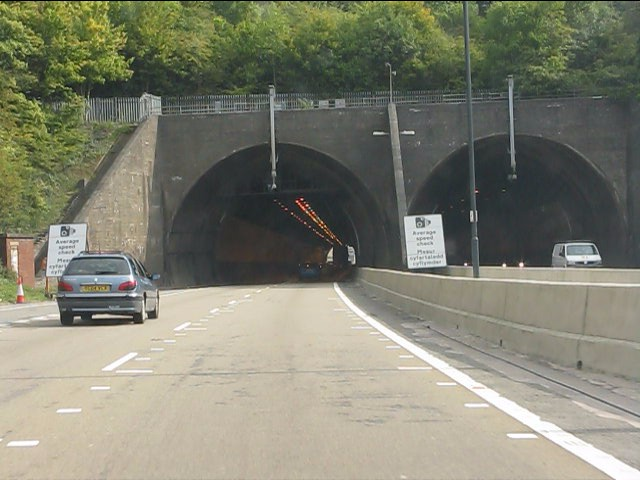
Brynglas Tunnels – western portals

The Brynglas Tunnels carry the M4 under Brynglas Hill in Newport. The 360-metre-long (390 yd) tunnels are the first and only twin–bored tunnels in the UK motorway network (the Dartford Tunnel is not classified as part of the M25 motorway). In July 2011, a lorry fire in one tunnel closed the motorway. Although there were no injuries and no deaths, the tunnel remained closed and a contraflow system was in place in the remaining tunnel for about one month, causing major travel delays.

=== Bus lane ===
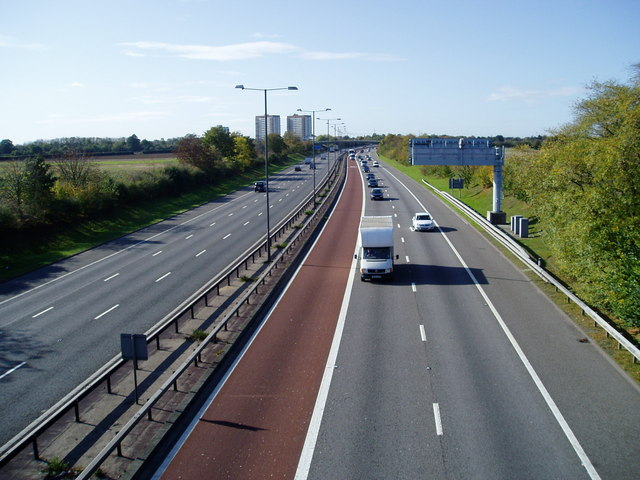
M4 bus lane near Norwood Green

In June 1999, the M4 bus lane was created on the third lane between junctions 2 and 3, initially as a pilot scheme and then a permanent arrangement from 2001. A lower speed limit was introduced along this section at the same time. The 3 1/2-mile (5.6 km) bus lane was on the eastbound carriageway; from the western end of the Chiswick Flyover near Brentford to junction 3 (A312), covering part of the 15-mile (24 km) journey between Heathrow Airport and central London. The lane which had no intermediate exits was for use by buses, coaches, motorcycles, emergency vehicles and licensed taxis but not mini-cabs.

In December 2010, the bus lane was suspended for 18 months. It was reinstated temporarily for the 2012 Summer Olympics and then permanently decommissioned.

=== Porous road surface ===
Near junction 35 of the M4, there is a stretch of the motorway that has a surfacing of porous asphalt that improves drainage and reduces noise. When driving in heavy rain drivers notice a reduction in road spray from other vehicles and improved visibility. This special surface was publicised in an episode of the BBC's Tomorrow's World programme. This was the site of the first trial of the new road surface when it was laid down in 1993.

=== Elevated and heated section ===
The elevated section of the M4 in West London, built in the 1960s, is mostly directly above the A4, extending over parts of Brentford's Golden Mile, and divides Boston Manor Park from its north-west to south-east perimeters. This section was designed to have a heated road surface to reduce icing in winter.

=== Four-level stack interchanges ===
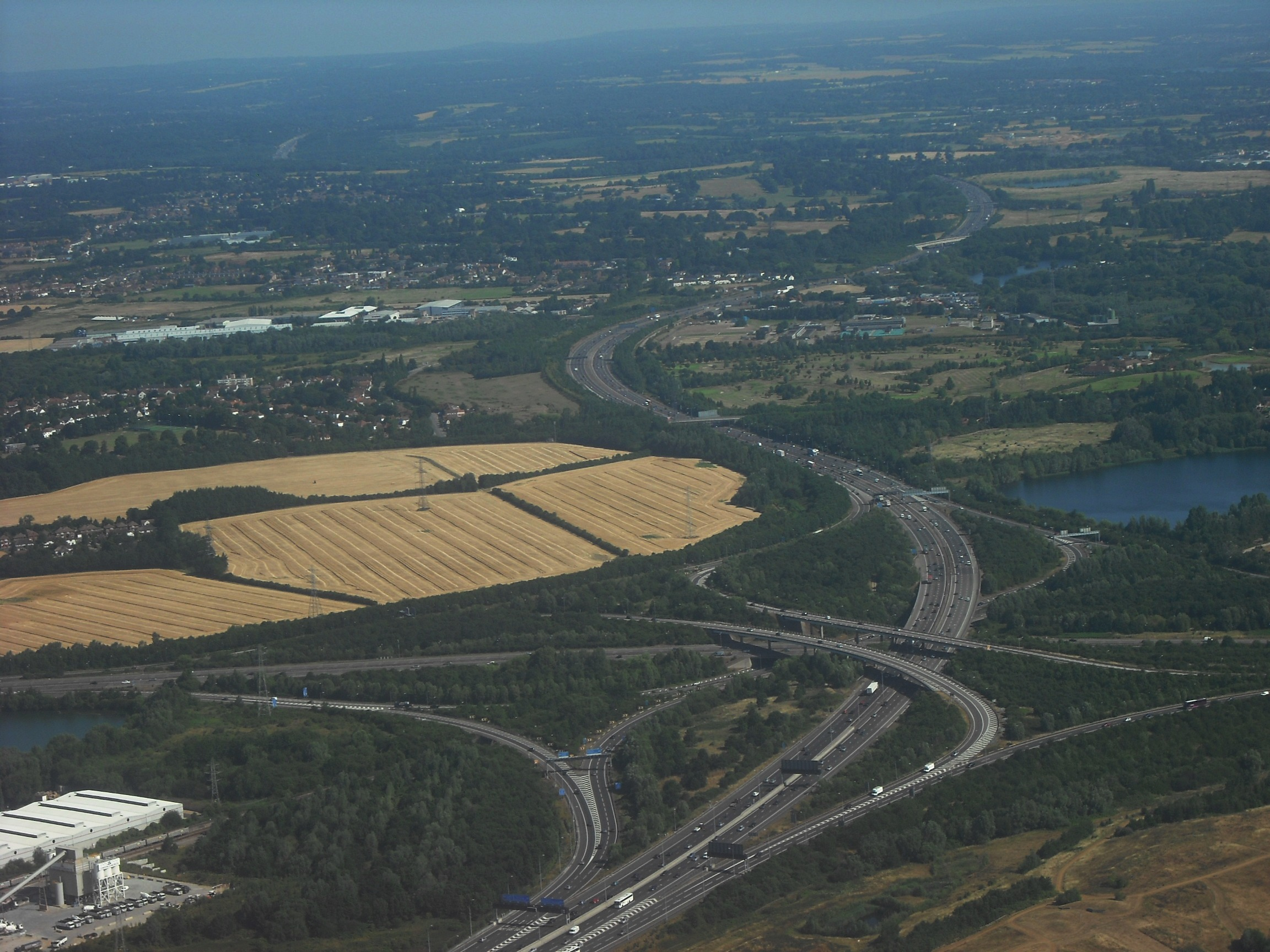
M4 junction with the M25 near Heathrow Airport

The M4 has two of the three four-level stack interchanges in the UK, including the first UK example at junction 20, the "Almondsbury Interchange" with the M5. The other is at junction 4b, the "Thorney Interchange" with the M25; this interchange has to make provision for a railway line passing beneath the M4. Due to the nature of these junctions, one cannot make a U-turn at either of them.

=== Notable junctions ===
Junction 8/9 near Maidenhead, Berkshire, and High Wycombe, Buckinghamshire is the only one in the UK with dual numbers. This dates from the time when the M4 turned north near junction 8, where it met the A308, and headed for the original junction 9, where the motorway ended at a roundabout interchange with the A4. When the westward extension was opened, junction 8 was closed and a new junction built a little to the west, taking both numbers. The road to the A4 became A423(M) and later A404(M), and the junction with the A4 became 9B. Junction 9A is the exit for Cox Green and White Waltham. To the west of junction 13 on the eastbound carriageway there are a set of sliproads signposted "Works Unit Only". The signs have red borders, implying a military exit. It is a back entrance to RAF Welford, a Second World War airfield and now an RAF/USAF military installation mainly used for storing munitions. The M4 entrance allows easier access for the large vehicles used to carry the munitions.

Plans for the "missing" Junction 31, also known as the Thornhill interchange, for which planning permission was originally granted in September 1991 (but subsequently expired), were rekindled after proposals for a new business park on a 125 acres (51 ha) site north of the M4 were submitted in 2007 to Cardiff Council. The developers of the business park, St Modwen Developments, would likely fund the new junction, which would be on the A469. A freedom of information request in 2010 to Cardiff Council shows that whilst the land that would enable this junction should continue to be strategically protected, the decision to formally abandon the proposed Junction 31 Thornhill was made in October 2007 and there had been no subsequent mention of it in Cardiff Council Strategic or Planning meetings since.

In South Wales, the M4 has to thread its way through mountainous terrain and built-up areas, so there are some unusual junction layouts. Junction 27 (High Cross) is a normal grade-separated roundabout junction, but has severe space constraints: traffic joining the motorway must initially travel in the opposite direction to the intended direction of travel, before making a sharp left-hand turn from the slip road onto the motorway. At the time of construction, junction numbers 30 and 31 were reserved for future intermediate interchanges. Junction 30 (Cardiff Gate) has since been added, but there are no current plans to construct Junction 31 (A469 road). Junction 39 can only be used to access the motorway from a single slip road onto the westbound carriageway from the A48 at junction 38. There is no exit from the motorway at this junction.

Junction 41 comprises two different junctions; one for local traffic to and from the west and one from the east. The former leads to and from a spur leading to the roundabout in Briton Ferry, formerly known as junction 41a, and the original bridge over the River Neath, which would allow access onto the stretch of the M4 from junction 43 westward. The second, eastern junction leads to and from the A48 towards Port Talbot. As a result, one can travel for almost 2 miles (3.2 km) on the motorway in either direction, both joining and then leaving the motorway at junction 41. Junction 44 is unusual in that the eastbound entrance dives under the inside of the junction, effectively creating a "right-turn" on a roundabout. Similarly, slip roads pass under or over the main motorway at junctions 41 and 42.

There have been calls to close the slip roads at junctions 40 and 41 to improve traffic flow. The motorway has only two lanes on this stretch and is a major traffic congestion blackspot. The short slip roads have not been modernised. A small-scale trial of closing the westbound on-slip of junction 41 between 7 am and 9 am and from 4 pm to 6 pm on weekdays started on 4 August 2014 but following heavy criticism from local businesses and residents, was stopped on 29 May 2015.

== Relief road ==
On 5 June 2019, the Welsh Government scrapped the proposal for a proposed motorway south of Newport. The Welsh Assembly Government had revived the scheme as a tolled bypass in 2007 and later abandoned it for financial reasons. An extension to the Newport Southern Distributor Road through the old Corus steel works was considered. This road is already a dual carriageway. A public consultation exercise on options for improving the capacity of the M4 corridor around Newport opened on 5 March 2012. Its website states that: "the motorway around Newport does not conform to today's motorway standards. It lacks continuous hard shoulders, has closely spaced junctions with sub-standard slip road visibility and narrows to a restricted two lane section through the Brynglas Tunnels. Heavy congestion occurs along this stretch and either side of it at peak hours."

== Junctions ==
County, Unitary Authority Area, or Principal Area	Location	mile	km	Junction	Destinations (eastbound)	Destinations (westbound)
Greater London	London Borough of Hounslow	7.3	11.8	1	Road continues as A4 – Central London	Start of motorway
Greater London	London Borough of Hounslow	8.3; 8.5	13.4; 13.7	2	A406 A205 anti-clockwise (South Circular) to A315 – Chiswick	A4 – Staines, Hounslow, Brentford
Greater London	London Borough of Hounslow	12.5; 12.8	20.1; 20.6	Heston services		
Greater London	London Borough of Hounslow	13.4; 13.7	21.5; 22.1	3	A312 – Heathrow (Terminals 4 & Cargo), Hayes, Feltham, Harrow, Hounslow	
Greater London	London Borough of Hillingdon	15.2; 15.7	24.5; 25.2	4	To A4 – Heathrow (Terminals 2 & 3) A408 – Uxbridge	
Greater London	Hillingdon–Iver–Colnbrook with Poyle boundary and Thorney (Thorney Interchange (Note: 51°29′41″N 0°29′44″W Thorney Interchange – Intersection of M4 and M25))	16.8; 17.7	27.0; 28.5	4B	M25 to M40 / M1 / M11 – Luton Airport, Stansted Airport, Oxford, Watford, Harlow M25 to M3 / M23 – Heathrow Airport Terminals 4, 5 & Cargo, Gatwick Airport, Southampton	
Berkshire	Slough–Colnbrook with Poyle boundary	19.1; 19.5	30.7; 31.4	5	A4 – Colnbrook, Langley; B470 – Eton, Datchet	
Berkshire	Slough	22.9; 23.2	36.8; 37.4	6	A355 – Slough (Central) A332 – Windsor	
Buckinghamshire	Burnham	24.7; 25.0	39.8; 40.3	7 Trumpet interchange	A4 – Slough (West)	
Berkshire	Bray	27.8; 28.2	44.7; 45.4	8/9	A404(M) – High Wycombe, Henley A308(M) – Maidenhead	
Berkshire	Winnersh–St Nicholas Hurst boundary	35.0; 35.8	56.4; 57.6	10; Partial cloverleaf interchange	A329(M) – Reading (East), Wokingham, Bracknell	
Berkshire	Reading	40.6; 41.2	65.4; 66.3	11	A33 – Basingstoke, Reading (Central & South)	
Berkshire	Burghfield	43.5; 43.8	70.0; 70.5	Reading services		
Berkshire	Theale–Calcot boundary	45.3; 45.7	72.9; 73.5	12	A4 – Reading (West), Theale	
Berkshire	Chieveley	56.9; 57.2	91.5; 92.1	13; Services (Note: 51°27′14″N 1°18′52″W Intersection of M4 and A34 (E05))	A34 – Newbury, Oxford; Chieveley services (Moto)	
Berkshire	Hungerford–Great Shefford boundary	64.4; 64.8	103.7; 104.3	14	A338 – Hungerford, Wantage	
Berkshire	Lambourn	68.7	110.5	Membury services		
Wiltshire	Chiseldon–Swindon boundary	76.4; 77.1	122.9; 124.0	15	A419 to A420 – Swindon (Central & East), Cirencester, Oxford A346 – Marlborough	
Wiltshire	Swindon–Lydiard Tregoze boundary	82.4; 82.8	132.6; 133.2	16	Swindon (West), Royal Wootton Bassett, Wroughton, MoD Lyneham, Calne A3102	
Wiltshire	Stanton St Quintin–Kington Langley boundary	94.8; 95.3	152.5; 153.4	17	Chippenham A350; Cirencester A429	
Wiltshire	Leigh Delamere	96.7	155.7	Leigh Delamere services		
South Gloucestershire, Bath & North East Somerset & Greater Bristol	Tormarton	104.9; 105.6	168.8; 170.0	18	Bath, Stroud A46	
South Gloucestershire, Bath & North East Somerset & Greater Bristol	Winterbourne, Gloucestershire	112.8; 113.2	181.5; 182.1	19	M32 – Bristol (Central & East)	
South Gloucestershire, Bath & North East Somerset & Greater Bristol	Almondsbury (Almondsbury Interchange (Note: 51°33′01″N 2°33′11″W Almondsbury Interchange – Intersection of M4 and M5))	115.8; 116.3	186.3; 187.2	20	The South West, Bristol (West & South), Bristol Airport, The Midlands, Bristol (North), Stroud, Gloucester, M5	The South West, Bristol (West & South), Bristol Airport, The Midlands, Bristol (North), Stroud, Gloucester, M5
South Gloucestershire, Bath & North East Somerset & Greater Bristol	Olveston	117.7; 189.5	189.5; 190.0	21	No access	Chepstow M48
South Gloucestershire, Bath & North East Somerset & Greater Bristol	Pilning and Severn Beach	121.3; 121.6	195.2; 195.7	22	Avonmouth, Bristol Airport, Weston-super-Mare M49	
South Gloucestershire, Bath & North East Somerset & Greater Bristol	River Severn	121.7; 124.1	195.9; 199.8	Second Severn Crossing (Note: 51°34′21″N 2°41′31″W Second Severn Crossing)		
Monmouthshire	River Severn	121.7; 124.1	195.9; 199.8	Second Severn Crossing		
Monmouthshire		127.0	204.4	Bridge Toll	No toll plaza	Former toll plaza (closed Dec 2018)
Monmouthshire	Rogiet	129.2	208.0	23	Chepstow M48	No access
Monmouthshire	Magor with Undy	131.4; 132.2	211.4; 212.8	23A; Services	Magor, Caldicot A4810; Magor services	
Gwent	Newport	134.8; 135.6	217.0; 218.3	24	City centre A48; Newport (East) B4237; Monmouth A449; The Midlands (M50)	City centre A48; Newport (East) B4237; Monmouth A449
Gwent	Newport	137.9	222.0	25	No access	Caerleon B4596
Gwent	Newport	138.3	222.6	25A	No access	Newport (East), Cwmbran A4042
Gwent	Newport	138.8; 139.1	223.4; 223.8	Brynglas Tunnels		
Gwent	Newport	139.1; 139.5	223.8; 224.5	26	Newport (North, Central & South), Cwmbran, Caerleon A4051	Newport (North, Central & South) A4051
Gwent	Newport	140.8; 141,4	226.6; 227.6	27	High Cross B4591	
Gwent	Newport	142.0; 142.9	228.5; 230.0	28	Newport (West) A48; Risca, Brynmawr A467	
Gwent	Castleton, Newport	143.6	231.1	29	No access	Cardiff (South & East) A48(M)
Glamorgan	Pontprennau	146.6; 147.3	236.0; 237.0	30/31; Services	Cardiff (East) A4232; Cardiff Gate services	
Glamorgan	Cardiff & St Fagans	151.9; 152.9	244.5; 246.1	32	Merthyr Tydfil, Cardiff (North & Central) A470	
Glamorgan	Cardiff & St Fagans	155.4; 156.0	250.1; 251.1	33; Services	Cardiff (West), Barry, Penarth A4232; Cardiff Airport; Cardiff West services	
Glamorgan	Pendoylan	157.5; 158.1	253.5; 254.4	34	Llantrisant, Rhondda A4119; Royal Glamorgan Hospital	
Glamorgan	Pencoed	163.9; 164.4	263.7; 264.5	35	Pen-coed A473	Bridgend, Pen-coed A473
Glamorgan	St Bride's Minor	167.5; 168.3	269.6; 270.8	36; Services	Bridgend A4061; Maesteg A4063; Princess of Wales Hospital; Sarn Park services	
Glamorgan	Cornelly	172.8; 173.5	278.1; 279.3	37	Pyle, Porthcawl A4229	
Glamorgan	Margam	177.0; 177.3	284.9; 285.3	38	Port Talbot A48	
Glamorgan	Margam	178.3	286.9	39	No access (on-ramp only)	No access
Glamorgan	Port Talbot	179.7; 179.9	289.2; 289.6	40	Port Talbot A4107	
Glamorgan	Port Talbot	180.9; 181.3	291.1; 291.8	41	Port Talbot A48	Briton Ferry A48
Glamorgan	Coedffranc	183.9; 184.9	295.9; 297.3	42	Briton Ferry A48; Swansea (South) A483	Swansea (South) A483
Glamorgan	Coedffranc	184.9; 185.7	297.5; 298.8	43	Neath, Merthyr Tydfil A465	
Glamorgan	Birchgrove, Swansea	187.0; 187.4	300.9; 301.6	44	Swansea (East) A48	
Glamorgan	Morriston	188.8; 189.3	303.9; 304.7	45	Pontardawe, Swansea (North & Central) A4067	
Glamorgan	Llangyfelach	190.8; 191.4	307.0; 308.0	46	Llangyfelach B4489; Felindre; Morriston Hospital	
Glamorgan	Penllergaer	192.4; 193.1	309.6; 310.7	47; Services	Swansea (West) A483; Gorseinon A48; Swansea services	
Carmarthenshire	Llanedi	196.4; 197.1	316.0; 317.2	48	Pontarddulais, Llanelli A4138	
Carmarthenshire	Llanedi	199.2	320.6	49/50; Terminus; Services (Note: 51°44′42″N 4°03′54″W Western end of M4)	Start of motorway	Motorway terminates at a roundabout: Carmarthen A48; Ammanford, Llandeilo A483; Pontarddulais A48; Pont Abraham services
Incomplete access

Coordinate list

Data from driver location signs and location marker posts are used to provide distance and carriageway identification information. Where a junction spans several hundred metres and the data is available, both the start and finish values for the junction are shown.

=== E30 ===
Although not signed, European route E30 includes most of the M4. The entire route runs 6,530 kilometres (4,060 mi) between Cork in Ireland and Omsk in Russia.

== Major incidents and accidents ==
- In June 1984 a crash near Maidenhead resulted in 13 deaths.
- In March 1991, ten people died in the 1991 M4 motorway crash near Hungerford. The crash involved 51 vehicles in foggy conditions.
- In May 1995 a coach carrying Royal British Legion members left the M4 close to the Severn Bridge, resulting in 10 deaths.
- In April 1998, drummer Cozy Powell died in a car accident while drink driving and speeding on the M4 near Bristol.
- In July 2002, Gus Dudgeon, a music producer known for his work with Elton John, and his wife died while driving, when he fell asleep and the car he was driving veered off the M4 between Reading and Maidenhead. The inquest recorded a verdict of accidental death.

== See also ==
- M4 corridor
- M4 Thames Bridge
- List of motorways in the United Kingdom
- Transport in Wales
