= List of onshore wind farms in England =

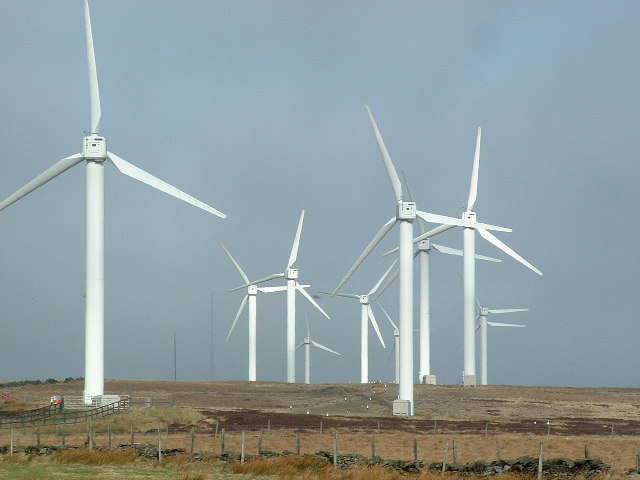
Ovenden Moor Wind Farm

This is a list of some onshore wind farms (more than 1 turbine) in England. This information is gathered from multiple Internet sources, primarily the UK Wind Energy Database from RenewableUK (formerly BWEA), and The Wind Power's database. The name of the wind farm is the name used by the energy company when referring to the farm and is usually related to the name of the physical location, e.g. hill, moor, fell, down etc. or the name of the agricultural farm for the smaller installations on property owned by farmers. The "wind farm" part is implied and hence removed for clarity in most cases. Wind farms are listed alphabetically under the county that they are located in.

Onshore wind farms in England
Wind farm	County	Coordinates	Model	Power per turbine (MW)	No.	Cap. (MW)	Online	Owner	Ref
Langford	Bedfordshire	52°3′29″N 00°15′11″W		2.00	10	20.00	2014	-	
Podington Airfield	Bedfordshire	52°13′50.8″N 00°36′13″W	GE 2.85-103	2.85	3	8.55	2014	Airfield Wind Farm Limited	
Milton Keynes	Buckinghamshire	52°08′10″N 00°39′52″W	Vestas V90	2.00	7	14.00	2010	Your Energy	
White Mill, Coldham	Cambridgeshire	52°34′29″N 00°08′45″W	REpower MM82	2.00	7	14.00	2012	Ventus VCT plc	
Coldham	Cambridgeshire	52°34′29″N 00°08′45″W		2.00	8	16.00	2005	ScottishPower	
Cotton Farm	Cambridgeshire	52°15′34.4″N 00°11′45″W	REpower MM92	2.05	8	16.4	2016	Greencoat Renewables	
Glass Moor	Cambridgeshire	52°34′06″N 00°06′41″W	REpower MM82	2.00	8	16.00	2006	Fenland Windfarms Ltd	
Glass Moor 2	Cambridgeshire	52°30′36″N 00°06′5.9″W	Senvion MM82	2.05	6	12.3	2013	EDF EN	
McCain Foods	Cambridgeshire	52°33′40″N 00°10′20″W	Vestas V90	3.00	3	9.00	2007	-	
Ransonmoor Farm	Cambridgeshire	52°29′42″N 00°01′26″E	Gamesa G80	2.00	3	6.00	2007	Ecogen	
Ransonmoor Farm Phase II	Cambridgeshire	52°29′42″N 00°01′26″E	REpower MM82	2.00	2	4.00	2008	Ecogen	
Red Tile	Cambridgeshire	52°27′02″N 00°00′27″W	REpower MM82	2.00	12	24.00	2007	EDF EN	
Stags Holt	Cambridgeshire	52°34′29″N 00°08′45″W	Vestas V80	2.00	9	18.00	2007	E.ON Renewables	
Wadlow	Cambridgeshire	52°9′57.8″N 00°18′47.1″E	Vestas V90	2.00	13	26.00	2012	Barclays Infrastructure Fund, RES	
Frodsham	Cheshire	53°17′46″N 02°45′28″W		2.65	19	50.35	2017		
Bears Down	Cornwall	50°28′23″N 04°57′11″W	Bonus B600	0.60	16	9.60	2001	Innogy	
Carland Cross	Cornwall	50°21′05″N 05°01′48″W	Gamesa	2.00	10	20.00	1992	ScottishPower	
Cold Northcott	Cornwall	50°38′14″N 04°31′07″W	WEG MS3-300	0.30	22	6.80	1993	First Wind Farm Holdings	
Delabole (Note: Delabole was the first commercial wind farm in the United Kingdom.)	Cornwall	50°38′14″N 04°42′15″W	Enercon E-70	2.30	4	9.20	1991	Good Energy Group plc	
Four Burrows	Cornwall	50°17′30″N 05°08′44″W	Bonus B300	0.30	15	4.50	1998	RES	
Goonhilly Repowering	Cornwall	50°02′46″N 05°11′56″W	Vestas V80	2.00	6	12.00	2010	-	
St Breock	Cornwall	50°28′36″N 04°51′45″W	Bonus B450	0.45	11	4.95	1994	E.ON Renewables	
WWF Roskrow Barton	Cornwall	50°10′19″N 05°09′08″W	Vestas V52	0.85	2	1.70	2008	-	
Broom Hill (includes Sunnyside)	County Durham	54°53′07″N 01°50′16″W	REpower MM82	2.00	4	8.00	2009	EDF Energy	
Hare Hill(3Hs)	County Durham	54°45′45″N 01°24′59″W	NEG Micon NM80	2.75	2	5.50	2004	E.ON Renewables	
High Haswell	County Durham	54°46′50″N 01°26′19″W	Vestas V80	2	2	4	2010	RES	
High Hedley Hope	County Durham	54°45′36″N 01°46′51″W	Nordex N50	0.75	3	2.25	2001	EDF Energy	
High Hedley Hope 2	County Durham	54°45′53″N 01°46′06″W	Nordex N60	1.30	4	5.20	2008	EDF Energy	
High Volts (3Hs)	County Durham	54°41′58″N 01°17′29″W	NEG Micon NM80	2.75	3	8.25	2003	E.ON Renewables	
Holmside Hall (3Hs)	County Durham	54°50′18″N 01°40′35″W	NEG Micon NM80	2.75	2	5.50	2004	E.ON Renewables	
Langley Park/Long Edge	County Durham	54°47′42″N 01°40′02″W	REpower 2.0	2.00	4	8.00	2008	EDF Energy	
Tow Law	County Durham	54°45′37″N 01°46′57″W	Nordex N50	0.77	3	2.31	2001	Beaufort Wind Limited	
Trimdon Grange	County Durham	54°42′47″N 01°25′10″W	Nordex N60	1.30	4	5.20	2008	EDF Energy	
Walkway, High Swainston	County Durham	54°40′27″N 01°23′04″W	REpower MM82	2.00	7	14.00	2008	EDF EN	
West Durham	County Durham	54°46′05″N 01°49′18″W	REpower MM82	2.00	12	24.00	2009	ESB Group	
WWA High Sharpley	County Durham	54°50′20″N 01°25′04″W	Nordex N60	1.30	2	2.60	2007	-	
Askam	Cumbria	54°11′14″N 03°10′20″W	Vestas V47	0.66	7	4.62	1999	E.ON Renewables	
Eastman (Voridian)	Cumbria	54°39′51″N 03°32′33″W	REpower MM82	2.00	2	4.00	2006	Workington Energy Ltd	
Fairfield	Cumbria	54°34′25″N 03°31′31″W	Nordex N60	1.30	5	6.50	2011	EDF Energy	
Great Orton II	Cumbria	54°52′01″N 03°04′31″W	Vestas V47	0.66	6	3.96	2000	First Wind Farm Holdings	
Harlock Hill	Cumbria	54°13′08″N 03°09′28″W	Wind World W3700	0.50	5	2.50	1997	Baywind Energy Co-operative	
Haverigg windcluster (Note: Since Haverig II etc. "Haverigg windcluster" is referred to as "Haverigg I".)	Cumbria	54°12′03″N 03°19′45″W	Vestas V27	0.22	5	1.10	2004		
Haverigg II	Cumbria	54°12′03″N 03°19′45″W	Wind World W600	0.60	4	2.40	1998	Triodos Renewables	
Haverigg III	Cumbria	54°12′03″N 03°19′45″W	Vestas V52	0.85	4	3.40	2005	Windcluster Ltd	
Kirkby Moor	Cumbria	54°14′46″N 03°09′08″W	Vestas WD34	0.40	12	4.80	1993	Beaufort Wind Limited	
Lambrigg	Cumbria	54°20′07″N 02°38′18″W	Bonus B1300	1.30	5	6.50	2000	Beaufort Wind Limited	
Lowca	Cumbria	54°35′34″N 03°34′33″W	Vestas V47	0.66	7	4.62	2000	E.ON Renewables	
Oldside	Cumbria	54°39′34″N 03°33′34″W	Vestas V42	0.60	9	5.40	1996	E.ON Renewables	
Siddick	Cumbria	54°40′16″N 03°32′35″W	Vestas V42	0.60	7	4.20	1996	E.ON Renewables	
Wharrels Hill	Cumbria	54°43′36″N 03°16′57″W	Nordex N60	1.30	8	10.40	2007	Wharrels Hill LLP	
Winscales Moor	Cumbria	54°38′32″N 03°29′49″W	Vestas V52	0.85	7	5.95	2009	Winscales Moor Wind Farm Ltd	
Winscales	Cumbria	54°51′51″N 03°05′15″W	Vestas V47	0.66	3	1.98	1999	K/S Winscales	
Winscales Extension	Cumbria	54°51′51″N 03°05′15″W	Vestas V52	0.85	8	6.80	2005	K/S Winscales	
WWU High Pow	Cumbria	54°46′51″N 03°09′35″W	Nordex N60	1.30	3	3.90	2007	-	
Hellrigg	Cumbria	54°50′49.798″N 03°20′50.222″W		2.30	4	9.20	2011	-	
Carsington Pasture	Derbyshire	53.086547°N 1.631120°W		2.50	4	10.00			
Forestmoor	Devon	50°53′39″N 04°24′57″W	Vestas NM60	1.00	3	2.70	2005	Energiekontor	
Fraisthorpe	East Riding of Yorkshire	54°03′02″N 0°13′46″W	V112-3.3	3.30	9	29.70	2016	Octopus Investments	
Goole Fields 1	East Riding of Yorkshire	53°40′58″N 00°47′41″W	Senvion MM92	2.05	16	32.8	2014	RWE	
Goole Fields 2	East Riding of Yorkshire	53°40′58″N 00°47′41″W	Senvion MM92	2.05	17	34.85	2017	RWE	
Hall Farm	East Riding of Yorkshire	53°52′1.8″N 00°22′15.8″W	REpower MM82	2.05	12	24.6	2013	John Laing Investments	
Lissett Airfield	East Riding of Yorkshire	54°00′35″N 00°15′15″W	Nordex N90	2.50	12	30.00	2009	-	
Loftsome Bridge Water Treatment Works	East Yorkshire	53°45′26″N 00°56′16″W	Nordex N60	1.30	2	2.60	2008	-	
Out Newton	East Riding of Yorkshire	53°40′03″N 00°06′04″W	Bonus B1300	1.30	7	9.10	2002	E.ON Renewables	
Sixpenny Wood	East Riding of Yorkshire	Wood Wind Farm 53°43′58.8″N 00°48′2.6″W	Senvion MM92	2.05	10	20.50	2013	Greencoat Renewables, Swiss Life	
Spaldington Airfield	East Riding of Yorkshire	53°47′31.6″N 00°51′1.4″E	Enercon E92	2.30	5	11.5	2016	Falck Renewables	
Bradwell-on-Sea	Essex	51°43′6.6″N 00°55′24.4″E	REpower MM82	2.00	10	20.00	2013	Falck Renewables	
Earls Hall	Essex	51°48′47.7″N 01°6′42.9″E	Senvion MM92	2.05	5	10.25	2013	Greencoat Renewables	
Bristol Port	Gloucestershire	51°29′40″N 02°41′08″W	Enercon E82	2.00	8	16.00	2007	Ecotricity	
Little Cheyne Court	Kent	50°57′45″N 00°49′13″E	Nordex N90	2.30	26	59.80	2009	RWE 59%, Greencoat Renewables 41%	
Caton Moor Repowering	Lancashire	54°03′39″N 02°39′25″W	REpower MM70	2.00	8	16.00	2006	Triodos Renewables	
Coal Clough	Lancashire	53°44′55″N 02°10′03″W	Vestas WD34	0.40	24	9.60	1992	ScottishPower, SWEB, RES	
Scout Moor	Greater Manchester & Lancashire	53°40′01″N 02°16′26″W	Nordex N80	2.50	26	65.00	2008	Peel Wind Power Ltd	
WWP Hameldon Hill	Lancashire	53°47′19″N 02°09′39″W	REpower MD 70/77	1.50	3	4.50	2007	Innogy	
Hyndburn	Lancashire	53°42′52″N 02°23′10″W	REpower MM82	2.05	12	24.6	2012	-	
Swinford	Leicestershire	52.42°N 1.17°W	Vestas V90	2.00	11	22.00	2012	Vattenfall	
Bagmoor	Lincolnshire	53°38′14″N 00°37′58″W	REpower MM92	2.00	8	16.00	2009	-	
Bambers Farm	Lincolnshire	53°19′44″N 00°15′03″E	Enercon E44	0.60	8	4.80	2004	Ecotricity	
Bambers Farm II	Lincolnshire	53°19′39″N 00°14′25″E	Enercon E48	0.60	6	4.80	2006	Ecotricity	
Bicker Fen	Lincolnshire	52°55′34″N 00°12′59″W	REpower MM82	2.00	13	26.00	2008	EDF EN	
Bishopthorpe	Lincolnshire	53°30′52″N 00°12′9″E	Senvion MM92	2.05	8	16.40	2017	Greencoat Renewables	
Conisholme Fen Resubmission	Lincolnshire	53°25′32″N 00°04′48″W	Enercon E48	0.80	20	16.00	2008	Ecotricity	
Deeping St Nicholas	Lincolnshire	52°43′58″N 00°13′01″W	REpower MM82	2.00	8	16.00	2006	Fenland Windfarms Ltd	
Gedney Marsh (Red House)	Lincolnshire	52°50′23″N 00°06′24″W	REpower MM82	2.00	6	12.00	2006	Greencoat Renewables	
Mablethorpe	Lincolnshire	53°19′39″N 00°14′25″E	Enercon E40	0.60	2	1.20	2002	Ecotricity	
The Hollies	Lincolnshire	53°07′46″N 00°14′53″E	Nordex N60	1.30	2	2.60	2008	Innogy	
Dagenham	London	51°31′18″N 00°09′02″E	Enercon E66	1.80	2	3.60	2004	Ecotricity	
Mersey Docks	Merseyside	53°27′31″N 03°01′49″W	Nordex N90	2.50	4	10.00	2008	-	
Royal Seaforth Dock	Merseyside	53°27′31″N 03°01′49″W	Vestas V44	0.60	6	3.60	1999	Peel Wind Power Ltd	
Blood Hill	Norfolk	52°42′41″N 01°40′03″E	Vestas V27	0.225	10	2.25	1992	E.ON Renewables	
Jack's Lane	Norfolk	52°52′46″N 00°43′41″E	Nordex N90	2.5	6	15	2015	RES	
North Pickenham Wind Farm	Norfolk	52°37′34″N 00°44′59″E	Vestas V90	1.80	8	14.40	2006	Enertrag UK	
Knabs Ridge, Felliscliffe	North Yorkshire	53°59′42″N 01°38′35″W	REpower MM70	2.00	8	16.00	2008	Innogy	
Rusholme	North Yorkshire	53°43′32″N 00°55′15″W	REpower MM82	2.00	12	24.00	2010	EDF EN	
Burton Wold	Northamptonshire	52°21′23″N 00°39′02″W	Enercon E70	2.00	10	20.00	2006	Burton Wold Wind Farm Ltd	
Chelveston Renewable Energy Park	Bedfordshire & Northamptonshire	52°18′28.5″N 00°31′15.8″W	GE 2.85-103	2.85	9	25.65	2013	Chelveston Renewable Energy Limited	
M1 Junction 18 (Daintree)	Northamptonshire	52°20′50.9″N 01°09′25.7″W	Vestas V90	2.0	2	4	2014	Daintree Wind Farm Limited	
Roade (M1)	Northamptonshire	52°09′41.5″N 00°51′44.3″W	Enercon E48	0.8	9	7.20	2013	EDF EN	
Yelvertoft	Northamptonshire	52°22′31.8″N 01°09′02.7″W	Senvion MM92	2.05	8	16.40	2013	Greencoat Renewables, Swiss Life	
Blyth Harbour	Northumberland	55°07′20″N 01°29′25″W	WindMaster WM28	0.30	9	2.70	1993	Hainsford Energy (Blyth Harbour) Limited	
Green Rigg	Northumberland	55°05′56″N 02°11′55″W	Vestas V80	2	18	36	2012	EDF Energy	
Kirkheaton	Northumberland	55°04′58″N 01°59′26″W	Nordex N43	0.60	3	1.80	2000	EDF Energy	
Middlemoor	Northumberland	55°30′16.3″N 01°46′48.3″W	Vestas V90	3.0	18	54.0	2013	RES, Greencoat Renewables	
North Steads	Northumberland	55.266°N 1.618°W	Senvion MM92	2.05	9	18.45	2016		
Lindhurst	Nottinghamshire	53°06′58″N 01°08′48″W	Vestas V90	1.80	5	9.00	2010	-	
Westmill	Oxfordshire	51°37′02″N 01°40′09″W	Siemens SWT-1.3	1.30	5	6.50	2008	Westmill Wind Farm Cooperative Ltd	
Hampole	South Yorkshire	53.574°N 1.229°W	REpower MM92	2.05	4	8.2	2014	-	
Loscar	South Yorkshire	53°18′36″N 01°14′37″W	Acciona AW1500	1.5	3	4.5	2010	-	
Penny Hill	South Yorkshire	53°22′58″N 1°17′17″W	Senvion XM3.4	3.40	6	20.40	2014	-	
Royd Moor	South Yorkshire	53°31′55″N 01°40′10″W	Bonus M1500-500	0.50	13	6.50	1993	E.ON Renewables	
Great Eppleton Repowering	Tyne & Wear	54°49′59″N 01°25′46″W	REPower MM92	2.05	4	8.20	2010	E.ON Renewables	
Nissan Motors Plant	Tyne & Wear	54°55′12″N 01°28′05″W	Vestas V47	0.66	6	3.96	2005	Nissan	
Hazlehead	West Yorkshire	53°32′3.5″N 1°43′50.7″W	REpower MM82	2.05	3	6.15	2011	Banks Group	
Hook Moor	West Yorkshire	53°48′31.3″N 1°19′49.1″W	Senvion MM92	2.05	5	10.25	2015	Banks Group	
Ovenden Moor	West Yorkshire	53°46′27″N 01°56′05″W	Vestas WD34	2.50	9	22.50	1993	Yorkshire Wind Power Ltd	;
