= Lawrence Weston Wind Turbine =

Wind turbine in Bristol, England

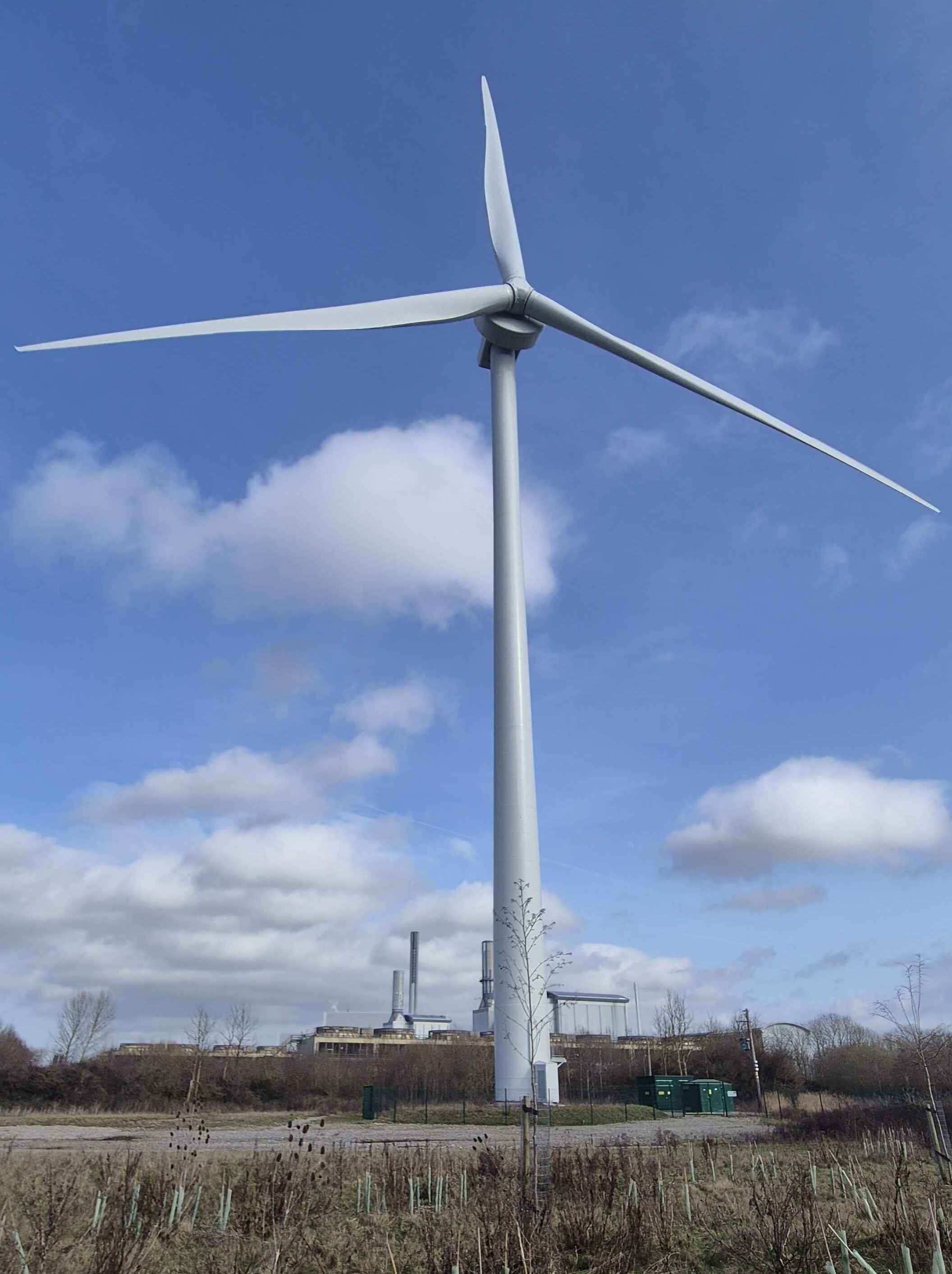
- The wind turbine in February 2026, with the Seabank Power Station in the background
- Official name: Ambition Community Energy CIC Wind Turbine
- Country: England
- Location: Avonmouth, Bristol
- Coordinates: 51°32′16.5″N 2°40′26.4″W
- Status: Operational
- Construction began: 4 July 2022
- Commission date: May 2023
- Construction cost: £5.5m
- Owners: Ambition Community Energy CIC (ACE); Thrive Renewables
- Operator: Ambition Community Energy CIC

Wind farm
- Type: Onshore
- Hub height: 150 m (490 ft)
- Rotor diameter: 115.7 m (380 ft)
- Rated wind speed: 13.2 m/s (43 ft/s)

Power generation
- Nameplate capacity: 4.25 MW
- Annual net output: 10.9 GWh

External links
- Commons: Related media on Commons

The Lawrence Weston Wind Turbine, also known as the Ambition Community Energy Wind Turbine, is a community-owned wind turbine located in Avonmouth, Bristol, England, near the Seabank Power Station. It is situated beside the A403 road and Severn Estuary, just north of the Avonmouth Docks and Chittening industrial estate and south of Severn Beach, close to the boundary with South Gloucestershire. The wind turbine, which began operating in May 2023, serves to support the nearby Lawrence Weston subdivision by generating and selling electricity to the National Grid, where surplus revenue is then used to fund projects and infrastructure in the community. It's 150 metres (490 ft) in height, making it the tallest onshore wind turbine in England as well as the tallest structure in Bristol.

Ambition Lawrence Weston (ALW), a community-led charity group dedicated to supporting the community of Lawrence Weston, formed the offshoot community interest company Ambition Community Energy (ACE) to facilitate the creation of the wind turbine. Planning for the Lawrence Weston Wind Turbine began in late 2016 with negotiations between ACE and the Bristol City Council. By 2020, the wind turbine project was approved by the council and the government, with funding for the project acquired the following year through loans and grants from organisations such as Thrive Renewables and the West of England Combined Authority (WECA). Construction of the Lawrence Weston Wind Turbine began in mid-2022 and was completed in early May the following year.

== Background ==
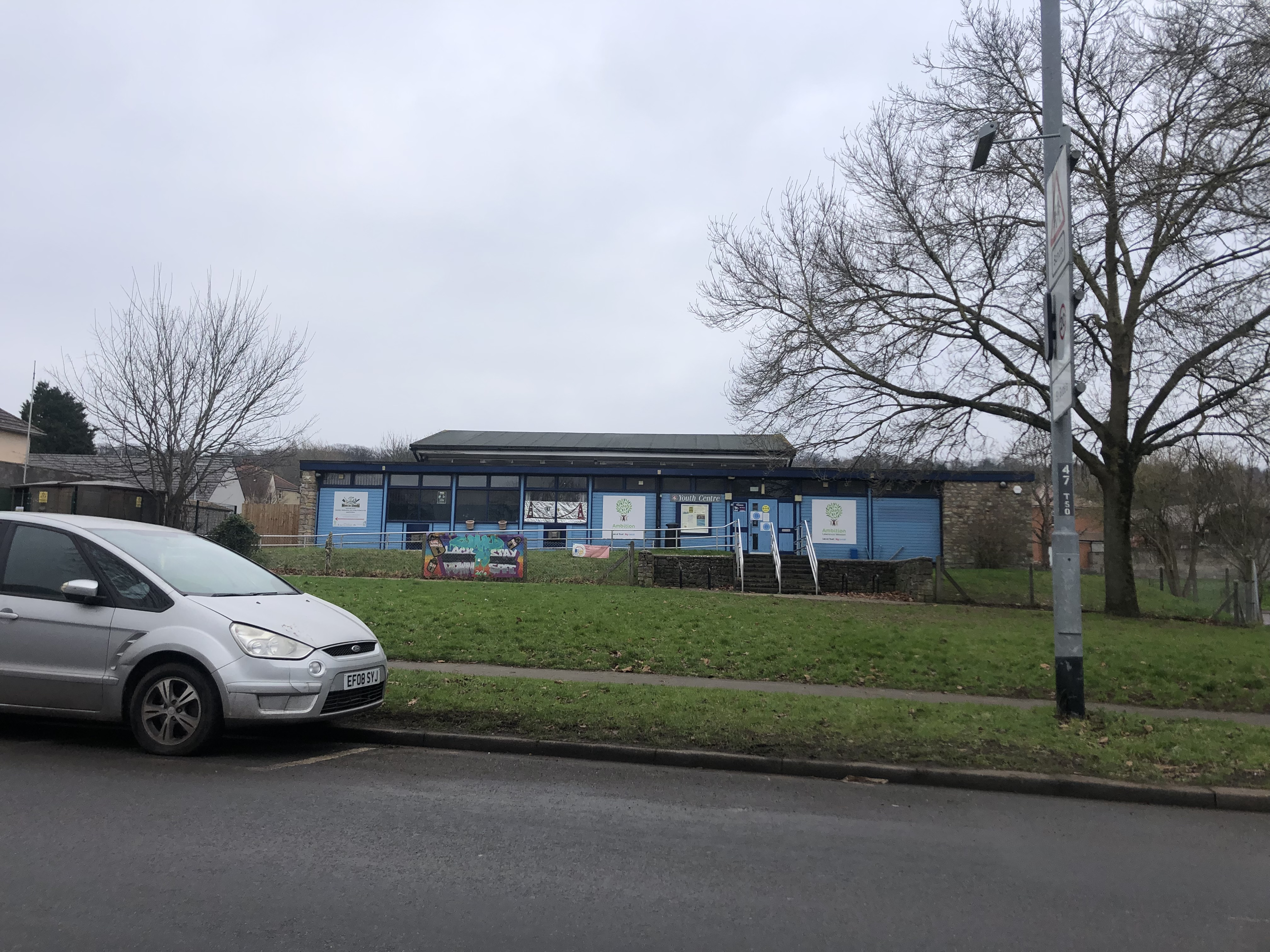
The Ambition Lawrence Weston youth centre in 2022

In 2012, a group of Lawrence Weston residents led by Mark Pepper founded the grassroots charity Ambition Lawrence Weston (ALW) in an effort to improve the area for people to live and work due to recent decline in services. Over the following decade, ALW contributed to the protection of green spaces in the area. It also prevented a local youth centre from closure, later developing it into a community hub to help residents find employment. The charity also focused on developing local energy supplies for the community. ALW had also engaged with the Cold Home Energy Efficiency Survey Experts (CHEESE) group to explore ways to improve energy efficiency for homes, which resulted in the operation of a photovoltaic solar array and the development of a wind turbine.

According to researcher Max Lacey-Barnacle, the Lawrence Weston housing estate, located in the northwest region of Bristol, has been described as being an area of "high deprivation". In a study published by the Bristol City Council (BCC) in 2015, the area was considered one of the most deprived areas of Bristol and was named as being one of the "most deprived 10% of areas in England". Additionally, the estate was noted for high unemployment, and limited amenities and access to green space, leading to the area garnering a reputation for being a "'neglected' area of [Bristol]." According to Pepper, some of the estate's 3,200 homes "suffer[ed] from poor insulation and low-energy efficiency" which led to impacts on fuel poverty.

In 2015, UK Prime Minister David Cameron introduced a de facto ban on the construction of onshore wind turbines, claiming that the country had enough wind energy. Under the ban, wind projects would required unanimous local support in order for new wind turbines to be constructed. As a result, granted planning permissions for wind turbine projects declined as much as 97% across the United Kingdom between 2016 and 2021. In 2023, Prime Minister Rishi Sunak had announced his pledge to lift the ban under his government. The following year, the new Labour government led by Keir Starmer lifted the ban on their first day, with a promise in their manifesto to double the country's onshore wind power by 2030, which is equivalent to 9,000 new wind turbines.

== Concept and development ==
=== Concept ===
The idea for a wind turbine owned by the Lawrence Weston community was first proposed in 2012 by local resident and retired aerospace engineer Roger Sabido, being considered by Ambition as the father of the project as a result. During an interview, Mark Pepper explained that the creation of Lawrence Weston's solar farm led to residents wanting future projects to benefit them financially, with Pepper stating this "lit the switch" to the wind turbine's development. In 2015, talks among residents where the idea of constructing a wind turbine was proposed in order to attract investment into the area.

According to Pepper, the idea for the wind turbine was to deal with a "social injustice emergency" rather than a climate emergency due to the sentiment of neglect of Lawrence Weston among residents. However, Pepper further commented that whilst it wasn't the initial motivator for the project, he hoped people would become more aware about climate action and the climate crisis as a result of the project. Initial plans for the wind turbine wanted to have it directly send power to homes in Lawrence Weston, however, these plans were dropped after it was decided that the installation of transmission lines would have made the project too costly.

=== Development ===
The project was primarily handled by Project Development Managers David Tudgey and Dr Charles R Gamble, with further assistance and support provided by ACE. The Lawrence Weston Wind Turbine project was kickstarted in 2016 after ALW received an Urban Community Energy Fund (UCEF) grant to investigate the legalities of taking on the creation of a wind turbine as well as whether there was community support for the project. Later that year, ACE began to develop an exclusivity agreement with the BCC for use of council land for the project, with ACE later entering the agreement in 2019 with one of the conditions of the agreement being that "the council not hold discussions with any third parties regarding the future of the chosen site". The agreement would then be signed in 2021.

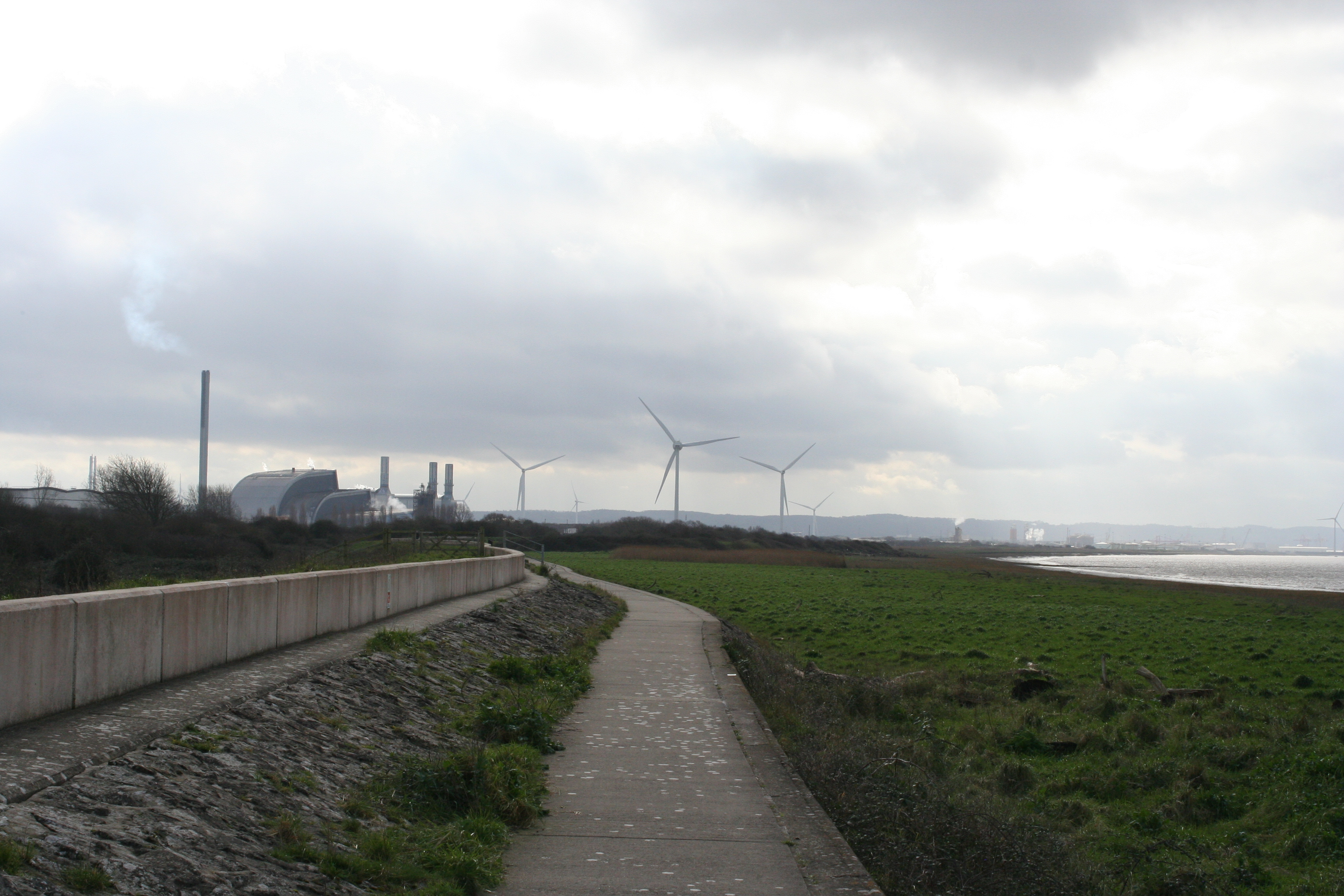
The Lawrence Weston Wind Turbine (centre) with other wind turbines in the area, with the Severnside Energy Recovery Centre and Seabank Power Station (left)

On 8 July 2020, a meeting was held by the Bristol City Council to evaluate whether to grant the planning permissions necessary for its construction. During the meeting, the wind turbine project received 69 letters of support as well as one objection, originating from the owners of the Seabank Power Station. According to the owners, the safe separation distance needed for the wind turbine was 165 metres (541 ft) (the height of the blade tip plus 10%) whereas the station's cooling tower was only 160 metres (520 ft) away, arguing that the power station was at risk from the wind turbine suffering a "catastrophic failure" and collapsing onto it. Other participants in the meeting argued against the concerns, with Royal Academy of Engineering fellow Andrew Garrad calculating that such an event was a once in 500,000 years probability and that "if you were to sit on the Seabank fence, you would be 30 times more likely to be hit by lightning than to be struck by a blade." Further comments by Roger Sabido suggested that it was "more at risk from low-flying Gloucester Old Spots than from us." The project was approved by the council and passed to Secretary of State Robert Jenrick, who by October gave approval for the wind turbine's construction.

Having obtained approval, ACE needed finance for the construction. One of the largest contributors was Thrive Renewables who, in partnership with Triodos Bank UK, loaned £4 million for the construction of the Lawrence Weston Wind Turbine. As part of its Local Energy Scheme, the West of England Combined Authority awarded the company a £500,000 capital grant towards the project, with the funds for the grant originating from the European Regional Development Fund. Other partners who contributed funds included local organisations such as the Bristol City Council, Bristol & Bath Regional Capital, members of the Society of Merchant Venturers, and charities such as the National Lottery's Big Local fund. By March the following year, the project achieved its financial goal.

Efforts to begin laying the foundations of the turbine were initially scheduled for June 2022, but delayed until the following month. A patch of land in Avonmouth owned by the BCC, situated between the Seabank Power Station and a vehicle recycling plant, was chosen as the installation area for the wind turbine, overlooking the Severn Estuary. The land was let to ACE in 2021 by Labour cabinet members for 30 years under market value, with a BCC report stating that the company would pay a £25,000 annual rent in compensation for a loss of income from the reduced flow of wind to the existing nearby turbines. However, the site caused issues throughout its construction due to its poor ground quality and smaller than recommended size suggested by Enercon. In response, the foundation plans required the use of rotary bore pilings inserted with reinforcing cages in its foundation to combat the ground quality, whereas the tower crane built to assemble the wind turbine was constructed on the same nearby access road used to bring in turbine parts to work around the site's size. Additionally, the site was recognised as being part of both a site of special scientific interest and a RAMSAR site, prompting special care needed to minimise disruption of the local habitat during construction. The laying of foundation as well as creating access to the site took around 7 months to complete.

The construction and installation of the turbine began in February 2023; using an estimated 100 tonnes of steel and 1,000 tonnes of concrete. The wind turbine parts were shipped from Enercon's facilities in Germany and were carried by lorry convoys under a police escort to the site in individual segments over three days; the segments included the three blades, the tower split into four sections, and the turbine's generator. The wind turbine was fully erected by the end of the month.

== Technical specification ==
A video of the Lawrence Weston Wind Turbine rotating

The Lawrence Weston Wind Turbine, an onshore model (E-115 E3), was manufactured by the German company Enercon, and partially designed by pioneer Andrew Garrad. At its completion, it became the tallest wind turbine in England. Its tower is 92 metres (302 ft) tall, with the structure's full height, including the blades, reaching 150 metres (490 ft). Each of its three blades is 56 metres (184 ft) long, for an effective blade sweep diameter of 115.7 metres (380 ft); the trailing-edge serrations help reduce noise. The turbine's concrete-and-steel foundation is 22 metres (72 ft) deep to anchor it during harsh weather.

According to Garrad, the turbine's size helps it maximize wind capture, explaining that "energy gathered from a wind turbine goes up with the square of the diameter, so if you double the diameter, you get four times the energy."

The turbine has a rated wind speed of 13.2 m/s (30 mph), with cut-in and cut-out wind speeds of 2.5 m/s (6 mph) and 34 m/s (76 mph), respectively. The structure can withstand winds of 70 m/s (157 mph) without sustaining damage. The turbine has a peak power output of 4.25 megawatts and is capable of producing 10.9 gigawatt-hours annually, enough energy to supply around 3,000 to 3,500 homes.

The total cost of installation for the Lawrence Weston Wind Turbine was around £5.5 million, according to the West of England Combined Authority.

== Outcomes ==
The Lawrence Weston Wind Turbine adopts an "'export' model" where the energy it generates is sold to the National Grid. The surplus revenue generated through the turbine, in addition to other energy facilities developed by ACE, is then reinvested back into the community through assets and activities, such as developing affordable housing as well as establishing a training centre for renewable energy skills. One such development where the turbine's revenue helped was the revival of a local community that was previously closed, estimated to have cost around £2.1 million. It is estimated that over £100,000 per year of surplus income would be generated and be donated to the community through ALW, with the first of these annual payments made in February 2025.

In April 2024, Bristolian energy supplier OVO Energy partnered with ACE. Users of OVO services who own a smart meter in the BS11 postcode area would be notified by text that a given day was considered a "Windy Day", which is when the turbine would generate excess energy, with the notification encouraging them to use energy. In return, the customers would be rewarded credits on their OVO accounts to deduct money from their energy bills.

In an interview with Windpower Monthly, Tudgey and Gamble stated that the work they developed with Lawrence Weston allowed them to create a system for creating community wind turbines, which they called the "Sustainable Innovative Financial Foundations for Turbines (SIFFFT)" model, that they hoped to build on and replicate in future projects. They added that they wanted the SIFFFT model to spread beyond the West of England, and that they believed the region would "become a beacon as to how communities can be genuinely levelled up through a just energy transition." When asked for advice for other communities who wanted to start up something similar due to the interest in ALW, Pepper stated to "just ask people what they want", adding that ALW started by training residents to go door-to-door to gather feedback by taking a survey every three years. In February 2026, Secretary of State for Energy Security and Net Zero and MP Ed Miliband announced the Local Power Plan, which would be used to invest up to £1 billion in locally owned clean energy projects. During the announcement, ministers including Miliband mentioned the Lawrence Weston Wind Turbine project as inspiration for the plan, using it as an example of the transformative power of community-based clean power generation.

According to both The Times and The Progress Playbook, the Lawrence Weston Wind Turbine was the only onshore wind turbine erected in the United Kingdom in 2023. However, other outlets such as Sky News have stated that it was one of two onshore wind turbines that began operating that year. In 2022, the project won an award for "Finance & Innovation" at the Community Energy Awards, which were hosted by Community Energy England.

== Gallery ==
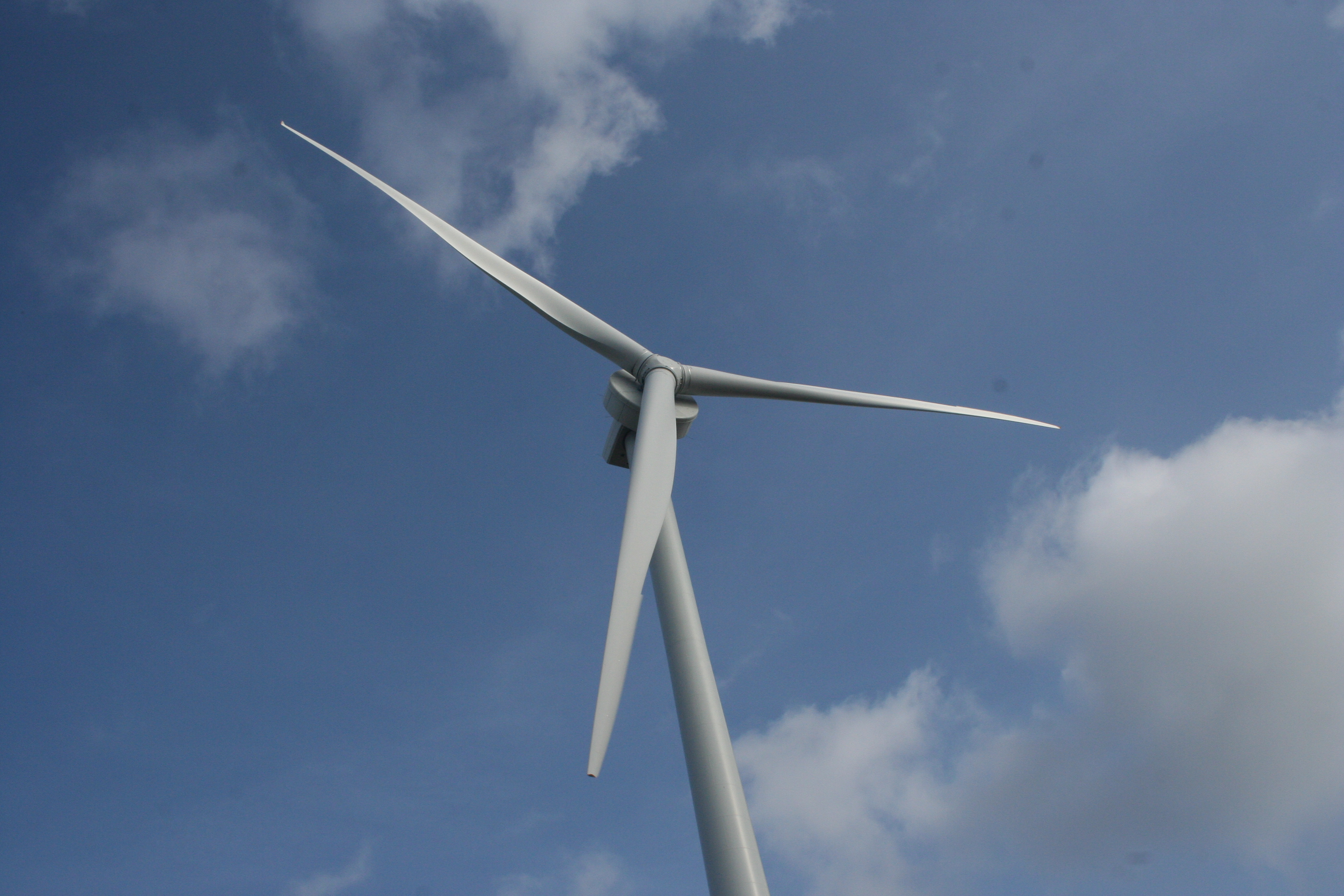
A close-up of the turbine's blades

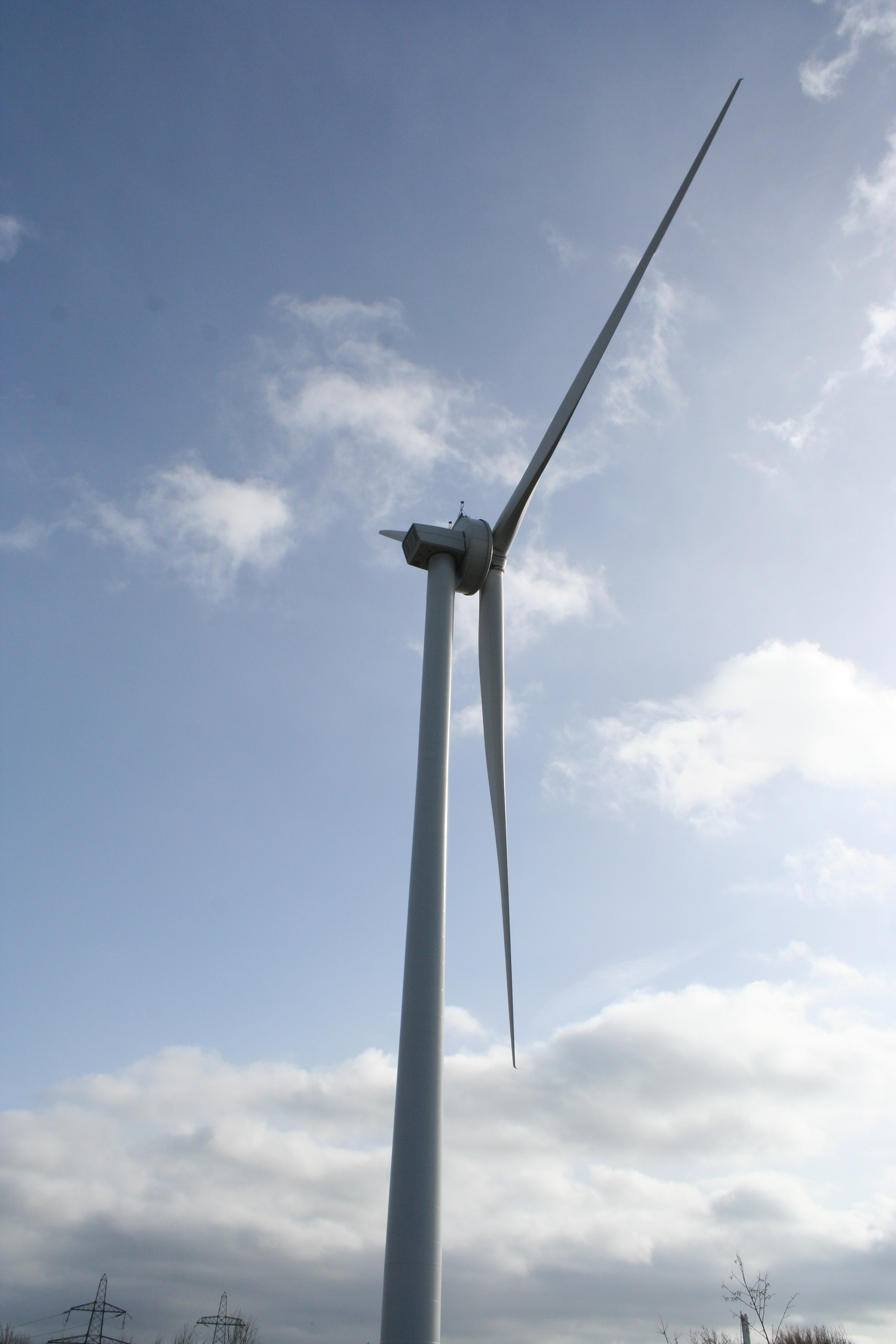
Viewed from the side

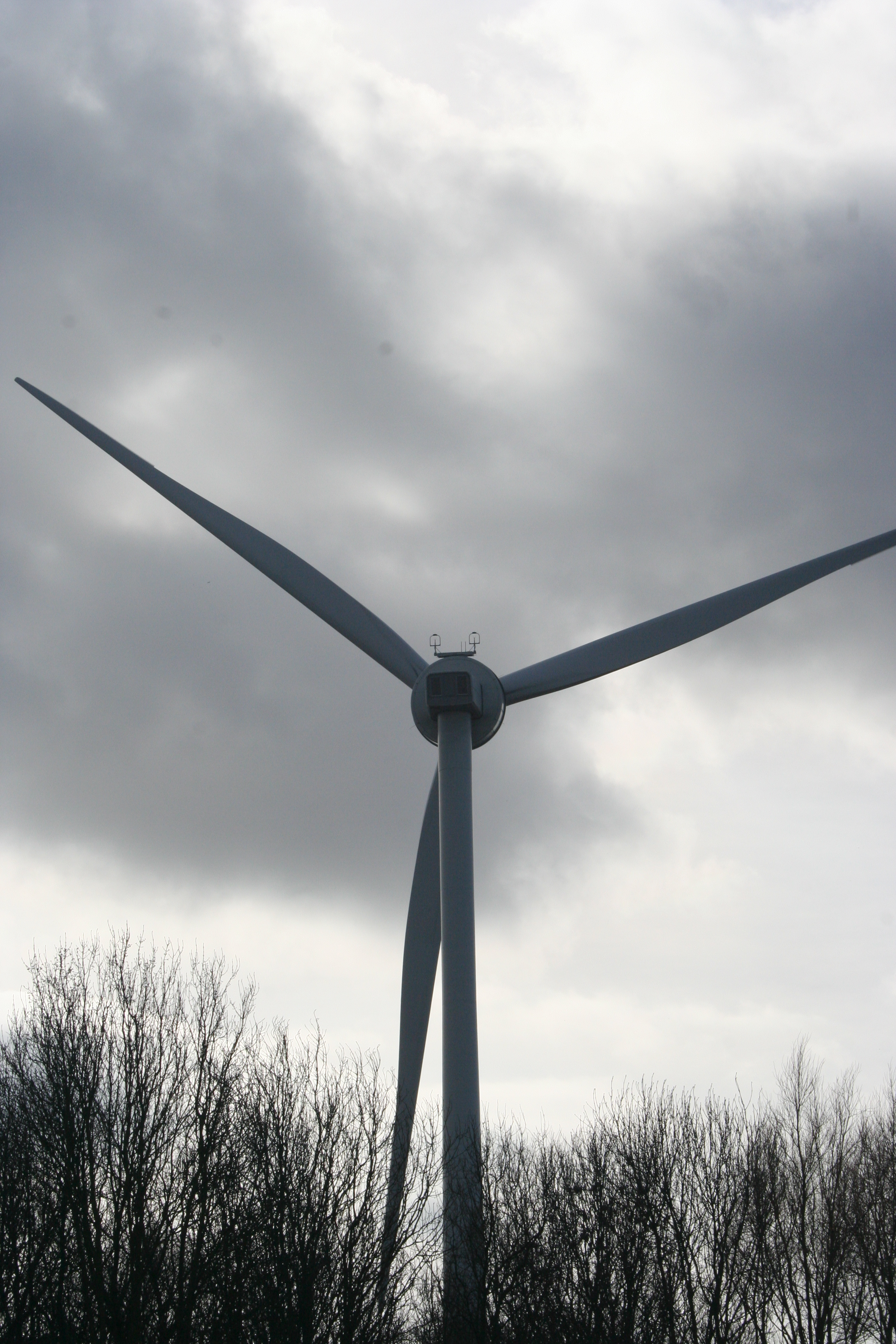
Back view of the turbine

== See also ==
- List of onshore wind farms in England
- List of tallest structures in the United Kingdom
- Wind power in the United Kingdom
- Similar individual wind turbines:
  - Growian, a publicly funded wind turbine that operated from 1983 to 1987 in Schleswig-Holstein, Germany
  - Hama Wing, a wind power plant commissioned in 2007 to supply electricity for the residents of Kanagawa-ku, Yokohama, Japan
  - Smith–Putnam wind turbine, a wind turbined commissioned in 1941 in Castleton, Vermont, US, and was the world's tallest wind turbine until 1979
