= Holmside =

Village in County Durham, England

Coordinates: 54.835°N 1.664°W

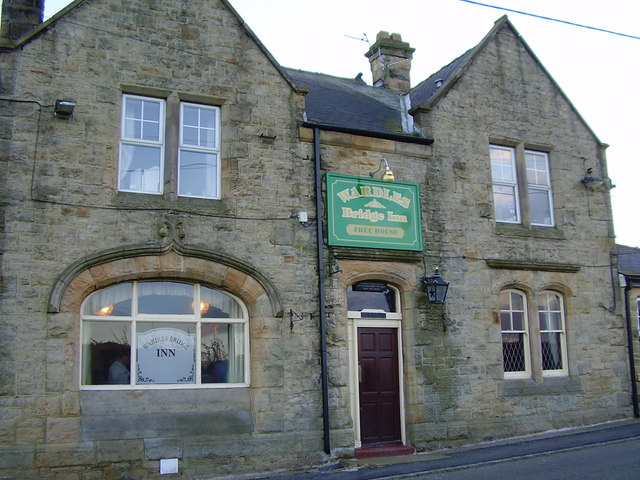
Location

Holmside is a village in County Durham, in England. It is situated to the north-west of Sacriston.

The village has a 5.5 MW wind farm, Holmside Hall Wind Farm, which became operational in May 2004 and consists of two 60 m (200 ft) high wind turbines.
