= Emberton =

Civil parish in the City of Milton Keynes, England

Coordinates: 52.136°N 0.708°W

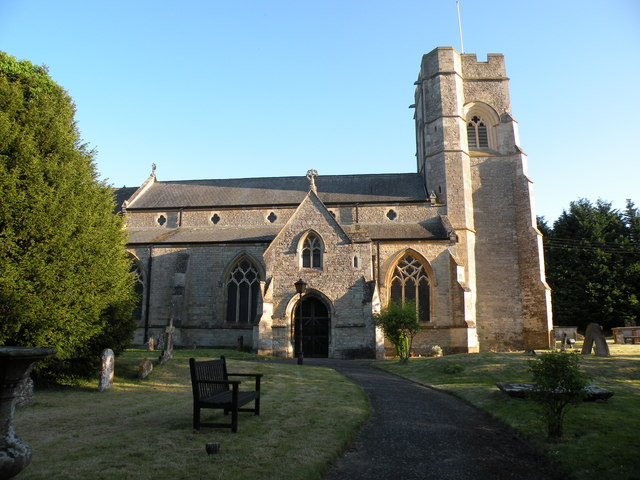
- All Saints Church

- Location within Buckinghamshire
- Interactive map of Emberton
- Population: 623 (2021 census)
- OS grid reference: SP885495
- Civil parish: Emberton
- District: City of Milton Keynes
- Unitary authority: Milton Keynes City Council
- Ceremonial county: Buckinghamshire
- Region: South East
- Country: England
- Sovereign state: United Kingdom
- Post town: OLNEY
- Postcode district: MK46
- Dialling code: 01234
- Police: Thames Valley
- Fire: Buckinghamshire
- Ambulance: South Central
- UK Parliament: Milton Keynes North

Emberton is a village and civil parish in the unitary authority area of the City of Milton Keynes, in Buckinghamshire, England. The village is near the borders with Northamptonshire and Bedfordshire, just to the south of Olney, 4 miles (6.4 km) north of Newport Pagnell, and 7 miles (11 km) north-east of Central Milton Keynes.

The parish of Emberton was formed from three villages that were annexed together for ecclesiastical purposes in 1650: Petsoe, Ekeney and Emberton. Today nothing remains of Ekeney and Petsoe only exists as a hamlet called Petsoe End.

The village name is an Old English word and means Eanbeorht's Farm. In the Domesday Book of 1086 the village was called Ambretone; in manorial records of 1227 it was Emberdestone, and by the fourteenth century it was Embirtone.

In the twelfth century, the manor was owned by the Paynel (sic) family of Newport Pagnell. The parish church is dedicated to All Saints.

Although there are no shops in the village, there is a village pub called the Bell and Bear on the site of the old Bell Inn. The former Bear Inn was previously situated near Petsoe where the A509 now runs.

== Clock tower ==
At the heart of the village is a clock tower, which was restored in 1972 and then renovated with the help of a grant from the Heritage Lottery Fund. This poem is engraved on a panel below the clock:

Time's on the wing, how swift he speeds his way,
Hastening to sink in one continuous day,
Pause passing traveller, "what thy destiny?"
When death unveils a vast eternity
Live then to Christ, in Christ eternal gain
No Christ, No Hope, but everlasting pain.

== Nearby geographic features ==
Hollington Wood, a small patch of ancient woodland, lies about a mile south-east of Emberton.

The Milton Keynes Wind Farm is located 2 miles east of Emberton.

There is also an 18ha solar farm at Rectory Farm, Petsoe

== Notable people ==
Dan Wheldon (1978–2011), one of the biggest names in American motorsport, hailed from Emberton. Though relatively unknown in his native Britain, Wheldon became a star in the United States after winning both the IndyCar championship and the Indy 500 in 2005 and 2011. He was killed in a high-speed crash involving 15 cars in the 2011 IndyCar season finale held in Las Vegas.

== Emberton Country Park ==
Country Park

Emberton Country Park is a 200-acre (81 ha; 0.81 km^{2}) Country park on the river Great Ouse. The original gravel works site where the modern park is located was transformed by Milton Keynes City Council in 1965 into a country park and is the only one in the Milton Keynes UA to be designated as such, and one of five in Buckinghamshire. (Note: The others are Black Park, Langley Park and Denham Park.)

There are five lakes and a (touring) caravan park within the park area.
