= Hollington Wood =

Woodland in Buckinghamshire, England

Coordinates: 52.127903°N 0.691431°W

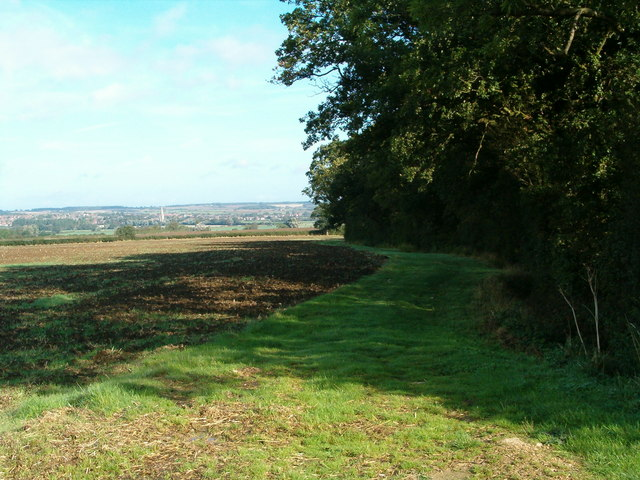
- The edge of Hollington Wood, with Olney in the background

- Location within Buckinghamshire
- Civil parish: Emberton
- Unitary authority: Milton Keynes
- Ceremonial county: Buckinghamshire
- Region: South East
- Country: England
- Sovereign state: United Kingdom
- Post town: OLNEY
- Postcode district: MK46
- Police: Thames Valley
- Fire: Buckinghamshire
- Ambulance: South Central
- UK Parliament: Milton Keynes North

Hollington Wood is a small patch of ancient woodland about a mile south-east of the village of Emberton near Olney in the City of Milton Keynes, Buckinghamshire, England.
