= Winscales =

Hamlet and civil parish in Cumbria, England

Coordinates: 54.62°N 3.51°W

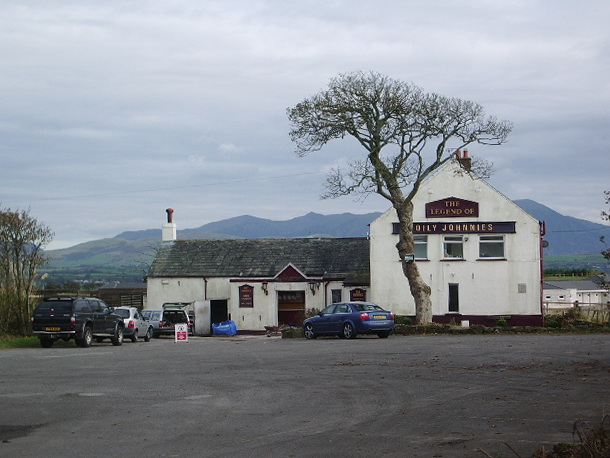
The pub, "Oily Johnnies", in Winscales

Winscales is a hamlet and civil parish in the Cumberland district, Cumbria, England, south west of Workington. In the 2011 census it had a population of 237.

The parish is bordered by Workington to the west, Great Clifton and Little Clifton to the north east, Dean to the south east, and Distington, to the south. The A595 road and A596 road pass through the parish.

There is a parish council, the lowest tier of local government.

Winscales Moor Wind Farm is in the north of the parish, and there are industrial developments. The parish council describes the parish as "primarily industrial with few residential properties".

In Winscales hamlet there is a pub with the unusual name of "Oily Johnnies" or "Oily's". It was previously the Royal Oak but was renamed after a previous landlord who sold paraffin oil from a shed beside the pub.

== Listed buildings ==
As of 2017 there are two listed buildings in the parish, both at grade II.
