= Burton Latimer =

Town in Northamptonshire, England

Coordinates: 52.365°N 0.678°W

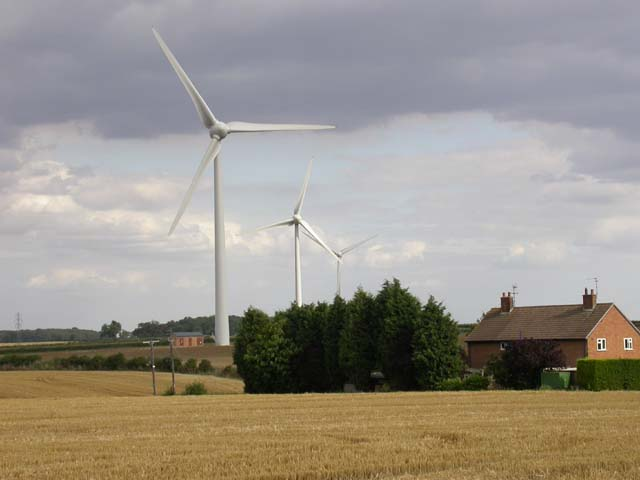
- Burton Wold Wind Farm

- Location within Northamptonshire
- Population: 10,444 (2021 census)
- OS grid reference: SP901749
- Unitary authority: North Northamptonshire
- Ceremonial county: Northamptonshire
- Region: East Midlands
- Country: England
- Sovereign state: United Kingdom
- Post town: KETTERING
- Postcode district: NN15
- Dialling code: 01536
- Police: Northamptonshire
- Fire: Northamptonshire
- Ambulance: East Midlands
- UK Parliament: Kettering

Burton Latimer is a town in North Northamptonshire, England, approximately 3.1 miles (5.0 km) southeast of Kettering and 4.5 miles north of Wellingborough. At the 2021 census, its population was 10,444.

== History ==
The name Burton derives from the Old English burhtūn meaning 'settlement at the fort'.

Burton (Latimer) appears in three entries in the Domesday Book of 1086.

Tenant-in-chief and Lord in 1086: Guy of Raimbeaucourt. Households: 21 villagers. 18 smallholders. 1 slave. Ploughland: 14 ploughlands (tre). 3 lord's plough teams. 9 men's plough teams. Other resources: 3.0 lord's lands. Meadow 20 acres. Woodland 0.5 acres. 2 mills, value 0.8. Phillimore reference: 41,1

Tenant-in-chief in 1086: Bishop Geoffrey of Coutances. Lord in 1086: Walkelin of Harrowden. Households: 9 villagers. 5 smallholders. 1 slave. 1 female slave. Ploughland: 5 ploughlands (land for). 2 lord's plough teams. 3.5 men's plough teams. Other resources: Meadow 15 acres. Phillimore reference: 4,9

Tenant-in-chief in 1086: Bishop Geoffrey of Coutances. Lord in 1086 Richard Households: 3 villagers. 1 smallholder. 1 slave. Ploughland: 3 ploughlands (land for). 1 lord's plough teams. 1 men's plough teams. Other resources: Meadow 6 acres. Phillimore reference: 4,12

The second part of the town's name is derived from the le Latimer family who lived there in the 13th century. The first part of the name usually means fortified farmstead or farmstead near a fortification. Before the arrival of the Latimers, it was known as 'Burtone'.

=== Industrial history ===
Burton Latimer grew in the 19th century around the ironstone quarrying, clothing and footwear industries. A watermill used for grinding corn was converted and used at various times in the 19th century for the manufacture of silk and worsted and for carpet-weaving, followed by its conversion to a steam mill to make chicory, mustard, animal foodstuffs and flour. The mill was acquired in the 1930s and became the home of Weetabix, which is also produced in Corby.

Ironstone quarrying began in about 1872 to the north of the town, to the south of the Kettering, Thrapston and Huntingdon Railway. More quarries were started in the west in the vicinity of Polwell Lane and more extensively on the east side of the town. The last pits ceased production of iron ore in 1921. The ore was taken by 3 ft (914 mm) gauge tramways to the mainline railways. At first the tramways were worked by horses but steam locomotives were introduced in 1891. The quarry near Polwell Lane was re-opened in 1925 for the extraction of ganister. The tramway to the main railway from this quarry was operated by small diesel locomotives. The quarry ceased production in 1983.

By 1885, the first four clothing factories had opened, followed in 1898 by the first shoe factory, and Burton grew rapidly to become a small, thriving light-industrial town.

By 2000 the town's new bypass and the building of the A14 made the town attractive again as a manufacturing and distribution centre. High-profile national firms like Versalift, Alpro Soya and Abbeyboard have based themselves on the north side of town.

In the 2020s, more manufacturing and distribution centres have been erected on the north side of Burton Latimer, such as the recently completed establishment of 'Symmetry Park' and the other warehouses built at the Kettering Gateway.

== Landmarks ==
A notable building in the town is the parish church, dedicated to St Mary the Virgin, which was consecrated in 1147. The Norman church was remodelled and added to at various times up to about 1310. It was restored and the tower rebuilt in 1866. It contains a number of medieval wall paintings, a 15th-century chancel screen and some monumental brasses. The oldest of the latter is located between the south arcade and chancel screen and features the coat of arms of the Boyville family; it was almost certainly placed there in the early 16th century to commemorate Richard Boyville, his wife Gresyll and their children.

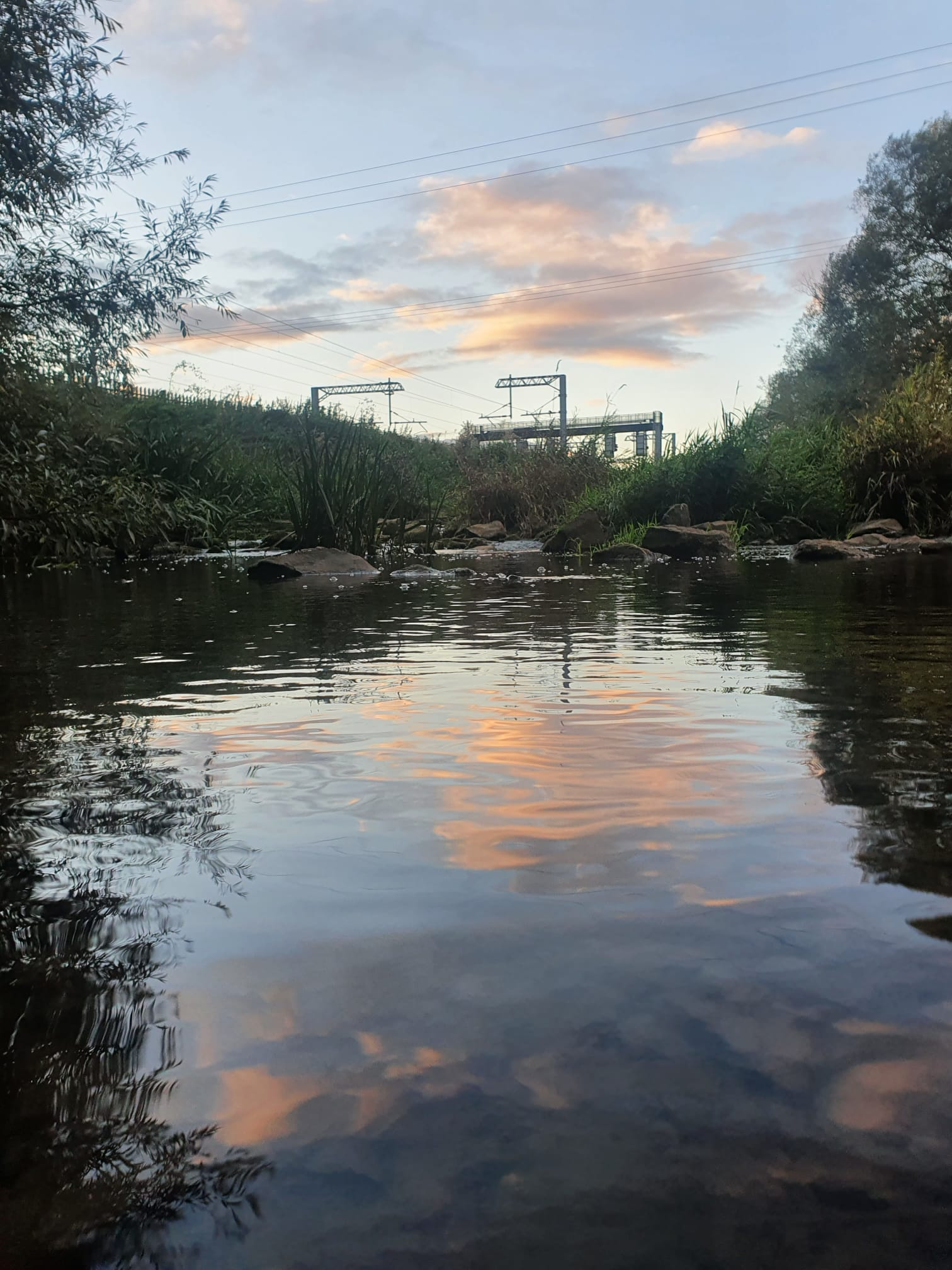
The River Ise in the Burton Latimer Pocket Park

The war memorial, currently located at the corner of Church Street and High Street was erected in 1922. It has moved locations a couple times but now remains where it was first erected.

The town is home to the land-owning Harpur family, who have owned the Grade I listed Burton Latimer Hall since 1760, together with other land around the town. Burton Latimer Hall was built using the same light-toned stone as used in buildings in the north-east part of the town. It is rumoured that a secret tunnel connects Burton Latimer Hall and the nearby St Mary’s Church, but it has never been found.

There is a Jacobean House, built in 1622, which was formerly a school. On the front of this house, a stone tablet states: "This house was built 1622 the freschoole was founded by thomas burbanke and margaret his wife 1587 memoria. ivsti. benedicta. pro".

Burton Latimer Pocket Park was established on the riverbank in 1995. The 11-acre plot of land houses many different species of animals and is a popular place for recreational fishing. A duck race and fête is held at the park each June.

== Modern day ==
Burton Latimer is the location of the first wind farm in Northamptonshire. Burton Wold Wind Farm, operated by Your Energy, has 10 turbines, producing enough electricity to power around 8,500 homes annually (around a quarter of Kettering Borough's households). The wind farm is the largest inland wind farm. Burton Latimer is home to the Weetabix food company, Shield aluminium, and several group undertakings and a Wm Morrisons supermarket distribution centre, which are major local employers.

In addition to the ancient St. Mary's Church (built in 1187), there are four churches in the town. The other three are: Burton Latimer Methodist Church, Burton Latimer Baptist Church, and St. Nicholas Owen RC Church.

There is the Britannia Working Men's Club, the Olde Victoria and a band club. There is a Conservative club, and a civic centre, as well as a community centre.

The Millennium Gardens, constructed in 2000, are located on the corner of the junction of the High street and Churchill Way.

A medical centre (Burton Latimer Medical Centre), has a surgery in the town, as well as one in Finedon. The medical centre was completed in 2004, to replace the previous centre, which had been built in 1970. It has doctors (general practitioners), and nurse practitioners. The pharmacy (in Burton Latimer) is next to the centre.

A wood on the western edge of the town leads down to the River Ise and across to the village of Isham.

== Governance ==
Burton Latimer has a town council consisting of 12 members, a mayor and deputy mayor. The town is governed by North Northamptonshire Council, following the abolition of the borough and district councils in Northamptonshire. Northamptonshire County Council was also abolished on 31 March 2021 and the existing authorities were replaced with two new unitary authorities on 1 April 2021- North Northamptonshire Council in the north and east of Northamptonshire and West Northamptonshire Council in the south and west of Northamptonshire. At Westminster, Burton Latimer is part of the Kettering constituency.

== Transport ==
It is just south of the junction of the A6 and A14. The A6 bypass, which is 2 miles long, was completed in October 1991.

Buses run through Burton Latimer. These include the 48 and 50 which end up at Wellingborough and Bedford respectively.

Isham and Burton Latimer railway station served the town between 1857 and 1950. Now the nearest railway station is at Kettering.

== Sport ==
Burton Latimer has a non-league football team, Burton Park Wanderers F.C., who play at Latimer Park. Since 2013, Latimer Park has also been the home ground of Kettering Town F.C.

Burton Latimer has an amateur cricket team, Burton Latimer Town Cricket Club, who play at Hall Field, on Kettering Road. It has three male XI sides, and one female XI side. The first, second and third male XI sides play in Divisions 1, 6 and 11 of the Northamptonshire Cricket League respectively.

The town also has a bowls club, as well as various sports clubs, based at various community centres. There are tennis courts, by the recreation ground.

== Media ==
Local news and television programmes are provided by BBC East and ITV Anglia. Television signals are received from the Sandy Heath TV transmitter.

Local radio stations are BBC Radio Northampton, Heart East, Smooth East Midlands (formerly Connect FM), and Shire Sounds, a community based radio station that broadcast from Kettering.

The town is served by the local newspaper, Northamptonshire Evening Telegraph.

== Education ==
The town has two main primary schools: Meadowside Primary School, and St. Mary's C of E Primary School. The town has no secondary schools. The Latimer Arts College is located in nearby Barton Seagrave, close to Kettering.

== Twin Towns ==
Burton Latimer has a town twinning agreement with:

- Altendiez, Germany since 1987
- Castelnuovo Magra, Italy since 2002

== Notable residents ==
- Charley Hull, professional golfer
- Humphrey Henchman, bishop of London
