= Listed buildings in Felliscliffe =

Felliscliffe is a civil parish in the county of North Yorkshire, England. It contains ten listed buildings that are recorded in the National Heritage List for England. All the listed buildings are designated at Grade II, the lowest of the three grades, which is applied to "buildings of national importance and special interest". The parish contains the settlements of Kettlesing and Swincliffe and the surrounding countryside, and the listed buildings consist of houses and farmhouses, a barn, two mileposts and a war memorial.

== Buildings ==
| Name and location | Photograph | Date | Notes |
|---|---|---|---|
| West Syke Manor; 54.01214°N 1.64140°W | — | Early 17th century | The house has an earlier timber framed core, it was later encased in gritstone, and has a stone slate roof with a raised left verge and a shaped kneeler. There are two storeys and three bays. The doorway has a moulded quoined surround and a four-centred arched lintel. The windows are recessed chamfered and mullioned, some with hood moulds. On one sill is an inscription. |
| Swincliffe Side Farmhouse; 54.01855°N 1.62493°W | — | Mid 17th century | The farmhouse is in stone with quoins and a purple slate roof. There are two storeys and three bays. The central doorway has a chamfered quoined surround and a shallow triangular doorhead, and the windows are mullioned. |
| Cote Syke Farmhouse; 54.01609°N 1.62080°W | — | 1702 | The house is in gritstone with quoins, a purple slate roof on the main range, and a stone slate roof on the right bay, with bulbous kneelers and coped gables. There are two storeys and three bays, and a single-storey bay on the right. The doorway has a moulded quoined surround, and a moulded, initialled and dated lintel, over which is a cornice. Most of the windows are recessed, chamfered and mullioned, those in the ground floor with hood moulds. There is a single-light window in an architrave, under which is an inscribed plaque. In the right bay is a doorway with chamfered jambs, the chamfer continued across the lintel as an ogee curve. |
| Ivy House Farmhouse; 54.00547°N 1.66008°W | — | 1707 | A house and outbuildings, later combined, in gritstone, with quoins, and roofs of purple slate and stone slate with coped gables. There are two storeys and three bays. The doorway has a moulded quoined surround and a dated and initialled lintel with a triangular soffit, and to the right is a doorway with a moulded surround converted into a window. In the ground floor are recessed chamfered mullioned windows, and the upper floor contains square windows in plain surrounds and a circular window to the right. |
| Roadside barn 54.01908°N 1.63187°W | — | Early 18th century | The barn is in gritstone, with quoins, and a stone slate roof with bulbous kneelers and gable copings. There is a single storey and three bays. In the centre is a cart entrance with quoined jambs and a chamfered cambered arch. To the right is a blocked doorway with quoined jambs and a large lintel, and to the left is a row of slit vents. |
| Kettlesing Grange; 54.00661°N 1.65967°W | — | 1731 | A house with outbuildings from an earlier date, in gritstone, the house with a roof of purple slate, and the outbuilding with a stone slate roof, and with bulbous kneelers and gable copings. The house has two storeys and three bays, a plinth, quoins, and a string course. The doorway has a moulded quoined surround and a dated and initialled lintel with a triangular soffit. In both floors are recessed chamfered mullioned windows. The outbuildings have a single storey and five bays, and contain mullioned windows, garage doorways and another door. Inside there is a raised cruck. |
| Cragg Hall and outbuildings 54.01030°N 1.65160°W | — | 1750 | The house and outbuildings are in gritstone with quoins and roofs of purple slate and stone slate, coped gables and shaped kneelers. The house has two storeys and four bays. On the front is a blocked doorway with a large dated and initialled lintel, and an inserted doorway with tie-stone jambs. In the ground floor are mullioned windows, the upper floor contains sash windows, and all are recessed with chamfered surrounds. To the right is a four-bay barn and a lean-to cart shed. They contain a segmental-arched cart entrance with a quoined surround and a keystone, and doorways with plain surrounds. There are external steps on the house and the barn. |
| Milepost at SE 2096 5612; 54.00059°N 1.68237°W | | Early to mid 19th century | The milepost on the north side of Skipton Road (A59 road) has a cast iron plate bolted on to a gritstone block. It has a triangular plan and a rounded head. On the head is inscribed "SKIPTON & KNARESBOROUGH ROAD" and "FELLISCLIFFE", on the left face are the distances to Harrogate and Knaresborough, and on the right face to Skipton. |
| Milepost at SE 2242 5618; 54.00128°N 1.65909°W | | Mid 19th century | The milepost on the north side of Skipton Road (A59 road) has a cast iron plate bolted on to a gritstone block, and is about 1 metre (3 ft 3 in) high. It has a triangular plan and a rounded head. On the head is inscribed "SKIPTON & KNARESBOROUGH ROAD", on the left face are the distances to Harrogate and Knaresborough, and on the right face to Skipton. |
| War memorial 54.01163°N 1.65482°W | — | 1920 | The war memorial is in an enclosure by a road junction. It is in stone, and consists of a short obelisk on a square base and a two-step plinth. On the memorial is a square plaque with the names of those lost in the two World Wars. |
