= Milton Keynes wind farm =

Wind farm in Buckinghamshire, England

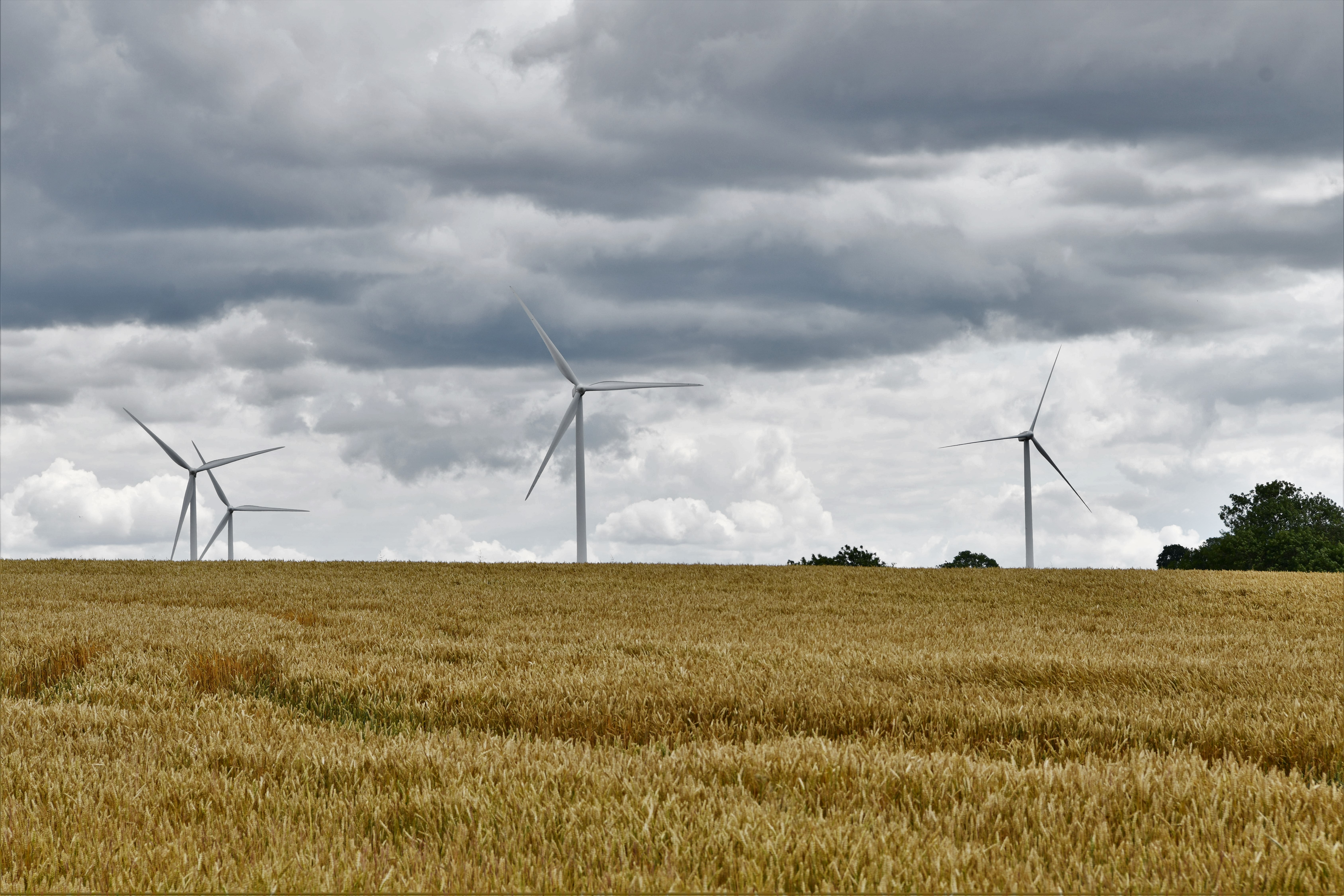
- View in 2023
- Country: England
- Location: City of Milton Keynes, Buckinghamshire
- Coordinates: 52°8′10.4″N 0°39′52″W

External links
- Website: Official website

Milton Keynes wind farm is located 2 miles east of Emberton in the City of Milton Keynes, Buckinghamshire, UK. It was developed by Your Energy and is owned by Mistral Windfarms. The wind farm comprises seven turbines 125 m to the blade tip, and has a total installed capacity of 14 MW. They were expected to produce approximately 38 GWh of electricity per year.

== Development and Construction ==
A planning application was submitted in August 2006 to Milton Keynes City Council by Your Energy Ltd, and was granted planning permission in January 2008.

The decision was challenged and upheld three separate times during 2008 by objectors to the project. It was the first wind farm challenge to go as high as the House of Lords.

The main contractor for civil and electrical works was Morrison Construction, part of the Galliford Try Group. Danish company Vestas supplied the turbines, Vestas V90-2MW machines. Engineering Renewables Ltd were Project Managers for construction and operations.

The turbines were delivered to the Port of Hull, where they continued their journey to Milton Keynes by road. Construction commenced in November 2009 and was completed by September 2010.

== Community Benefit Fund ==
£190,000 will be contributed towards community projects over the life of the wind farm. An additional £50,000 is being directed toward improving the biodiversity of the surrounding area and local footpath networks over the first five years.

A similar fund is in place at Burton Wold Wind Farm, also developed by Your Energy Ltd.

== See also ==
- List of onshore wind farms in the United Kingdom
