= Ogden, West Yorkshire =

Village in West Yorkshire, England

Coordinates: 53.774598°N 1.894827°W

Ogden
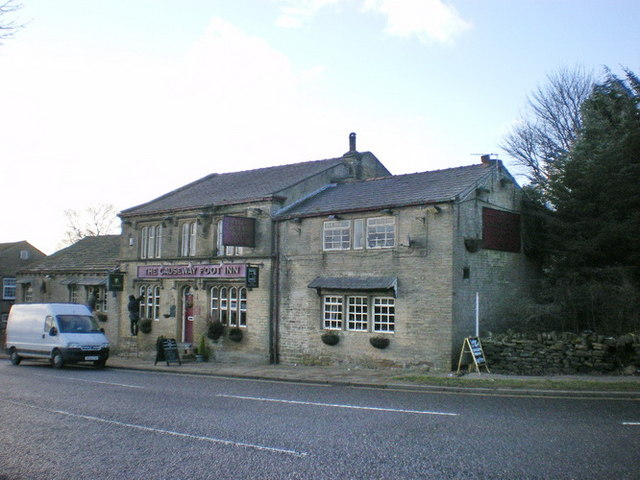
- The Causeway Foot Inn

- Location within West Yorkshire
- OS grid reference: SE070309
- Metropolitan borough: Calderdale
- Metropolitan county: West Yorkshire
- Region: Yorkshire and the Humber
- Country: England
- Sovereign state: United Kingdom
- Post town: HALIFAX
- Postcode district: HX2
- Police: West Yorkshire
- Fire: West Yorkshire
- Ambulance: Yorkshire

Ogden in West Yorkshire, England, is a small hamlet 5.0 miles (8 km) north of Halifax. The hamlet falls within the Calderdale Ward of Illingworth and Mixenden. Its most recognisable landmarks are Ovenden Moor wind farm, which can be seen from as far as 35 miles (56 km) away on a clear day; a golf course, which offers views of the surrounding moorland; and Ogden reservoir, around which are footpaths for visitors to walk and view the local wildlife.

== See also ==
- Wind power in the United Kingdom
