= North Steads Wind Farm =

Wind farm in Northumberland, England

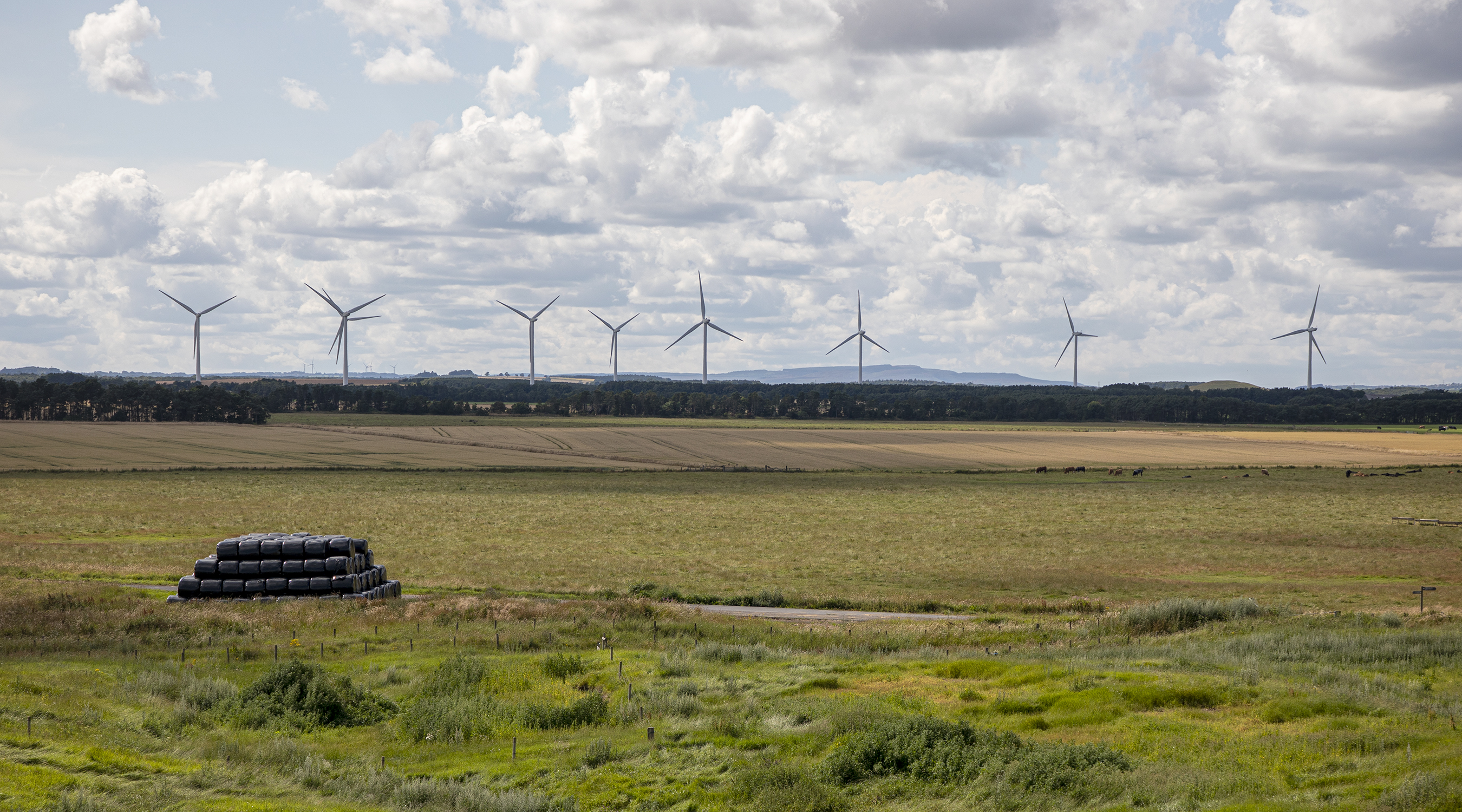
- North Steads Wind Farm from Druridge Bay
- Country: England
- Location: Widdrington, Northumberland
- Coordinates: 55.266°N 1.618°W
- Status: Operational
- Construction began: August 2015
- Commission date: 29 June 2016
- Owner: Ventient Energy

Wind farm
- Type: Onshore
- Site usage: Forestry, farmland
- Hub height: 260 feet (80 m)
- Rotor diameter: 302 feet (92 m)
- Site elevation: 98 feet (30 m)

Power generation
- Units operational: 9 x 2.05 mw
- Make and model: Senvion MM92
- Nameplate capacity: 18.45 megawatts

External links
- Website: Official website

North Steads Wind Farm is an onshore electricity generating site west of Widdrington in Northumberland, England. The site was developed on old coal opencast workings and has nine turbines delivering over 18 megawatts of power per year.

== History ==
Consent for the wind farm was granted in 2012, though construction of the site did not start until August 2015, one month after Infinis (later renamed as Ventient Energy) acquired the site from Peel Energy. The original planning permission sought was for 13 units, but this was reduced to nine operational units at North Steads, as four already existed at another site nearby called Sisters Wind Farm. (Note: The former opencast coalmining venture on the site was known as Sisters, from where the name came for the wind farm.) The site was commissioned in June 2016, with the name North Steads Wind Farm, after the local community campaigned for the name to be changed from Blue Sky Forest, which Peel Energy developed the site as. North Steads was developed on the former coal opencasting site of Maiden Hall and Steadsburn, half of which had ceased coaling operations in 2006, though the 170-acre (69-hectare) Steadsburn site was still blasting rock in 2009.

The site consists of nine turbines, each with a rating of just over 2 megawatts, and at a height of 260 feet (80 m). The length of each blade is 148 feet (45 m) with an overall diameter of 302 feet (92 m). (Note: This equates to the total height of the turbine blades reaching 410 feet (125 m).) The output of the site is rated as 18.45 megawatts, which is enough to power over 11,700 homes annually.

Six of the turbines are surrounded by woodland (North Steads Plantation), and the three southernmost, are on arable land. The site averages about 98 feet (30 m) above sea level, and is bounded to the east by Steads Burn.

== See also ==
- List of onshore wind farms in the United Kingdom
