= Trimdon Grange Wind Farm =

Wind farm in County Durham, England

- Country: England, United Kingdom
- Location: near Trimdon Grange, County Durham
- Coordinates: 54.7130°N 1.41944°W
- Status: Operational
- Commission date: October 2008
- Owner: EDF Energy
- Site elevation: 446 ft

Power generation
- Units operational: 4 × 1.3 MW
- Make and model: Nordex: N60
- Nameplate capacity: 5.2 MW

Trimdon Grange Wind Farm is an onshore wind farm near Trimdon Grange, County Durham, England. Commissioned in October 2008 it consists of four 1.3 MW Nordex N60 turbines giving a total capacity of 5.2 MW. It was developed by EDF and is operated by Cumbria Wind Farms.

The proposed location of the wind farm caused controversy in 2004 when an agent of Tony Blair, then Prime Minister, wrote to a local action group, Trimdon Area Group Against Wind Farms, claiming that the site was unsuitable. The location is about one mile from Tony Blair's old constituency house.
