= Ovenden Moor Wind Farm =

Wind farm in West Yorkshire, England

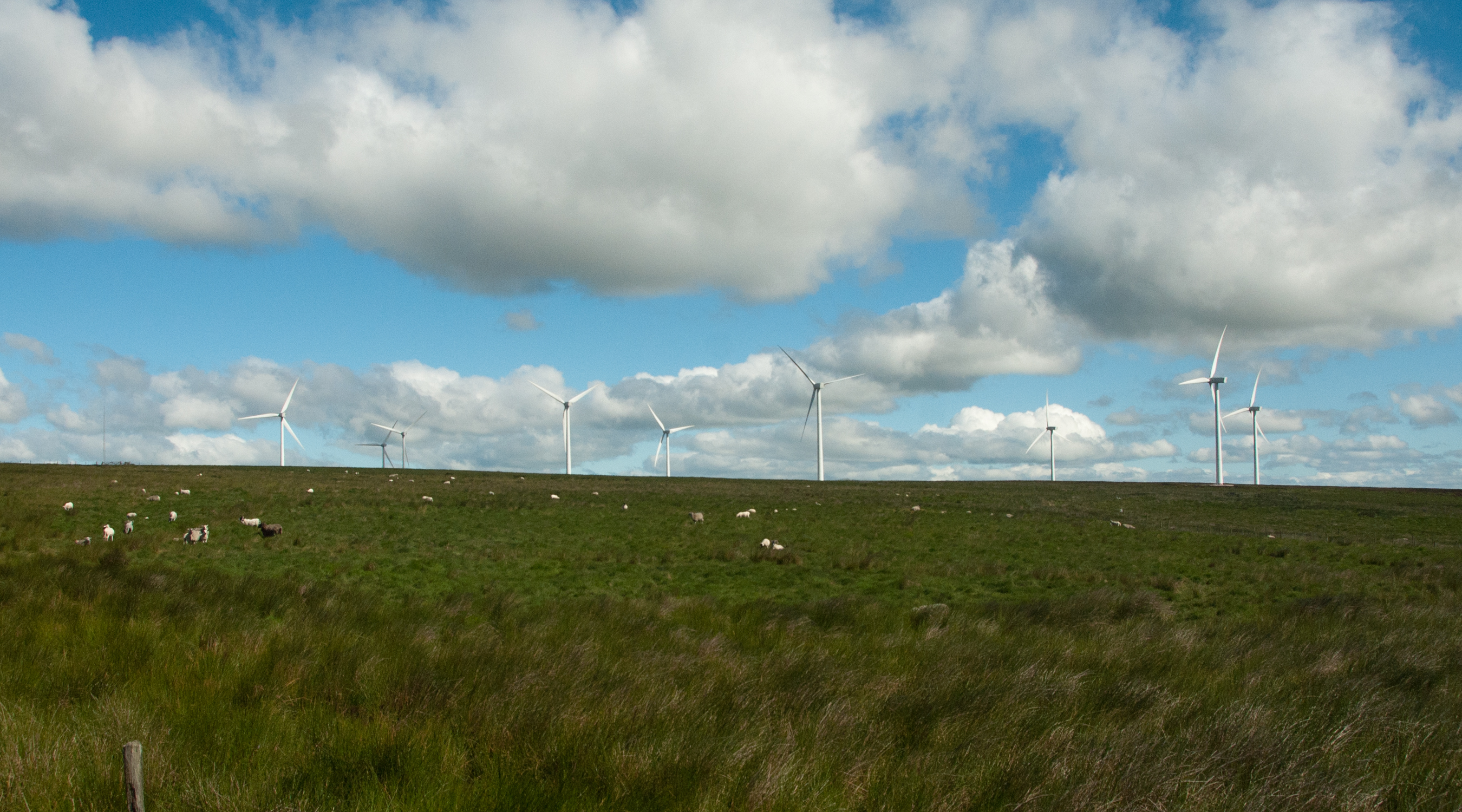
- The uprated windfarm at Ovenden Moor
- Country: England
- Location: Halifax
- Coordinates: 53°46′32″N 1°56′13″W
- Status: Operational
- Construction began: 1992; 2016 (Note: The first windfarm was constructed in 1992/1993 and decommissioned in 2015)
- Commission date: 1993; 2017
- Construction cost: £12 million
- Owner: Yorkshire Wind Power Limited

Wind farm
- Type: Onshore
- Hub height: 370 feet (110 m) (second generation)
- Site elevation: 1,440 feet (440 m)

Power generation
- Make and model: Gamesa G80-2MW
- Units planned: Ten
- Units cancelled: One
- Annual net output: 49 GWh

External links
- Commons: Related media on Commons

Ovenden Moor Wind Farm is a wind powered electricity generating site in England. Ovenden Moor is located north of Halifax and west of Bradford in West Yorkshire. The site was opened in 1993 with 23 turbines, but these were later removed in favour of larger turbines but with 14 fewer towers. This updated the output of the site from 9.2 MW to 22.5 MW with an expected generation lifetime of 25 years. As the turbines can be seen from some distance and the fact that they overlook the Brontë Country to the north, they have the subject of continued criticism and objections.

== Geology ==
This moorland area of the South Pennines is mostly overlaid with peat and underlaid with sandstone that is 310 million years old. The area in and around Ovenden Moor was quarried for the Rough Rock Flagstone that was used for buildings in the Halifax area. There are also bands of mudstone and coal, with coal being worked historically in the area (east of Ovenden Moor) even though the seams were very narrow by commercial colliery standards.

== History ==
The site was first proposed as a wind farm in the early 1990s and development took place soon after government approval was granted in 1992. At a cost of £10.6 million, 23 turbines were erected at 1,440 feet (440 m) above sea level in a staggered V-shape to take advantage of the prevailing south-westerly wind. The site first started generating power in June 1993. The first generation wind turbines were designed and built by Vestas with a height of 166 feet (51 m) and would each generate 400 kWh with the whole site generating 9.2 MWh in total. The turbines on the site would start generating power at 11 miles per hour (18 km/h) and would reach their optimum power generation at 27 miles per hour (43 km/h).

The power output from the site was fed via a sub-surface 11 kilovolt cable eastwards into the National Grid near to the village of Denholme. The first generation site provided enough power for 5,600 homes and stopped over 10,000 tonnes (11,000 tons) of carbon dioxide and over 90 tonnes (99 tons) of sulphur dioxide being released into the atmosphere.

The development of the wind farm included many groundworks to locate the foundations in the peat that overlies the bedrock. (Note: The peat overlies a bedrock of coal measures and millstone grit.) During the building phase, a crack in the bedrock, as a result of the earthworks, diverted a watercourse and the cabling works caused the peat to dry out. This has been cited by opponents of wind farm schemes across the United Kingdom when challenging the application process at the approvals stage. Access from the local roads onto the moorland was developed using a special floating road of interwoven plastic grids. This was one of the first uses of this style of access to prevent degradation of the peat underlying the track of the road. The wind farm was temporarily switched off in late April and early May 2010 due to an extensive moor fire that had to be tackled by the West Yorkshire Fire Service.

Funding for the wind farm was supplied partly from the European Commission's Thermie Programme which was designed to help start renewable energy projects. The Commission funded €2 million of the final €9.1 million towards the project. The builders of the wind farm were also required to report back to the EU to outlay the inherent planning, cost, infrastructure and operating problems of a windfarm on high moorland.

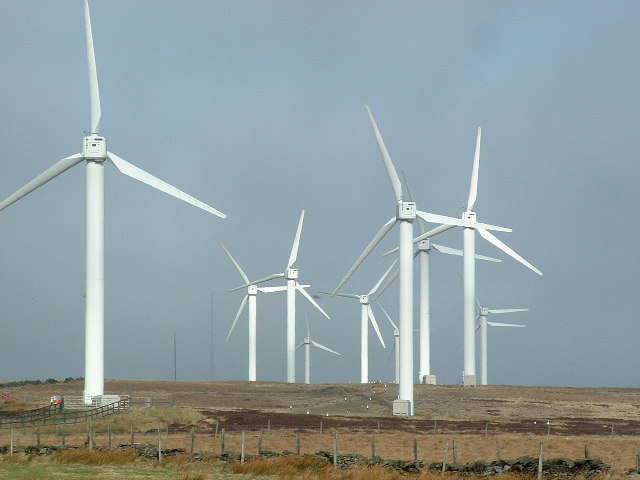
Ovenden Moor Wind Farm. These are some of the original 23 turbines.

The old turbines and towers were decommissioned by March 2015 and were replaced in 2016 by a £12 million scheme of 370 ft (110 m) tall newer generation units which are capable of generating 2.5 MWh each. The total power output of the new wind farm is 22.5 MW which meant that only four turbines need to be erected to supplant the power of the turbines they were replacing. Spanish company Gamesa had won the contract and supplied nine of its G80 (2MW) turbines. Planning was initially submitted for ten turbines in 2008, but was reformed and re-submitted in 2012 with one less turbine, downrating the power output from 25 MW to 22.5 MW. The site is estimated to be generating electricity 95% of the time and is believed to be able to generate 49 GWh per year (enough to supply over 11,000 homes) and would save over 21,000 tonnes (23,000 tons) of carbon dioxide being released into the environment over a year. Ovenden Moor Repower started generating in early 2017, despite weather related delays in the construction of the site and is expected to be generating electricity for 25 years.

The older turbines suffered from a lower generation outputs due to wind strength, whereas the newer turbines have a higher rated resistance to damage from strong winds. The older turbines would automatically shut off when the wind was blowing above 56 miles per hour (90 km/h), although this was not enough to prevent damage as on at least one occasion, the sails of some of the turbines were ripped off in strong winds. The newer turbines have been designed to withstand wind speeds of up to 150 miles per hour (240 km/h), a far higher threshold than the previous ones.

The generating company is Yorkshire Wind Power Limited who operate two other wind farms at Royd Moor near to Penistone in South Yorkshire and Out Newton near to Easington in the East Riding of Yorkshire. The first generation venture was a 50/50 joint enterprise between Yorkshire Water and Yorkshire Electricity. Yorkshire Water sold their stake in the business in May 2002 to Energy Powers Resources. Yorkshire Wind Power is now a joint 50/50 enterprise between E.ON Climate and Renewables and Energy Power Resources Ltd, although the land is still owned by Yorkshire Water. Operation of the wind farm is controlled remotely from E.ON's offices in Coventry in the West Midlands.

The wind farm has been praised but has mostly been criticised by local people and also the local MP. Whilst campaigners against the wind farm recognise that it produces Low-carbon energy, (Note: Wind turbines can be carbon neutral after six months, but this timeframe is often expanded due to the need to build roads across peat moorland which dries out the peat and releases carbon dioxide into the atmosphere) it was noted that the wind farm had only been operating for 31% of the time in 2005 and only 25% of the time in 2009. The proximity to Haworth had raised objections by The Bronte Society and the local population that the turbines were despoiling the area and would have a negative effect on tourism to the region. This was highlighted by local people when the plans for the new height of the wind turbines was being unveiled, with comments stating that their visibility will be further than ever before and attracting the view that it will despoil a huge swathe of Yorkshire, (on a clear day, the turbines will be able to be seen from 35 miles (56 km) away).

The location of the site is 4 miles (6 km) north of Halifax, 7 miles (12 km) west of Bradford, 3 miles (5 km) south of Haworth and the area it overlooks to the north is designated as Brontë Country. The site is closest to the village of Ogden and Ogden Reservoir (2 miles (2.5 km) to the south east), but the high ground it occupies is known as Ovenden Moor. The site straddles the watershed between the waters that feed Warley Reservoir to the west, the Worth Valley to the north, the Calder Valley to the south, and Airedale and the Upper Bradford district to the east.

== See also ==
- List of onshore wind farms in the United Kingdom
