= Winscales Moor Wind Farm =

Wind farm in Cumbria, England

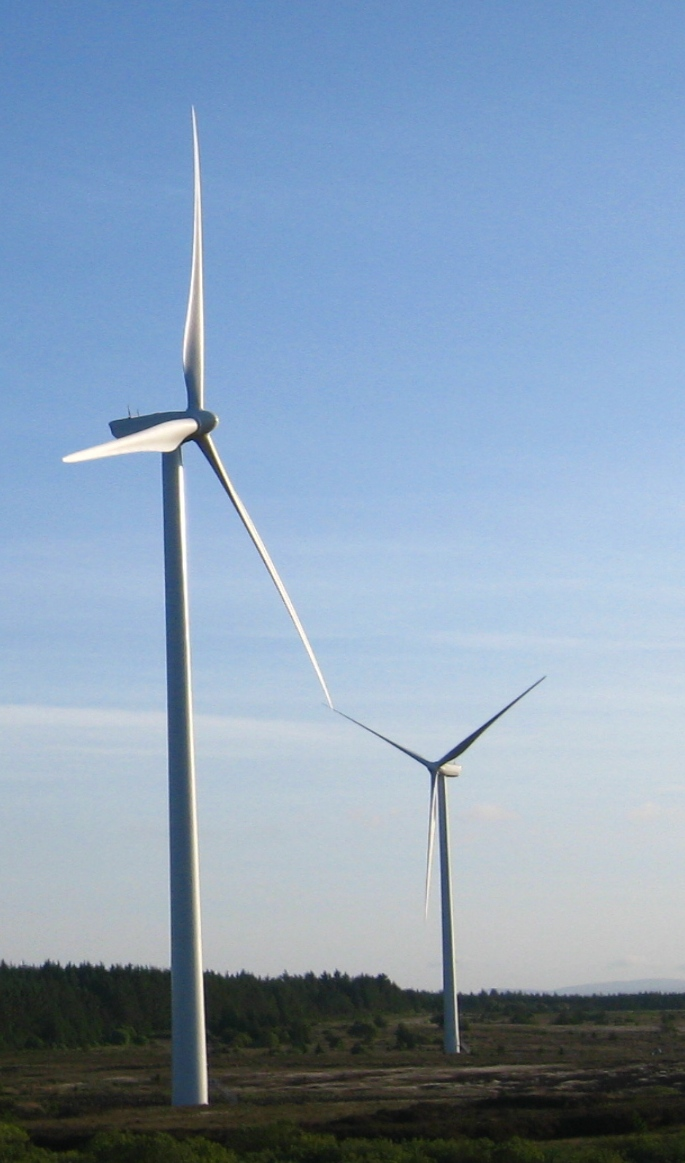
- Vestas wind turbines
- Country: England, United Kingdom
- Location: near Winscales, Cumbria
- Coordinates: 54°38′24″N 03°29′49″W
- Status: Operational
- Commission date: May 2009
- Owner: Mistral

Power generation
- Units operational: 7 X 0.85 MW
- Make and model: Vestas
- Nameplate capacity: 5.95 MW

External links
- Website: www.winscalesmoorwindfarm.com
- Commons: Related media on Commons

Winscales Moor Wind Farm is a group of 7 turbines located between the A595 and A66, near Winscales, in Cumbria, England. The turbines have a tip height of 81 metres, the total installed capacity is 5.95 MW. The wind farm was developed by Your Energy Ltd and is owned by Mistral Windfarms. Engineering Renewables Ltd manage the construction and operation.

== Description ==
Otherwise known as the Winscales Extension, it is located adjacent to the original Winscales Wind Farm, built in 1999. There are seven Vestas V52 turbines producing an annual energy output of 18,800 MWh, equivalent to the needs of approximately 4,000 households.

Your Energy Ltd submitted an application to Allerdale Borough Council in December 2006 for approval and planning permission was granted in June 2007. It became operational in May 2009.

Cumbrian firm Story Construction were the main contractor appointed to build the wind farm. The Vestas turbines are 81 metres high: 50 metres to the hub and a 62-metre diameter rotor.

The wind farm will contribute £130,000 during its life towards projects in the parishes of Winscales, Great Clifton and Little Clifton.

Local projects to benefit include the Great Clifton Village Hall which received £5,200 towards a new central heating system, and Little Clifton Village Hall received £8,000 towards renovations.

The fund is administered by the Cumbria Community foundation

The wind farm is featured on a Windspotting Brochure produced for tourists to the area.
