= Seabank Power Station =

Power station in Bristol, England

Coordinates: 51.540°N 2.669°W

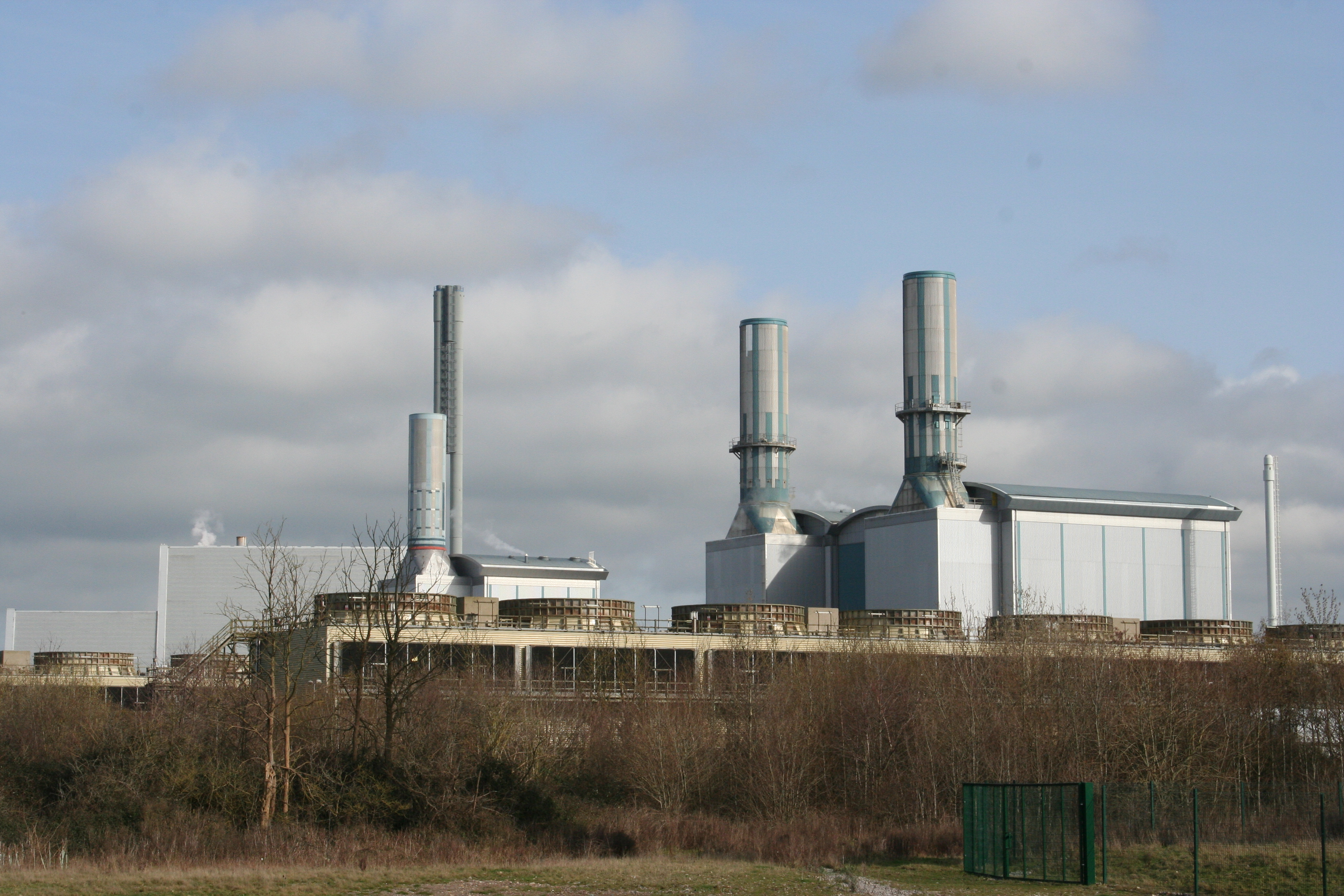
Seabank Power Station

Seabank Power Station is a 1,140 MW gas-fired power station at Hallen Marsh in Bristol, England. It is situated beside the A403 road and Severn Estuary, just north of Avonmouth and south of Severn Beach, close to the boundary with South Gloucestershire. It is next to the former Terra Nitrogen Severnside fertiliser works, which was closed by Growhow UK in January 2008.

The £435 million plant is run as Seabank Power Ltd. The initial partners in the company were BG Group (former part of British Gas) and Scottish and Southern Energy (SSE), however in 2010 BG Group, as part of its reorganisation sold its 50% share of the plant to Cheung Kong Infrastructure Holdings Limited The company is now owned by Cheung Kong Infrastructure Holdings Limited, and SSE.

It was built by Siemens Power Generation and initially opened in 2000. It was built in two parts, with Seabank 1 (755 MW) started in January 1996 and completed in March 2000. Seabank 2 (385 MW) was started in January 1999 and was completed in January 2001. The station has a number of step up transformers that allow connection to the National Grid high voltage electricity transmission system via the Seabank 400 kV GIS substation. The power plant provides enough electricity for approximately 1.6 million people.

Seabank is a combined cycle gas turbine (CCGT) type power station that runs on natural gas. The gas is supplied to the station via the company's own 74-bar 42-inch (1,100 mm) pipeline that runs from a gas compressor station near Abson in Pucklechurch, Bristol through South Gloucestershire to the station. The station can also utilise the local gas connection, that was used to connect the previous Seabank naptha/gas cracking station that occupied the site prior to the power station. The section first built consists of two Siemens V94.3A gas turbines with two heat recovery steam generators (HRSG) and a steam turbine. The next built section consists of one V94.3A gas turbine, an HRSG and a steam turbine. It has a 55% thermal efficiency. The HRSGs were built by Standard Fasel Lentjes (known as SFL and now owned by NEM Energy) and Stork Power Services, both Dutch companies.
