= West Durham Wind Farm =

Wind farm in County Durham, England

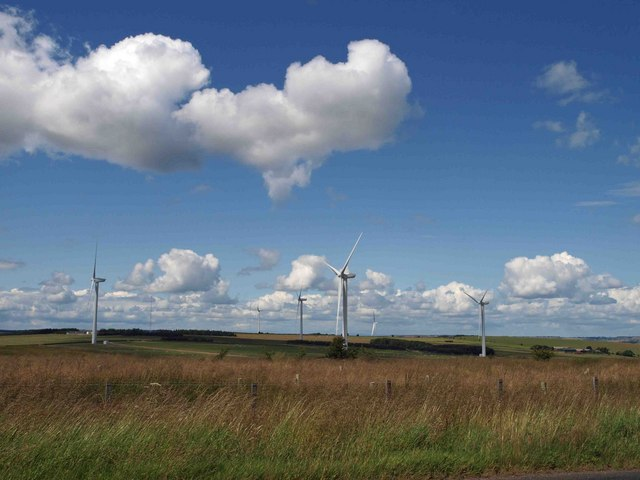
- West Durham Wind Farm
- Country: England, United Kingdom
- Location: near Tow Law, County Durham
- Coordinates: 54.7680°N 1.8216°W
- Status: Operational
- Commission date: May 2009
- Owner: ESB Group

Power generation
- Units operational: 26 × 2 MW
- Make and model: REpower: MM82
- Nameplate capacity: 24 MW

West Durham Wind Farm is a wind farm near Tow Law, County Durham, England.

== History ==
Developed by County Durham-based company the Banks Group, the farm was planned as the largest wind farm in North East England. Construction of the farm began on the 11 July 2008. It was hoped that the commissioning of the turbines would make County Durham the first English county to hit its 2010 renewable energies target. The farm was commissioned in May 2009. In 2009 it was purchased by the Electricity Supply Board

== Design and specification ==
The wind farm has a nameplate capacity of 24MW, containing twelve Repower MM82 turbines each rated at 2MW. It was the first wind farm containing turbines supported on driven steel tubular piles.
