= Great Clifton =

Village and civil parish in Cumbria, England

Coordinates: 54.649°N 3.483°W

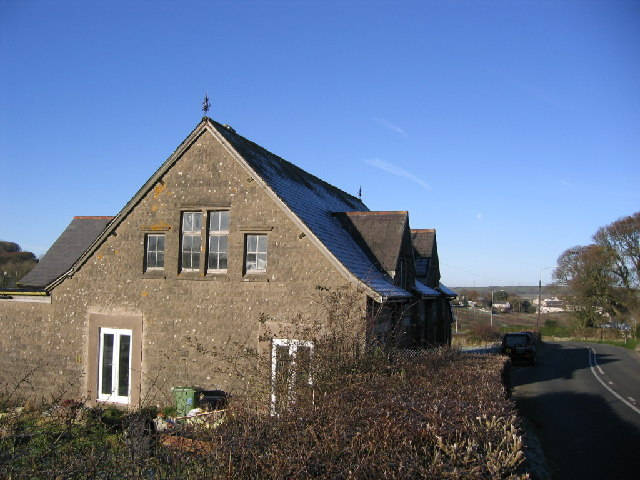
- Great Clifton church rooms

- Location in Allerdale Location within Cumbria
- Population: 1,114 (2011)
- OS grid reference: NY0429
- Civil parish: Great Clifton
- Unitary authority: Cumberland
- Ceremonial county: Cumbria
- Region: North West
- Country: England
- Sovereign state: United Kingdom
- Post town: WORKINGTON
- Postcode district: CA14
- Dialling code: 01900
- Police: Cumbria
- Fire: Cumbria
- Ambulance: North West
- UK Parliament: Whitehaven and Workington

Great Clifton is a village and civil parish in the Cumberland district in the English county of Cumbria. In the 2001 census, it has a population of 1,101, increasing slightly to 1,114 at the 2011 Census.

== Location ==
Workington is 3 miles (5 km) west of the village and Cockermouth is 7 miles (11 km) east. The River Derwent is roughly 1 mile (2 km) north of Great Clifton.

== Features ==
The village has a post office, general store and three pubs.

The village school, Derwent Vale Primary School, was built in 1995. Its predecessor was in a building opposite the old pit, now a private residence.

There are several wind farms nearby, one being the Winscales Moor Wind Farm whose Community Fund has contributed money to the local village hall.

The local rugby league team, the Great Clifton Lions, currently compete in the CARLA League.

== Governance ==
Great Clifton is part of the parliamentary constituency of Whitehaven and Workington.

Great Clifton has its own Parish Council; Great Clifton Parish Council.

== Notable people ==
Ex Footballer John Burridge lived in the village as a child, he mentioned this in his autobiography Budgie.

== Listed building ==
There is one listed building in the parish, the house at No. 5 Middlegate. It is roughcast with a green slate roof, and has two storeys and three bays. The doorway has an architrave with a pediment, and the windows are sashes.
