= Knabs Ridge Wind Farm =

Wind farm in North Yorkshire, England

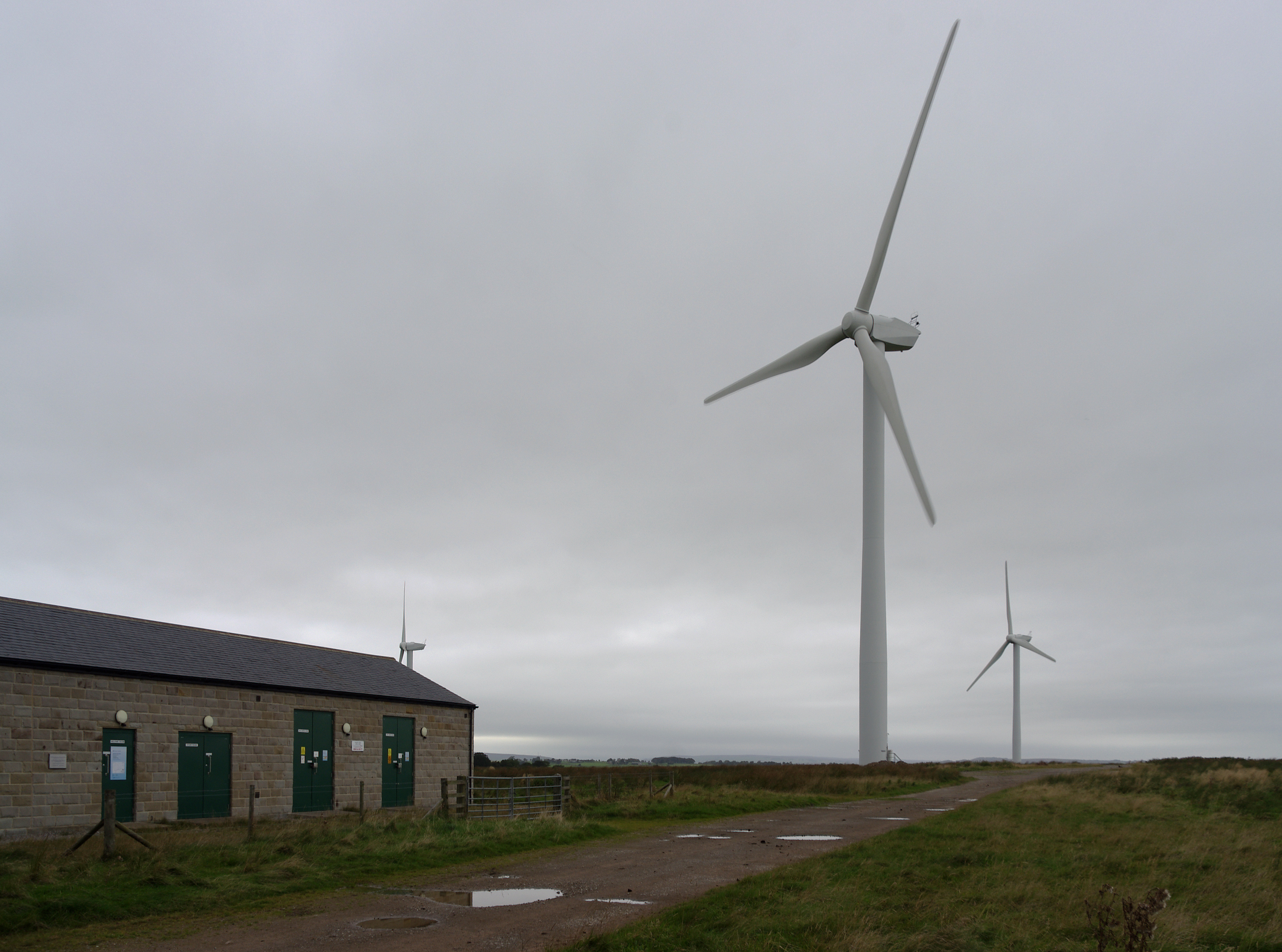
- Knabs Ridge Wind Farm
- Country: England
- Location: Penny Pot Lane, Felliscliffe, North Yorkshire
- Coordinates: 53.9981°N 1.6474°W
- Status: Active
- Construction began: March 2007
- Commission date: November 2008
- Operator: RWE Npower Renewables

Wind farm
- Type: Onshore
- Hub height: 190 feet (58 m)
- Rotor diameter: 230 feet (70 m)
- Site area: 197 acres (80 ha)
- Site elevation: 708 feet (216 m)

Power generation
- Units operational: Eight
- Nameplate capacity: 16 MW

External links
- Commons: Related media on Commons

Knabs Ridge Wind Farm is an electricity generating site just south of the A59 road near to Felliscliffe, Kettlesing, North Yorkshire, England. It was the first wind farm to be built in North Yorkshire in over 15 years, and was believed to be the first time that civilian air traffic was considered in the planning permission process.

== History ==
The proposal to build a wind farm on the site was first unveiled in 2003 when 6,000 homes in the area were leafleted with information about the wind farm. At that early stage, many objections were registered, including one from the Campaign for the Protection of Rural England (CPRE). Planning consent for the wind farm was rejected by Harrogate Borough Council in November 2004. The management team at Leeds Bradford Airport (LBA), whose runway is only 10 miles (16 km) south of the site, stated that the farm would have a detrimental effect on air traffic control as it could create false indications of aircraft. Other objectors pointed out that the site of was only 50 feet (15 m) away from the Nidderdale AONB. Npower appealed against the decision and the application then went before a public enquiry, which gained government consent in September 2005. The objection by LBA towards the wind farm is believed to be the first time that civilian air traffic paths have featured in an onshore wind farm consent inquiry. The planning inspector also rejected the idea of affixing red lights to each tower as it was thought that they could interfere with drivers concentration on the adjacent A59 road.

Building of the £13 million wind farm 3 miles (4.8 km) west of Harrogate in Felliscliffe by the A59 road, was started in March 2007, completed by the summer of 2008 with full commissioning of the site starting in November of the same year. The wind farm consists of eight towers which are 190 feet (58 m) high, with the addition of the rotors, the full height that they extend to is 305 feet (93 m). The site covers an area of 197 acres (80 ha) at an elevation of 708 feet (216 m) above sea level, so they can be seen from some distance away.

Each generating unit was constructed by Senvion and is capable of generating 2 MW of power with the whole farm itself generating 16 MW in total. This provides enough electricity per year to power 7,000 homes and offsets over 23,000 tonnes (25,000 tons) of carbon dioxide going into the environment on an annual basis.

One of the turbines caught fire in January 2017 and had to be extinguished by North Yorkshire fire service. Each unit operates in tandem with three others (the Knabs Ridge site has eight units, which operate in two groups of four) which resulted in all four generating units being turned off. Seven months after the fire, the owners were seeking to overturn a condition in the planning permission of the site that was set in 2005. If a turbine was to not generate power in over twelve months, then the owners are required to remove the tower and return the land to grazing purposes for cattle. By October 2017, the tower was still not active.

== See also ==
- List of onshore wind farms in the United Kingdom
