= Langley Park Wind Farm =

Wind farm in County Durham, England

- Country: England, United Kingdom
- Location: Langley Park, County Durham
- Coordinates: 54.795°N 1.6672°W
- Status: Operational
- Commission date: December 2008
- Owner: EDF Energy
- Operator: Cumbria Wind Farms

Wind farm
- Hub height: 59m
- Rotor diameter: 82m
- Site elevation: 1552 ft

Power generation
- Units operational: 4 × 2.05 MW
- Make and model: REpower Systems: MM82
- Nameplate capacity: 8.2 MW

Langley Park Wind Farm is a wind farm near Langley Park, County Durham, England. It was developed by EDF Energy and is operated by Cumbria Wind Farms, the farm has a nameplate capacity of 8.2 MW, containing four REpower Systems' MM82 turbines each rated at 2.05MW.

In 2008 EDF accepted that it had failed to check the impact of the turbines on digital television reception, after residents of villages where the turbines lay on a line-of-sight to the local TV transmitter complained of a loss of signal strength and severe Freeview Digital Services disruption, particularly when the turbine blades rotate.
