= Felliscliffe =

Civil parish in North Yorkshire, England

Coordinates: 54°0′40″N 1°39′10″W

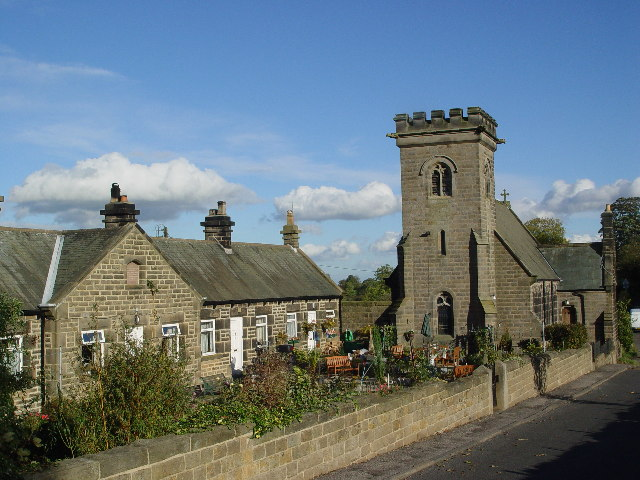
Chapel of Ease

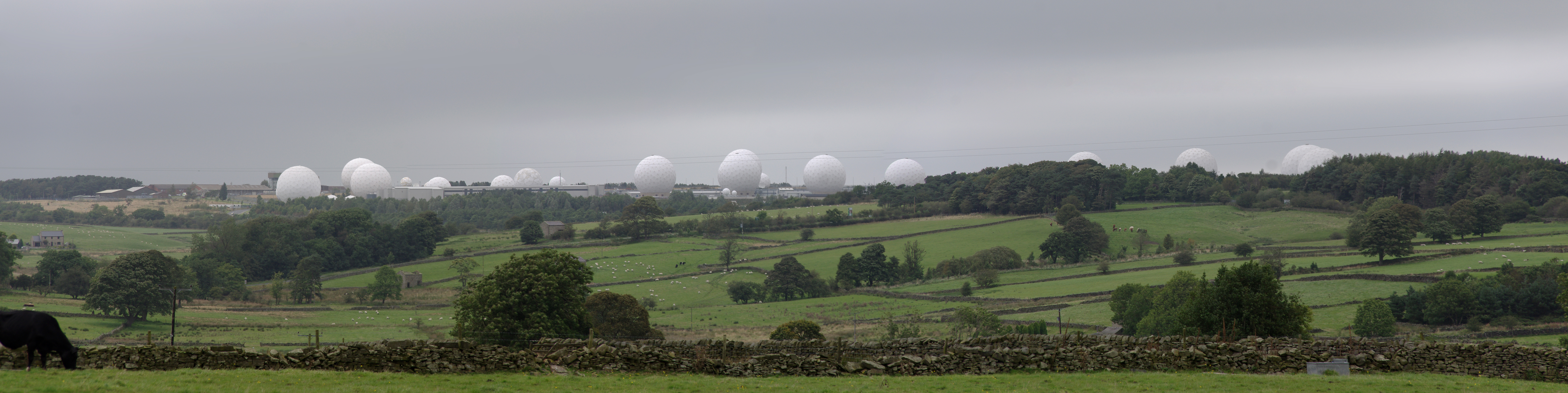
RAF Menwith Hill radar station, part of which lies in Feliscliffe

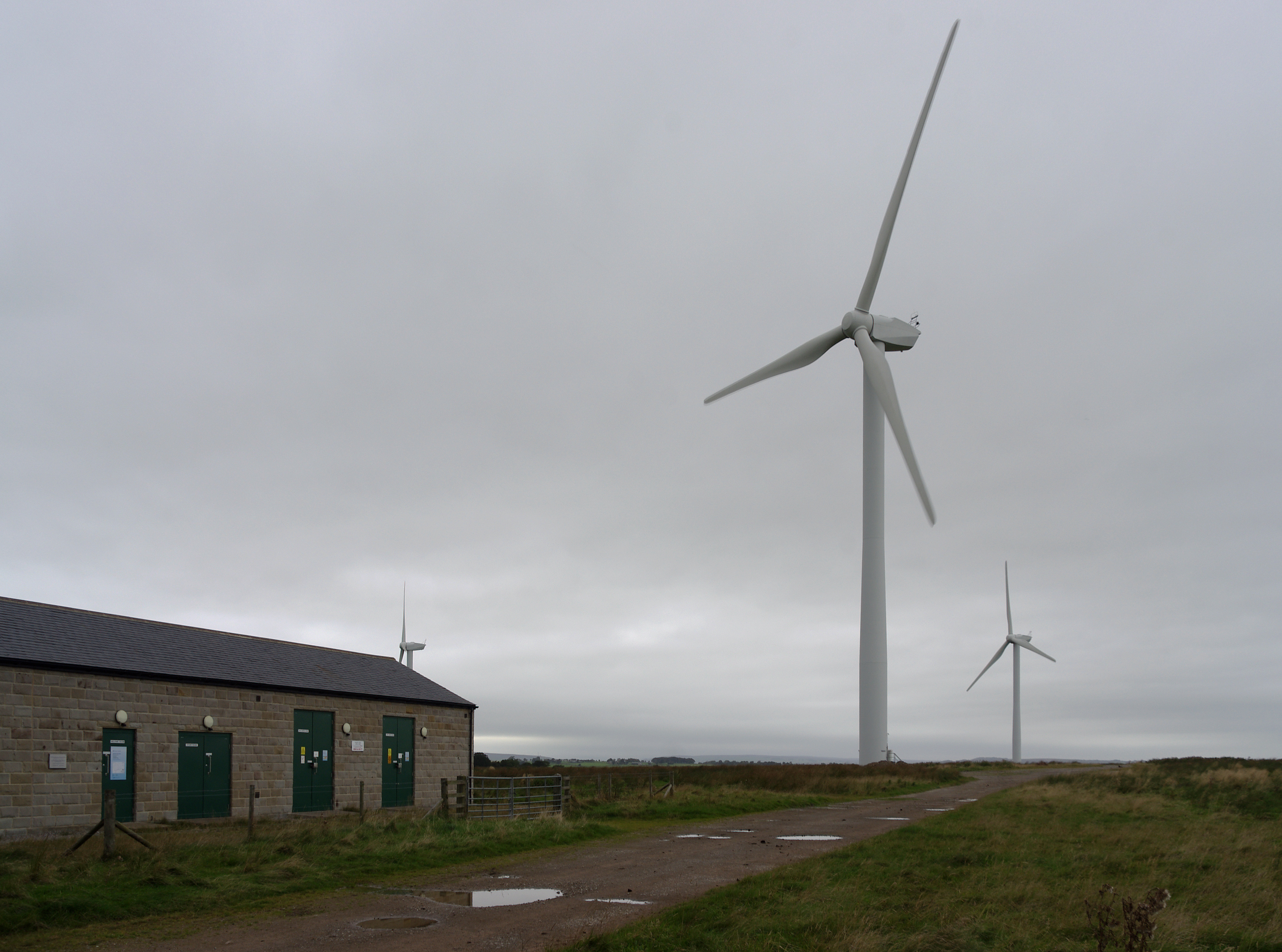
Knabs Ridge Wind Farm

Felliscliffe is a civil parish in North Yorkshire, England, in Nidderdale. The population of the civil parish at the 2011 census was 283. The principal settlement in the parish is the village of Kettlesing, and the parish also includes the hamlet of Swincliffe.

== History ==
Felliscliffe was historically a township in the ancient parish of Hampsthwaite in the West Riding of Yorkshire, first mentioned in the Domesday Book as Felgesclif, apparently from an Old Danish personal name Felagh.

The township served Fountains Abbey with flax, with monastery paths leading along Tang Beck, a tributary of the River Nidd, still in existence. Traces of Iron Age and Roman settlements have been discovered in the parish, indicating that it has been inhabited continuously for several millennia.

In 1866 Felliscliffe became a separate civil parish. From 1974 to 2023 it was part of the Borough of Harrogate, it is now administered by the unitary North Yorkshire Council.

== Location ==
The parish is west of Harrogate. It includes part of the US intelligence-gathering base at RAF Menwith Hill. Kettlesing Felliscliffe Community Primary School is in Kettlesing.

The parish skyline, on the ridge to the south of the A59, is now dominated by the eight 190 feet (58 m) wind turbine towers of the Knabs Ridge Wind Farm.

== Notable residents ==
John Farrah owned two farms at Felliscliffe before he died in 1907.

== See also ==
- Listed buildings in Felliscliffe
