= Burton Wold Wind Farm =

Wind farm near Burton Latimer in Northamptonshire, England

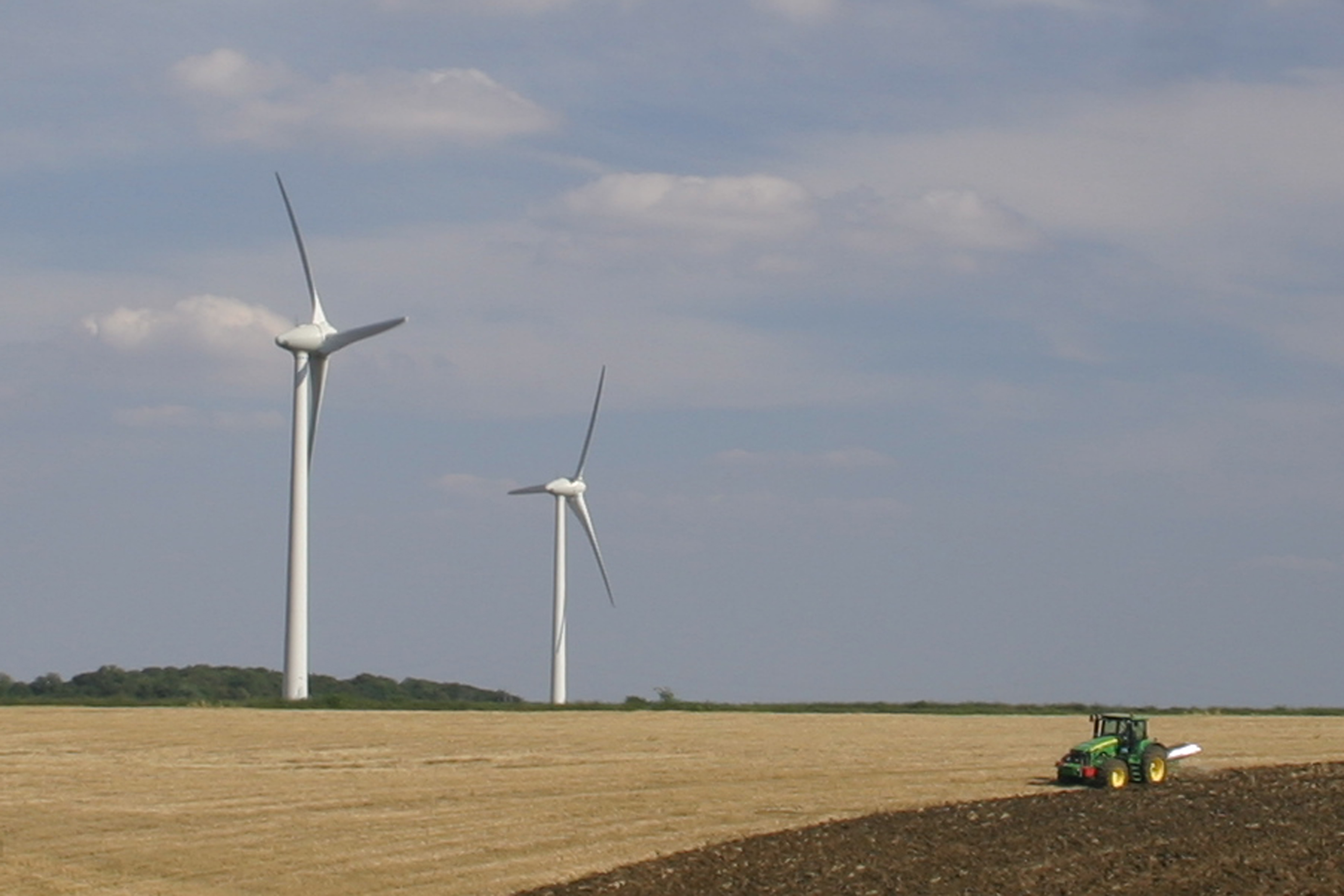
- Country: England
- Location: Burton Latimer, Kettering, Northamptonshire
- Coordinates: 52°21′30″N 0°39′0″W
- Status: Operational
- Construction began: December 2005
- Commission date: May 2006

Wind farm
- Type: Onshore

Power generation
- Nameplate capacity: 20 MW

External links
- Commons: Related media on Commons

Burton Wold Wind Farm is a wind farm located near Burton Latimer in the English county of Northamptonshire, UK. The farm was developed by Your Energy Ltd, is owned by Mistral Windfarms and operated by Engineering Renewables Ltd. E.ON UK is buying the electricity output of the project under a long-term power purchase agreement. The farm is spread over three hectares. It has an installed capacity of 20 MW and generate on average around 40,000,000 units (kilowatt hours) of electricity annually.

== Output ==
Burton Wold Wind Farm comprises 10 turbines with a total nameplate capacity of 20 megawatts. These 10 turbines have the ability to produce electricity for an average of 10,000 homes each year, the equivalent of 25% of all the homes in the borough of Kettering. The E70-E4 turbines were supplied by Enercon Gmbh of Germany, who are one of the leading manufacturers of wind turbines in the world. Each turbine is 64 meters tall to the hub, the rotor blades have a diameter of 71 meters which gives the turbines an overall height from the ground to the vertical tip of a blade of 99.5 meters.

== Funding ==
The wind farm will contribute £280,000 to a community fund during its 25-year life, which is directed towards energy efficiency and education projects within Burton Latimer. The fund is administered by the Kettering Borough Council. The fund has paid for solar hot water heaters at a local sheltered housing development, sun pipes at a local school, and contributed £10,000 towards energy efficient renovations of the Guide Hall. The fund is cited as a case study in two reports produced by the Renewables Advisory Board.

In 2008 Kettering Borough Council approved an application for a further seven turbines, submitted by Burton Wold Wind Farm Extension Limited, a Company owned by the Beaty Family.

== See also ==
- Wind power in the United Kingdom
