= Holmside Hall Wind Farm =

Wind farm in County Durham, England

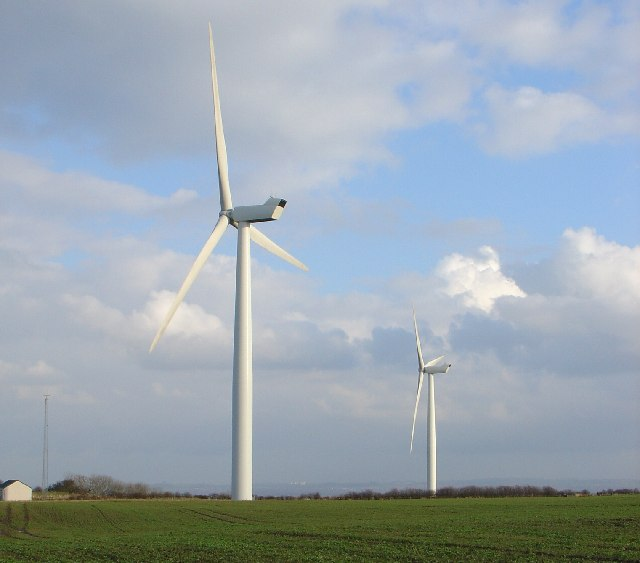
- The two turbines of Holmside Hall
- Country: England, United Kingdom
- Location: Stanley, County Durham
- Coordinates: 54.8472°N 1.68694°W
- Status: Operational
- Commission date: May 2004
- Owner: E.ON UK
- Site elevation: 722 ft

Power generation
- Units operational: 2 × 2.75 MW
- Make and model: NEG Micon
- Nameplate capacity: 5.5 MW

External links
- Commons: Related media on Commons

Holmside Hall Wind Farm is a wind farm near Stanley, County Durham, England. Owned and operated by E.ON UK, the farm has a nameplate capacity of 5.5MW, containing two NM80 turbines each rated at 2.75 MW.

At the time of construction, which was delayed due to high winds, the turbines were the largest and most powerful in the UK.
