= Broom Hill =

Broom Hill may refer to:

- Broom Hill, Bristol, England
- Broom Hill, County Durham, England
- Broom Hill, Hadleigh, Suffolk, England
- Broom Hill, an area of Ingleby Barwick, North Yorkshire, England
- Broom Hill, London, a district in Bromley
- Broom Hill, Greater Victoria, near Sooke, on the southern tip of Vancouver Island, British Columbia, Canada
- Broom Hill, Indiana, USA
- a place in Western Australia, now called Broomehill

== See also ==
- Broomhill (disambiguation)
- Broomhall (disambiguation)
- Broomehill (disambiguation)
