= Broomhill =

Broomhill is a place name, and may refer to:

== In Canada ==
- Broomhill, Manitoba, a community in Albert Rural Municipality

== In England ==
- Broomhill, Frome Vale, a district near Fishponds in north Bristol
- Broom Hill, Bristol, sometimes written Broomhill, a district near Brislington in south Bristol
- Broom Hill, London, sometimes written Broomhill, a district of Orpington
- Broomhill, Norfolk, a former hamlet now in Downham Market
- Broomhill, Northumberland, a village
- Broomhill, Sheffield, suburb of Sheffield
  - Broomhill (ward), electoral ward of Sheffield
- An ancient parish in Kent lost to the sea in the 13th century, parts of which are now in New Romney
- Broomhill Park, a park in Ipswich, Suffolk; sometimes spelled Broom Hill
- Weeting-with-Broomhill, a civl parish in Norfolk, Broomhill having been historically spelled Bromehill

== In Northern Ireland ==
- Broomhill, County Armagh

== In Scotland ==
- Broomhill, Aberdeen
- Broomhill, Glasgow
- Broomhill railway station, Highland

== See also ==
- Broom Hill (disambiguation)
- Broom-Hilda
- Broomhall (disambiguation)
- Broomehill (disambiguation)
