= Otter Point, Greater Victoria =

Rural forestry district in British Columbia, Canada

Coordinates: 48.3838°N 123.7962°W

Otter Point is a rural forestry district between other rural district of Shirley and town of Sooke.

It references the immediate area around Otter Point Road, a 10 km (6 mi) crescent-shaped thoroughfare beginning and terminating on West Coast Road as well as the area towards Shirley boundary too. The rural district itself is generally considered to begin past the extensive residential subdivisions of Broom Hill, past Helgesen Road.

The character of Otter Point is predominantly rural lifestyle, with many small hobby farms and pockets of forest. The housing ranges from small, modest cottage-type structures and mobile homes to more extensive, upscale residences. Most of the lots are large, consisting of 1-acre (4,000 m^{2}) or more.

== Geography ==
The landscape is rocky with basalt, gabbro and sandstone. Much of it is forested by arbutus (at its western limit), bigleaf maple, alder, and conifers such as shore pine, western red cedar, western hemlock and Douglas-fir. There are many ponds, as well as two substantial lakes — Kemp Lake and Young Lake (the latter being the site of a Scout camp). There are numerous unofficial trails that locals use for walking or riding horses. To the north and east of the neighbourhood is working forest land, much of it licensed for harvesting to Western Forest Products. The areas around the logging roads there are popular with outdoor recreationalists.

== Services ==
No commercial facilities exist in the district; however, there is some light industry, typically operated from area residences.

There are some very limited public facilities such as Otter Point Fire Hall on the corner of Otter Point and Kemp Lake Roads and public parks such as William Simmons Park.
