= Broomehill =

Broomehill is a place name, and may refer to:

- Broomehill, Western Australia, a town in Western Australia
- Shire of Broomehill, a former local government area in Western Australia
- Shire of Broomehill–Tambellup, a local government area in Western Australia
  - Broomehill East, Western Australia, a locality in the Shire of Broomehill–Tambellup
  - Broomehill West, Western Australia, a locality in the Shire of Broomehill–Tambellup

== See also ==
- Broom Hill (disambiguation)
- Broomhill (disambiguation)
