= Portman Road =

Stadium for Ipswich Town Football Club

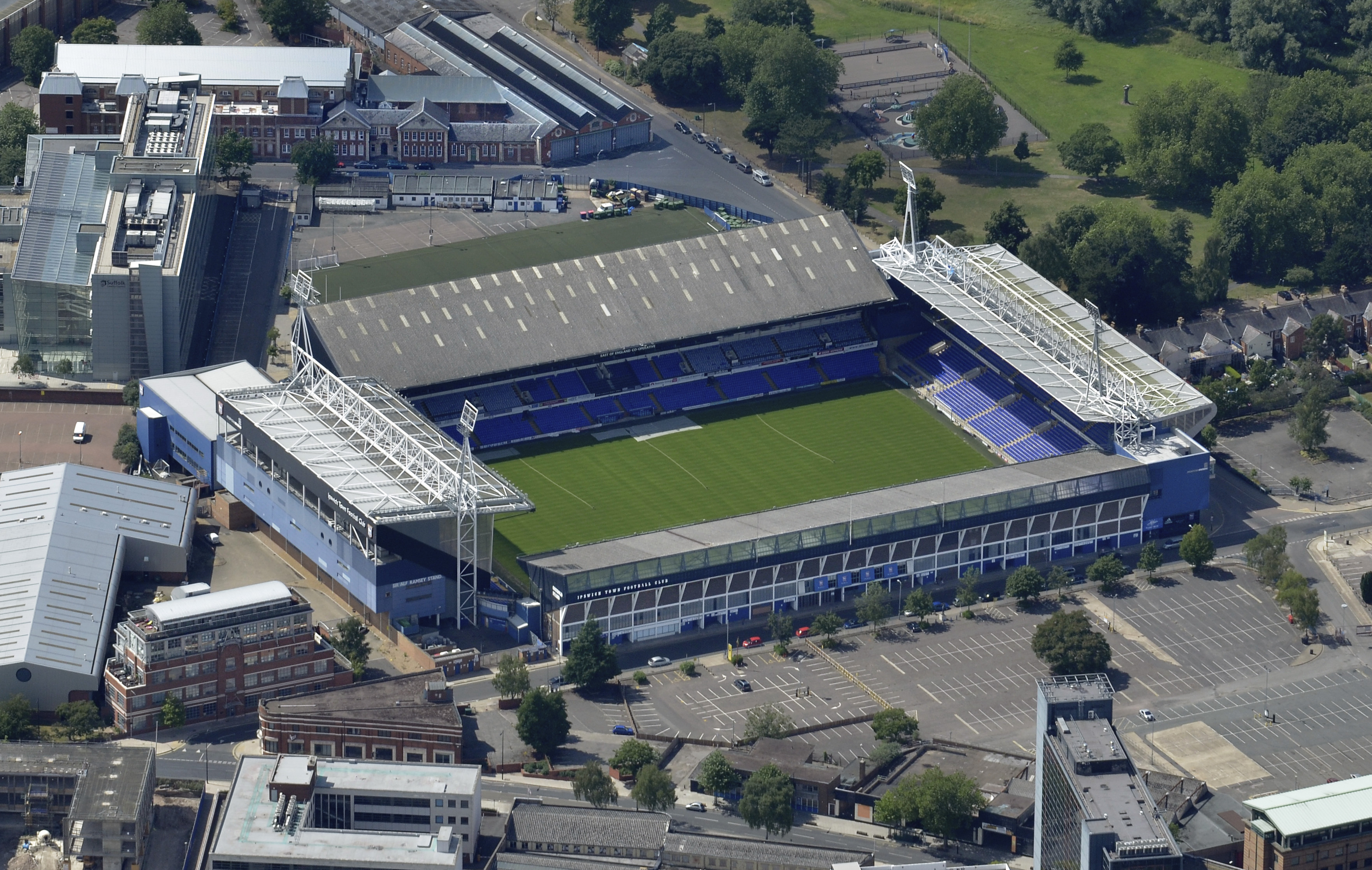
- Aerial view of Portman Road, 2015
- Interactive map of Portman Road
- Full name: Portman Road Stadium
- Location: Ipswich, Suffolk, England
- Coordinates: 52°3′18″N 1°8′43″E
- Owner: Ipswich Borough Council own the land only. Stadium owned by club
- Capacity: 30,056
- Surface: Hybrid grass
- Record attendance: 38,010 (Ipswich Town vs Leeds United, 8 March 1975)
- Field size: 112 yd × 82 yd (102 m × 75 m)
- Public transit: Ipswich

Construction
- Opened: 1884
- Renovated: 2024
- Expanded: 2002

Tenants
- Ipswich Town (1884–present); Ipswich Town F.C. Women (2024–present)

Portman Road is a football stadium in Ipswich, Suffolk, England, which has been the home ground of Ipswich Town since 1884. The stadium has also hosted many England youth international matches, and one senior England friendly international match, against Croatia in 2003. It staged several other sporting events, including athletics meetings and international hockey matches, musical concerts and Christian events.

Ipswich Town moved to the ground in 1884. The stadium recorded its highest attendance in March 1975, when 38,010 fans attended a match against Leeds United. Its four stands were converted to all-seater in the early 1990s following the recommendations of the Taylor Report. The stadium underwent significant redevelopments in the early 2000s, which increased the capacity from 22,600 to more than 30,000, making it the largest-capacity football ground in East Anglia. Once the Gamechanger 20 Ltd takeover in 2021 was completed, the club invested heavily in the stadium to bring it more up to date after years of neglect from the previous ownership. This included new dugouts, undersoil heating and a new hybrid pitch which slightly reduced the overall attendance to 29,673. After the club's promotion back to the Premier League in 2024, the club had to invest heavily again into the stadium to bring it up to the Premier League's standards. This included over 100 projects ranging from new press and camera areas to increasing the away supporter allocation. Once these upgrades were completed, this increased the overall capacity to the current figure of 30,056.

== History ==
Ipswich played their early matches at Broomhill Park, but in 1884, the club moved to Portman Road and have played there ever since. The ground was also used as a cricket pitch during the summer by the East Suffolk Cricket Club, who had played there since 1855. The cricket club had erected a pavilion, the first fixed building at the ground. More substantial elements of ground development did not begin for a further eleven years, though Ipswich became one of the first clubs to implement the use of goal nets in 1890. At this time, Ipswich were an amateur side (the team became professional in 1936) and the first visit of a professional club came in 1892, when Preston North End played a Suffolk County Football Association team. This was followed six years later by a visit from Aston Villa, a game which was so popular that a temporary stand was erected in order to accommodate a crowd of around 5,000. In 1901, a tobacco processing plant was built along the south edge of the ground by the Churchman brothers, a name which would later become synonymous with the south stand located there.

The first permanent stand, a wooden structure known affectionately as the "Chicken Run", was built on the Portman Road side of the ground in 1906. This structure was sold in 1971 to the local speedway team, the Ipswich Witches, who installed it at Foxhall Stadium. In 1914, the ground was commandeered by the British Army for use as a training camp for the duration of the First World War. Control of Portman Road was not returned to the club until two years after the end of the war and significant work was required to repair damage to the ground caused by heavy machinery. For a short period during the 1920s, Portman Road was host to a number of whippet races in an attempt to increase revenue, and in 1928 a small stand was built on the west side of the ground. The football club turned professional in 1936 and the cricket club were forced to move out, so work began on the first bank of terracing at the north end of the pitch. The following year, on the back of winning the Southern League, a similar terrace was built at the southern Churchmans End and 650 tip-up seats, bought from Arsenal, were installed. Portman Road was home to Ipswich Town's first Football League match on 27 August 1938, a 4–2 victory against Southend United in the Third Division (South) witnessed by more than 19,000 spectators.

The Supporters' Association funded a number of improvements at Portman Road; in 1952, concrete terracing replaced the wooden terraces at the cost of £3,000 and another £3,000 was used to re-terrace the North Stand in 1954, bringing the capacity of the ground to approximately 29,000. In 1957, the association raised £30,500 towards the building of a new West Stand, increasing ground capacity to around 31,000. Floodlights were installed two years later; the result of £15,000 raised by the association. The floodlights were switched on by club president Lady Blanche Cobbold for the first floodlit match at the ground, a friendly against Arsenal, in February 1960.

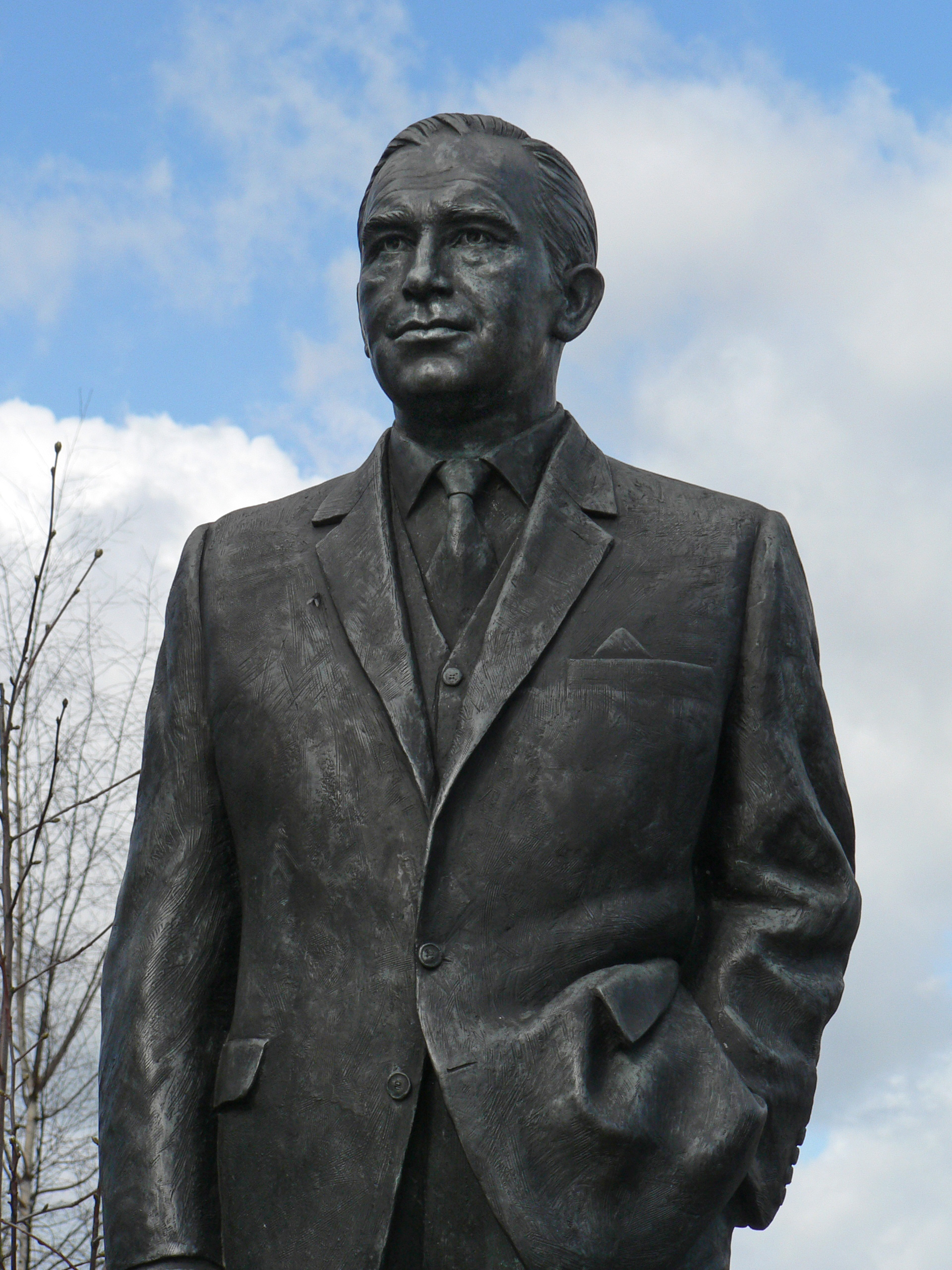
Outside Portman Road is a statue of Sir Alf Ramsey, who led Ipswich Town to the league title in 1962 and England to the World Cup in 1966

Television cameras made their debut at Portman Road in 1962 as Anglia Television arrived for Match of the Week; it was another six years before the BBC televised a match at the ground, Match of the Day visiting Portman Road for the first time in 1968 to witness Ipswich's league fixture against Birmingham City. Meanwhile, ground development continued with roofing enhancements to the North Stand and an increase in capacity to 31,500 by 1963. Dressing rooms were constructed in 1965 and new turnstiles were introduced two years later, including a separate entrance for juveniles at the Churchmans End. In 1968 the club agreed to a new 99-year lease on the ground with owners Ipswich Borough Council.

The two-tier propped cantilever Portman Stand was built along the east side of the ground in place of the existing terraces in 1971, providing 3,500 additional seats and increasing the capacity of the ground to approximately 37,000. Advertising appeared around the perimeter of the ground in the same year, while the following year saw the construction of the "Centre Spot" restaurant underneath the Portman Stand. Additional seating was added to the Portman Stand in 1974 and the ground saw its record attendance of 38,010 the following year in an FA Cup tie against Leeds United. Following success in the 1978 FA Cup, the club invested in 24 executive boxes in front of the Portman Stand and, as a result of the Safety of Sports Ground Act 1975, reduced the capacity in front by introducing seats, taking the overall capacity down to 34,600.

Plastic seats replaced wooden benches in the West Stand in 1980 and in the following year, the club announced a deal with electronics company Pioneer Corporation with the stand expanded at a cost of around £1.3m, renamed the Pioneer Stand and re-opened in 1983. However, the cost of building the stand meant the club had to sell players and led to a decline in fortunes on the pitch. Safety barriers were removed from the North Stand in 1989 following the Hillsborough disaster and following the recommendations of the Taylor Report, the terraces in both the North and South stands were also converted to all-seating. The Pioneer Stand was renamed the Britannia Stand following a new sponsorship deal with the building society in 1999, and in the following year a statue of Sir Alf Ramsey was unveiled at the corner of Portman Road and Sir Alf Ramsey Way.

Success for Ipswich Town in promotion to the Premier League in 2000 led to further investment in the infrastructure, with the club spending around £22 million on redeveloping both the North and South stands. The complete renovation of the South Stand into a two-tier stand added 4,000 seats to the stadium. The subsequent demolition and reconstruction of a two-tier North Stand added a further 4,000 seats and brought the total capacity of the ground to more than 30,000. In 2001, local brewery Greene King took on the sponsorship of the redeveloped South Stand and as such, the stand was renamed the Greene King Stand until 2009, when the sponsorship deal ended and the name reverted to the South Stand.

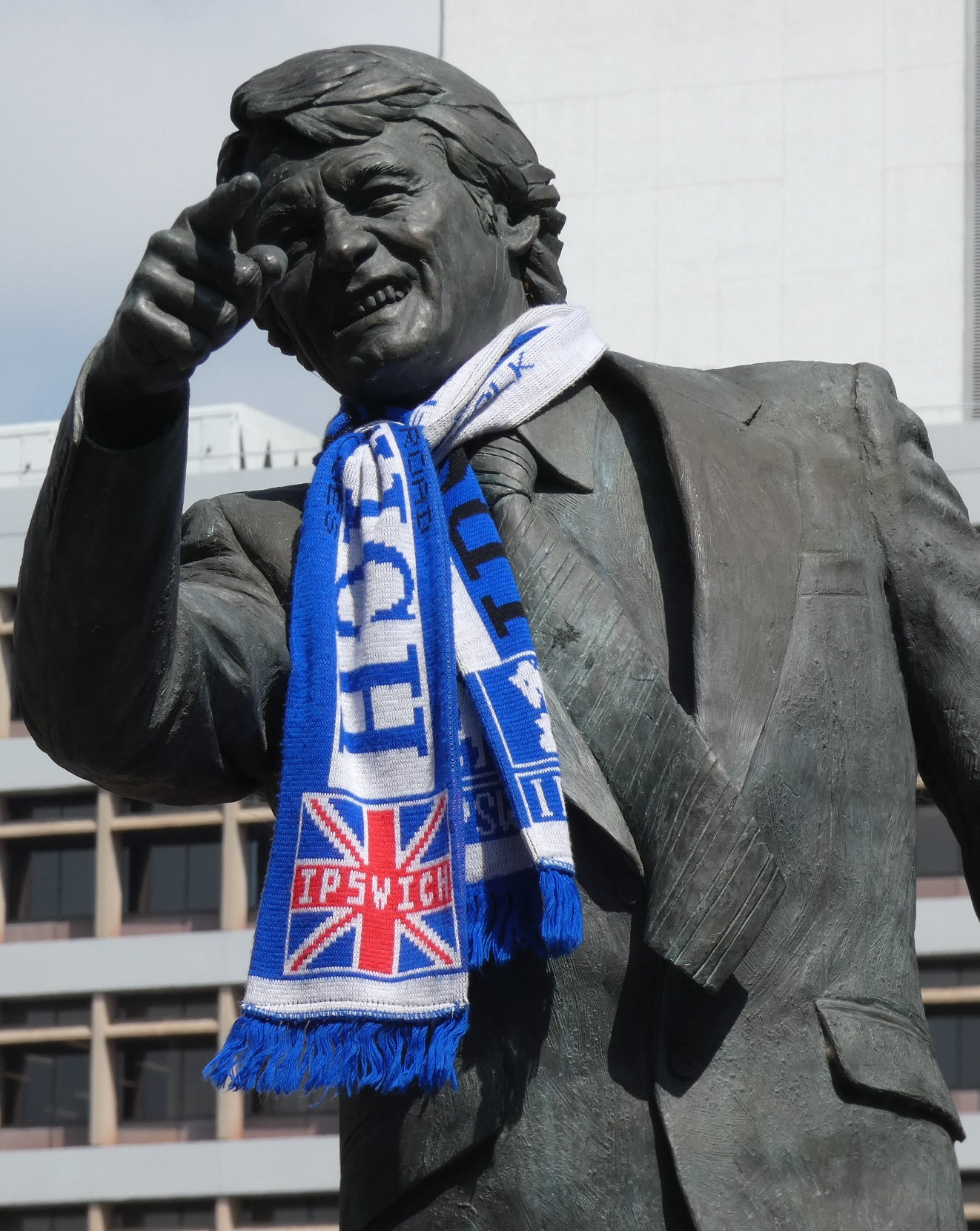
Statue of Sir Bobby Robson, who led Ipswich Town to the FA Cup in 1978 and UEFA Cup in 1981

Following the death of former manager Bobby Robson in 2009, the club announced that the North Stand would be renamed the Sir Bobby Robson Stand. The official unveiling took place at half-time during the league match hosting Newcastle United, another of Robson's former clubs, on 26 September 2009. On 31 March 2012, the South Stand was renamed the Sir Alf Ramsey Stand in memory of Sir Alf Ramsey, who guided Ipswich Town to the First Division title in 1962. The season was the 50th anniversary of Ipswich Town winning the old First Division title. On 10 July 2012, the Britannia Stand was renamed East of England Co-operative Stand following a sponsorship deal with the East of England Co-operative Society.

Following the club's change in ownership in April 2021, it was announced that improvements to Portman Road would begin that summer. These included the prospect of introducing safe standing sections and giant LED screens, improvements to concourse bars, removal of old Marcus Evans branding, as well as general cleanup and restoration work. In July 2021, it was also announced that East of England Co-Op would not be extending their sponsorship of the West Stand, thus the stand's name returned to simply the 'West Stand'. In August 2021, the Magnus Group was announced as the new sponsors of the West Stand, thus the stand became known as the 'Magnus Group West Stand' until the agreement ended in 2023.

In March 2022, the club applied for planning permission to install a large LED screen at the south-east corner of the pitch as well as improvements to the dug outs and adding a new access on the south-east corner. Both of these additions were completed in time for the start of the 2022–23 season. Additionally, the club has purchased the land behind the Sir Alf Ramsey stand, the use of which is yet to be confirmed. A new hybrid pitch was also installed in the summer of 2023 in time for the start of the 2023–24 football season. Following the club's promotion to the Premier League in 2024, further improvements to the stadium were made to bring the stadium up to Premier League standards – these included new floodlight systems, changing rooms, media facilities, and executive boxes.

== Structure and facilities ==
The pitch is surrounded by four all-seater stands, the Sir Bobby Robson Stand, the Cobbold Stand, the Sir Alf Ramsey Stand and the West Stand. All stands are covered and are multi-tiered.

=== Sir Bobby Robson Stand ===
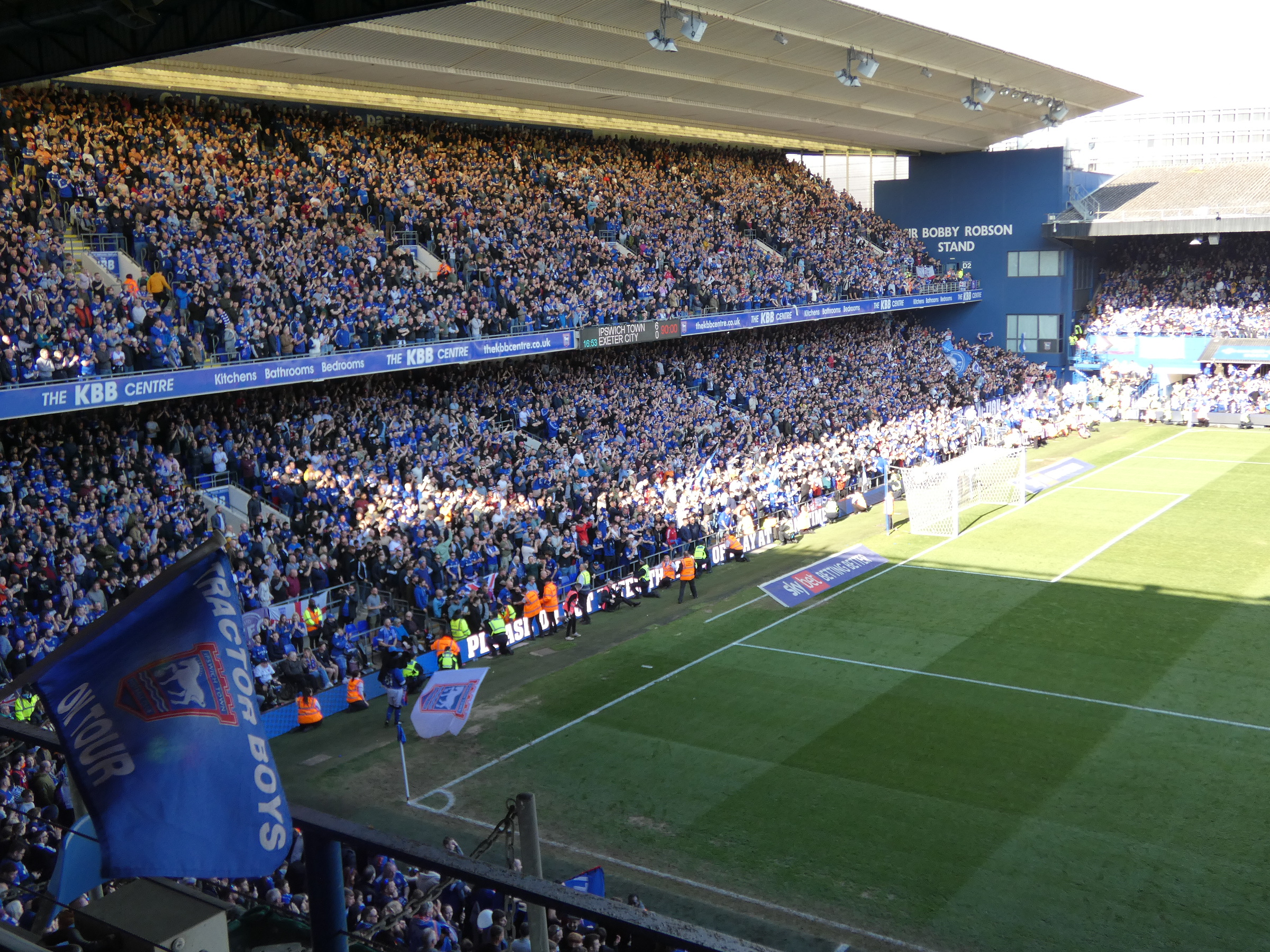
The Sir Bobby Robson Stand, also known as the North Stand

The Sir Bobby Robson Stand was completely rebuilt in 2001 following Portman Road's redevelopment and has a capacity of around 7,500. It is a two-tier cantilever stand which is divided into an adults-only lower tier "...traditionally for the 'hard core' Town fan..." and a mixed upper tier. It was previously known as simply the North Stand but was renamed to its current name in 2009 following the death of former manager Bobby Robson.

=== Cobbold Stand ===
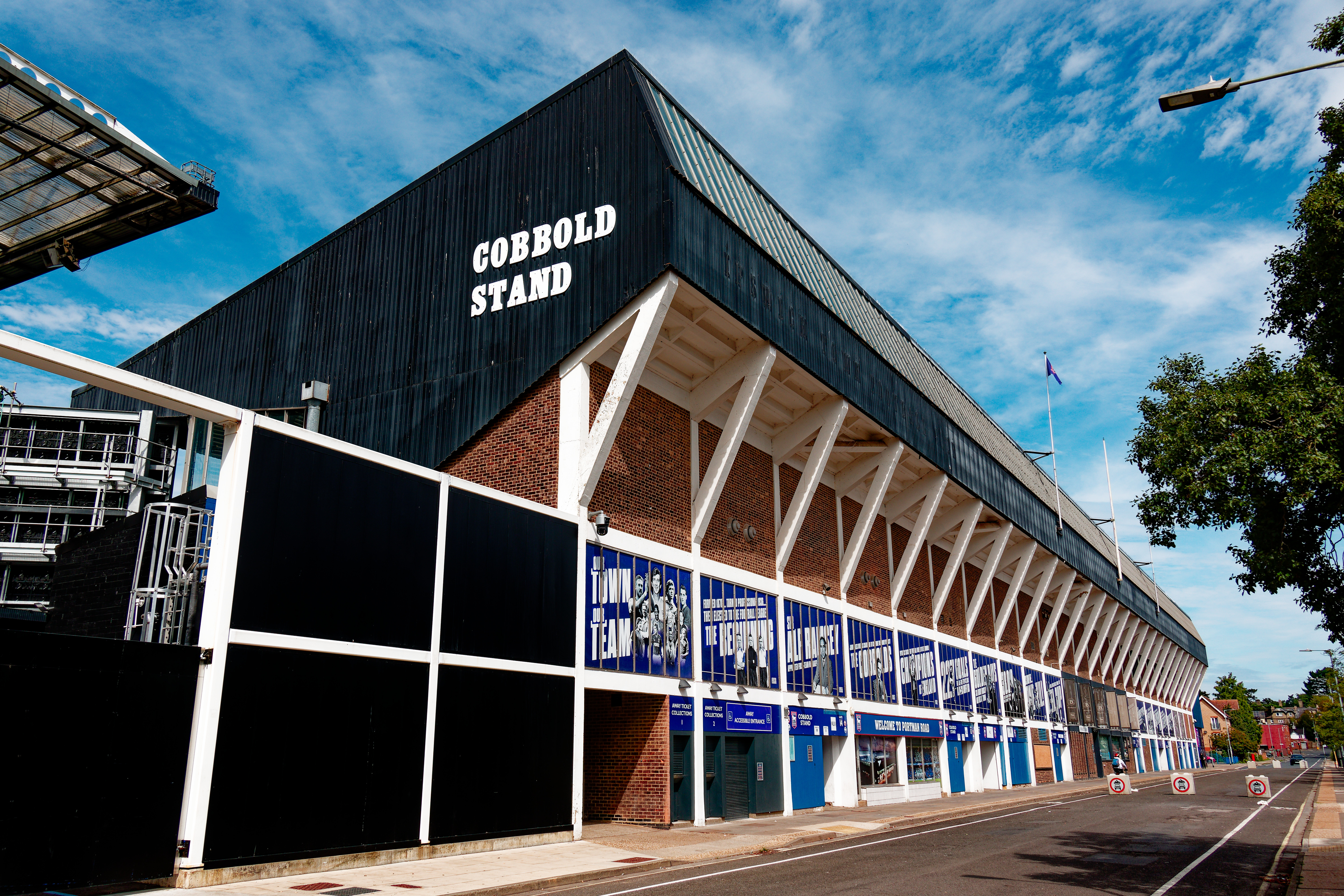
Exterior of the Cobbold Stand

The Cobbold Stand was constructed in 1971 and was previously known as the Portman Stand. With two tiers and a cantilever roof, it is used to accommodate away fans, with an allocation of up to 3,000 seats per game and for family seating. It also contains a number of executive boxes as well as regular seating for home fans.

=== Sir Alf Ramsey Stand ===
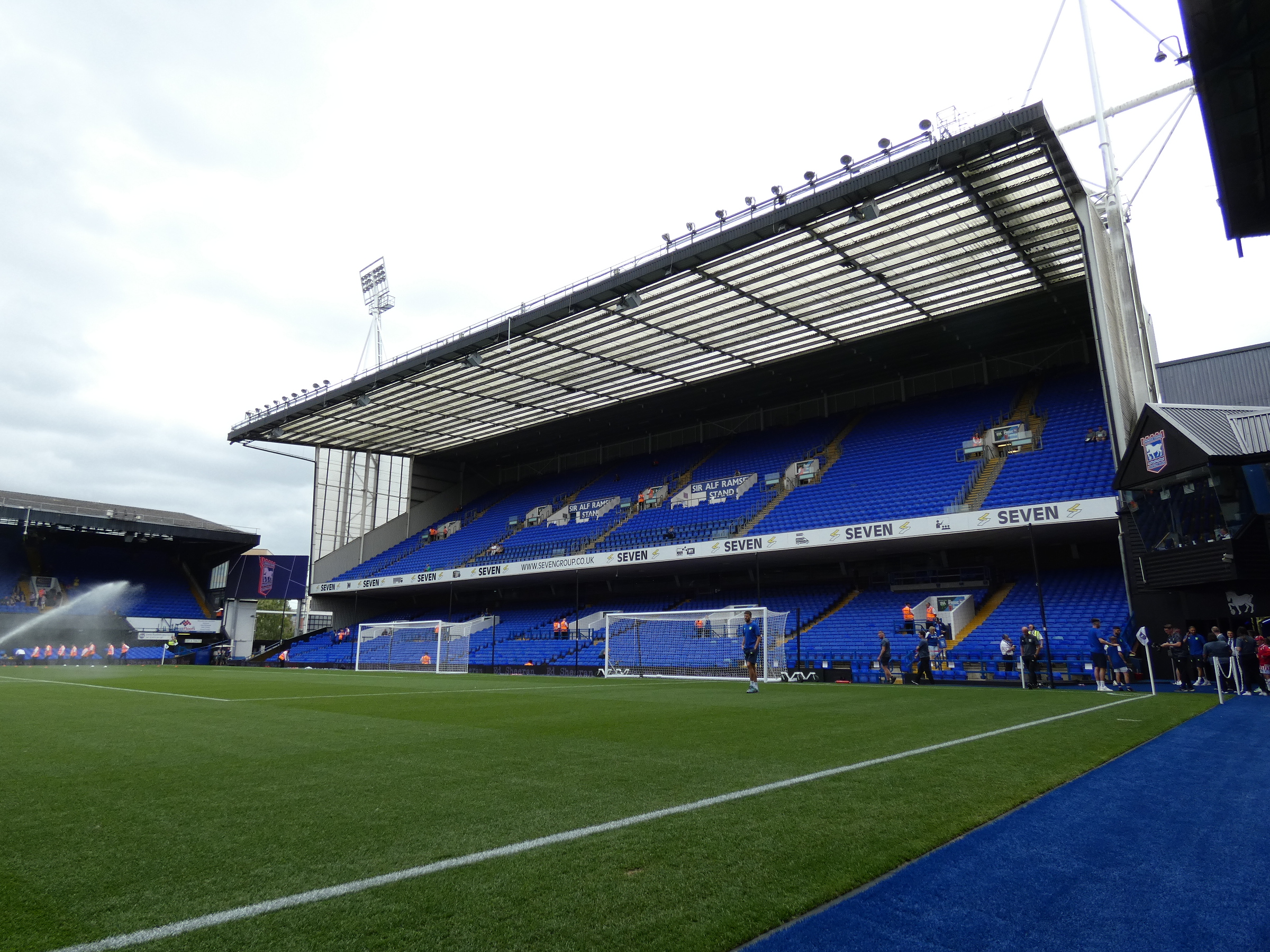
Sir Alf Ramsey Stand

The Sir Alf Ramsey Stand is a two-tiered stand which has a match-day capacity of approximately 7,000. Previously known as the South Stand and the Greene King Stand, it was renamed to its current name in March 2012 in celebration of the 50th anniversary of the club's First Division title win, which Ramsey achieved as manager. Up until 2000, when the stand was completely rebuilt, it was also commonly referred to as the Churchmans Stand after the family who owned the tobacco factory (before John Players Ltd) which stood next to it. It also houses the "Sir Bobby Robson Suite" restaurant and "Legends Bar". The tunnel, from which the players emerge onto the pitch from their dressing rooms, is located in the corner of the stadium between the Sir Alf Ramsey Stand and the West Stand.

=== West Stand ===
The West Stand, first constructed in 1957, was updated to an all-seater stand in 1990 and currently has three tiers consisting of home fan seating and an additional family area. It was previously known as the Pioneer Stand from 1981 to 1999, the Britannia Stand from 1999 to 2012, the East of England Co-operative Stand from 2012 to 2021, and the Magnus Group West Stand from 2021 to 2023. It also contains the directors' box, further executive boxes and the press area. Behind the stand is a full-size AstroTurf pitch which is often used on a casual basis by fans before home games.

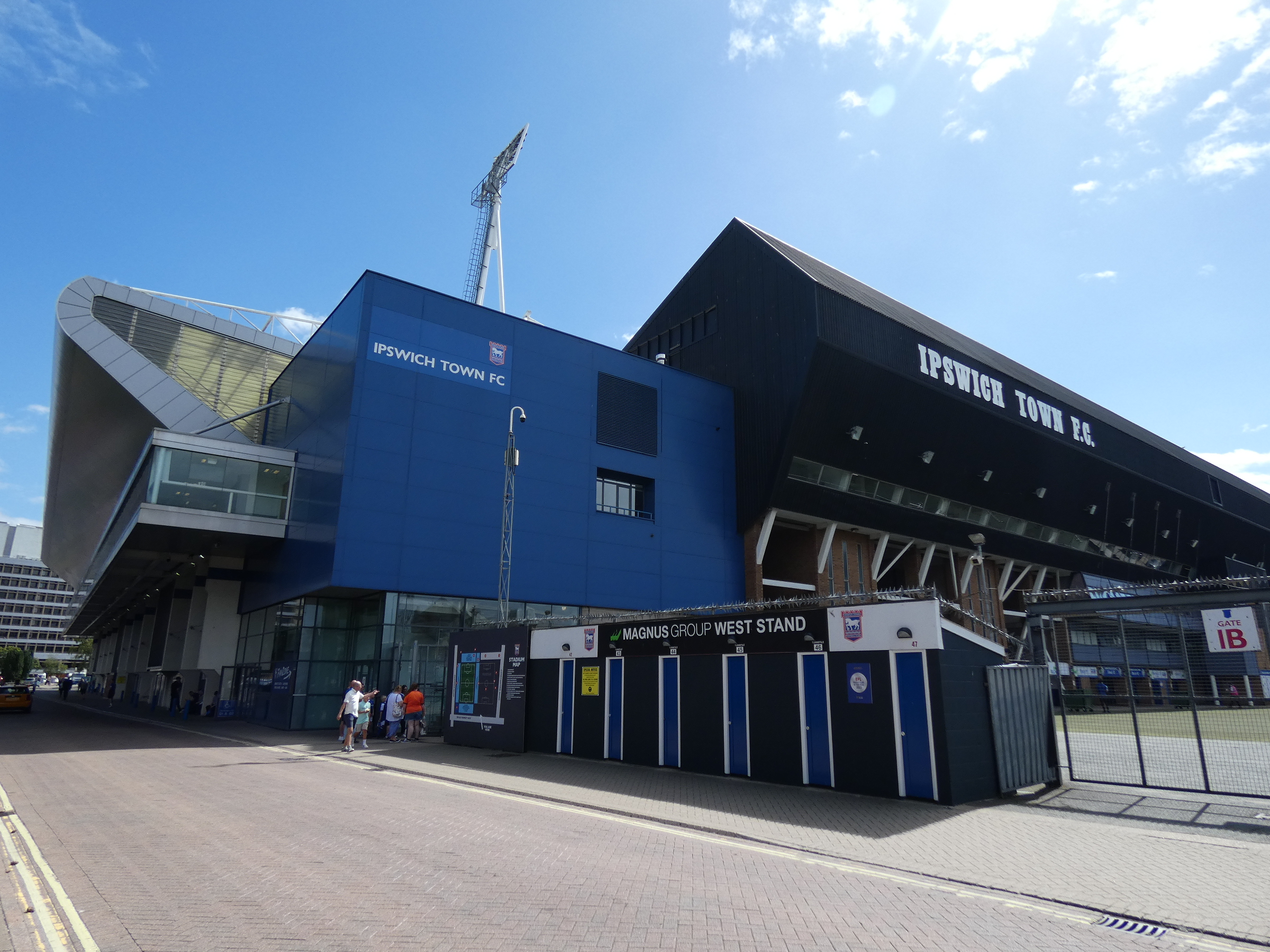
Turnstiles outside the West Stand at Portman Road

There are nine areas throughout the ground designated for disabled supporters, in the lower West Stand, the Sir Alf Ramsey Stand and the Sir Bobby Robson Stand. These provide over 300 spaces to accommodate wheelchair users and ambulant disabled, together with their carers. The ground also provides 12 seats in the West Stand for visually impaired spectators with commentary via individual radio headsets in each seat, provided by local radio station BBC Radio Suffolk.

The former groundsman, Alan Ferguson, received a number of accolades, including both Premiership and Championship Groundsman of the Year, and the pitch was voted the best in the Championship for three consecutive seasons in 2003, 2004 and 2005.

There are statues of Sir Alf Ramsey and Sir Bobby Robson, both former Ipswich Town and England managers, as well a statue of Kevin Beattie, often considered Ipswich Town's greatest ever player, outside the ground. Nearby Portman's Walk was renamed Sir Alf Ramsey Way in 1999.

In May 2026, Ipswich Town submitted plans to expand the West Stand that would increase the concourse size from 864 square metres to 1,759, as well as refurbish the fan zone, automate the turnstiles, increase the amount of car parking spaces, and relocate the kiosks.

== Other uses ==
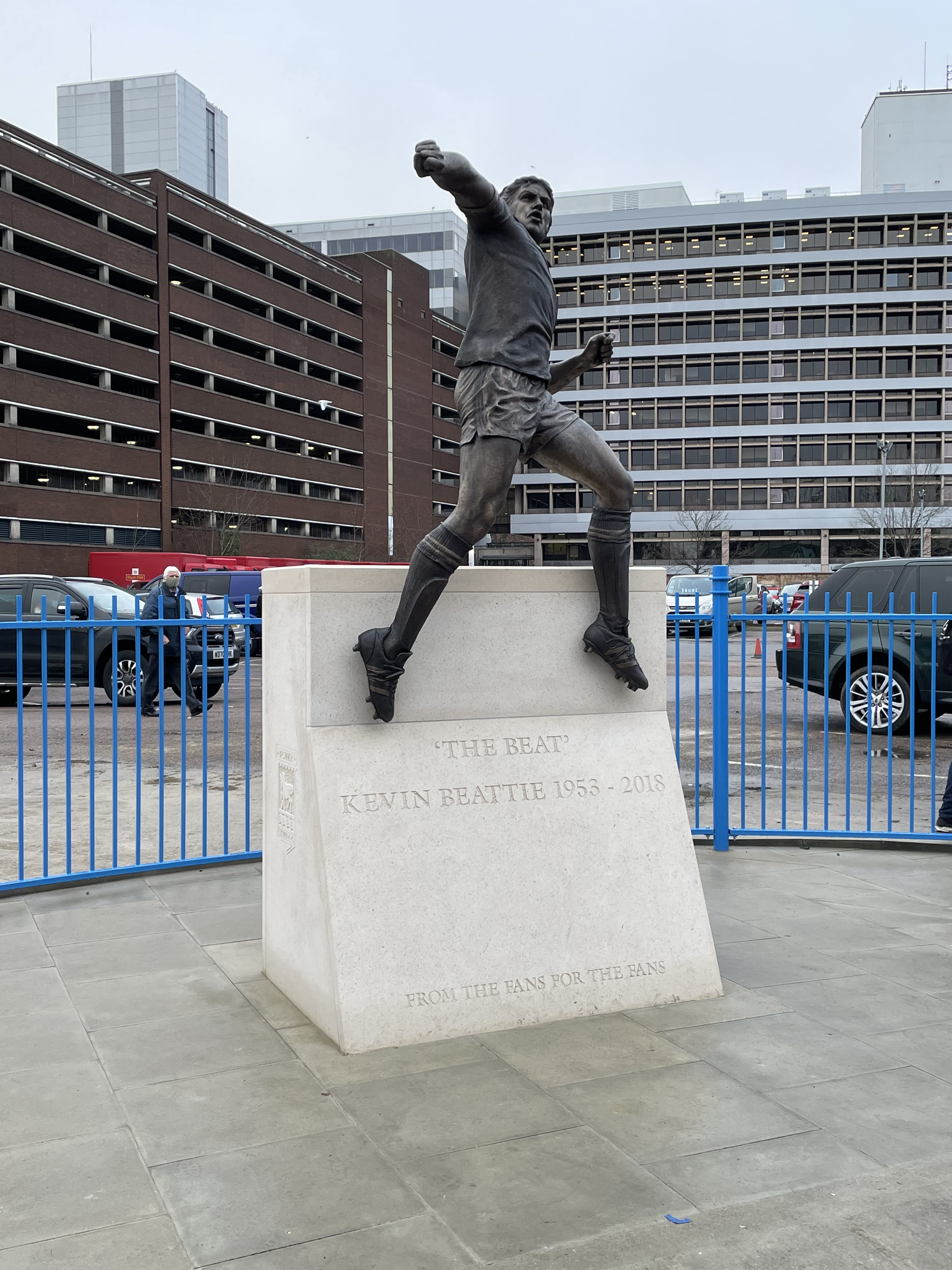
Statue of Ipswich Town legend Kevin Beattie

On 20 August 2003, Portman Road hosted its first and thus far only senior England fixture, a friendly against Croatia, the match finishing 3–1 to England in front of 28,700 spectators. The stadium has been used by England youth teams on a number of occasions, the first on 24 November 1971, saw the England U23 team draw 1–1 with Switzerland. England U21s drew in a UEFA European U21 Championship qualifying match there on 18 August 2006 against Moldova, in front of 13,556 spectators.

During the years when Ipswich were members of the Amateur Football Alliance (AFA), Portman Road was a regular venue for showpiece matches, staging AFA Senior Cup Finals and matches against the Corinthians. It also hosted two AFA international representative matches in 1909 and 1910, with an England XI beating teams representing Bohemia (10–1) and France (20–0).

In addition, a variety of other sports have been hosted at Portman Road, including athletics in 1927, an American football match in 1953, and several international hockey matches in the 1960s and 1970s.

The stadium has also hosted several music concerts, including performances by Elton John, Ed Sheeran, R.E.M., Red Hot Chili Peppers, Pink, Neil Diamond, Tina Turner, and Rod Stewart, among others.

In March 2005, around 8,000 Christians attended a gathering at the stadium, the largest act of Christian worship in Suffolk since Billy Graham, an American evangelist, used Portman Road on part of his Mission England Tour in 1984.

In June 2025, Fabio Wardley defeated Justis Huni by Knockout in the 10th for the Vacant WBA Interim Heavyweight Title in front of over 20,000 Spectators. Wardley then went on to become the WBO Heavyweight Champion by defeating Joseph Parker.

== Records ==
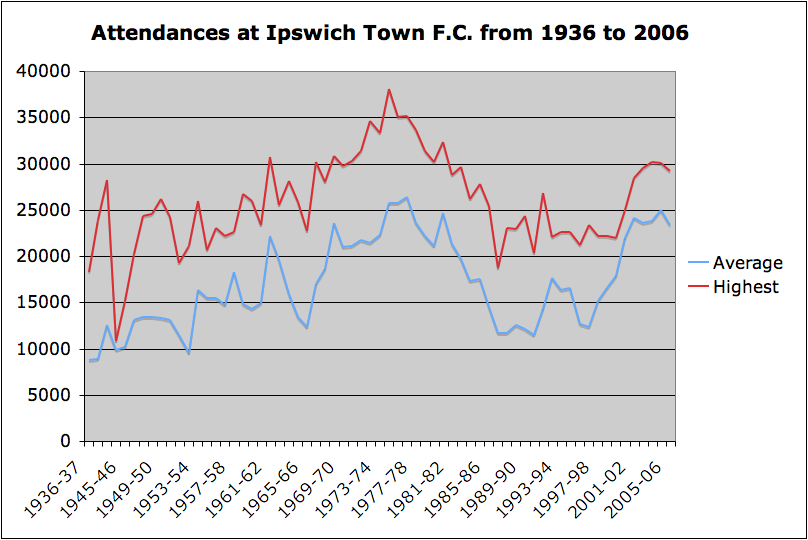
Average and highest attendances at the ground since Ipswich Town turned professional

The highest attendance recorded at Portman Road is 38,010 for a match against Leeds United in the FA Cup sixth round on 8 March 1975. The record modern (all-seated) attendance is 30,152, set on 21 December 2003 against local rivals Norwich City in Football League Division One. The largest crowd for a non-competitive game at the ground was over 23,000 for Bobby Robson's testimonial where Ipswich, including George Best, played against an England XI.

The highest seasonal average at the stadium since Ipswich turned professional was 26,431 in the 1976–77 season while Ipswich were playing in the First Division. The lowest average attendance at Portman Road was 8,741 in the club's inaugural league season, the 1936–37 season in the Southern League. The highest total seasonal attendance was recorded during the 1980–81 season when the aggregate was more than 814,000 during a season in which Ipswich won the UEFA Cup and finished second in the First Division.

Portman Road hosted Ipswich Town's first appearance in European football competition when they defeated Floriana of Malta 10–0, still a club record, in the European Cup in 1962. Since then, Ipswich Town remain undefeated at Portman Road in all European competitions, a total of 31 matches spanning 40 years, a record until it was surpassed by AZ Alkmaar in December 2007.

== Transport ==
The stadium is approximately 450 yards (410 m) from Ipswich railway station, which lies on the Great Eastern Main Line from London Liverpool Street to Norwich. The stadium has parking nearby for supporters, and the streets around the ground are subject to a residents-only permit parking scheme, but there are several pay and display or park and ride car parks within a short distance of the ground.

== See also ==
- List of stadiums in the United Kingdom by capacity
- Lists of stadiums
