= Poverest =

Area of south-east London, England

Coordinates: 51.389971°N 0.100509°E

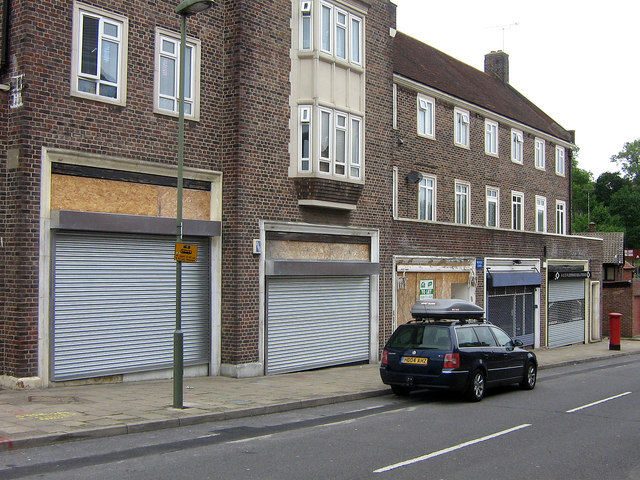
- Ranmore Path shops, Poverest

- Location within Greater London
- London borough: Bromley
- Ceremonial county: Greater London
- Region: London
- Country: England
- Sovereign state: United Kingdom
- Postcode district: BR5
- Police: Metropolitan
- Fire: London
- Ambulance: London
- London Assembly: Bexley and Bromley

Poverest is an area in south-east London, England, within the London Borough of Bromley in Greater London. Prior to 1965 it was within the historic county of Kent. It lies south of St Paul's Cray, west of St Mary Cray, north of Orpington and Broom Hill, and east of Petts Wood.

== History ==
The remains of a Roman bathhouse and Saxon burial ground have been uncovered on Poverest Road. The name is a corruption of Margaret de Pouery, who owned a manorial estate here in the 14th century. Some limited development took place in the 19th century, with cottages being built to house workers in the nearby paper mills, however the area remained a predominantly rural one into the 20th century. Mass house building occurred in the late 1910s-20s, with a shopping parade being built along Marion Crescent.

== Amenities ==
The main shopping area is along Marion Crescent, with a smaller parade located on Tillingbourne Green/Ranmore Path. The main green spaces in the area are Poverest Park, Tillingbourne Green and Robin Hood Green.
