= Colquhoun Grant (British intelligence officer) =

British Army soldier and intelligence officer

Colquhoun Grant CB
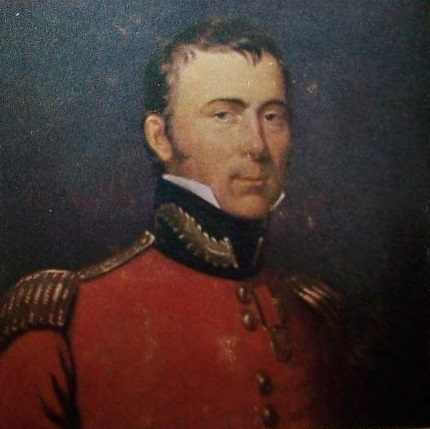
- Born: 1780; Morayshire, Scotland
- Died: 20 October 1829 (aged 48–49); Aachen, Rhine Province, Kingdom of Prussia
- Military career
- Allegiance: United Kingdom
- Branch: British Army
- Service years: 1795–1829
- Rank: Lieutenant-Colonel
- Nickname: Granto bueno
- Unit: 11th Regiment of Foot
- Commands: Corps of Guides; Head of Intelligence; 54th Regiment of Foot
- Conflicts: French Revolutionary Wars; Expedition to Ostend (POW); Napoleonic Wars; West Indies campaign; Peninsular War (POW); Hundred Days; Battle of Waterloo; First Anglo-Burmese War

Lieutenant-Colonel Colquhoun Grant CB (1780 – 20 October 1829) was a British Army soldier and intelligence officer during the Napoleonic Wars.

== Career ==
Of a family from the Scots aristocracy, Grant, the youngest of eight brothers, was commissioned into the 11th Foot in 1795, reaching the rank of major by 1809 when he was posted to the Iberian Peninsula during the Peninsular War under the command of Arthur Wellesley, later Duke of Wellington. In 1810 he was appointed to Wellesley's personal staff as an Exploring Officer in the Peninsula Corps of Guides, a special reconnaissance unit whose members spoke the local languages.

Grant never thought of himself as a spy, and always rode in full uniform, often behind enemy lines, to note the positions and strength of the enemy.

Grant was captured by French forces on 16 April 1812. As he was in uniform, he was treated as an officer and gentleman by his captors, who offered him parole, which Grant accepted. His servant Leon, a local guide, was not so fortunate, and was shot. Grant was invited to dine with Marshal Auguste de Marmont, who hoped to find out more about Wellington, and who was angered by Grant's reticence. Marmont had good reason to remain suspicious of Grant, as the latter managed to send and receive secret messages while in captivity.

Marmont sent Grant to Paris for interrogation. It is clear from Marmont's correspondence that he had no intention of exchanging Grant for a prisoner of equal rank, as was the custom of the time, considering him to be a spy. Grant, on seeing a copy of Marmont's letter, decided that it invalidated his parole agreement and escaped.

Grant was able to pass himself off as an American officer and spent some weeks at liberty in the streets and salons of Paris, sending intelligence reports to Wellington. He then escaped to England, rejoining Wellington in early 1814. Promoted to lieutenant-colonel, he was appointed commanding officer of the Corps of Guides and Head of Intelligence for the Peninsular Army.

During the Hundred Days, Grant worked as an intelligence officer in France until Wellington put him in charge of his own intelligence operations. Grant sent in a steady stream of reports regarding the build-up of French troops along the border and returned to Brussels in time to take part in the Battle of Waterloo on 18 June.

In 1821, Grant transferred to the 54th Foot as lieutenant-colonel, later commanding a brigade in the First Anglo-Burmese War during the difficult Arakan campaign.

In 1829, he was invalided out of the army, and his doctor, Sir James McGrigor, sent him to take the waters at Aachen. On the night of 20 October 1829, he died there.

== Family ==
His son, Walter Colquhoun Grant, also became an army officer, the youngest captain in the army at 24, before financial troubles saw him become an early settler in the Colony of Vancouver Island. He later rejoined the army, serving in the Crimean War and Indian Mutiny.

== Bibliography ==
- Jock Haswell, The First Respectable Spy. The Life and Times of Colquhoun Grant, Wellington's Head of Intelligence, London, Hamish Hamilton, 1969
