= Crofton, London =

Crofton
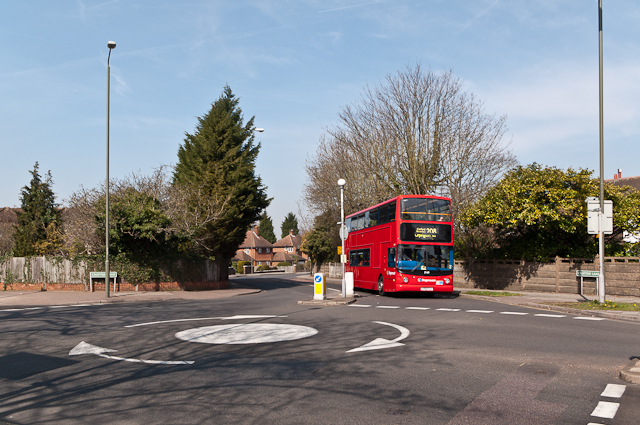
- 208 bus route at Crofton junction

- Location within Greater London
- Population: 14,632 (2011 Census)
- OS grid reference: TQ445658
  - Charing Cross: 13.6 mi (21.9 km) NW
- London borough: Bromley
- Ceremonial county: Greater London
- Region: London
- Country: England
- Sovereign state: United Kingdom
- Post town: ORPINGTON
- Postcode district: BR5, BR6
- Police: Metropolitan
- Fire: London
- Ambulance: London
- UK Parliament: Orpington
- London Assembly: Bexley and Bromley

Crofton is a suburb of Orpington in southeast London, England, located in the London Borough of Bromley in Greater London. Prior to 1965 it was within the historic county of Kent. It is about 13.6 miles (21.9 km) southeast of Charing Cross. It lies south of Petts Wood, west of Orpington and Broom Hill, north of Green Street Green and Farnborough, north-east of Locksbottom and east of Bromley Common.

== History ==
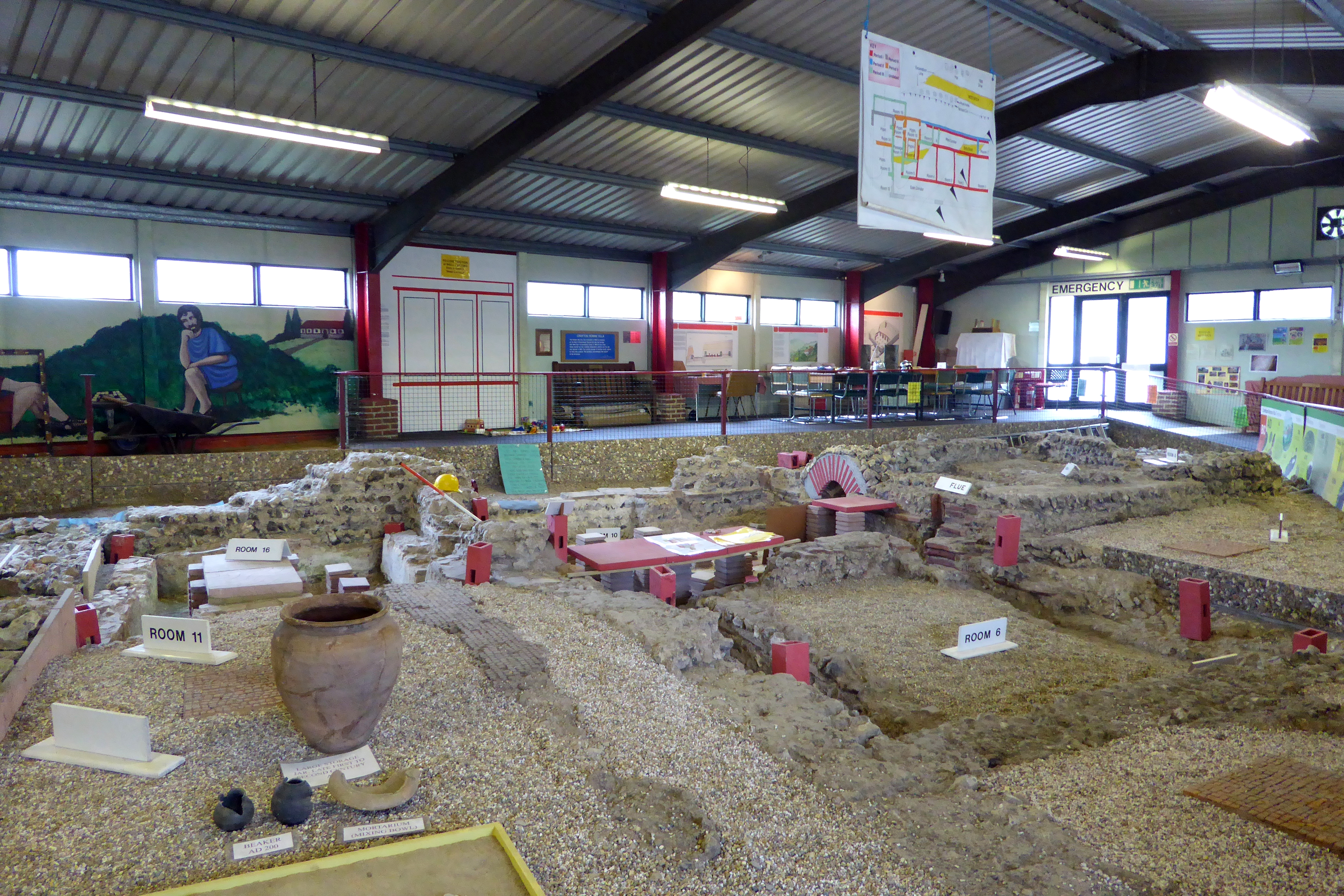
Crofton Roman Villa

A Roman settlement existed here from circa 140 ADs-400, with the ruins of a Roman villa forming a small museum just next to Orpington train station.

The name Crofton comes from Old English and means 'farm on a rounded hill'. Little is known of its subsequent history, though it remained a rural locality until well into the 19th century. Some small-scale development occurred from 1868 following the opening of Orpington train station, and St Paul's Church, Crofton Road was built in 1887 (later rebuilt in 1958). The inter-war years saw extensive development and the area is now effectively a suburban extension of Orpington.

== Amenities ==
The area contains two small shopping parades on Crofton Lane and Kelvin Parade. To the north-west lies Crofton Wood, which is designated a Site of Special Scientific Interest.

== Governance ==
Crofton falls within the London Borough of Bromley and is in the Orpington Parliament constituency. For local council elections it forms a part of the Farnborough and Crofton ward along with Farnborough.

== Demography ==
Demographic data is produced by the Office for National Statistics for the Farnborough and Crofton ward. In the 2011 census, the population for the Farnborough and Crofton ward was 14,632. The most common ethnic group was White British in the Farnborough and Crofton ward, measured at 90.5%, followed by Asian or British Asian (5.5%) and mixed-race (1.9%). The remaining percentage was made up of Black or Black British and other unspecified ethnic groups.

== Transport ==
Crofton has no railway station of its own, but east of Crofton is Orpington railway station which runs on the South Eastern Main Line.

There is good bus infrastructure in Crofton, having six daytime routes, one nighttime route and one school bus route. Buses in Crofton include bus routes 61, 208, 353, N199, R2, R3, R7 and school route 654 with connections to many towns, villages and suburbs such as Biggin Hill, Bromley town centre, Catford, Lewisham town centre, Petts Wood, St Mary Cray and several other areas.

== Gallery ==
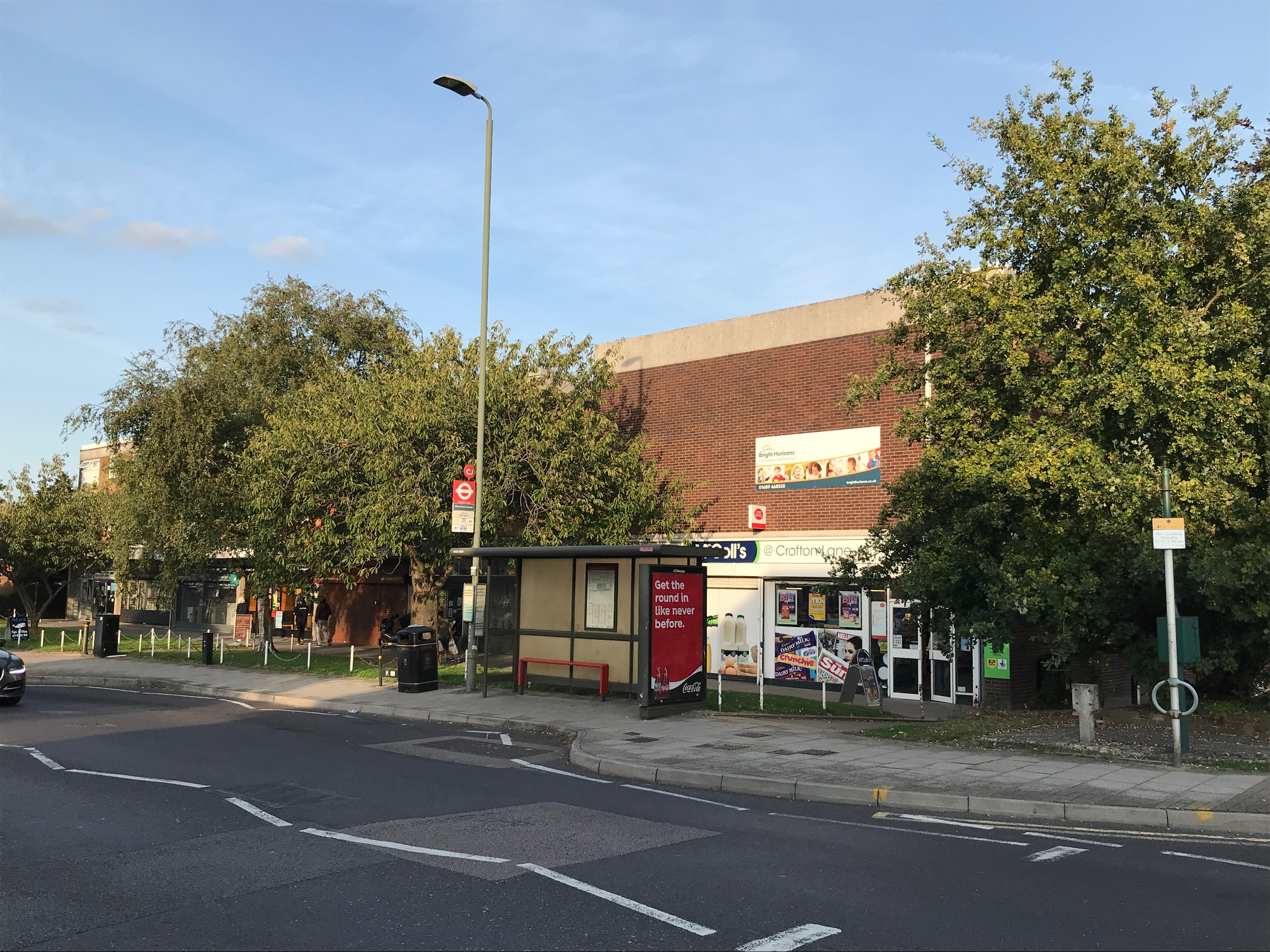
Shops on Crofton Lane

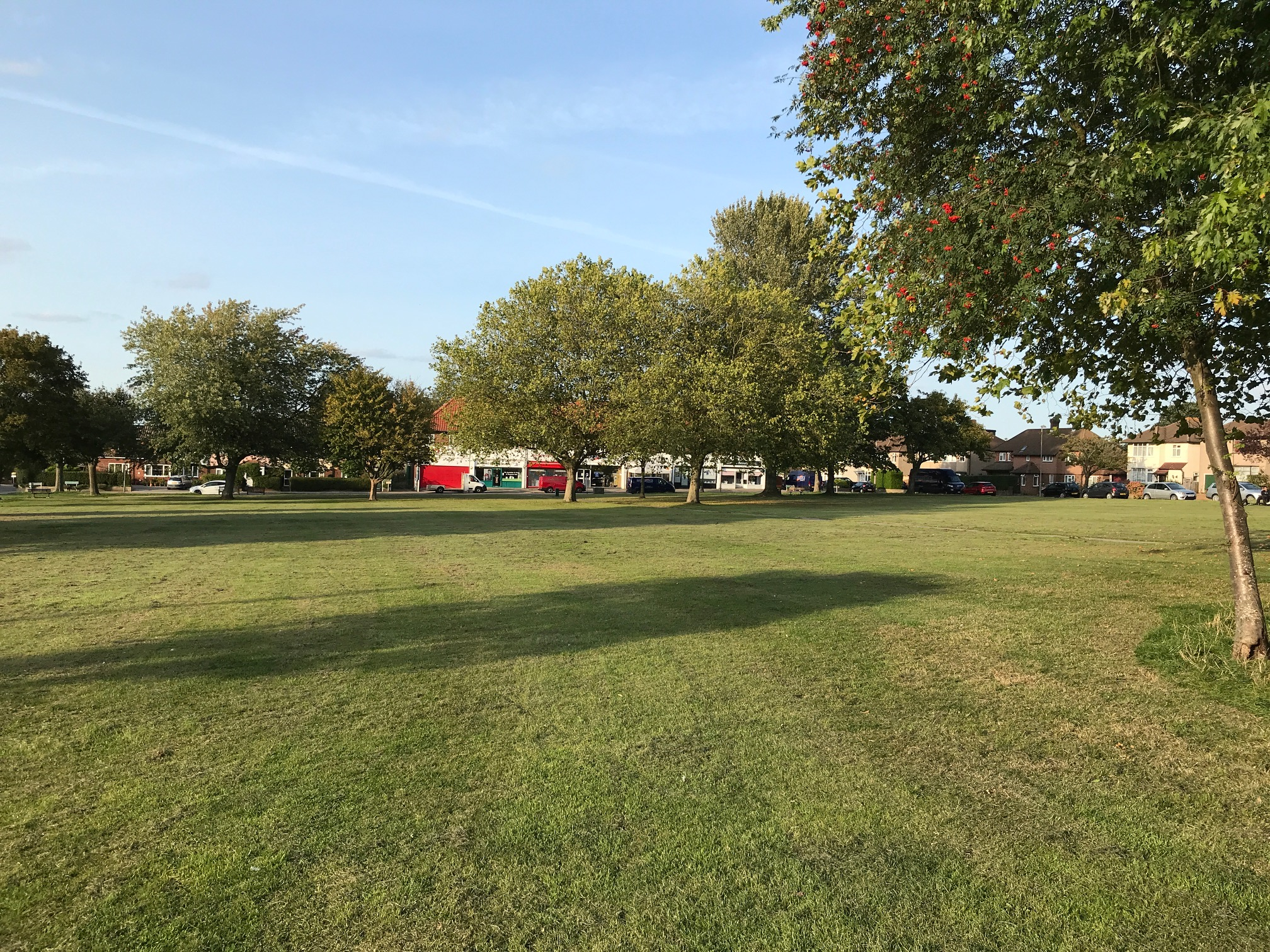
Oregon Square Open Space, with the Kelvin Parade shops at the far end

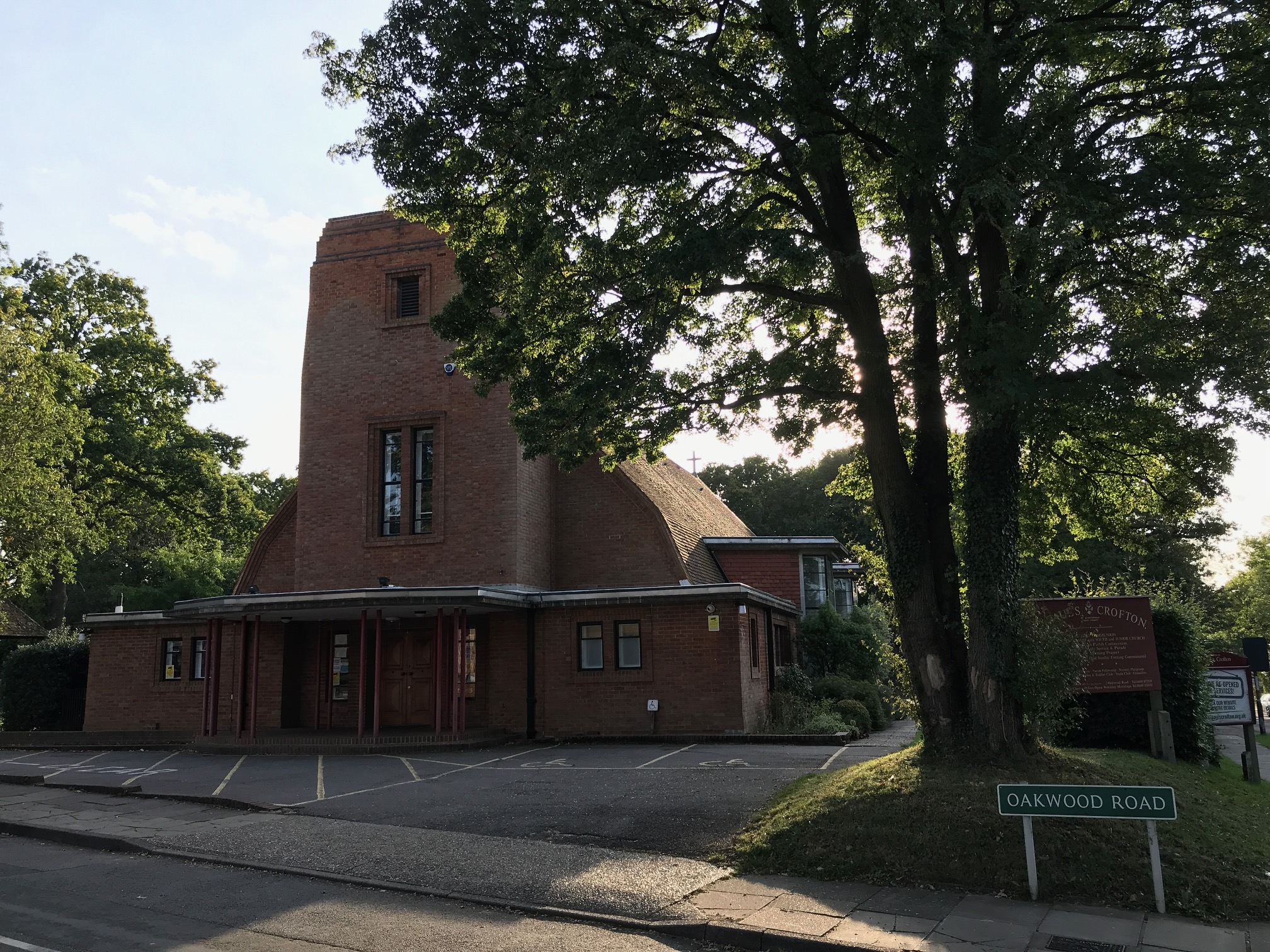
St Paul's Church, built in 1958 by AB Knapp-Fisher

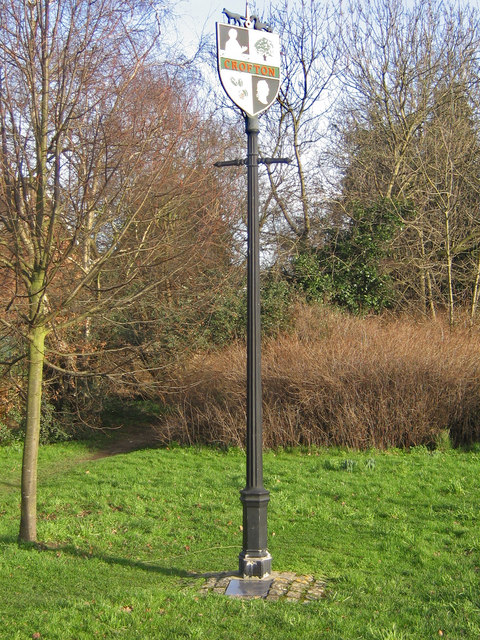
Crofton village sign

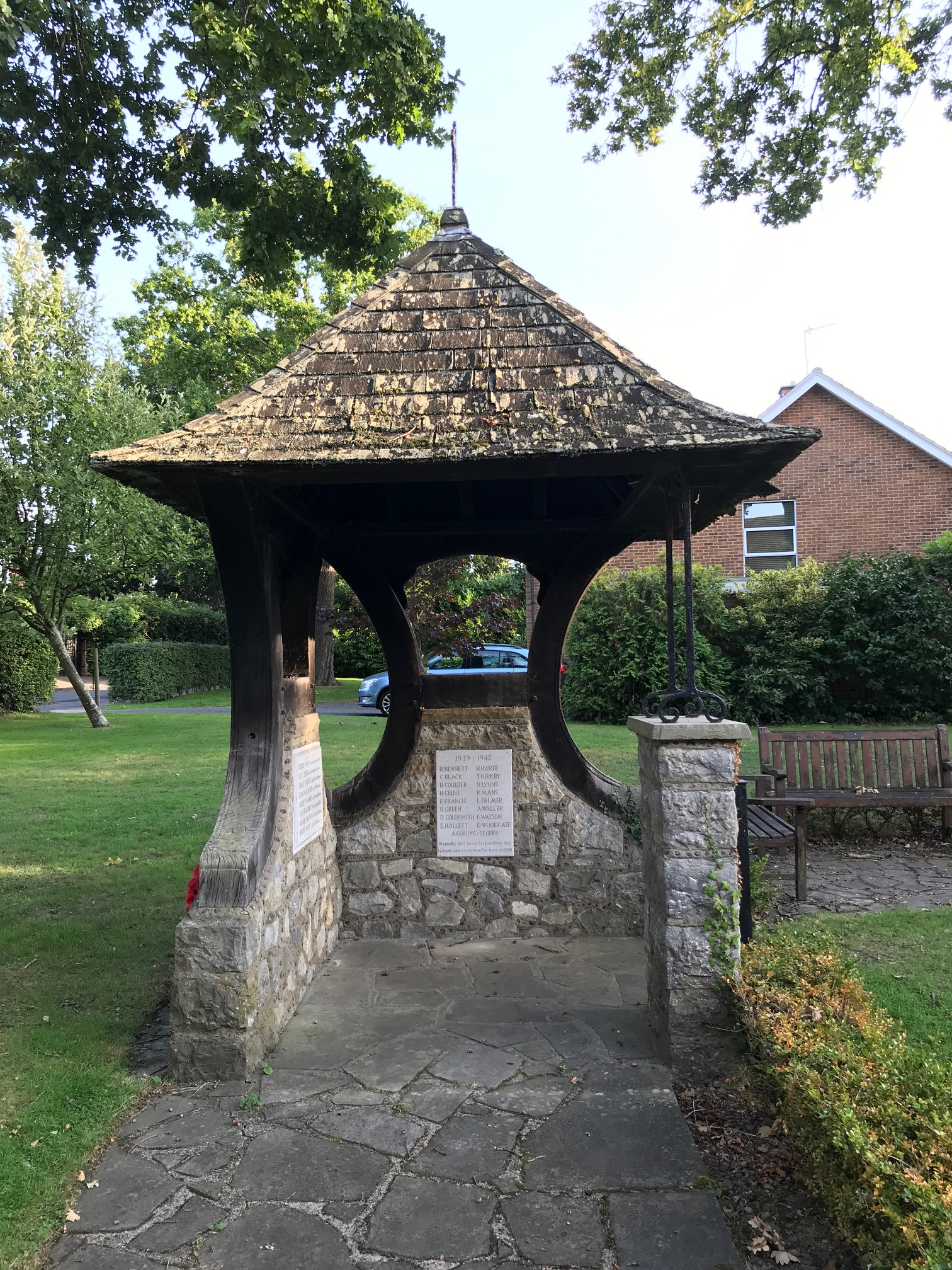
Crofton War Memorial at St Paul's Church

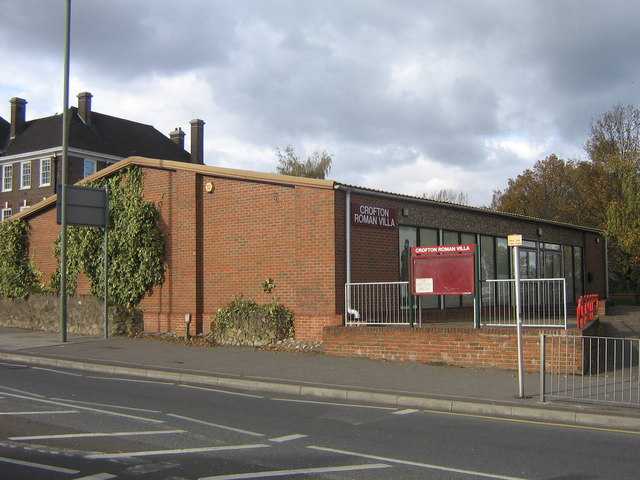
Crofton Roman Villa Museum
