= Jock Haswell =

British Army officer and author (1919–2018)

Major Chetwynd John Drake "Jock" Haswell (18 July 1919 – 21 January 2018), who also wrote as George Foster, was a British military and intelligence author and former British intelligence officer. He was "Author for Service Intelligence" 1966–1984.

== Early life ==
Haswell was born in Penn, Buckinghamshire. He was educated at Little Appley Preparatory School and Winchester College.

== Career ==
Haswell was trained at Sandhurst c. 1938/9 - 1941. He joined the Queen's Royal Regiment on 3 April 1941. Later in 1941 he was stationed in India, and saw local action. He was promoted Major on 3 July 1952, and retired from the army on 29 April 1960.

Haswell's later work was mostly writing, continuing a thread from his military and intelligence work. He self-deprecatingly described his books as "holes held together with string". Nonetheless, his James II, for example, was reviewed in the Times of 29 July 1972 by Geoffrey Homes.

He died on 21 January 2018 at the age of 98.

== Bibliography ==
=== Books ===
- Indian File (Michael Joseph, 1960) - as 'George Foster'
- Soldier on Loan (Michael Joseph, 1961) - as 'George Foster'
- The Queen's Royal Regiment (West Surrey) (Hamish Hamilton, 1967)
- The First Respectable Spy : The Life and Times of Colquhoun Grant, Wellington's Head of Intelligence (Hamish Hamilton, 1969)
- James II Soldier and Sailor (Hamish Hamilton, 1972)
- Citizen Armies (Peter Davies, 1973)
- British Military Intelligence (Weidenfeld & Nicolson, 1973)
- The British Army: A Concise History (Thames & Hudson, 1975)
- The Ardent Queen: Margaret of Anjou and the Lancastrian Heritage (Peter Davies, 1976)
- The Battle for Empire: A Century of Anglo-French Conflict (Cassell, 1976)
- Spies and Spymasters: A Concise History of Intelligence (Thames & Hudson, 1977)
- The Intelligence and Deception of the D-Day Landings (Batsford, 1979) also published in the US as D-Day : Intelligence and Deception, New York
- The Tangled Web: The Art of Tactical and Strategic Deception (J. Goodchild, 1985)
- The Magnet Book of Spies and Spying (Methuen, 1986)

=== Articles ===
- Combined Arms Center (September 1976). "The need to know". Military Review. Fort Leavenworth, Kansas.
