= Crofton Wood =

Nature reserve in London, England

Coordinates: 51.379°N 0.063°E

Crofton Woods
- Site of Special Scientific Interest
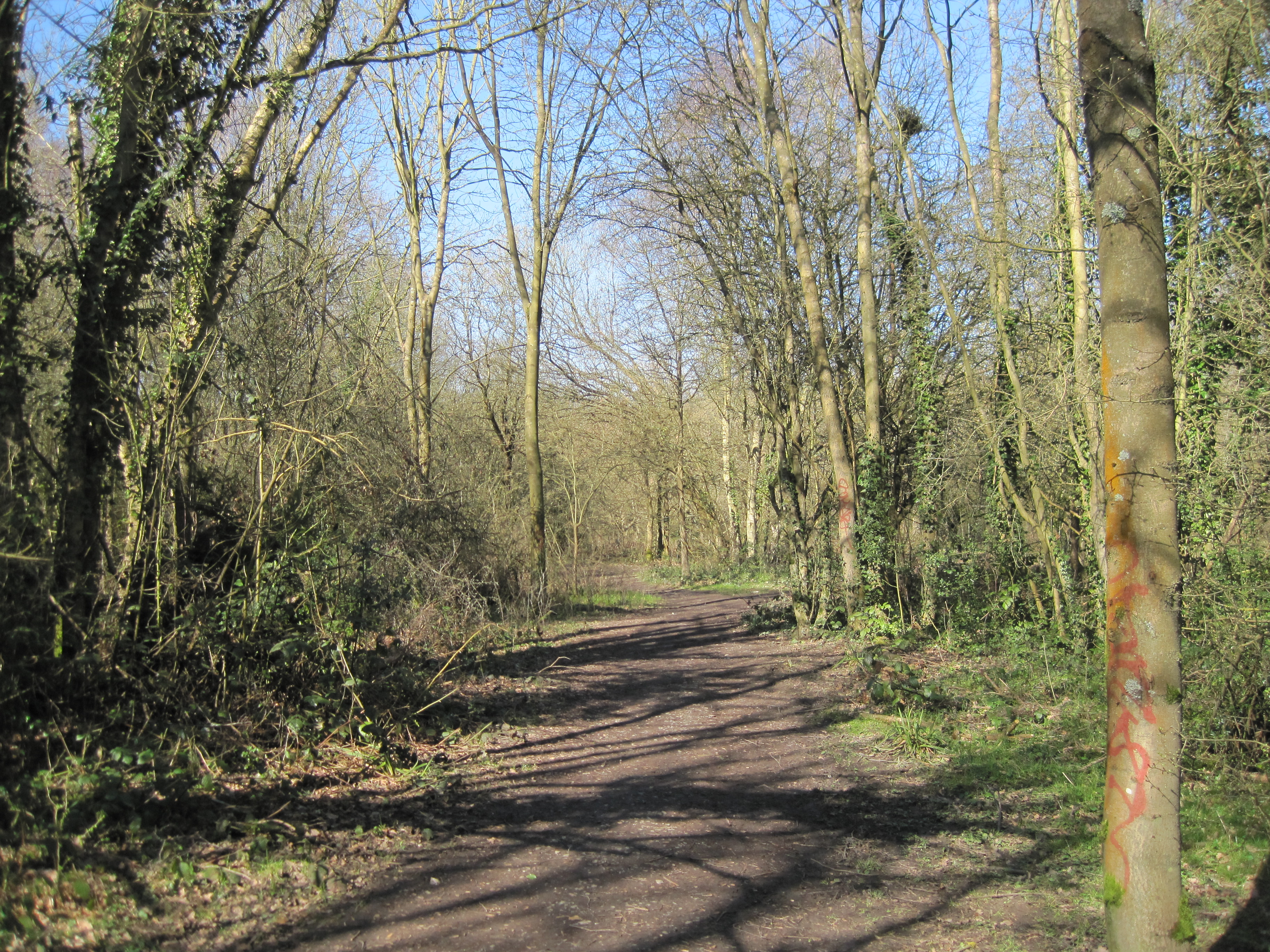
- Location of Crofton Woods.
- Area of search: Greater London
- Grid reference: TQ437665
- Interest: Biological
- Area: 76.6 ha (189 acres)
- Notification date: 1989
- Location map: Magic Map

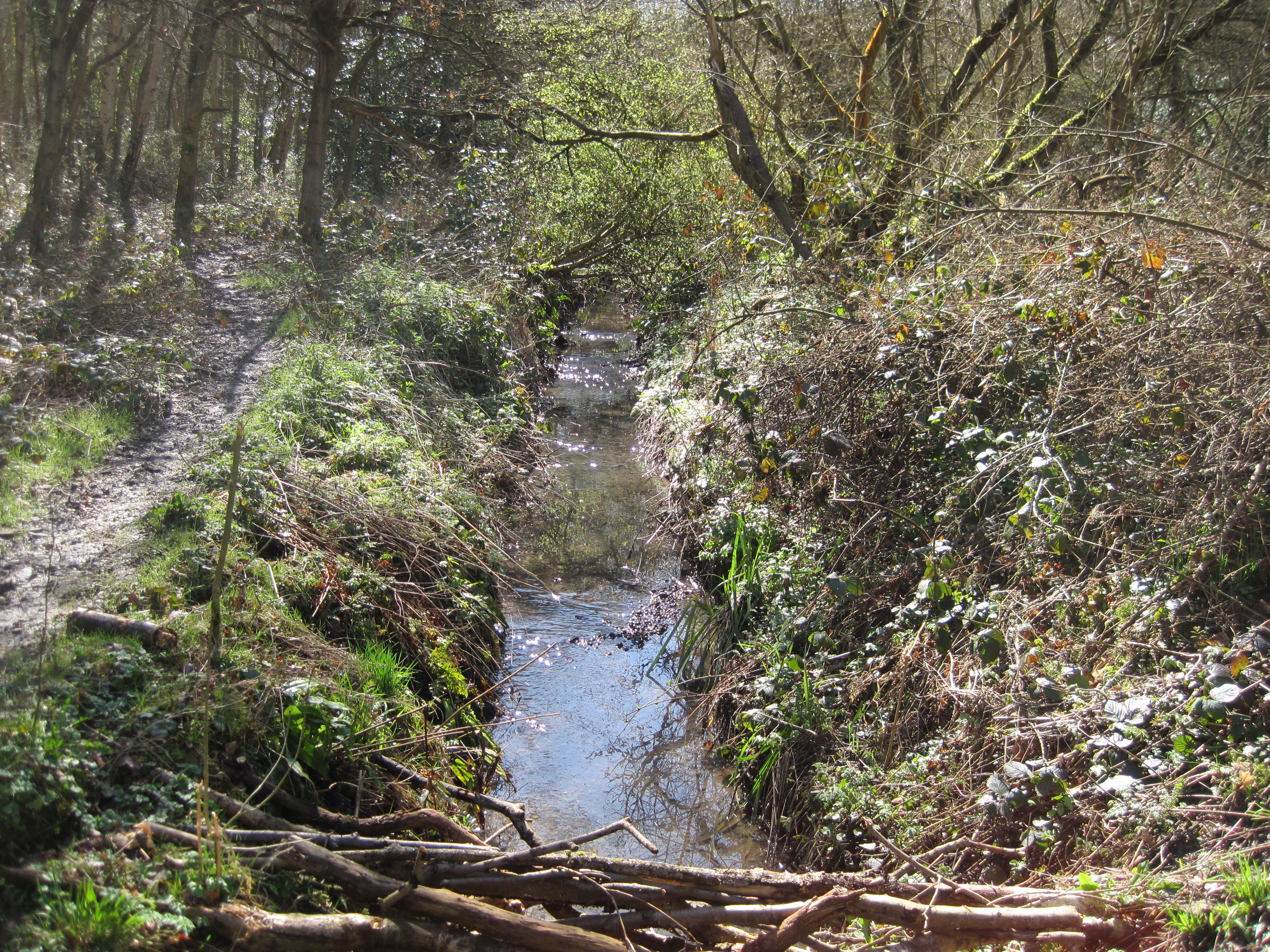
Kyd Brook in Crofton Wood

Crofton Wood or Crofton Woods is a Site of Special Scientific Interest and Site of Metropolitan Importance for Nature Conservation in Crofton in the London Borough of Bromley. Kyd Brook goes through the Wood.

It is a large area of ancient woodland on London Clay, which supports many types of trees, shrubs and herbs. Trees in the ancient wood are mainly oak and hazel, with a central area of former fields. It has high botanical diversity, including fourteen species of sedge, and a rich invertebrate fauna.

The London Loop goes through the Wood, and there is access from a range of different points round the woodland.

== See also ==
- List of Sites of Special Scientific Interest in Greater London
