= Broom Hill, Hadleigh =

Protected area in Suffolk, England

Coordinates: 52.043°N 0.944°E

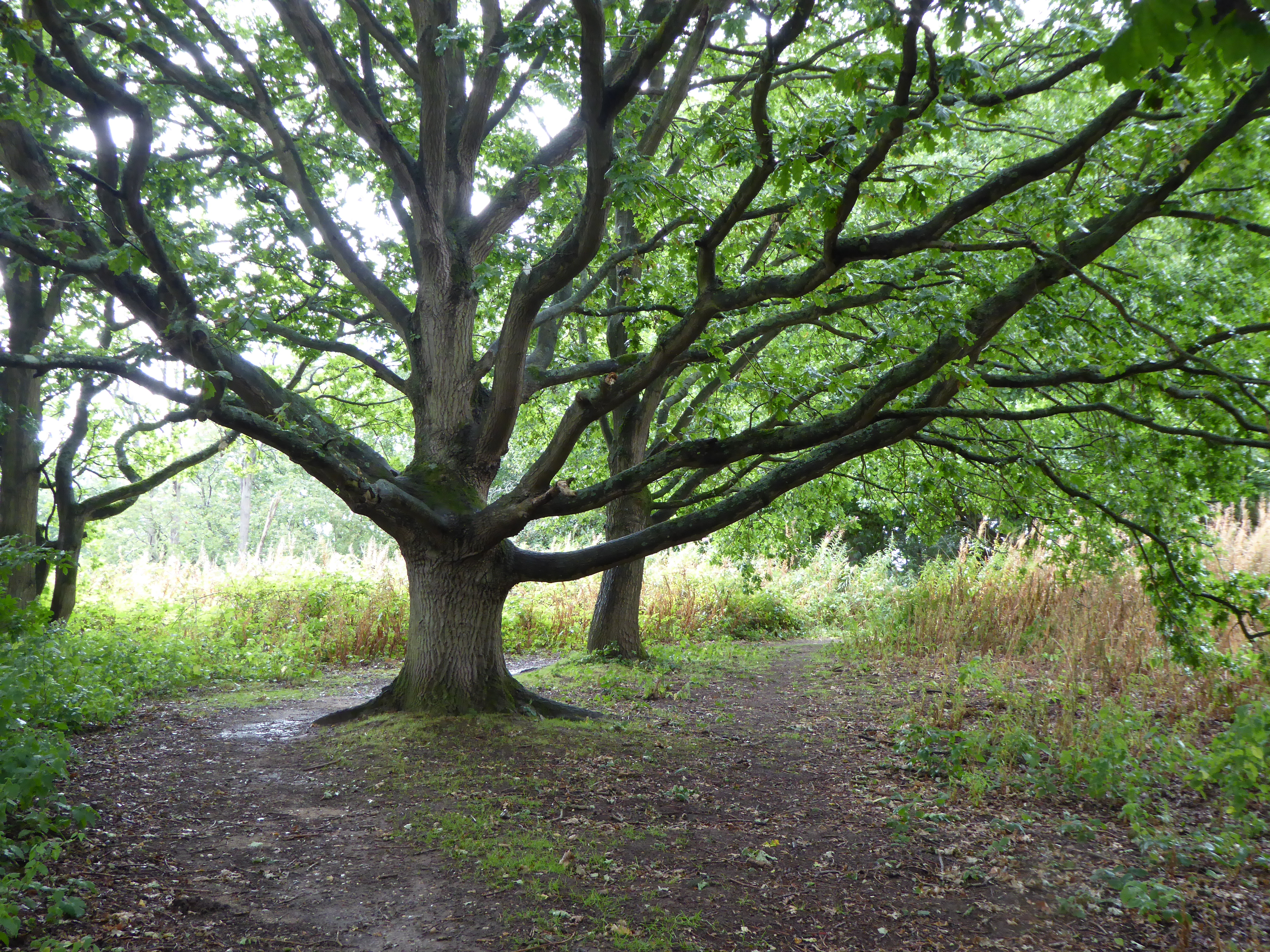
- Interactive map of Broom Hill, Hadleigh
- Type: Local Nature Reserve
- Location: Hadleigh, Suffolk
- OS grid: TM 020 424
- Area: 9.6 hectares (24 acres)
- Manager: Babergh District Council

Broom Hill, Hadleigh is a 9.6 hectares (24 acres) Local Nature Reserve in Hadleigh in Suffolk. It is owned and managed by Babergh District Council.

This former quarry is now covered with woodland, grassland and scrub. There are many ancient trees, together with pollarded oaks and small-leaved limes, which had high branches removed, and coppiced hazel and lime trees, which were cut at ground level.

There is access by a footpath from Riverside Walk.
