= Broom Hill, County Durham =

Hamlet in County Durham, England

Coordinates: 54°53′07″N 1°50′02″W

Broom Hill (or Broomhill) is a hamlet in County Durham, England. It is situated to the north of Consett, near Ebchester and Medomsley.
