= Broom Hill, Greater Victoria =

Hill and human settlement in British Columbia, Canada

Coordinates: 48°23′09″N 123°45′34″W

Broom Hill is a hill and eponymous rural neighbourhood in Sooke, British Columbia. Its residential subdivisions surround Broom Hill proper, which is composed of gabbro which rises to an elevation of 283 metres (928 feet). Above the subdivisions, most of the terrain has a forest cover dominated by Douglas-fir.

== Trails ==
At the top of Broom Hill is a swing looking out over Sooke Harbour and the Juan de Fuca Strait. There are three access points to the trail Blanchard Rd, Mountain Heights Dr and Denfield Rd. Map

Hikers and bikers regularly travel the trails, but they are not marked, and cell phone service is weak.

== Where Broom Hill Got Its Name ==
In the 1850's Captain Walter Colquhoun Grant was scouting for new lumber markets in Hawaii when the wife of a Scottish consul gifted him with a packet of Scotch Broom seeds. Grant brought the seeds to his Sooke homestead and planted them in the fertile ground at the bottom of what is now known as Broom Hill.

Now considered an invasive, Scotch Broom can be found growing all along the pacific coastline from Alaska to California.
