= Broomhall =

Broomhall may refer to:

- Broomhall, Cheshire, England
- Broomhall (surname)
- Broomhall House, near Dunfermline, Fife, Scotland

== See also ==
- Broom Hall, building in Sheffield, England
- Broomhill, Sheffield, district in South Yorkshire, England
- Broomhill (disambiguation)
