= Walter Colquhoun Grant =

British Army officer (1822–1861)

- Born: 27 May 1822; Edinburgh, Scotland (Great Britain / United Kingdom)
- Died: 27 August 1861 (aged 39); British India
- Known for: First non-Hudson's Bay Company settler in Colony of Vancouver Island (future province of British Columbia, Dominion of Canada)
- Relatives: Colquhoun Grant (father)

Walter Colquhoun Grant (27 May 1822 – 27 August 1861) was a British Army officer and a pioneer settler in the former Oregon Country (shared / temporarily jointly occupied with the Americans of the United States) in western British North America on the continent of North America. What is today the Province of British Columbia along the Pacific Ocean coast in the future Dominion of Canada (after 1867). He served briefly as a colonial surveyor but left after a few years to rejoin the Army. He died while in the military service in Saugor (now Sagar, Madhya Pradesh), Bengal, in British India (British Empire), (future Republic of India after 1947) at the young age of 39 years old.

== Early life ==
Grant was born in Edinburgh on 27 May 1822 into a military family, his father, Colquhoun Grant, having been chief of intelligence for Arthur Wellesley, 1st Duke of Wellington during the Napoleonic Wars. Grant first joined the British Army sometime before 7 April 1843 when he was promoted, by purchase, to lieutenant in the 2nd Dragoons (Royal Scots Greys), having previously served in the regiment as a cornet. He purchased the rank of captain on 18 April 1845.

== Settlement in the colony ==
Grant was the youngest captain in the British Army at age 24 when he lost his fortune and started anew by buying 200 acres (0.81 km^{2}) of land from the Hudson's Bay Company at what would become Sooke, British Columbia. Although some sources claim he left the army altogether, the London Gazette shows that initially at least he merely transferred to the 47th Regiment of Foot. This would have raised a certain amount of capital, as cavalry commissions were more expensive than those in infantry regiments.

Vancouver Island was first opened to settlement by the Hudson's Bay Company in 1849. At the outset there was little interest because of land cost (£1 per acre compared to free in the Oregon Territory) and because of the requirement that settlers bring other workers or families with them. Grant was the only settler to make the commitment initially and became the first independent colonist to settle on the island. He sent 8 settlers on in advance and upon his arrival in 1849 he is said to have shot a cow believing it to be a buffalo. Although he lacked the necessary skills, he was employed by the HBC as its first surveyor. He resigned that role in March 1850 without completing a single survey.

Following his arrival, he cleared some of the land he had purchased and set up a sawmill. The land was located 40 kilometres (25 mi) from Fort Victoria. Grant left the colony in 1850 to prospect for gold in Oregon and came back in 1853 to sell his land.

== Achievements ==
While in the colony he collected data about the flora, fauna, natives and trade the later published in Journal of the Royal Geographical Society and did a map of Vancouver Island drawn by John Arrowsmith. He reported the population in 1853 was 450 people, 300 at Victoria, 125 at Nanaimo and the remainder at Fort Rupert. He ignored native peoples in his count.

In addition to being the first to bring non-HBC settlers to the Colony of Vancouver Island, Grant is credited with bringing the first sports event, cricket, to what is now British Columbia when he arrived in 1849.

He introduced what is now considered a noxious, invasive plant, common broom, to the island.

== Later life ==
On 1 August 1854 he was appointed Captain Commandant (though confusingly he was also granted local rank as major) of a detachment of the Mounted Staff Corps to serve with a part of the British Army that was being deployed to Turkey in advance of what would eventually become the Crimean War. He was promoted local lieutenant colonel on 27 October 1855. He was granted regimental rank as a cornet in the 2nd Dragoon Guards on 30 November 1855, and promoted to lieutenant on 16 June 1857. He was awarded the Turkish decoration of the Order of the Medjidieh, 4th Class for his service. The conflict in Crimea over, he served in India. He was brigade major at Lucknow, and during the Indian Mutiny commanded 1st Hodson's Horse. He died in India at the age of 39.
