= Broomhill Park =

Woodland park in Ipswich, Suffolk

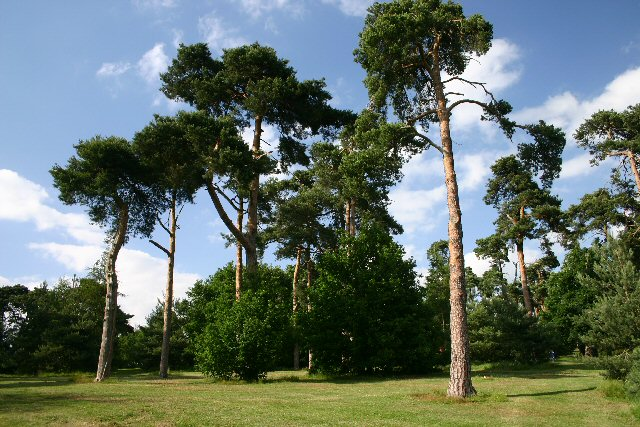
- Interactive map of Broomhill Park
- Type: Public woodland park
- Location: Ipswich, Suffolk
- Coordinates: 52.0691°N 1.1442°E
- Created: 1925 private land sold
- Operator: Ipswich Borough Council
- Open: All year

Broomhill Park is a semi-natural woodland park between Sherrington Road and Valley Road in Ipswich, Suffolk, England. In older times it was called Broom Hill.

The park contains many fine historic oaks and an abundance of Scots Pines. The park contains Broomhill Pool, a Grade II listed lido, which the Broomhill Pool Trust is campaigning to re-open.

== History ==
For many years this was a privately owned hilltop wood on the outskirts of Ipswich called Broom Hill. In the 19th and early 20th century the land between the hill and Norwich Road was sold for housing. Broom Hill Road for example was built in 1888.

In 1925 George Sherrington sold Broom Hill to Ipswich Borough Council.

A ring road around Ipswich was built in 1926 and Valley Road then divided the woodland in half, with a larger piece to the North of Valley Road, and a smaller piece to the South.

== Football ground ==
The park has historical importance for Ipswich Town Football Club.

Ipswich Town Association Football Club played their first matches from 1877 to 1883 at Broomhill. The land was owned by George Sherrington, who was a driving force in forming and administering the club in its first 20 years. George Sherrington and his brother, William, who were educated at Ipswich School, both played for Ipswich Town Association FC in the 1870s and 1880s. The players used a shed at the Inkerman Pub across the road as a dressing room.

In 1883 when Ipswich Town AFC moved to its ground at Portman Road, the Broomhill ground was used by the rugby club.

In 1888 ITAFC merged with Ipswich Rugby Club to form Ipswich Town Football Club.

== Facilities ==
The park has no facilities as such, as it is just semi-natural woodland. The park is popular for walkers, dog walkers, bird and insect spotting; and for children, who can play in natural sandpits, tree roots, and lush grass.

A public library called Broomhill Library, on Sherrington Road, backs onto the park. The building is believed to have been built as a decontamination unit in 1938.
