= Broom Hill, London =

Coordinates: 51.380878°N 0.098109°E

Broom Hill
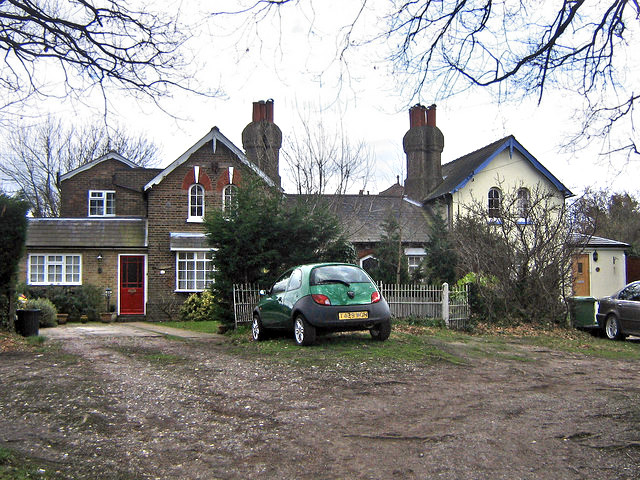
- Cottages, Broom Hill

- Location within Greater London
- London borough: Bromley
- Ceremonial county: Greater London
- Region: London
- Country: England
- Sovereign state: United Kingdom
- Post town: ORPINGTON
- Postcode district: BR6
- Police: Metropolitan
- Fire: London
- Ambulance: London
- London Assembly: Bexley and Bromley

Broom Hill, sometimes spelt Broomhill, is a suburb of Orpington in southeast London, England, located in the London Borough of Bromley in Greater London. Prior to 1965 it was within the historic county of Kent. It lies south of Poverest, west of Orpington High Street, north-east of Crofton, and south-east of Petts Wood.

== History ==
Broom Hill takes its name from a shrub located on the hill that was used to make brooms. It was historically a rural locality, noted only for its broom and bonnet-making industries. In 1819 a Zion Chapel was built on Devonshire Road, however this was later converted to cottages and then the cottages torn down in 1935. In the early 20th century housing development began in the southern part of the area, including a golf course, to cater for commuters using Orpington railway station. Further development occurred, and the golf course was built over, with the area losing its rural character completely and merging into Orpington and the surrounding suburbs.

Nowadays the area essentially forms a western suburb of Orpington, centred on Broom Hill Common, which is protected under the Commons Preservation Act 1965. There is one pub - The Cricketers - located here, a very small row of shops on Fordwich Close, and further shops lining Chislehurst Road.

== Notable people ==
- Malcolm Campbell (1885-1948) - British racing motorist who set the world speed record on land and on water in the 1920-30s, practised flying from Broom Hill in the 1910s.

== Gallery ==
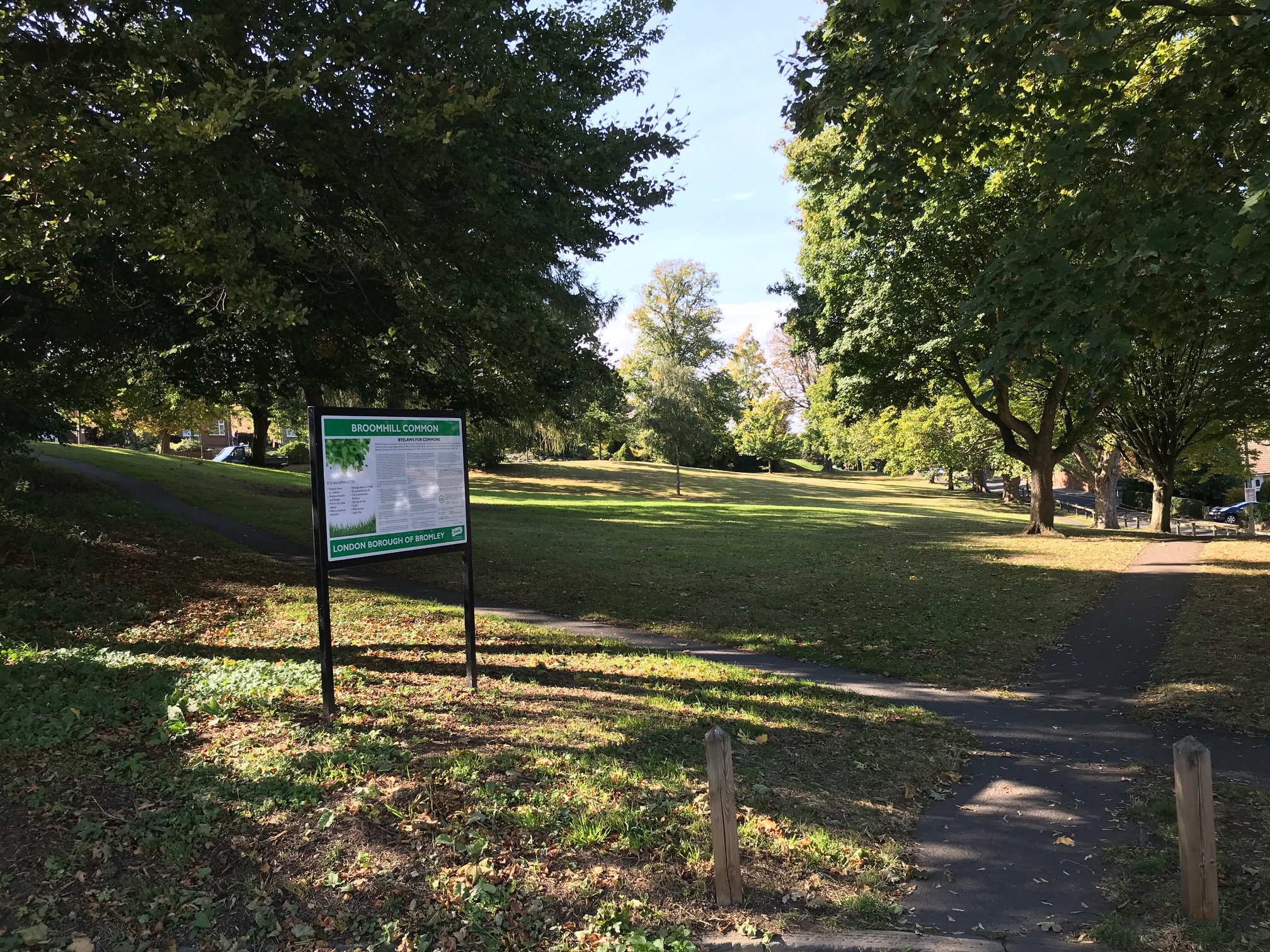
Broom Hill Common

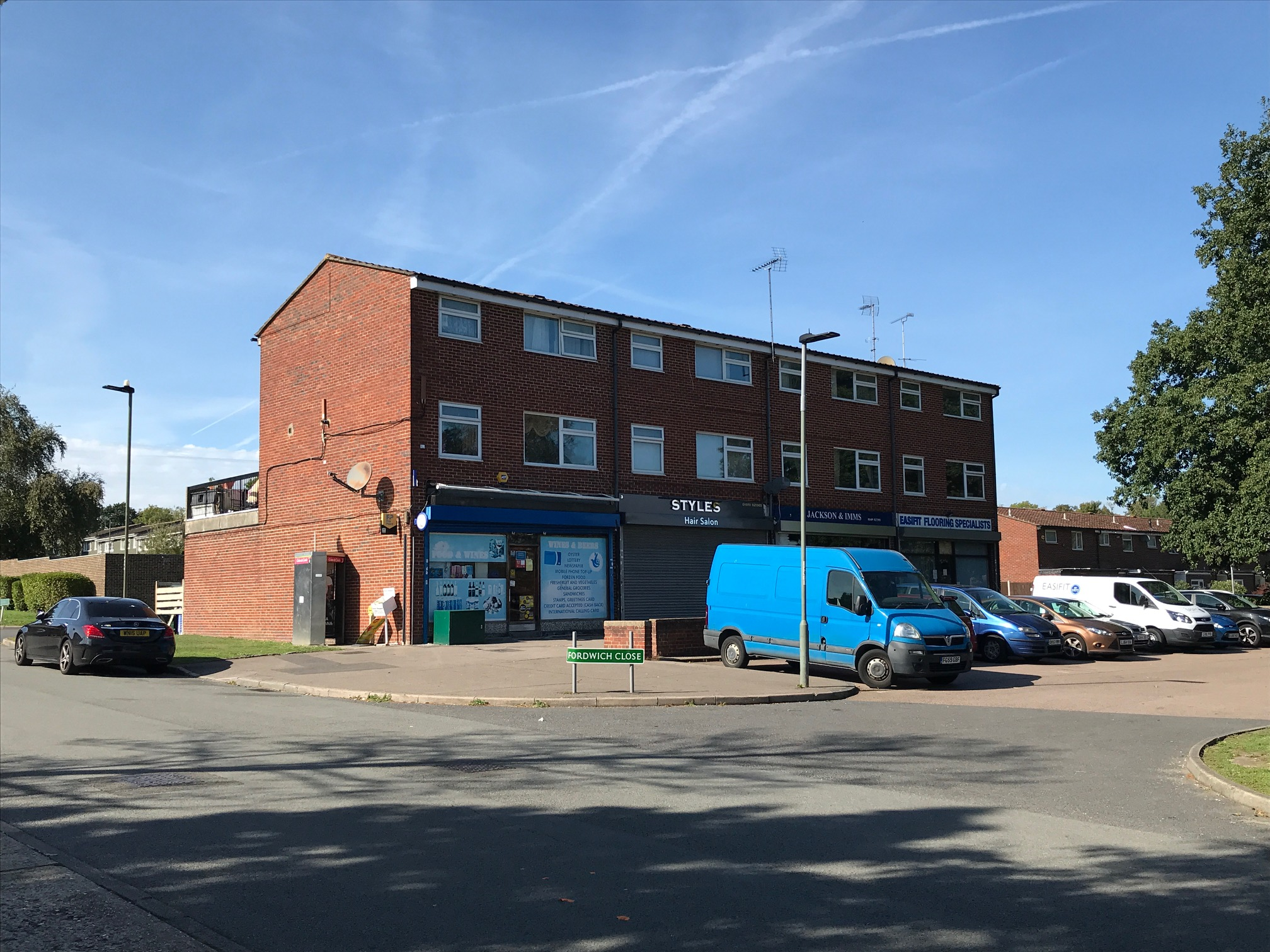
Shops on Fordwich Close

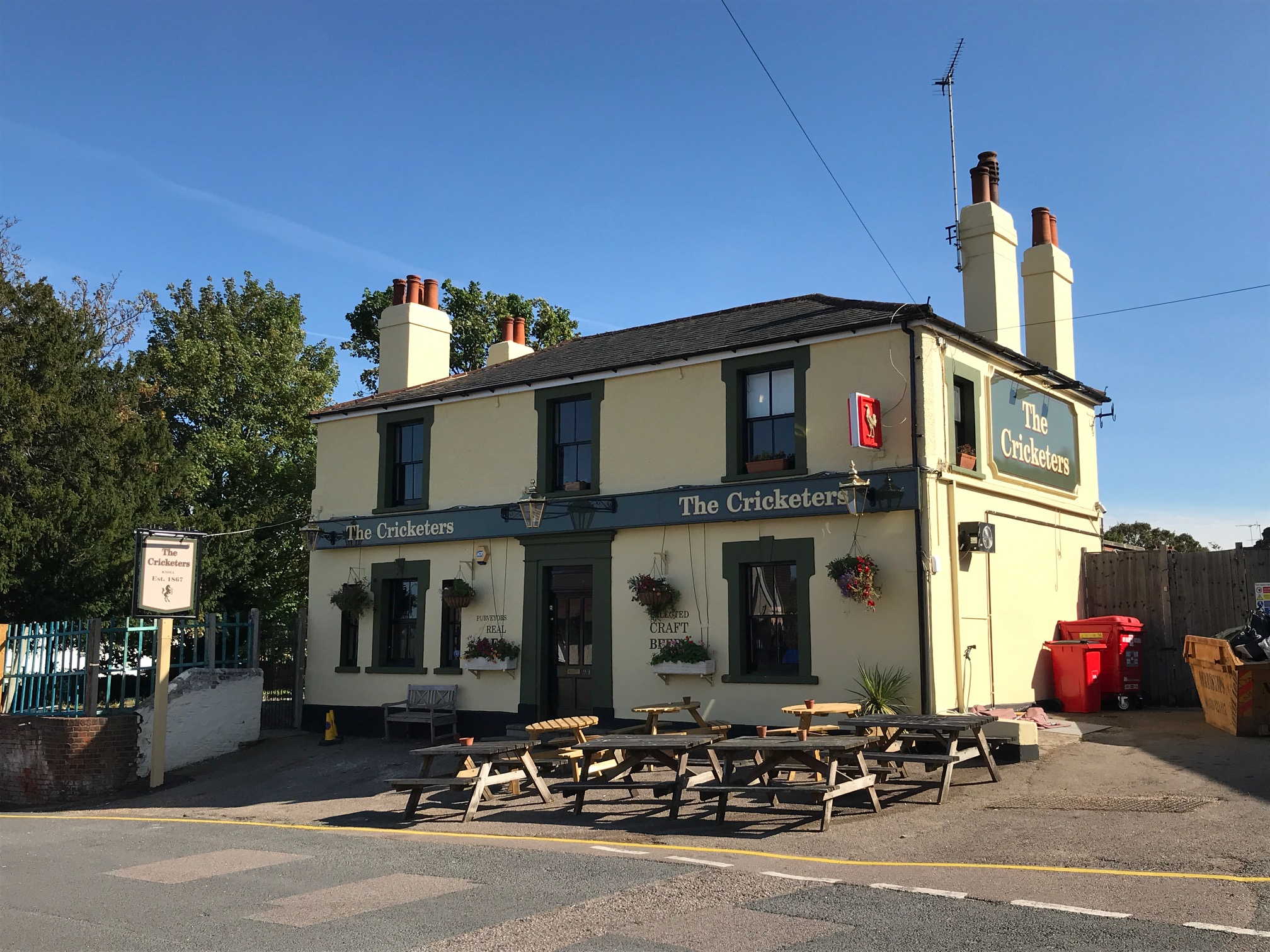
The Cricketers pub

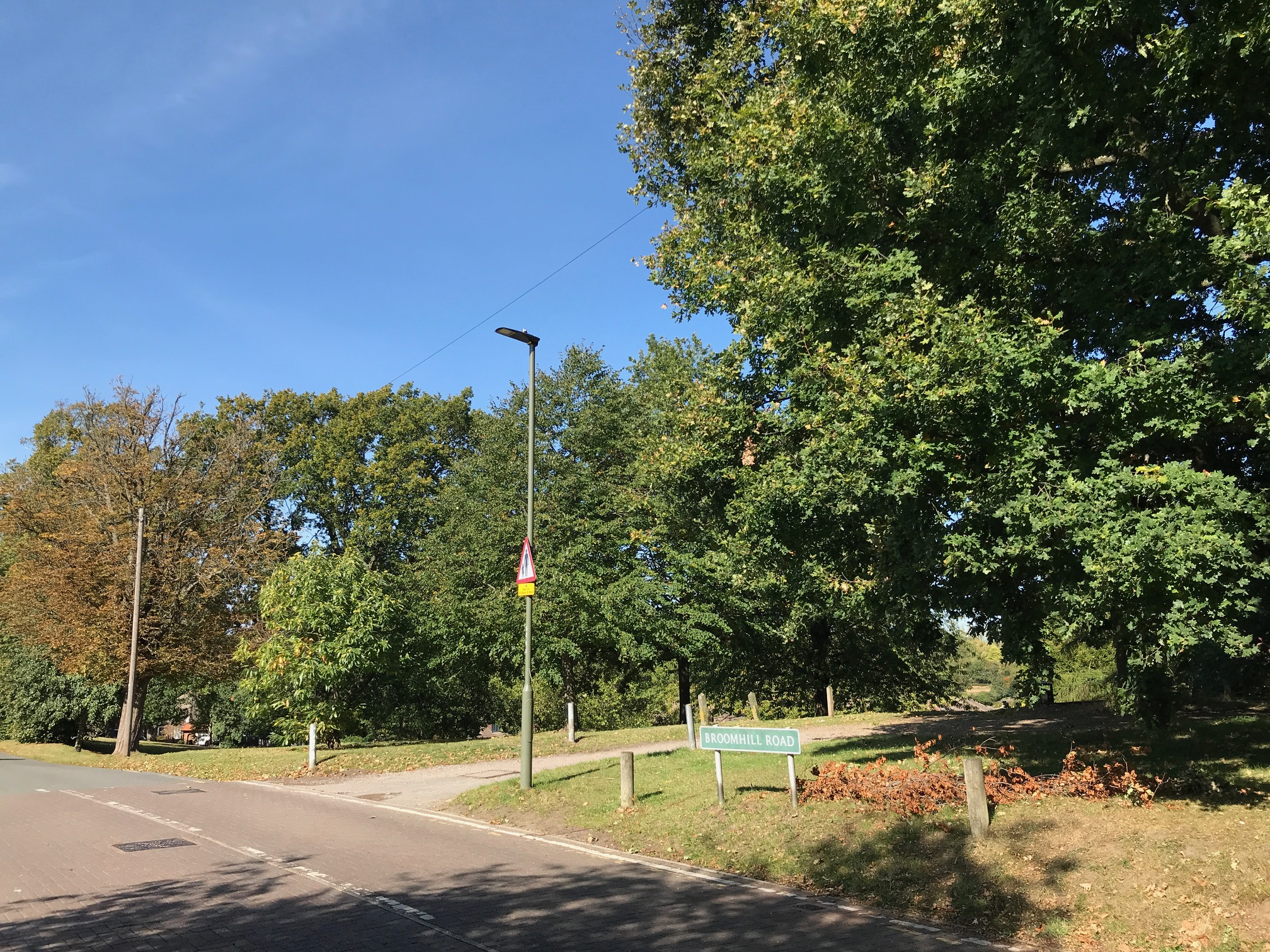
Broom Hill Common from Broomhill Road

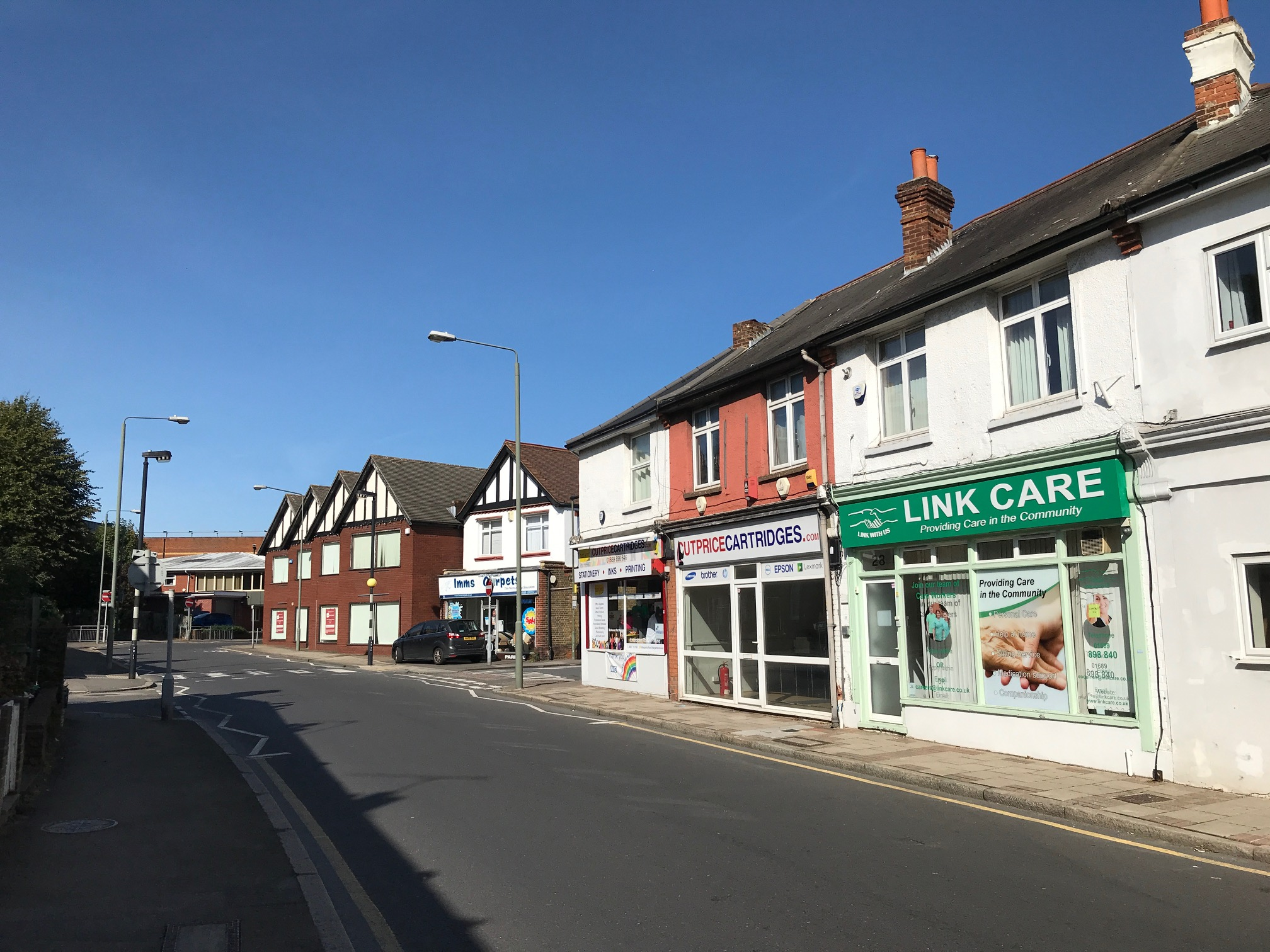
Shops on Chislehurst Road

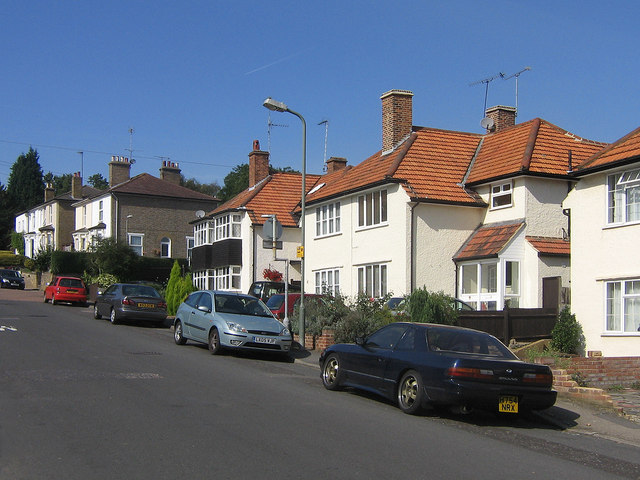
Typical suburban housing of the area
