= Milton Keynes City Council =

Local authority in England

- City of Milton Keynes
- Coat of Arms of Milton Keynes

- Council logo

Type
- Type: Unitary authority

History
- Founded: 1 April 1974

Leadership
- Mayor: Paul Trendall, Liberal Democrat since 20 May 2026
- Leader: Jane Carr, Liberal Democrat since 20 May 2026
- Chief Executive: Michael Bracey since 26 October 2018

Structure
- Seats: 60 councillors
- Political groups: Administration (38) Liberal Democrats (20) Labour (18) Other parties (21) Conservative (12) Reform (9) Vacancy (1) Vacant (1)

Elections
- Last election: 7 May 2026
- Next election: 6 May 2027

Meeting place
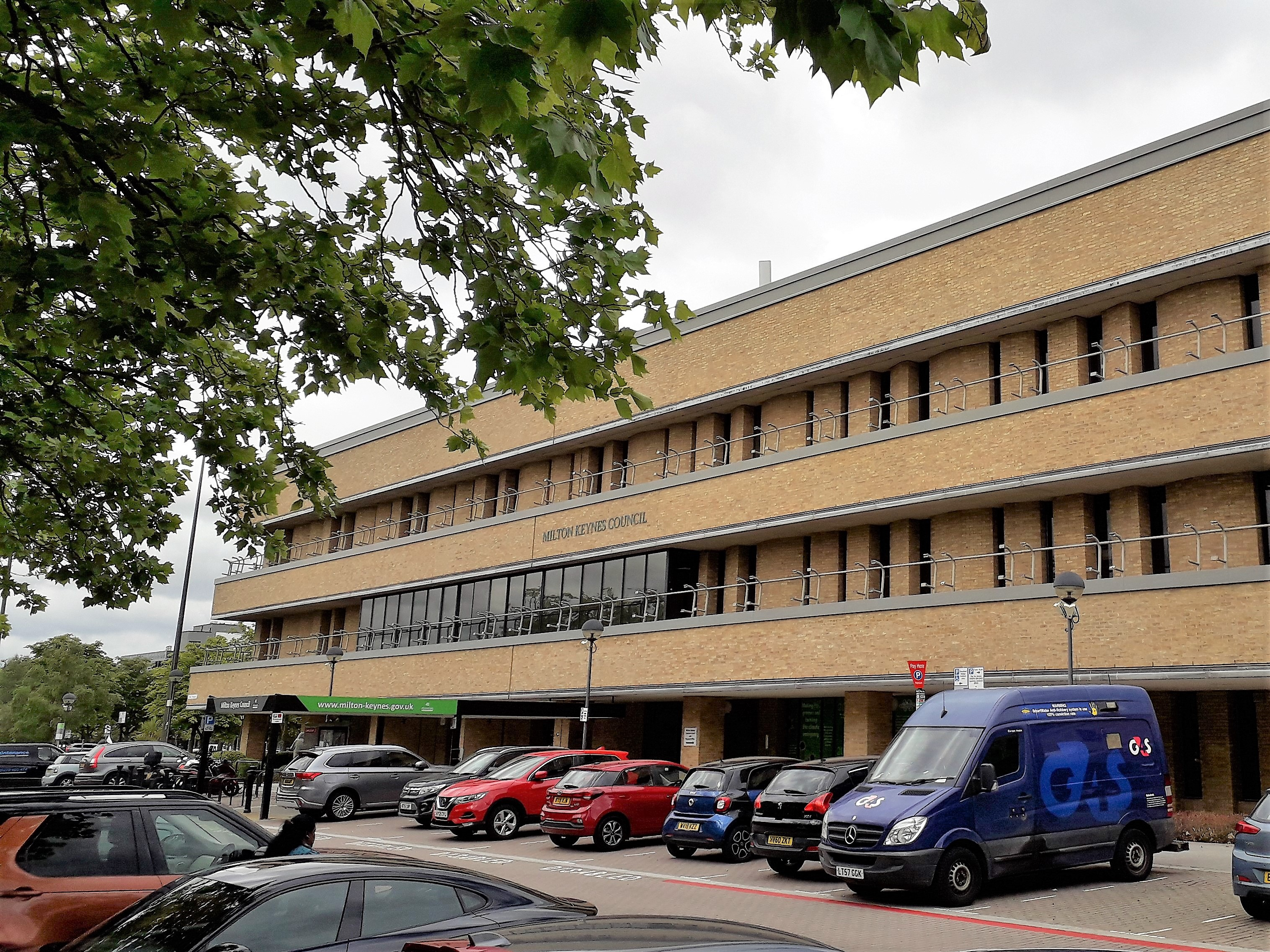
- Civic Offices, 1 Saxon Gate East, Milton Keynes, MK9 3EJ

Website
- milton-keynes.gov.uk

Milton Keynes City Council is the local authority for the City of Milton Keynes, a local government district in Buckinghamshire, England. The council was established in 1974 as Milton Keynes Borough Council. Since 1997 it has been a unitary authority, combining the functions of a district council and a county council; it is independent of Buckinghamshire Council, the unitary authority which administers the rest of the county.

The council has been under no overall control since the elections on 7 May 2026. On 22 May 2026, the Liberal Democrats and the Labour Party announced an alliance to run the authority. It is based at Milton Keynes Civic Offices.

== History ==
The non-metropolitan district of Milton Keynes and its council were created on 1 April 1974 under the Local Government Act 1972, by the merger of Bletchley Urban District, Newport Pagnell Urban District, Wolverton Urban District, Newport Pagnell Rural District and that part of Winslow Rural District within the designated area for the new town of Milton Keynes. From its creation, the district was also given borough status, entitling the council to be known as Milton Keynes Borough Council and allowing the chair of the council to take the title of mayor.

From 1974 until 1997, the council was a lower-tier district authority, with county-level services provided by Buckinghamshire County Council. On 1 April 1997, following a recommendation of the Local Government Commission for England, the council became a unitary authority. The way this change was implemented was to create a new non-metropolitan county of Milton Keynes covering the same area as the borough, but with no separate county council; instead the existing borough council took on county functions, making it a unitary authority. Milton Keynes remains part of the ceremonial county of Buckinghamshire for the purposes of lieutenancy.

From being made a unitary authority in 1997 until 2022 the council styled itself Milton Keynes Council. The borough was awarded city status on 15 August 2022. The council then changed its name to Milton Keynes City Council, and amended its logo to emphasise the new status.

== Powers and functions ==
The local council derives its powers and functions from the Local Government Act 1972 and subsequent legislation. For the purposes of local government, Milton Keynes is within a non-metropolitan area of England. In its capacity as a district council it is a billing authority collecting Council Tax and business rates, it processes local planning applications, it is responsible for housing, waste collection and environmental health. In its capacity as a county council it is a local education authority and is responsible for social services, libraries and waste disposal. The council also appoints members to Buckinghamshire Fire and Rescue Authority and the Thames Valley Police and Crime Panel, both of which serve the borough.

== Political control ==
The council has been under no overall control since the 2026 election. Following that election, a Liberal Democrat and Labour alliance formed to run the council, led by Liberal Democrat councillor Jane Carr.

The first election to the district council was held in 1973, initially operating as a shadow authority alongside the outgoing authorities until it came into its powers on 1 April 1974. Political control of the council since 1974 has been as follows:

Non-metropolitan district

Party in control	Years
Labour	1974–1976
Conservative	1976–1982
No overall control	1982–1990
Labour	1990–1992
No overall control	1992–1996
Labour	1996–1997

Unitary authority

Party in control	Years
Labour	1997–2000
No overall control	2000–2002
Liberal Democrats	2002–2006
No overall control	2006–2024
Labour	2024–2026
No overall control	2026–present

The council was under no overall control from 2006 to 2024. From May 2014 to May 2021, the Labour Party held office as a minority administration. From May 2021 to May 2024, the administration was a Labour Party and Liberal Democrat "progressive alliance".

=== Leadership ===
The role of mayor is largely ceremonial in Milton Keynes. Political leadership is instead provided by the leader of the council. The leaders since 1996 have been:

Councillor	Party	From	To
Bob Swepston	Labour	May 1974	May 1978
Kevin Wilson	Labour	May 1996	May 2000
Norman Miles	Labour	23 May 2000	May 2002
Isobel McCall (Note: Called Isobel Wilson until 2005)	Liberal Democrats	21 May 2002	May 2009
Sam Crooks	Liberal Democrats	19 May 2009	May 2010
Cec Tallack	Liberal Democrats	25 May 2010	May 2011
Andrew Geary	Conservative	24 May 2011	May 2014
Peter Marland	Labour	11 Jun 2014	May 2026
Jane Carr	Liberal Democrats	20 May 2026	

=== Composition ===
Following the 2026 election and a subsequent change in July 2026, the composition of the council was:

Party	Seats
Liberal Democrats	20
Labour	18
Conservative	12
Reform	9
Vacant	1
Total	60

The next election is due in 2027.

== Elections ==
Since the last boundary changes took effect in 2026, the council has comprised 60 councillors representing 21 wards. Most wards elect three councillors, with the exceptions being Hanslope ward which elects one councillor and New Bradwell ward which elects two councillors. Elections are held three years out of every four, with roughly a third of the council elected each time for a four-year term of office.

== Premises ==
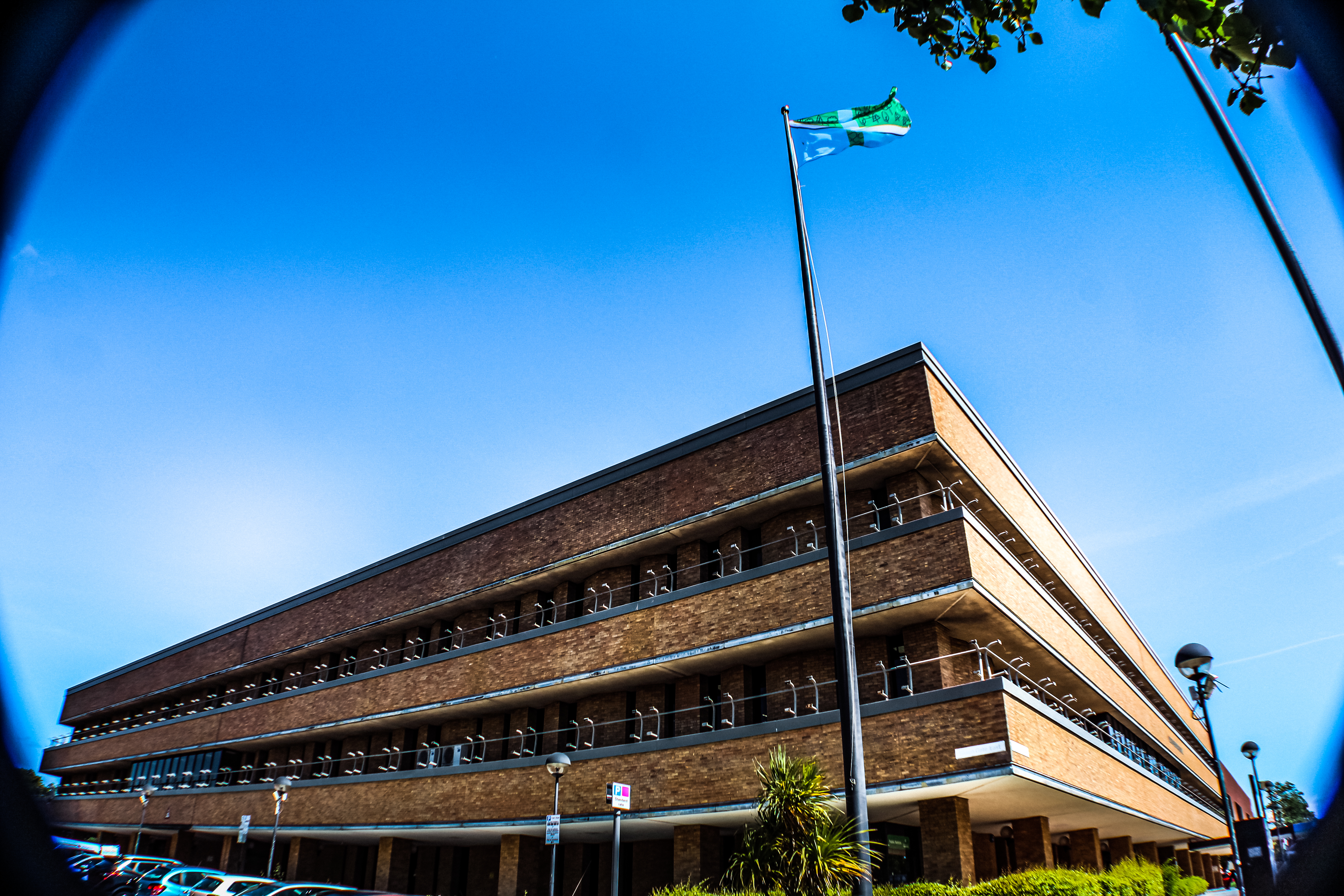
A wide angle view of the Civic offices building and flagpole in July 2020

The headquarters of the council, including the council chamber, is the Milton Keynes Civic Offices building at 1 Saxon Gate East in Central Milton Keynes. The building dates from 1979 and was designed by architects Faulkner Brown Hendy Watkinson Stonor. The building is sited very close to the moot mound (meeting place) of the Anglo-Saxon Sigelai (or Secklow) Hundred.

== Logos ==
Milton Keynes City Council has had two logos. The first logo was an oak leaf which was used from the 1990s.

The second logo is more colourful than the previous version, and consists of the two letters M and K, representing Milton Keynes. The 'M' is coloured in azure and 'K' is coloured in green: this is the logo that is currently in use, with a recent revision to change the font and text accompanying it to mark Milton Keynes' city status.

Coat of arms of Milton Keynes City Council

Notes
Granted 3 December 1975 by the College of Arms.
Crest
Perched upon the battlements of a tower Proper issuant therefro on either side a branch of oak fructed of five acorns and as many leaves an eagle displayed wings inverted Or gorged with a collar dancetty of four points upward per fess dancetty Gules and Sable.
Torse
Argent and Gules.
Escutcheon
Vair three bars Gules issuant from the base an oak tree of five branches fructed and the trunk enfiling a mural crown Or.
Supporters
On either side a fallow buck Proper charged on the shoulder with a representation of a Cretan double axe erect Or.
Motto
By Knowledge Design And Understanding

== Technology facilitation ==
In recent years, the council has promoted the city as a test-bed for experimental urban technologies. The most well-known of these is the Starship Technologies' (largely) autonomous delivery robots: Milton Keynes provided its world-first urban deployment of these units. By November 2020, said Starship, Milton Keynes had the 'world's largest autonomous robot fleet'. Other projects include the LUTZ Pathfinder pod, an autonomous (self-driving) vehicle built by the Transport Systems Catapult. Trials took place in Milton Keynes in 2016.

== Controversies ==
=== Blakelands Warehouse ===
In May 2017, the City Council approved plans to build an 18m (59ft)-high warehouse in Blakelands, with the warehouse (which was constructed in 2018) being criticised by local residents as "oppressive", and there were concerns about planning malpractice, including the lack of a noise barrier and the retention of trees and hedges. In February 2019, the Council commissioned external planning expert Marc Dorfman to review the decision, although the report was not complete due to Dorfman's resignation later that year. Following this, the Council appointed independent barrister Tim Straker to carry out an independent report, with the report (published in 2021) finding that while planning conditions were missed as a result of "human error", there was "no untoward conduct."
