= Elizabeth Foulis =

Scottish benefactor

- Born: October 24, 1746; London
- Died: 1827 (aged 80–81)
- Occupation: Library benefactor
- Parent: Sir James Foulis, 5th Baronet

Elizabeth Foulis (24 October 1746 – 1827) was a Scottish library benefactor who bequeathed her collection of rare books to the University of St Andrews Library.

== Early life ==
Miss Elizabeth Foulis was born on 24 October 1746, in London, the daughter of Sir James Foulis, 5th Baronet, and his wife Mary. She had two surviving siblings; an older brother, James, the heir presumptive to the baronetcy, and a younger sister, Mary. Her father was an acquaintance of Samuel Johnson, John Boswell and Sir Walter Scott.

== Reading habits ==
In 1808, she donated two shells brought by her father from India to the University of St Andrews, as a result of which she received borrowing rights to the University Library, and evidence of her reading life in St Andrews began. Between 1815 and 1826, she borrowed 412 books, an average of forty-five books a year. In 1820, she borrowed ninety-eight books, often returning multiple times in a week to fetch more volumes. Most student borrowers filled up a single page in the receipt book with their borrowing records, but Elizabeth filled up eight.

== Library benefactor ==
Elizabeth Foulis died in 1827, at the age of eighty-one, and bequeathed her collection of 46 rare books to the St Andrews University Library, many of which are still held in the University Collections.
