= Samosa =

Deep-fried snack/turnover

Samosa(s)
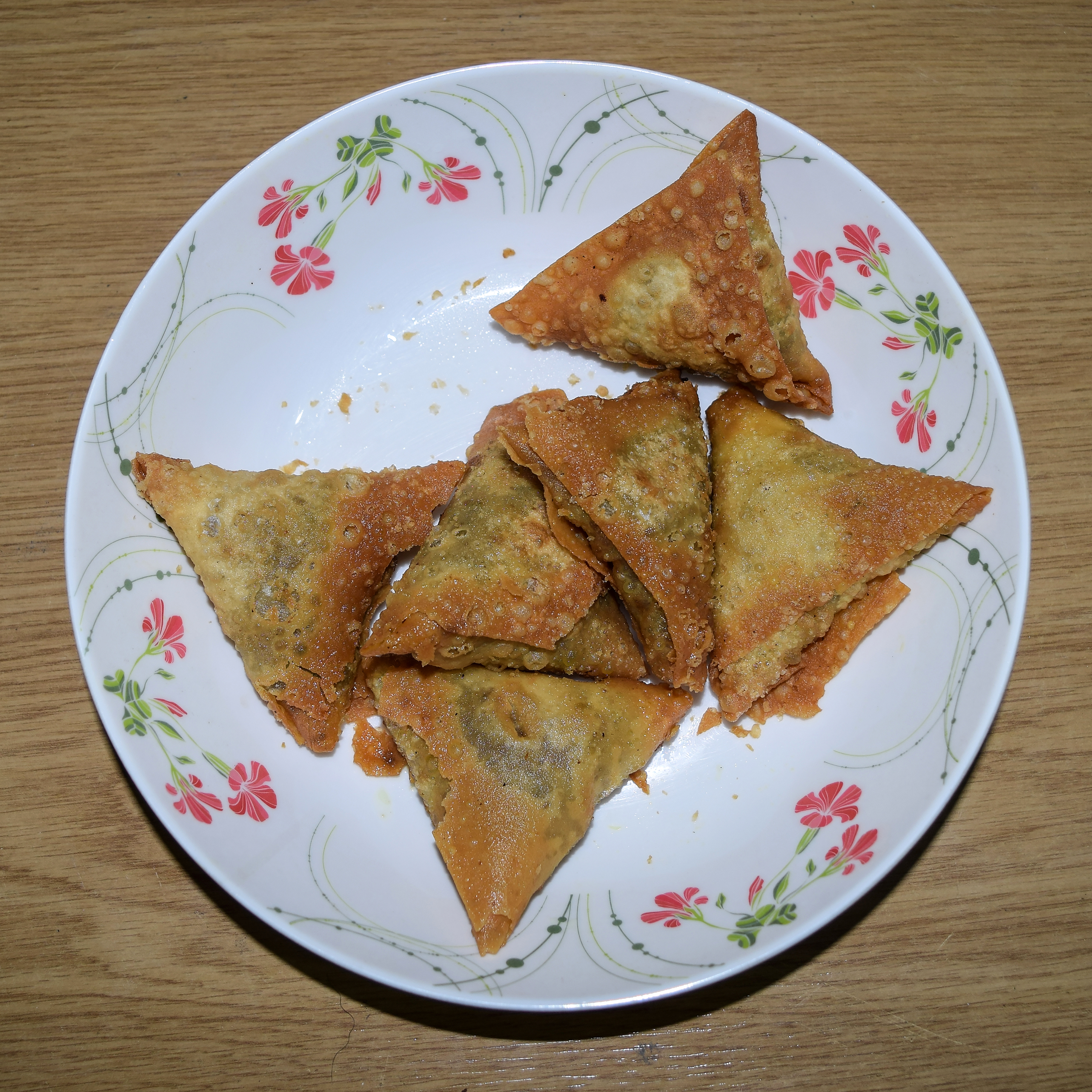
- Alternative names: Sambusa, samusa, siṅgaṛā/siṅāṛā, samose
- Type: Savoury turnover
- Course: Entrée, side dish, snack
- Place of origin: Central Asia and the Middle East
- Region or state: South Asia and worldwide
- Serving temperature: Hot
- Main ingredients: Flour, vegetables (e.g. potatoes, onions, peas, lentils), spices, chilli peppers, mince, and cheese

A samosa (/səˈmoʊsə/) or shingara is a fried Indian subcontinent turnover with a savoury filling that mostly consists of vegetables like spiced potatoes, onions, and peas, but can include cheese such as paneer, meat or even fish. Its name originates from the Middle Persian word sambosag (سنبوسگ) (meaning 'triangular pastry'). It is made in different shapes, including a triangle, a cone, or a crescent, depending on the region. Samosas are often accompanied by chutney and have origins in the Middle Ages or earlier. Sweet versions containing traditional Indian flavours, or even chocolate, are also made. Samosas are popular snacks in South Asia and within the Indian diaspora across the world.

== Etymology ==
The English word samosa derives from the Hindustani word samosa (Hindi: समोसा), traceable to the Middle Persian word sambōsag (سنبوسگ) 'triangular pastry'. Similar turnovers are called sambusak in Arabic from Persian; Medieval Arabic recipe books sometimes spell it sambusaj. All these word-forms are borrowed from the Persian.

The names shingara, singara, or singada, used in the East of the Indian subcontinent including Bengal and Eastern Nepal, denotes the water caltrop, a plant whose fruit is sharply tetrahedral like the pastries made there.

Names of samosas in different countries. Many of the names derive from Persian.

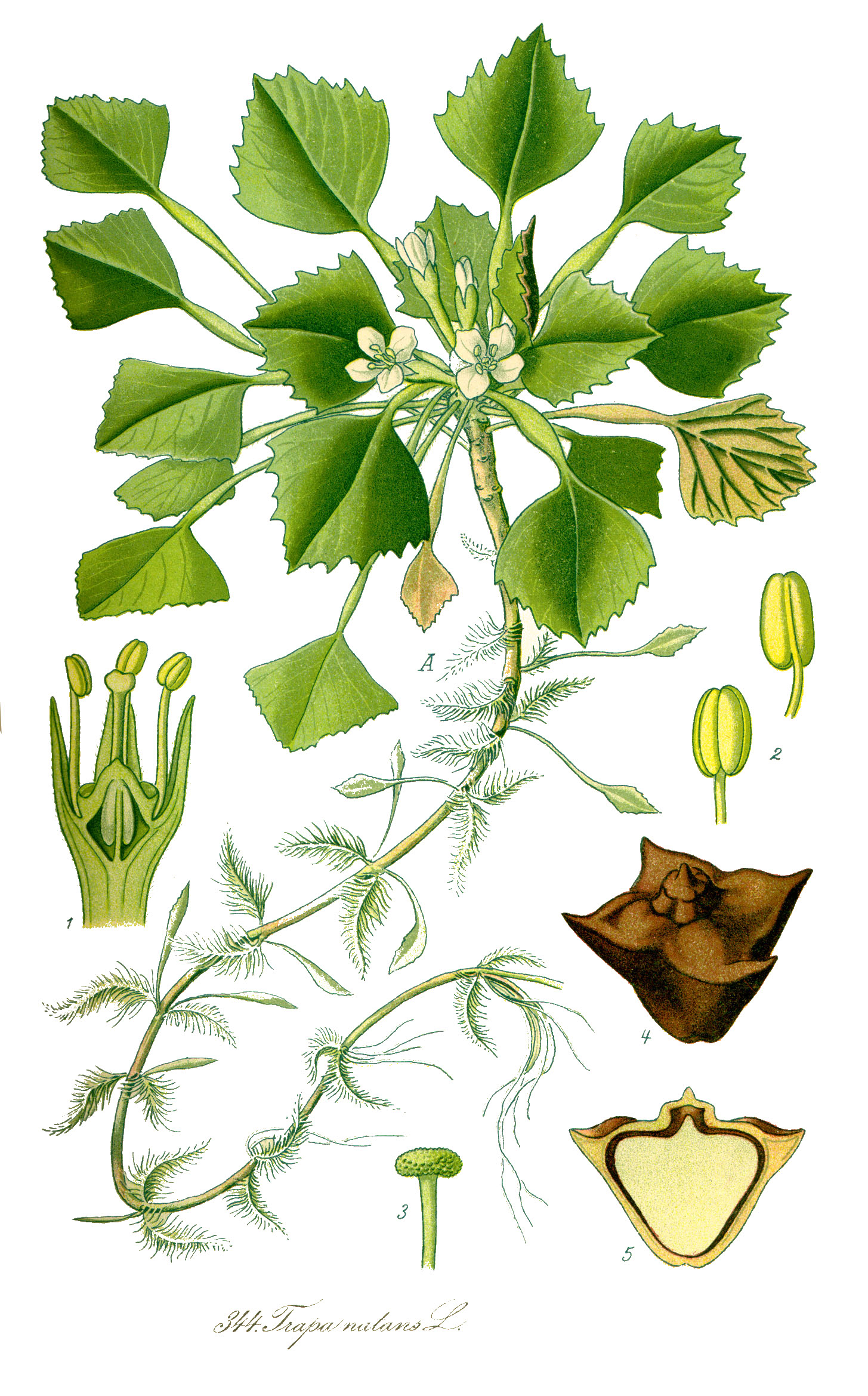
Shingara denotes the water caltrop and its tetrahedral fruit, like one form of the pastry.

== History ==
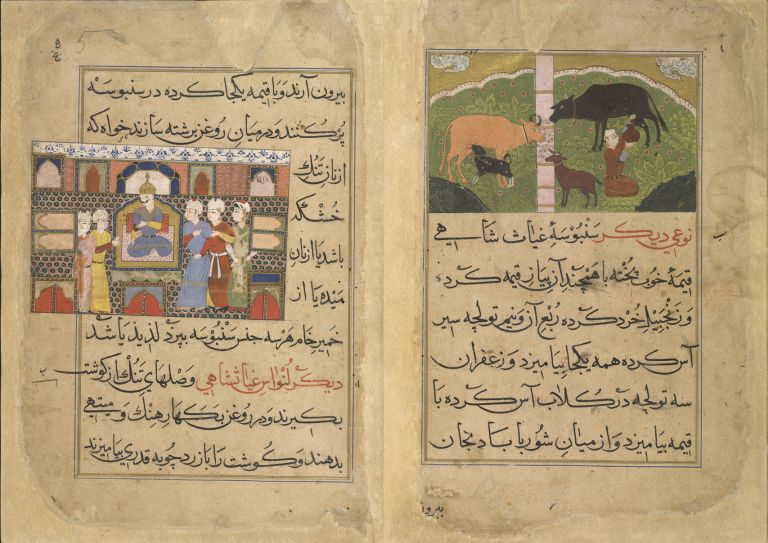
The Persian manuscript Ni'matnāmah Naṣir al-Dīn Shāhī explaining how samosas should be cooked

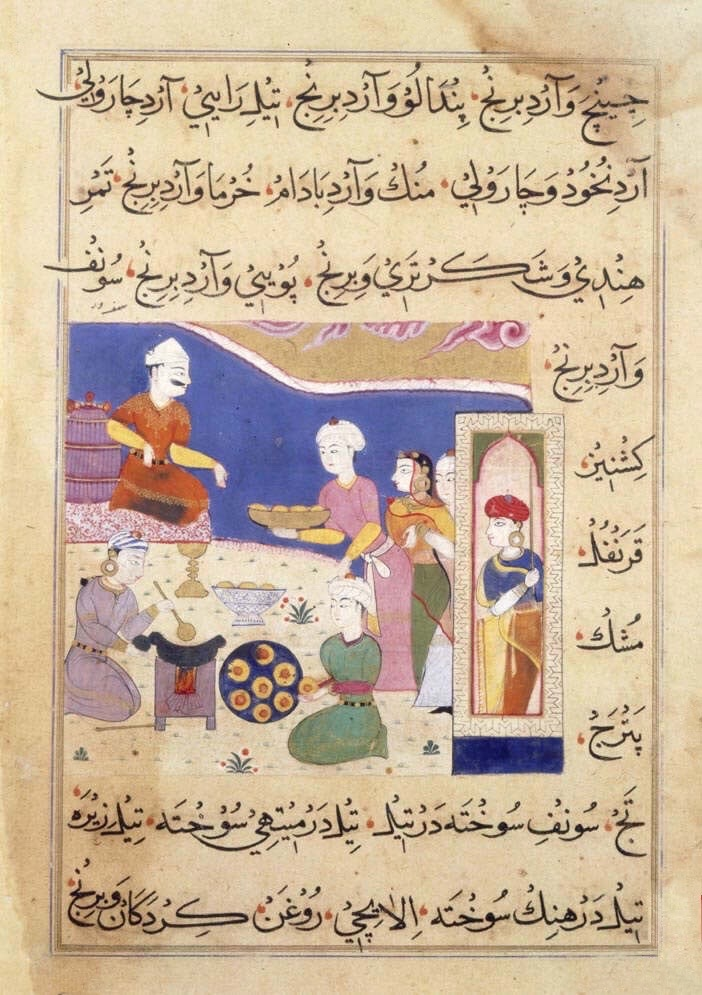
Medieval Indian cookbook with Persian manuscript Ni'matnāmah Naṣir al-Dīn Shāhī (c. 16th century) showing samosas being served

The South Asian samosa is believed to be derived from a medieval precursor from the Middle East that was baked and not deep-fried. The earliest mention of a samosa precursor was by Abbasid-era poet Ishaq al-Mawsili, praising the sanbusaj. Recipes are found in 10th–13th-century Arab cookery books, under the names sanbusak, sanbusaq, and sanbusaj, all from the Persian word sanbosag. Among these is sanbusaj in the Arabic 10th century Kitab al-Tabikh in the same chapter as sausages, suggesting the dough may have been a substitute for intestine. In Iran, the dish was popular until the 16th century, but by the 20th century, its popularity was restricted to certain provinces (such as the sambusas of Larestan). Abu'l-Fadl Bayhaqi (995–1077), an Iranian historian, mentioned it in his history book, Tarikh-i Bayhaqi.

The Central Asian samsa was introduced to the Indian subcontinent in the 13th or 14th century by chefs from the Middle East and Central Asia who cooked in the royal kitchens for the rulers of the Delhi Sultanate. Amir Khusrau (1253–1325), a scholar and the royal poet of the Delhi Sultanate, wrote around 1300 CE that the princes and nobles enjoyed the "samosa prepared from meat, ghee, onion, and so on". Ibn Battuta, a 14th-century traveller and explorer, describes a meal at the court of Muhammad bin Tughluq, where the samushak or sambusak, a small pie stuffed with minced meat, almonds, pistachios, walnuts, and spices, was served before the third course of pulao. Ni'matnāmah Naṣir al-Dīn Shāhī, a medieval Indian cookbook started for Ghiyath Shah, the ruler of the Malwa Sultanate in central India, mentions the art of making samosa. The Ain-i-Akbari, a 16th-century Mughal document, mentions the recipe for qottab, which it says, "the people of Hindustan call sanbúsah".

The samosa gained popularity because of its savoury flavour and convenience. The pocket-sized food item was a readily available snack for workers and travellers across India, Pakistan, and Central Asia.

== Regional varieties ==
=== Indian subcontinent ===
In the Indian subcontinent, samosas are prepared with an all-purpose flour (locally known as maida) and stuffed with a filling, often a mixture of diced and cooked or mashed boiled potatoes, onions, green peas, lentils, ginger, spices and green chillies. A samosa can be either vegetarian or non-vegetarian, depending on the filling. The entire pastry is deep-fried in vegetable oil to a golden-brown colour. It is served hot, often as a chaat street food, with fresh chutneys. In the Indian states of Assam, Odisha, West Bengal, Bihar and Jharkhand, singara (সিঙ্গারা) or shingra (চিংৰা) (the East Indian version of samosas) is a popular snack. They are somewhat smaller than in other parts of India, with a filling of cooked diced potato, peanuts, and sometimes raisins. In Hyderabad, a smaller version with a thicker pastry crust and minced meat filling, called lukhmi, is eaten.

Both flat (triangular) and full-shaped (tetrahedron/triangular pyramid) samosas are popular in Bangladesh. A Bengali version of the full-shaped samosa is called a shingara (সিঙাড়া) and is normally smaller than the standard variety. The shingara is usually filled with pieces of potatoes, vegetables, and nuts. Samosas are called singadas in the eastern part of Nepal; the rest of the country calls it samosa.

A distinct variety, available in Karachi, is called kaghazi samosa (Urdu: کاغذی سموسہ; "paper samosa") due to its thin and crispy covering, which resembles a wonton or spring roll wrapper. Fillings include beef, chicken, and lamb, or they can be made as a sweet.

The samosas made in Maldivian cuisine are known as bajiyaa. They are filled with a mixture including fish like tuna and onions.

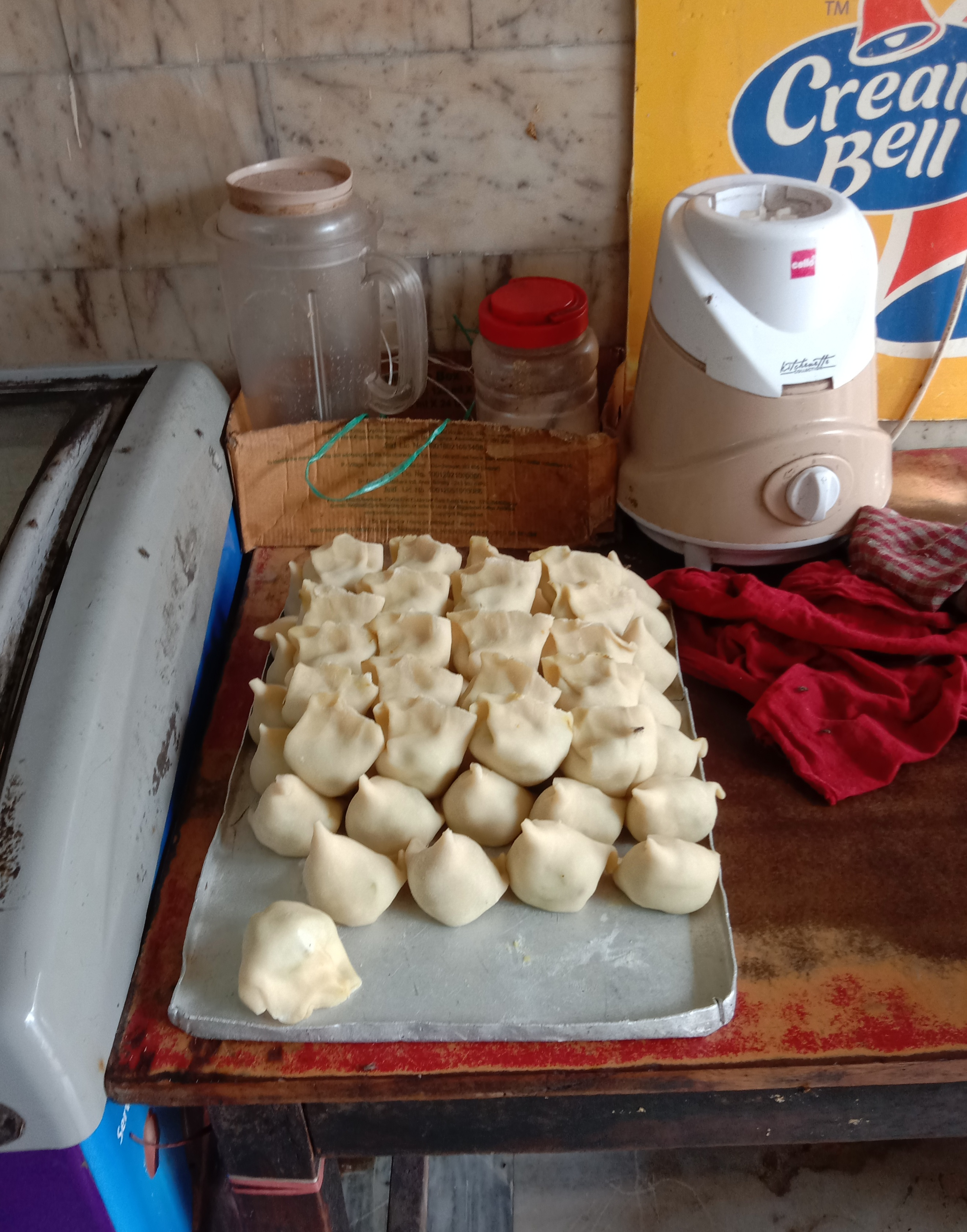
Samosas before being fried, at a sweet shop in Kolkata

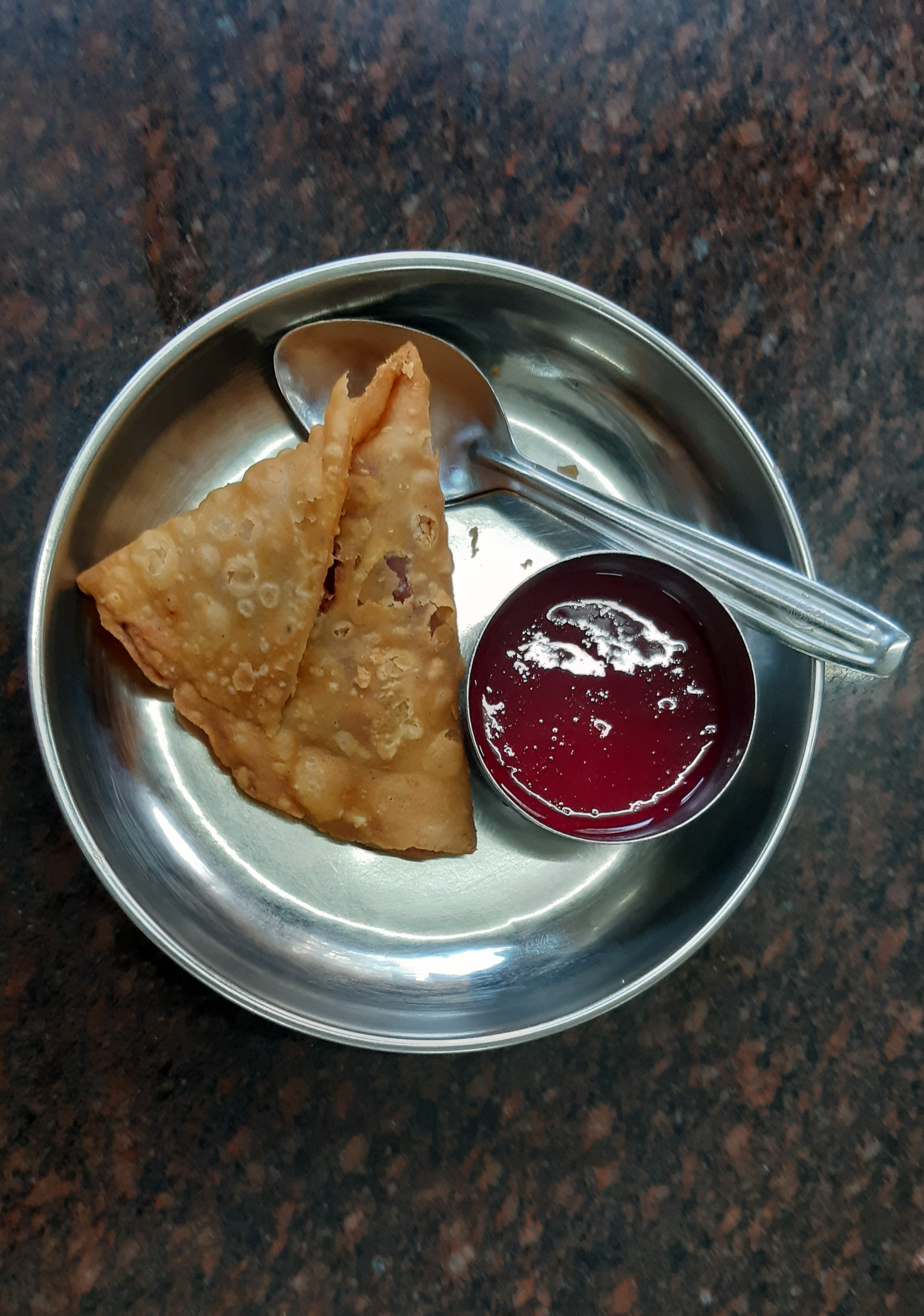
Samosa with tomato ketchup at coffee houses in Kerala

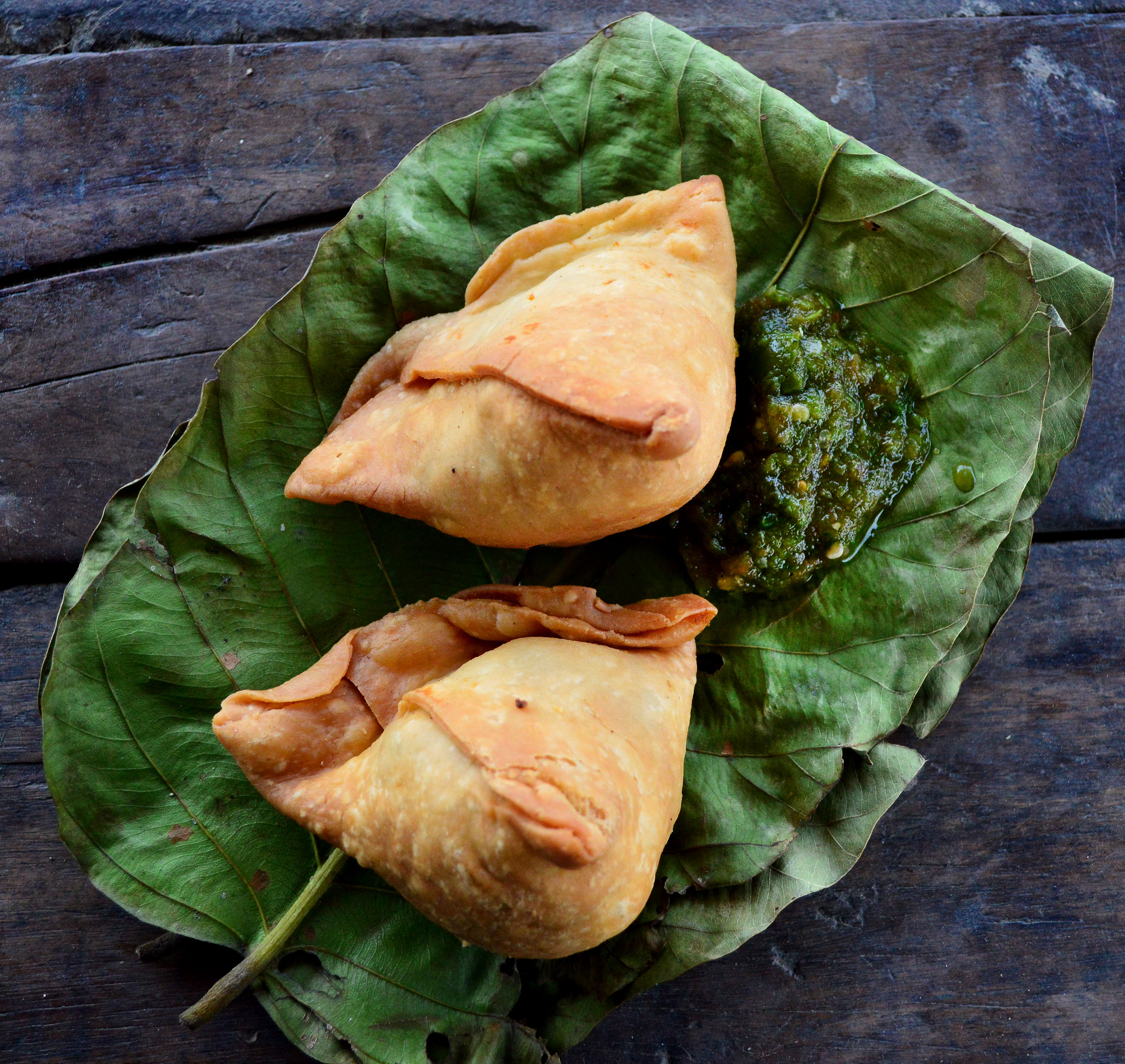
Tetrahedral shingaras, with green chutney

=== Central Asia ===
The samsa is a savoury turnover in Central Asian cuisines such as that of Uzbekistan. It consists of a pastry stuffed with meat and sometimes vegetables and baked in a tandoor oven, rather than being fried.

In Tajik cuisine, sambusa-i varaki are triangular turnovers, filled with minced beef or mutton mixed with tail fat, flavoured with onions and spices, and baked in a tandoor oven.

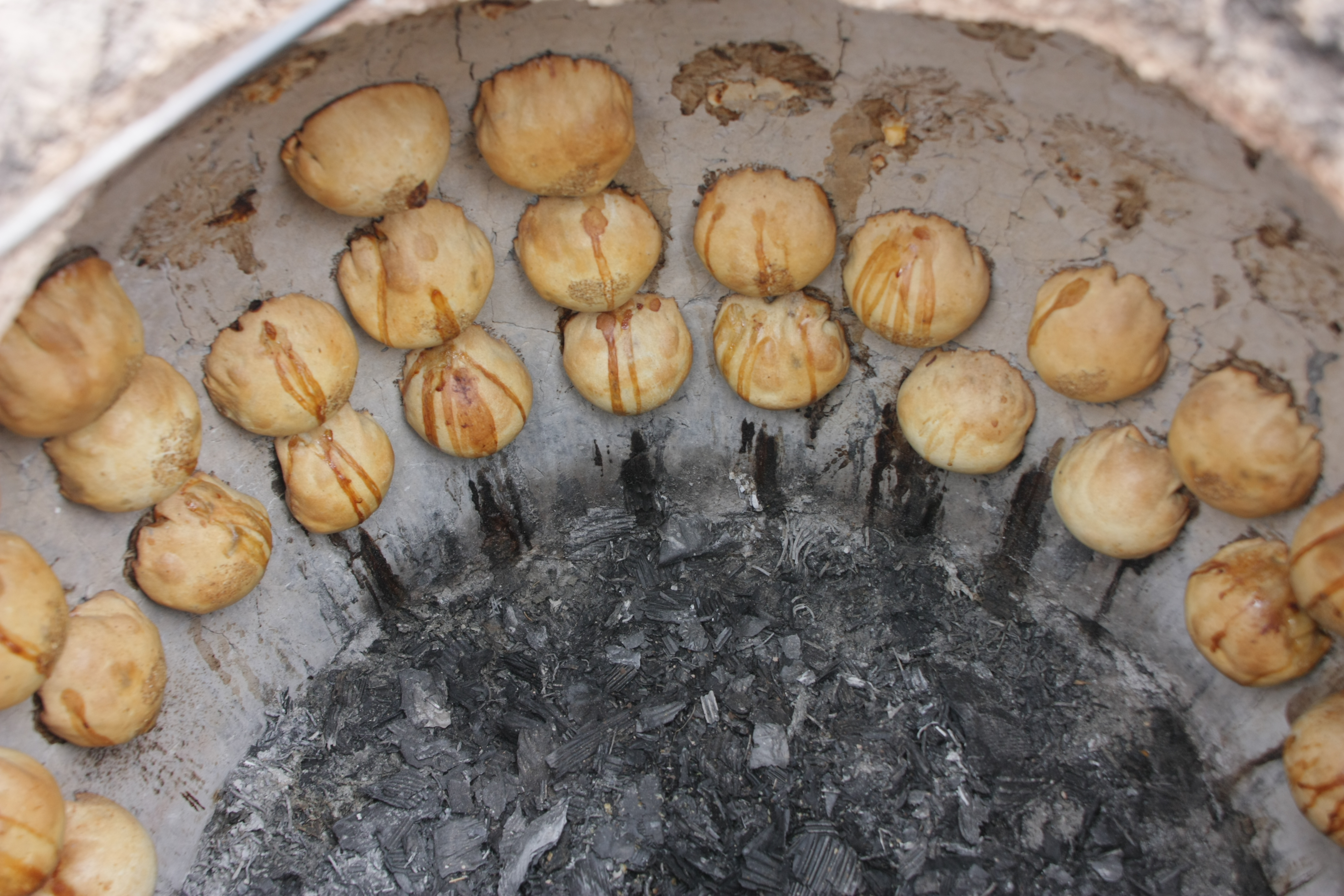
A batch of samsas being baked in a tandoor oven in Khiva, Uzbekistan

=== Southeast Asia ===
Samosas are called samuza (စမူဆာ) in Burmese, and are an extremely popular street snack in Burma. Samosas are also used in a traditional Burmese salad called samuza thoke (စမူဆာသုပ်‌; lit. 'samosa salad'), a salad of cut samosa pieces with onions, cabbage, fresh mint, light potato and chickpea curry broth, masala, chilli powder, salt and lime.

In Indonesia, snacks similar to samosas include pastel, panada and epok-epok.

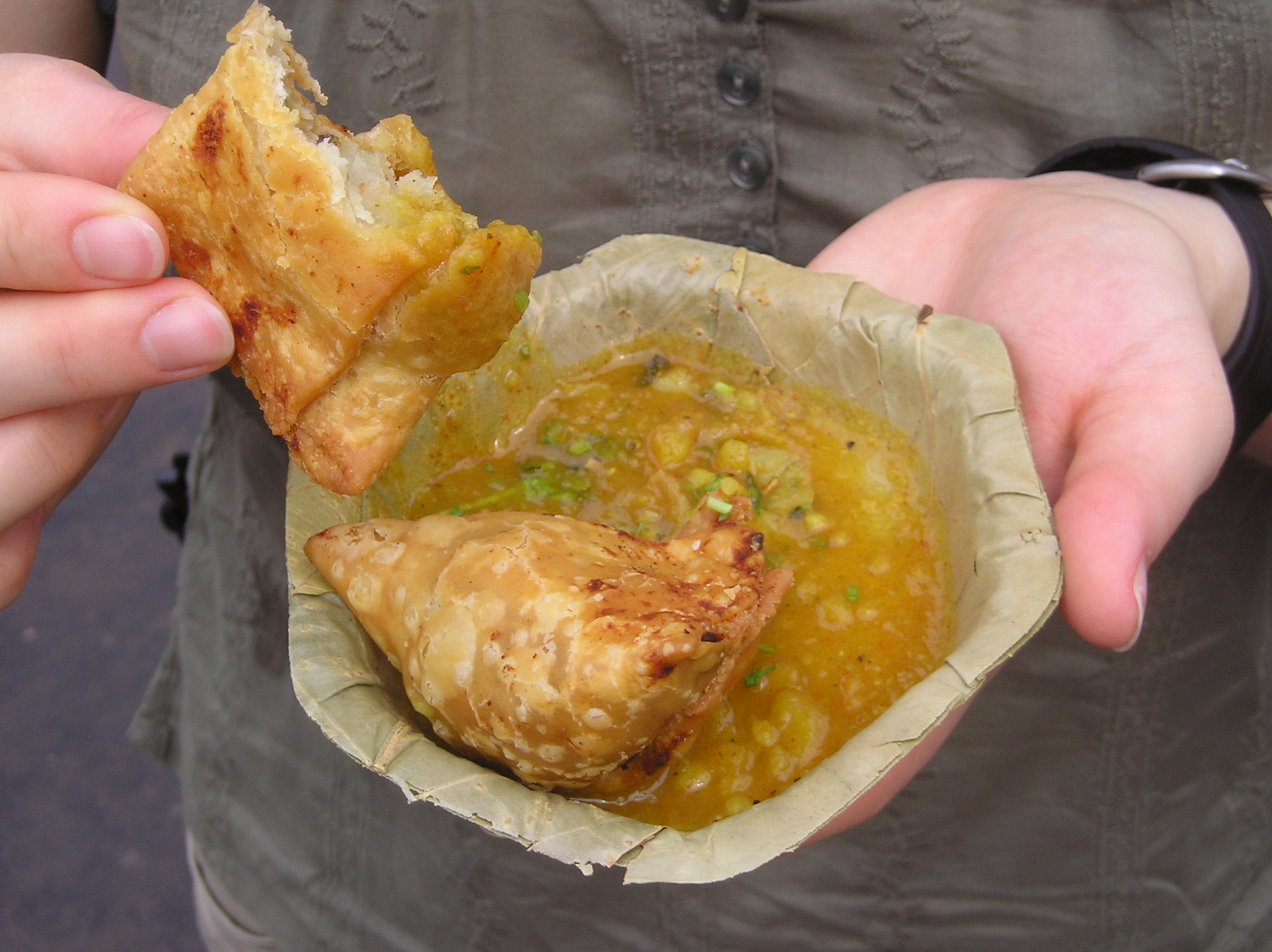
Burmese-style samuza, smaller than their Indian counterparts

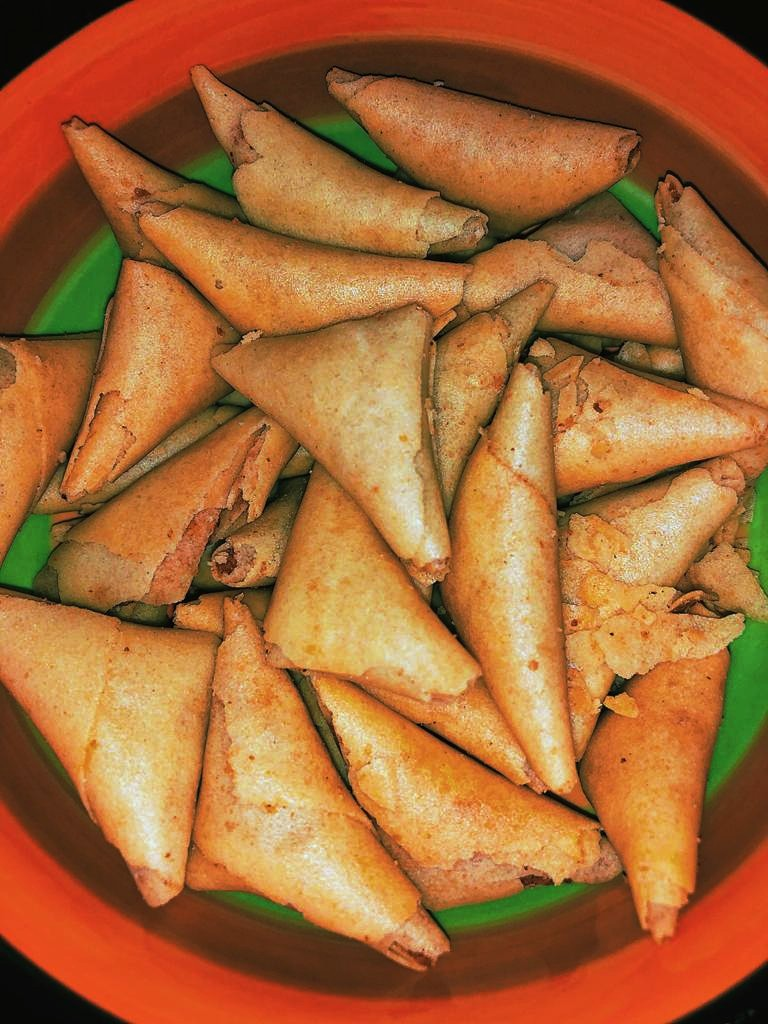
Indonesian-style samosa

=== Africa ===
All across East Africa, samosas, known by several variants of the name, are popular. In Somalia, sambuus filled with vegetables, meat, or seafood are eaten on special occasions. Samosas, locally called samoussas, are a popular snack on Réunion. They are filled with chicken, cheese, crabs or potatoes.

South African samoosas tend to be smaller than Indian ones. Samosa dough is also used for a flatbread called farmaas puri, which consists of rolled-up sheets of dough stacked with minced meat, which are cut into thin circles and deep fried. Originating in South Africa, farmaas puri spread to Gujarati communities in India and Pakistan, where it is popular during Ramadan.

In West African countries such as Ghana and Nigeria, samosas are a common street food. In Nigeria, they are usually served in parties along with chicken or beef, puff puff, spring rolls and plantains and are among the finger foods called "small chops".

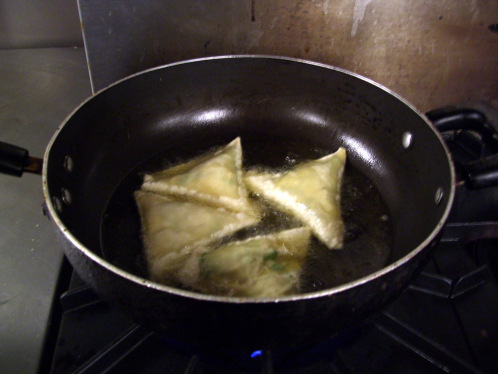
Somali sambuus being fried

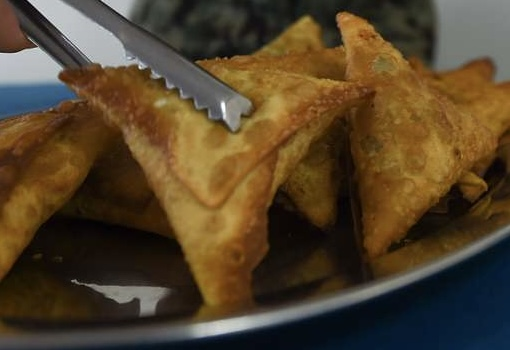
Somali sambuus being served

=== Middle East ===
Sambousek (Arabic: سمبوسك) are usually filled with either meat, onion, pine nuts, za’atar, spinach dock, or cheese. Sambousek is most popular during Ramadan.

Sambuseh (Persian: سمبوسه) originated in Iran but is now rare there. The sweet fried turnover qottab is derived from it. Modern Iranian Sambuseh is made either with a sausage and pizza cheese based filling, or with vegetables.

Sambusak (Hebrew: סמבוסק) comes in several distinct forms, as sambusak has been influenced differently by Sephardic and Mizrahi Jewish cuisine. Sephardi sambusak is generally thicker, baked, and stuffed with either cheese or beef and coated with sesame or nigella seeds. Mizrahi sambusak is generally thinner, larger, fried, and stuffed with curry-spiced chickpea and onion, and is usually not coated with seeds.

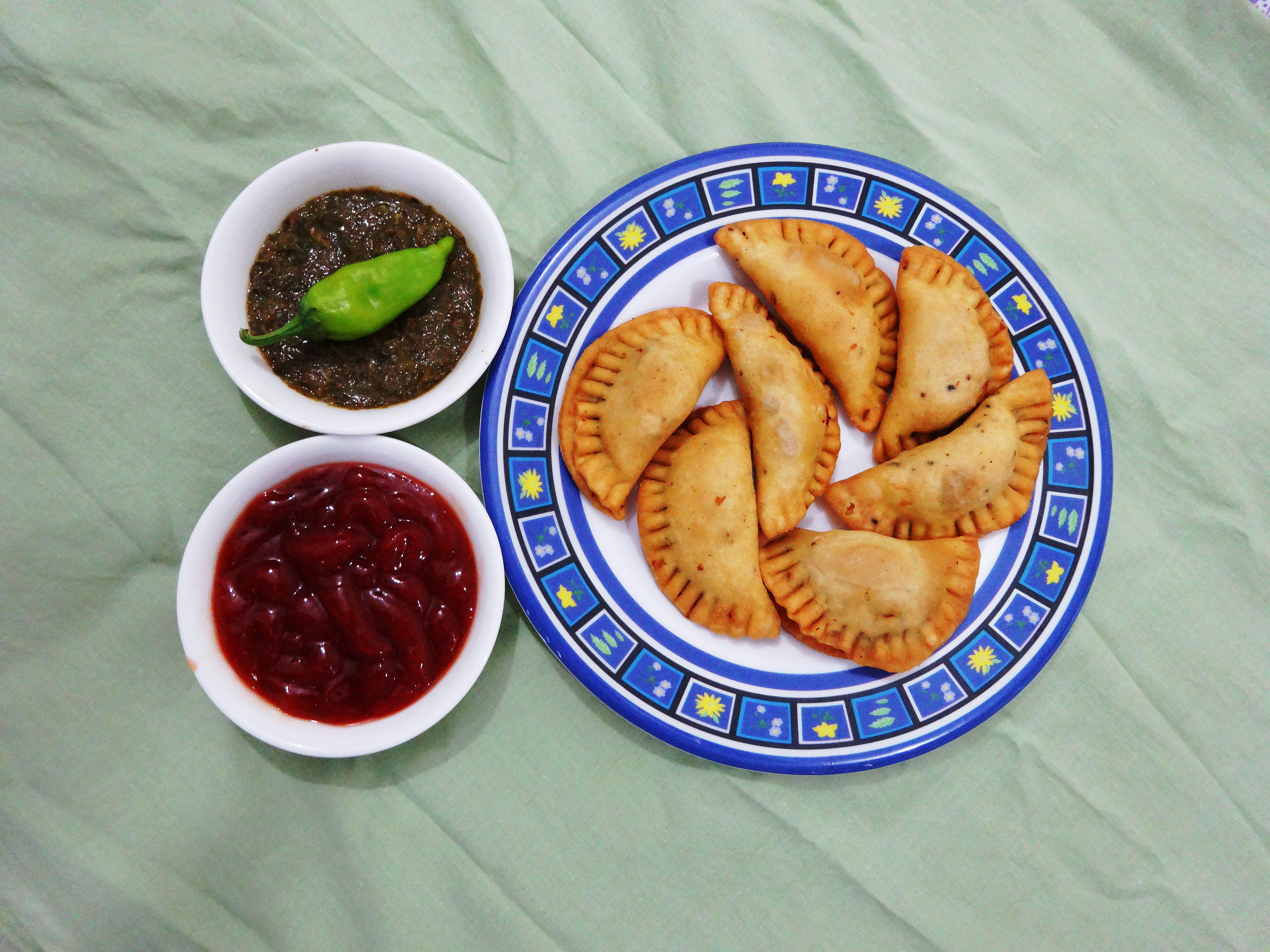
Sambousek

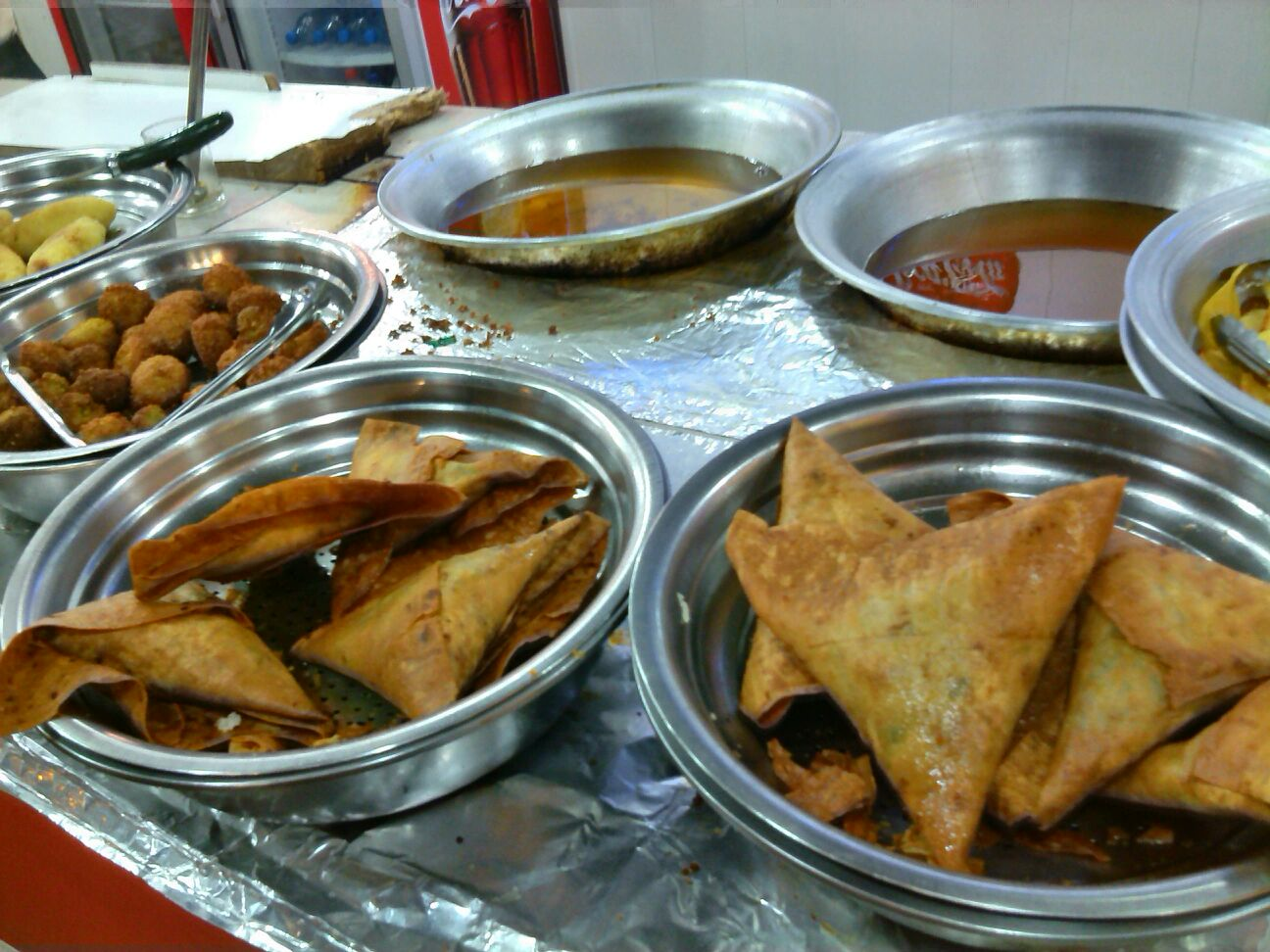
Sambuseh at a bazar in Ahvaz, Iran

=== Portuguese-speaking regions ===
In Goa, Portugal, and Angola, samosas are known as chamuças. They are filled with chicken, beef, pork, lamb or vegetables, and generally served quite hot. Samosas are an integral part of Goan Catholic and Portuguese cuisine, where they are a common snack.

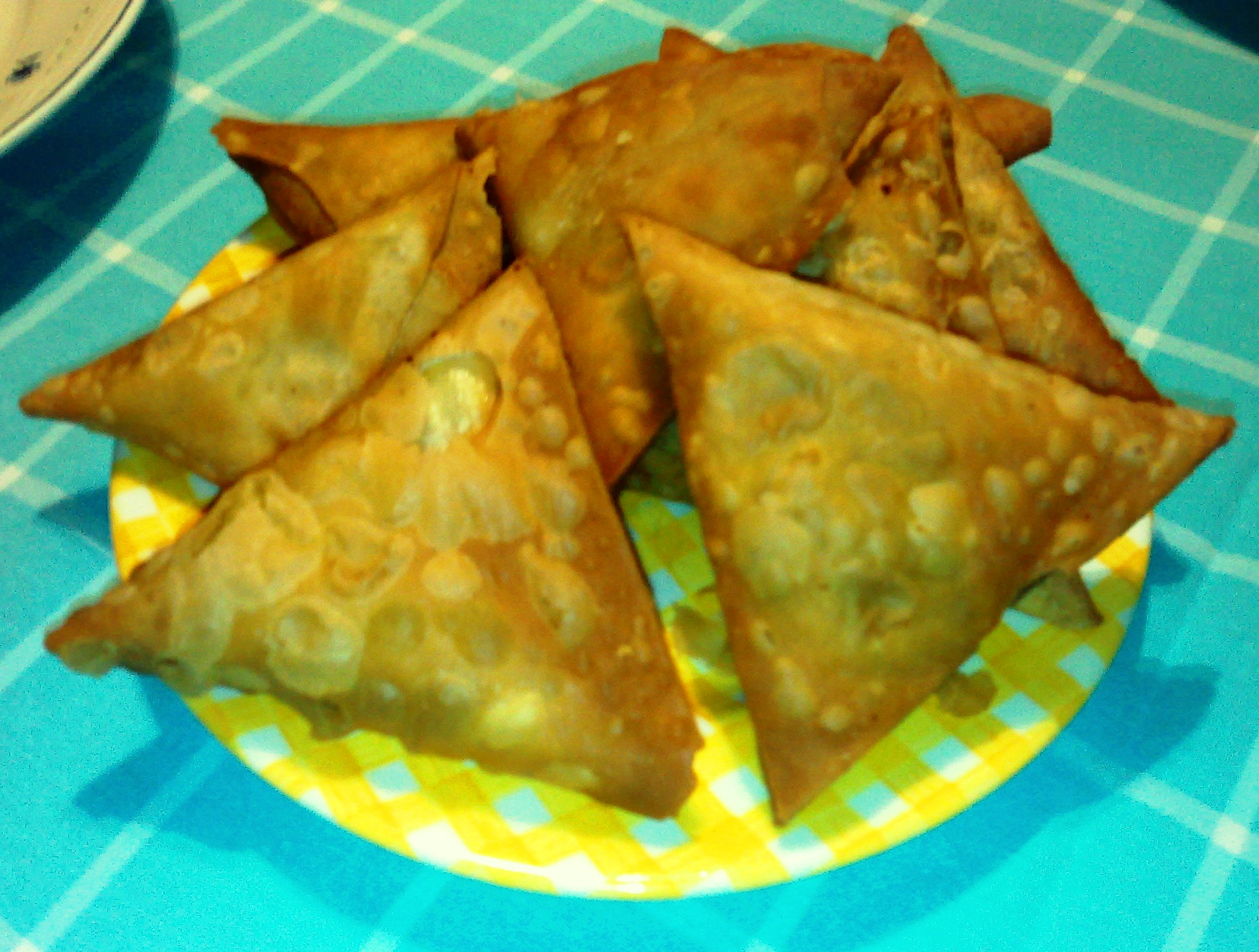
Goan chamuças

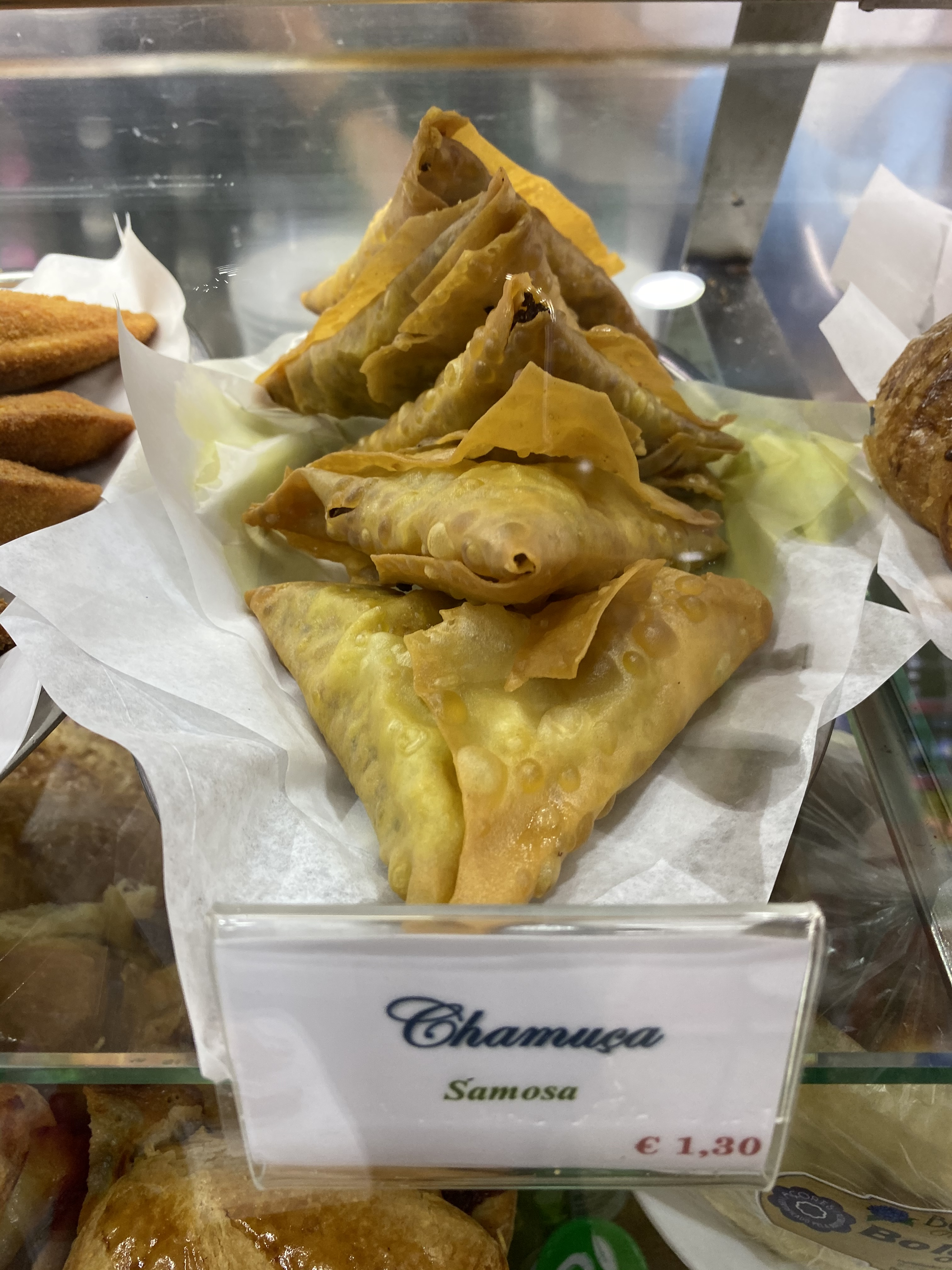
Portuguese chamuças
in Ponta Delgada, Azores

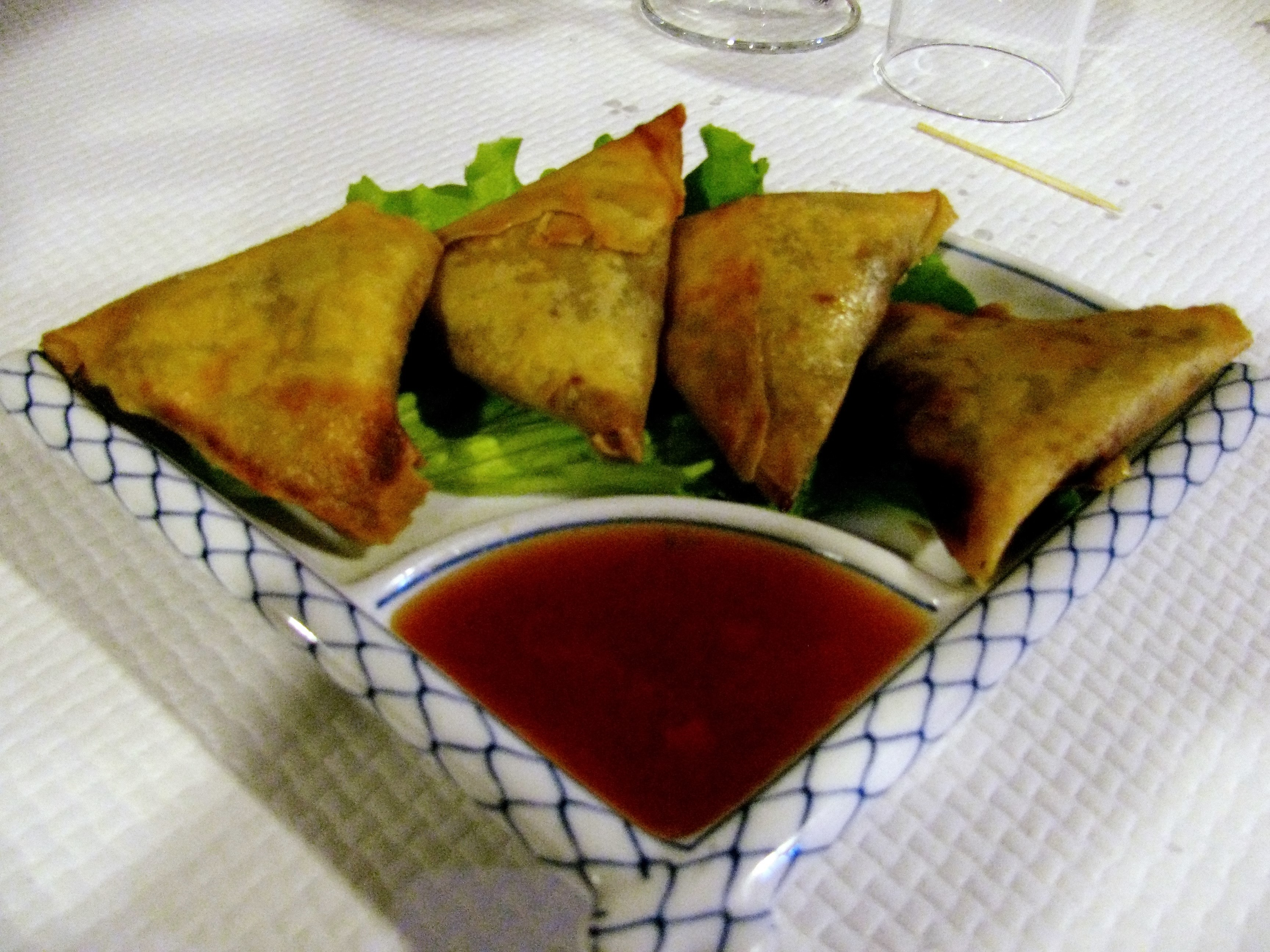
Angolan chamuças

=== English-speaking regions ===
Samosas are popular in the United Kingdom and the English-speaking Commonwealth including Canada, and in the United States. They may be called samboosa or sambusac, but in South Africa, they are often called samoosa. Frozen samosas are increasingly available. Variations can be made using filo, or flour tortillas.

== See also ==
- Aloo pie – Trinidadian fast food dish
- Bourekas – Filled turnover in Sephardic Jewish cuisine
- Chebureki – Crimean Tatar savoury pastry
- Cornish pasty – Pastry filled with meat or vegetables
- Curry puff – Pastry with curry filling
- Fatayer – Arab and Levantine stuffed pie
- Jiaozi – Chinese dumplings
- List of snack foods from the Indian subcontinent
- Turnover – Baked or fried filled good
- Echpochmak – Tatar and Bashkir national turnover dish
- Vada pav – Indian fast food item
