= Milton Keynes Civic Offices =

Municipal building in Milton Keynes, Buckinghamshire, England

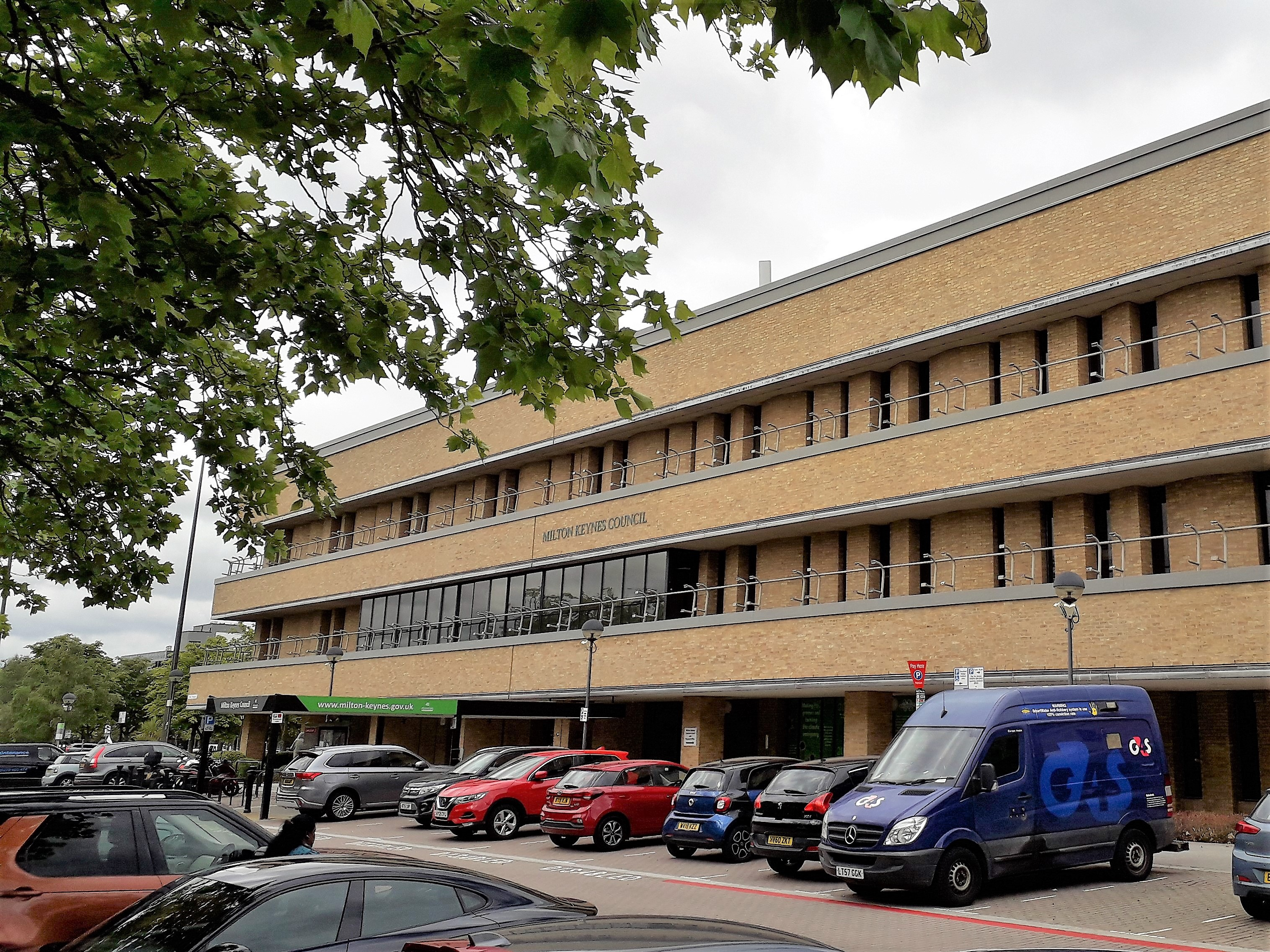
- The building in 2022
- Interactive map of the Milton Keynes Civic Offices area

General information
- Location: 1 Saxon Gate, Milton Keynes, MK9 3EJ, England
- Coordinates: 52.0434°N 0.7608°W
- Year built: 1979
- Client: Milton Keynes Borough Council

Design and construction
- Architects: Faulkner Brown; Hendy Watkinson Stonor

Website
- miltonkeynes.gov.uk

Milton Keynes Civic Offices is a municipal building at 1 Saxon Gate, Milton Keynes, a city in Buckinghamshire, in England. It accommodates the offices and meeting place of Milton Keynes City Council.

== History ==
After Milton Keynes was designated as a new town on 23 January 1967, the new Milton Keynes Development Corporation was initially based at Wavendon Tower in Wavendon. Following local government re-organisation in 1974, the new Milton Keynes Borough Council initially operated out of the offices of the five councils it had replaced, although it relocated to Sherwood House (later known as Challenge House) in Bletchley in late 1974.

The new borough council decided to commission dedicated civic offices. The site it selected was immediately to the southwest of the moot mound (meeting place) of the Anglo-Saxon Sigelai (or Secklow) Hundred, which dates back at least to the 13th century. The new building was designed by Faulkner Brown Hendy Watkinson Stonor in the modern style, built in yellow brick and glass, and was completed in 1979.

In June 2018, the borough council announced that the local register office would relocate from Bracknell House in Aylesbury Street (a villa dating from 1845) to the civic offices, with the result that most weddings and civil partnership ceremonies would also be held at the civic offices. A major programme of refurbishment works, which included the complete replacement of the air cooling system, was carried out at a cost of £11 million, and completed in 2020.

== Architecture ==
The three-storey building has a large, square, plan. The main entrance is formed by a porte-cochère on the southwest side. On the upper floors, cantilevered brick balconies run around the entire exterior. The windows are small, to minimise heat loss. When built, the building was surrounded by car parking, and behind it was a large, grassed area, with a water feature. In the centre of the building is a large council chamber.
