= Ni'matnāmah Naṣir al-Dīn Shāhī =

Medieval Indian cookbook

The Ni'matnāmah Naṣir al-Dīn Shāhī (Persian: نعمت‌نامه نصیرالدین‌شاهی, lit. 'Naṣir al-Dīn Shāh's Book of Delicacies'), is a medieval Indian cookbook, written in Persian language in Naskh script, of delicacies and recipes, some accompanied by paintings illustrating the preparation of the dishes. In addition to food, it also contained recipes for perfumes, lotions, incense, cosmetics, ailments, material related to sexual vitality (aphrodisiacs) and even a section on hunting. It was started for Ghiyath Shah (r. 1469–1500), the ruler of the Malwa Sultanate in central India. After he was forced to abdicate, it was completed for his son 'Abd al-Muzaffar Naṣir Shāh. (r. 1500–10).

== Manuscript history ==
After the fall of Mandu to the Mughals, the manuscript eventually found its way to the Bijapur in the 1600s, as shown by a seal of Muḥammad 'Adil Shāh on the flyleaf. It may have been part of the original Bijapur Collection. From Bijapur, it passed to Tipu Sultan and then to the library of the India Office. It is now in the India Office collections in the British Library, London. The original manuscript suffers from several gaps: eleven folios are missing, there are confirmed breaks in the Farsi foliation and non-matching catchwords, with four additional folios having been extracted before the royal library acquired it. The prelude to Ghiyath Shah's cuisine is currently missing, in addition to the beginning of the work. Furthermore, the muqaddama to Abd al-Muzaffar Nasir Shah's Ni'matnāmah is now belittled solely to a list of contents.

== Patronage ==
The Ni'matnāmah was made during the leadership of Sultan Ghiyath Shah (r. 1469–1500). Scholars describe Ghiyath Shah as a ruler who liked to indulge in cuisine, perfumes, and other luxuries, which is most likely why the manuscript was created. In Titley's translation, she describes how the work gives incite into Ghiyath Shah's life and tastes. After Ghiyath Shah stepped down, he left the project for his son ‘Abd al-Muzaffar Naṣir Shāh (r. 1500–1510). The British Library notes that the continuation of the manuscript across two reigns meant that it was valued at court and was more than an ordinary cookbook. Jonathan Bloom explains that works like the Ni‘matnāmah show how courts expressed identity through art and writing, which helps explain why both rulers supported its completion.

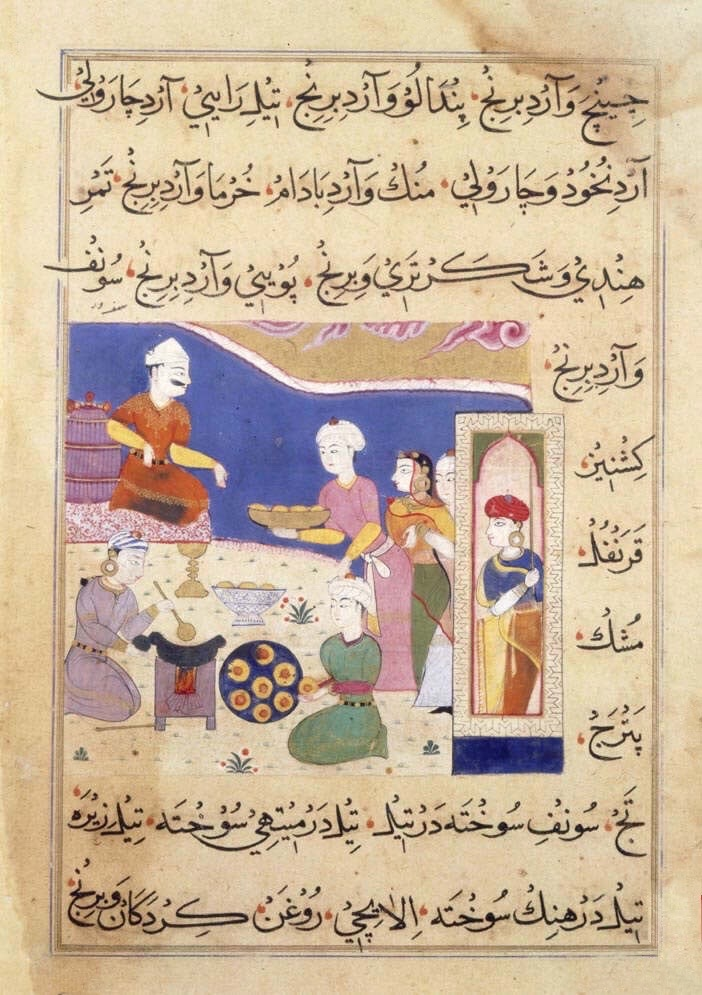
Illustrated page from the Ni'matnāmah showing the preparation of deep-fried delicacies and their presentation to the king. British Library IO Islamic 149.

== Translation and study ==
Titley's translation was published in 2004. The book provided a complete facsimile of the manuscript's folios and a detailed study of the terms for flora, fauna, food, and other substances, with their modern and Latin equivalents. The original manuscript is written in Urdu.

The manuscript even contains an image of Ghiyas al-Din eating a betel chew that is accompanied by text that describes the benefits and side effects of the betel leaf, such as the strengthening of teeth, disease prevention, the reduction of phlegm, purification of blood, and delayed ejaculation, amongst other various side effects.

== Art historical analysis ==
The Ni'matnāmah was first examined from the art historical point of view in 1959 by Robert Skelton (1929–2022), a life-long curator at the Victoria and Albert Museum. Skelton noted that some illustrations have women painted wearing men's various types of Persian and Indian garments and turbans, including a specific style of turban which is also featured in Turkman style paintings of 1470s. The style of the surrounding landscape are influenced by the Turkman style of the last third of the 15th century, suggested by art historian Yael Rice as a product of the transfer of people and objects from the Southern Iranian region. Art historians have also noted that at least two artists collaborated in illustrating the Ni'matnāmah. These artists emphasized different features of Turkman style of Shirazi painting that was contemporary at that time. The illustrations also introduced representations of indigenous costumes of Malwa and Indian facial types. Such stylistic innovations are also seen in paintings from the Cāurāpāñcāśikā series. This suggests that reciprocal influences were at work between centers of painting of Muslim and Hindu patronage.

=== Globalization and female slave labor in the Indian subcontinent ===
Art historian Yael Rice's analysis brings to light how the Ni'matnāmah demonstrates of male-centered authority. The manuscript features distantly procured spices such as nutmeg, cloves, saffron, and other ingredients to underscore the Malwa empire's expansive trade relationships and access to foreign commodities. The emphasis on trade and the sultanate's geographical horizons suggests the smaller, landlocked empire's desire to be perceived as a mighty kingdom akin to the Mughals, Ottomans, and Habsburgs. The presence of the naked Sultan in some illustrations is also described as showcasing the authority and globalized power of the Malwa Khalji kingdom.

Enslaved women from South Asia, Ethiopia, and Khorasan are portrayed in the manuscript cooking, serving food, massaging male figures, and other duties. This portrayal of the domestic and sexual expectation of the illustrated women is perceived to highlight the dynasty’s reliance on female slave labor to sustain its glory and luxury.

== See also ==
- List of medieval cookbooks
