= Jesmond Library =

Public library in Newcastle upon Tyne, England

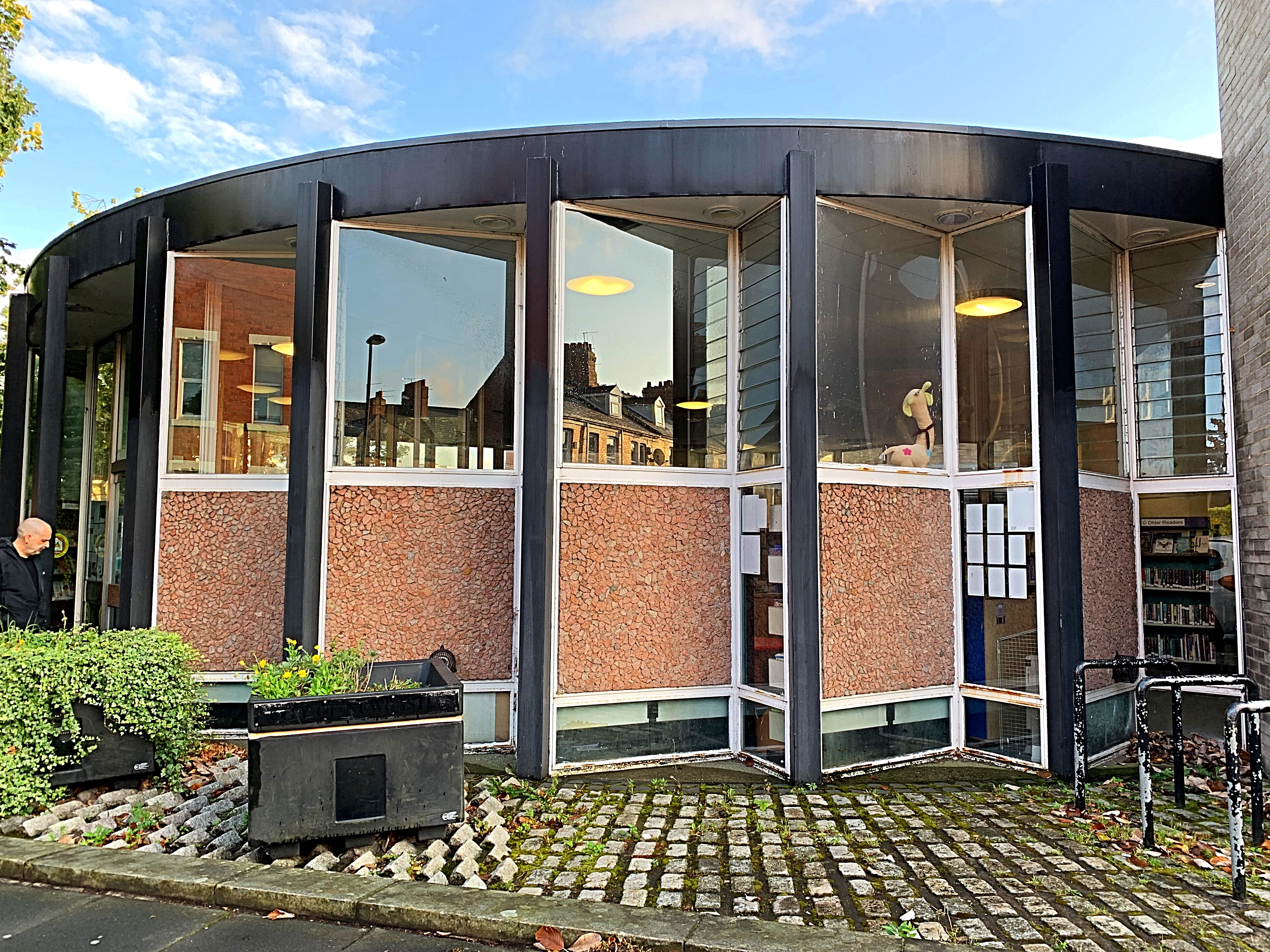
- Interactive map of the Jesmond Library area

General information
- Status: Grade II listed
- Location: Jesmond, St George's Terrace, Newcastle upon Tyne NE2 2DL, United Kingdom
- Coordinates: 54°59′35.740″N 1°36′23.040″W grid reference NZ 25281 66590
- Completed: 1963

Design and construction
- Architect: Harry Faulkner-Brown

Website
- jesmondlibrary.org

Jesmond Library is a public library in Jesmond, Newcastle upon Tyne, England, built in 1963. It is a Grade II listed building. Since 2013 it has been run by Friends of Jesmond Library, a group of local volunteers.

== Description ==
The building, designed by Harry Faulkner Brown of Williamson, Faulkner, Brown and Partners, was erected in 1962–63. It was awarded the RIBA Bronze Medal in 1965. Situated on a corner site, the lending area, connected to a two-storey administrative block, is a small circular building with a steel frame painted black, windows above precast panels of pink granite aggregate, and a flat roof. The external windows and panels have a sawtooth arrangement.

== Closure and re-opening ==
After a budget review, Newcastle City Council decided to reduce the number of libraries in the city, and announced in March 2013 that Jesmond Library would be closed. Subsequently, a group of local residents formed Friends of Jesmond Library, to oppose the closure, and with a contingency plan for volunteers to run the library. The library closed on 29 July 2013, and was re-opened by Friends of Jesmond Library, a limited company and a registered charity, on 21 September 2013.

The Council remains the owner of the building, and a 20-year lease with the council was signed on 1 July 2016. The number of library volunteers in 2017 was about 90. At the suggestion of local residents, the library is also a community hub.
