= 2026 Milton Keynes City Council election =

2026 English local government election

- 7 May 2026

All 60 seats to Milton Keynes City Council 31 seats needed for a majority
- Registered: 209,929
- Turnout: 85,474; 40.7%
	First party	Second party
Leader	Jane Carr	Peter Marland (retiring)
Party	Liberal Democrats	Labour
Last election	18 seats, 19.0%	30 seats, 38.3%
Seats before	18	30
Seats won	20	19
Seat change	▲2	▼11
Popular vote	44,293	53,203
Percentage	18.5%	22.2%
Swing	▼0.5pp	▼16.1pp
	Third party	Fourth party
Leader	Shanza Muzammil	None
Party	Conservative	Reform
Last election	9 seats, 32.4%	0 seats, 0.7%
Seats before	9	0
Seats won	12	9
Seat change	▲3	▲9
Popular vote	48,983	58,450
Percentage	20.5%	24.4%
Swing	▼11.9pp	▲23.7pp
Leader before election
Pete Marland
Labour Co-op
Leader after election
Jane Carr
Liberal Democrats
No overall control (Note: Liberal Democrats–Labour coalition.)

The 2026 Milton Keynes City Council election was held on 7 May 2026, alongside the other local elections across the United Kingdom being held on the same day, to elect all 60 members of Milton Keynes City Council. The whole council was up for election on new ward boundaries, with the number of seats increasing by 3 to 60.

Prior to the election, the council was under Labour majority control. Following the election, the council was under no overall control with the Liberal Democrats the largest party. A Liberal Democrat and Labour alliance subsequently formed to run the council, led by Liberal Democrat councillor Jane Carr.

== Background ==
In 2024, Labour retained control of the council. The leader of the council prior to the 2026 election, Peter Marland, did not stand for re-election.

== Council composition ==
After 2024 election		Before 2026 election		After 2026 election	
Party	Seats	Party	Seats	Party	Seats
Labour	30	Labour	30	Liberal Democrats	20
Liberal Democrats	18	Liberal Democrats	18	Labour	19
Conservative	9	Conservative	9	Conservative	12
Reform	0	Reform	0	Reform	9
Green	0	Green	0	Green	0
Independent	0	Independent	0	Independent	0
Heritage	0	Heritage	0	Heritage	0
Workers Party		Workers Party	0	Workers Party	0

Changes 2024–2026:

- August 2024: Emily Darlington (Labour) resigns – by-election held September 2024
- September 2024:
  - Saskia Soden (Labour) wins by-election
  - Robin Bradburn (Liberal Democrats) dies – by-election held November 2024
- October 2024: Kerrie Bradburn (Liberal Democrats) resigns – by-election held November 2024
- November 2024: Marie Bradburn (Liberal Democrats) (Note: Kerrie Bradburn is Robin Bradburn's daughter, and resigned her seat in Broughton to contest the Bradwell by-election.) and Clare Tevlin (Liberal Democrats) win by-elections

== Election result ==
2026 Milton Keynes City Council election
Party	Candidates	Seats	Gains	Losses	Net gain/loss	Seats %	Votes %	Votes	+/−
Liberal Democrats	60	20	N/A	N/A	▲2	33.3	18.5	44,293	–0.5
Labour	60	19	N/A	N/A	▼11	31.7	22.2	53,203	–16.1
Conservative	60	12	N/A	N/A	▲3	20.0	20.5	48,983	–11.9
Reform	60	9	N/A	N/A	▲9	15.0	24.4	58,450	+23.7
Green	60	0	N/A	N/A	Steady	0.0	13.8	32,886	+5.9
Independent	8	0	N/A	N/A	Steady	0.0	0.5	1,198	–0.4
Workers Party	1	0	N/A	N/A	Steady	0.0	<0.1	67	N/A
Heritage	1	0	N/A	N/A	Steady	0.0	<0.1	38	–0.1

== Ward results ==
=== Bletchley Park & Fenny Stratford ===
Bletchley Park & Fenny Stratford (3 seats)
Party	Candidate	Votes	%
Reform	Brad Connors	1,388	33.2
Reform	Sarah Tomlin	1,364	32.6
Reform	Ray Blackman	1,358	32.5
Labour	Nigel Long*	1,219	29.1
Labour	Waqas Ahmad*	1,200	28.7
Labour	Ayesha Khanom*	1,195	28.6
Conservative	Adam Rolfe	794	19.0
Conservative	Nabeel Nazir	735	17.6
Conservative	Mo Imran	724	17.3
Green	Hena Chowdhury	580	13.9
Green	Oliver Dudden	549	13.1
Green	Peter Pitfield	530	12.7
Liberal Democrats	Matt Drewett	337	8.1
Liberal Democrats	Caroline Picking	259	6.2
Liberal Democrats	Christy Amalu	242	5.8
Independent	Ammar Noorwali	41	1.0
Independent	Tariq Karim	36	0.9
Turnout		4,364	39.5
Registered electors		11,062	
Reform win (new seat)			
Reform win (new seat)			
Reform win (new seat)			

=== Bletchley South ===
Bletchley South (3 seats)
Party	Candidate	Votes	%
Labour	Ed Hume*	1,155	36.5
Reform	Jordan Cattell	1,132	35.7
Reform	Steve Swain	1,108	35.0
Reform	Anthony Wheeler	1,065	33.6
Labour	Mohammed Khan*	1,041	32.9
Labour	Melody Stephen	1,012	31.9
Green	Julie Embury	502	15.8
Green	Harry Watson	413	13.0
Conservative	Mohammed Bhatti	403	12.7
Green	Dami Oluyemi	402	12.7
Conservative	Dhirendra Mehta	382	12.1
Conservative	Taz Imran	371	11.7
Liberal Democrats	Graham Cuthbert	213	6.7
Liberal Democrats	Carol Vella	162	5.1
Liberal Democrats	Alfred Vella	142	4.5
Turnout		3,340	32.4
Registered electors		10,307	
Labour win (new seat)			
Reform win (new seat)			
Reform win (new seat)			

=== Bletchley West ===
Bletchley West (3 seats)
Party	Candidate	Votes	%	±%
Reform	Finlay Hughes	1,435	36.0	N/A
Reform	Melvyn Rook	1,385	34.8	N/A
Reform	Millie Rook	1,357	34.1	N/A
Labour	Mick Legg*	1,246	31.3	–17.1
Labour	Mandy Legg	1,177	29.5	–18.9
Labour	Tanjeela Sufi	998	25.0	–23.4
Conservative	Iain Stewart	834	20.9	–15.8
Conservative	Shery Delfani	751	18.8	–17.9
Conservative	Oliver Marlow	731	18.3	–18.4
Green	Joe French	464	11.6	+4.1
Green	Lacey Skinner	424	10.6	+3.1
Green	Sameer Sayed	387	9.7	+2.2
Liberal Democrats	Margaret Cullum	228	5.7	–0.6
Liberal Democrats	Ben Edwards	228	5.7	–0.6
Liberal Democrats	Sean McCabe	205	5.1	–1.2
Independent	Ray Brady	103	2.6	N/A
Turnout		4,210	40.7	+10.3
Registered electors		10,353		
Reform gain from Labour				
Reform gain from Labour				
Reform gain from Labour				

=== Bradwell ===
Bradwell (3 seats)
Party	Candidate	Votes	%	±%
Liberal Democrats	Kerrie Bradburn*	1,946	42.1	–11.4
Liberal Democrats	Marie Bradburn*	1,902	41.1	–12.4
Liberal Democrats	Rex Exon*	1,828	39.5	–14.0
Reform	Andrew Chester	1,246	26.9	N/A
Reform	Dave Grattan	1,167	25.2	N/A
Reform	Gowri Koyada	1,106	23.9	N/A
Labour	Zoe Nolan	676	14.6	–10.1
Green	Victoria Howlett	569	12.3	+4.9
Green	Frank Brown	564	12.2	+4.8
Labour	Carol Wood	562	12.2	–12.5
Labour	John Young	492	10.6	–14.1
Conservative	Krishna Panthula	478	10.3	–3.4
Green	Richie Sunasky	451	9.8	+2.4
Conservative	Urmi Chakraborty	450	9.7	–4.0
Conservative	Amitabh Roy	439	9.5	–4.2
Turnout		4,818	43.0	+12.9
Registered electors		11,210		
Liberal Democrats hold				
Liberal Democrats hold				
Liberal Democrats hold				

=== Broughton & Moulsoe ===
Broughton & Moulsoe (3 seats)
Party	Candidate	Votes	%
Liberal Democrats	Sam Crooks*	1,346	49.0
Liberal Democrats	Wing Tsang	1,108	40.3
Liberal Democrats	Nana Ofori-Atta	1,103	40.2
Reform	Derek Kilcoyne	561	20.4
Reform	Alan Lovell	554	20.2
Reform	Shaun Rose	531	19.3
Conservative	Victoria McLean	399	14.5
Conservative	Richard Marlow	390	14.2
Green	James Hadfield	384	14.0
Green	Michael Robinson	351	12.8
Labour	Madelaine O'Brien	335	12.2
Conservative	Steve Murray	330	12.0
Green	Daniel Simpson-Leek	293	10.7
Labour	Saskia Soden	282	10.3
Labour	Thomas Welch	235	8.6
Heritage	Alfred Saint-Clair	38	1.4
Turnout		2,868	30.3
Registered electors		9,463	
Liberal Democrats win (new seat)			
Liberal Democrats win (new seat)			
Liberal Democrats win (new seat)			

=== Campbell Park & Willen ===
Campbell Park & Willen (3 seats)
Party	Candidate	Votes	%
Liberal Democrats	Paul Trendall*	1,656	38.8
Liberal Democrats	Graham Eaton*	1,537	36.0
Liberal Democrats	Emily Ho	1,466	34.4
Reform	Chrissy Dingsdale	857	20.1
Reform	Paul Galvin	841	19.7
Reform	Ian Wilson	795	18.6
Conservative	Faye Carlisle	747	17.5
Labour	Lois Adura	745	17.5
Labour	Natalie Camacho	696	16.3
Conservative	Yusrah Kayani	681	16.0
Conservative	David Metanis	648	15.2
Labour	Mike Kasibo	609	14.3
Green	Soraya Billimoria	603	14.1
Green	Daniel Nelson	472	11.1
Green	Roy Westwood	442	10.4
Turnout		4,465	41.0
Registered electors		10,893	
Liberal Democrats win (new seat)			
Liberal Democrats win (new seat)			
Liberal Democrats win (new seat)			

=== Central Milton Keynes ===
Central Milton Keynes (3 seats)
Party	Candidate	Votes	%	±%
Labour	Elina Apse	1,025	36.8	–16.8
Labour	Jordan Coventry	917	32.9	–20.7
Labour	Darron Kendrick*	910	32.7	–20.9
Green	Evie Chance	589	21.1	+12.4
Reform	Anthea Nelmes	587	21.1	N/A
Reform	James Page	581	20.9	N/A
Reform	John Nelmes	572	20.5	N/A
Green	Paul Williams	536	19.2	+10.5
Green	Richard McCafferty	519	18.6	+9.9
Conservative	Chris Bertram-Gregory	458	16.4	–9.3
Conservative	Brian Hingley	432	15.5	–10.2
Liberal Democrats	Brian Greenwood	337	12.1	+0.8
Conservative	Ripal Parmar	337	12.1	–13.6
Liberal Democrats	Martin Clarke	330	11.8	+0.5
Liberal Democrats	Toni Zapata-Webborn	226	8.1	–3.2
Turnout		2,919	31.4	+7.7
Registered electors		9,293		
Labour hold				
Labour hold				
Labour hold				

=== Danesborough ===
Danesborough (3 seats)
Party	Candidate	Votes	%
Conservative	David Hopkins*	1,799	46.4
Conservative	Victoria Hopkins*	1,590	41.0
Conservative	Johnny Luk	1,478	38.1
Labour	Tracey Bailey*	1,143	29.5
Labour	Ian Stewart	813	21.0
Reform	Tony Fabrizio	726	18.7
Labour	Jasmine von Ballmoos	723	18.7
Reform	Dale Fiddy	711	18.3
Reform	Gary Singleton	658	17.0
Green	Simon Green	630	16.3
Green	Keith Kirby	390	10.1
Green	Dylan Ward	357	9.2
Liberal Democrats	Glen Dersley	242	6.2
Liberal Democrats	Adrian Dnes	195	5.0
Liberal Democrats	Peter Kelly	171	4.4
Turnout		4,019	34.6
Registered electors		11,626	
Conservative win (new seat)			
Conservative win (new seat)			
Conservative win (new seat)			

=== Furzton ===
Furzton (3 seats)
Party	Candidate	Votes	%
Liberal Democrats	Peter Cannon*	1,533	30.8
Liberal Democrats	Saleena Raja*	1,506	30.2
Liberal Democrats	Shawna Barnes	1,402	28.1
Reform	Peter Charles	1,373	27.5
Reform	Annabelle Grattan	1,327	26.6
Reform	Thomas Walker-Werth	1,278	25.6
Conservative	Rajini Arthur	1,134	22.7
Conservative	Ketan Kadakia	1,019	20.4
Conservative	James Marlow	966	19.4
Green	Iris Wright	636	12.8
Labour	Veronica Belcher	625	12.5
Green	Keith Brown	611	12.3
Green	Leonora Jackson	576	11.6
Labour	Udeh Christian-Iwuagwu	493	9.9
Labour	Thavapalan Vamathevan	475	9.5
Turnout		5,254	42.9
Registered electors		12,250	
Liberal Democrats win (new seat)			
Liberal Democrats win (new seat)			
Liberal Democrats win (new seat)			

=== Great Linford ===
Great Linford (3 seats)
Party	Candidate	Votes	%
Labour	George Thomas	1,384	32.6
Labour	Martin Petchey*	1,283	30.2
Labour	Naseem Khan*	1,267	29.8
Reform	Sean Porter	1,139	26.8
Reform	Gillian Holloway	1,131	26.6
Reform	Andrew Humphries	1,105	26.0
Liberal Democrats	Sophie Bell	852	20.0
Liberal Democrats	Perry Morgan	684	16.1
Green	Peter Edwards	674	15.9
Liberal Democrats	Alan Mallyon	643	15.1
Green	Rebecca Holden	540	12.7
Conservative	Frankie Geary	539	12.7
Green	Sean Ganley	476	11.2
Conservative	Deepa Ganapathula	459	10.8
Conservative	Geetha Morla	445	10.5
Independent	Matthew Fensome	129	3.0
Turnout		4,411	43.5
Registered electors		10,136	
Labour win (new seat)			
Labour win (new seat)			
Labour win (new seat)			

=== Hanslope ===
Hanslope
Party	Candidate	Votes	%
Conservative	Ali Andrew	1,011	48.5
Reform	Ian McDonald	496	23.8
Green	Jennifer Carter	293	14.1
Labour	Rachel James	187	9.0
Liberal Democrats	Rebecca Cave	97	4.7
Majority		515	24.7
Turnout		2,086	52.0
Registered electors		4,014	
Conservative win (new seat)			

=== New Bradwell ===
New Bradwell (2 seats)
Party	Candidate	Votes	%
Labour	Stephen Brown*	979	37.6
Labour	Shanika Mahendran*	837	32.1
Reform	Julian Camies	749	28.8
Reform	Andrew Naylor	678	26.0
Green	Alan Francis	616	23.6
Green	Gary Lloyd	429	16.5
Conservative	Babs Wright	315	12.1
Conservative	Pavankumar Divve	280	10.7
Liberal Democrats	Stephen Jones	174	6.7
Liberal Democrats	Tim Gomm	155	6.0
Turnout		2,723	37.6
Registered electors		7,237	
Labour win (new seat)			
Labour win (new seat)			

=== Newport Pagnell ===
Newport Pagnell (3 seats)
Party	Candidate	Votes	%
Liberal Democrats	Jane Carr*	2,584	49.7
Liberal Democrats	Andy Carr*	2,391	46.0
Liberal Democrats	Tony Oyakhire*	2,127	40.9
Reform	Lynn Cocksedge	1,311	25.2
Reform	Laurence Haig	1,261	24.3
Reform	Colin Rodden	1,217	23.4
Conservative	Sue Garner	985	19.0
Conservative	Kenny Choong	598	11.5
Conservative	Tiffany Joosten	582	11.2
Green	Adrian Yardley	563	10.8
Green	Jazz Tehara	461	8.9
Green	Glen Fry	452	8.7
Labour	Norman Miles	380	7.3
Labour	Angela Preece	352	6.8
Labour	Elaine Wales	327	6.3
Turnout		5,373	47.5
Registered electors		11,303	
Liberal Democrats win (new seat)			
Liberal Democrats win (new seat)			
Liberal Democrats win (new seat)			

=== Olney & Rural ===
Olney & Rural (3 seats)
Party	Candidate	Votes	%
Conservative	Peter Geary*	2,255	43.7
Conservative	Keith McLean*	2,210	42.8
Conservative	David Tyler	2,004	38.8
Reform	Malcolm Carter	1,319	25.5
Reform	Robert Blakemore	1,221	23.6
Reform	Tracey Knox	1,122	21.7
Green	Dan Rowland	951	18.4
Labour	Anthony Brown	727	14.1
Labour	Pamela Wilson	686	13.3
Green	Amy Mustard	637	18.4
Labour	Martin Rudd	615	11.9
Green	Duncan Carter	611	11.8
Liberal Democrats	Tara Jefferies	430	8.3
Liberal Democrats	Scott Humphries	426	8.2
Liberal Democrats	Andy Reilly	284	5.5
Turnout		5,341	50.5
Registered electors		10,570	
Conservative win (new seat)			
Conservative win (new seat)			
Conservative win (new seat)			

=== Ouzel Valley ===
Ouzel Valley (3 seats)
Party	Candidate	Votes	%
Liberal Democrats	Jenni Ferrans	1,338	38.0
Liberal Democrats	Uroy Clarke	1,311	37.3
Liberal Democrats	Macsene Isles-Ahite	1,076	30.6
Reform	Chris Curtis	873	24.8
Reform	Mark Lewis	840	23.9
Conservative	Charlotte Hall	751	21.3
Reform	Pascal Schumachers	744	21.2
Conservative	Darren Dorrington	616	17.5
Conservative	Enesha Mahbubani	492	14.0
Green	Nicholas Lynch	480	13.6
Labour	Harry Bancroft	470	13.4
Green	Helene Sovig	462	13.1
Green	Brian McGee	414	11.8
Labour	Florence Montague	350	9.9
Labour	Alex Mensah	336	9.6
Turnout		3,697	37.9
Registered electors		9,756	
Liberal Democrats win (new seat)			
Liberal Democrats win (new seat)			
Liberal Democrats win (new seat)			

=== Stony Stratford ===
Stony Stratford (3 seats)
Party	Candidate	Votes	%	±%
Labour	Jennifer Wilson-Marklew*	1,507	39.7	–10.8
Labour	Tabitha Brown	1,430	37.7	–12.8
Labour	Joe Hearnshaw*	1,372	36.1	–14.4
Conservative	Liam Andrews	979	25.8	–8.0
Conservative	Chris Wardle	805	21.2	–12.6
Reform	Vincent Peddle	789	20.8	N/A
Reform	David Priest	759	20.0	N/A
Conservative	Mark Hughes	713	18.8	–15.0
Reform	Nicholas Senogles	710	18.7	N/A
Green	David Lewis	669	17.6	+10.5
Green	Paul Bush	483	12.7	+5.6
Green	Derek Heath	399	10.5	+3.4
Liberal Democrats	Richard Greenwood	373	9.8	+1.9
Liberal Democrats	Denise Latner	214	5.6	–2.3
Liberal Democrats	Russell Houchin	190	5.0	–2.9
Turnout		3,946	44.8	+11.7
Registered electors		8,810		
Labour hold				
Labour hold				
Labour hold				

=== Tattenhoe ===
Tattenhoe (3 seats)
Party	Candidate	Votes	%	±%
Conservative	Manish Varma*	1,859	44.9	–3.7
Conservative	Shazna Muzammil*	1,817	43.9	–4.7
Conservative	Krish Pillai	1,583	38.2	–10.4
Labour	James Lancaster*	928	22.4	–16.7
Reform	David Edmonds	799	19.3	N/A
Reform	Mike McMahon	776	18.7	N/A
Labour	Hannah O'Neill	753	18.2	–20.9
Labour	Christian Durugo	747	18.0	–21.1
Reform	David Minty	743	18.0	N/A
Green	Kyle Riley	508	12.3	+5.5
Green	Lomas Patel	496	12.0	+5.2
Green	Lubaaba al-Azami	463	11.2	+4.4
Liberal Democrats	Justin Ko	459	11.1	+6.2
Liberal Democrats	Humna Raja	246	5.9	+1.0
Liberal Democrats	Asad Raja	240	5.8	+0.9
Turnout		4,320	43.9	+8.8
Registered electors		9,831		
Conservative hold				
Conservative hold				
Conservative gain from Labour				

=== Walton ===
Walton (3 seats)
Party	Candidate	Votes	%
Liberal Democrats	Duncan Banks*	1,357	32.0
Reform	Adrian Burton	1,270	30.0
Liberal Democrats	Ben Adewale*	1,241	29.3
Reform	Christopher Lock	1,227	29.0
Liberal Democrats	Clare Tevlin*	1,164	27.5
Reform	Sandip Sali	1,112	26.2
Conservative	Gabriel Costa	687	16.2
Conservative	Ade Adeliyi	682	16.1
Labour	Monica Dowling	674	15.9
Labour	Jasmine Messent	651	15.4
Labour	Tom Kelly	606	14.3
Conservative	Rishi Sharda	605	14.3
Green	Rhian Evans	527	12.4
Green	Hazel McGee	494	11.7
Green	Glen Moran	415	9.8
Turnout		4,418	41.9
Registered electors		10,534	
Liberal Democrats win (new seat)			
Reform win (new seat)			
Liberal Democrats win (new seat)			

=== Watling ===
Watling (3 seats)
Party	Candidate	Votes	%
Conservative	Amanda Marlow	1,630	29.2
Conservative	Kunal Puri	1,582	28.3
Labour	Leo Montague*	1,558	27.9
Labour	Akash Nayee*	1,554	27.8
Labour	Tina Jones	1,541	27.6
Conservative	Ash Jooston	1,503	26.9
Reform	Donald Hoyle	1,266	22.6
Reform	Timothy Prentice	1,192	21.3
Reform	Elaine Styles	1,168	20.9
Green	Sandra Blackledge	896	16.0
Green	Mary Moore	836	15.0
Green	Steve Porritt	711	12.7
Liberal Democrats	Garrath Green	528	9.4
Liberal Democrats	Rachel Davidge	465	8.3
Liberal Democrats	Tolu Fasanya	340	6.1
Turnout		5,768	44.3
Registered electors		13,027	
Conservative win (new seat)			
Conservative win (new seat)			
Labour win (new seat)			

=== Wolverton ===
Wolverton (3 seats)
Party	Candidate	Votes	%	±%
Labour	Ansar Hussain*	1,539	38.8	–18.1
Labour	Lauren Townsend*	1,529	38.5	–18.4
Labour	Victoria Bamisile*	1,461	36.8	–20.1
Green	Tom Bulman	1,367	34.4	+17.6
Green	Nicky Kenny	1,066	26.9	+10.1
Green	Catherine Leigh	1,045	26.3	+9.5
Reform	David Allott	828	20.9	N/A
Reform	Joseph Howard	747	18.8	N/A
Reform	Jack Lang	720	18.1	N/A
Conservative	Elizabeth Marlow	331	8.3	–9.3
Conservative	Gillian Perris	272	6.9	–10.7
Conservative	Iulian Ungureanu	220	5.5	–12.1
Liberal Democrats	Matt Hinton	203	5.1	–3.1
Liberal Democrats	Catriona McMahon	196	4.9	–3.3
Liberal Democrats	Edis Bevan	192	4.8	–3.4
Independent	Jeremy Penwarden	124	3.1	N/A
Workers Party	Charlie Toes	67	1.7	N/A
Turnout		4,172	41.7	+13.4
Registered electors		10,015		
Labour hold				
Labour hold				
Labour hold				

=== Woughton & Fishermead ===
Woughton & Fishermead (3 seats)
Party	Candidate	Votes	%	±%
Labour	Peter Bakare	1,090	39.1	–24.1
Labour	Donna Fuller*	1,080	38.8	–24.4
Labour	Amber McQuillan*	982	35.3	–27.9
Reform	Phil Haslam	706	25.3	N/A
Reform	Gary Toms	695	25.0	N/A
Reform	Trudy Munyongani	674	24.2	N/A
Green	Catherine Payne	434	15.6	+5.9
Green	Simon Jackson	424	15.2	+5.5
Green	Mark Morris	370	13.3	+3.6
Independent	Tony Coughlan	303	10.9	N/A
Conservative	Edith Bald	254	9.1	–10.8
Independent	Leigh-Anne Perryman	242	8.7	N/A
Conservative	John Howe	222	8.0	–11.9
Independent	Jane Whild	220	7.9	N/A
Conservative	Aparna Patllola	197	7.1	–12.8
Liberal Democrats	Jeannie Bartrick	169	6.1	–0.5
Liberal Democrats	James Bartrick	166	6.0	–0.6
Liberal Democrats	Jonathan Le Crette	128	4.6	–2.0
Turnout		2,962	24.7	+5.5
Registered electors		10,824		
Labour hold				
Labour hold				
Labour hold				

== Aftermath ==
Following the election, a Liberal Democrat and Labour alliance formed to run the council. Liberal Democrat councillor Jane Carr was appointed as leader of the council at the subsequent annual council meeting on 20 May 2026.

=== New Bradwell by-election ===
A by-election was called in New Bradwell ward, following the death of Labour councillor Shanika Mahendran.

New Bradwell by-election, 24th September 2026
Party	Candidate	Votes	%	±%
Labour	Tracey Bailey	1,023	54.2	+19.7
Reform	Julian Camies	441	23.4	−3.1
Green	Alan Francis	175	9.3	−12.5
Conservative	Gabriel Costa	160	8.5	−2.6
Liberal Democrats	Martin Clarke	87	4.6	−1.5
Majority		582	30.8	N/A
Turnout		1891	25.9	−11.7
Labour hold		Swing		
