= Sir James Foulis, 5th Baronet =

Sir James Foulis, 5th Baronet (1714–1791) was the fifth Baronet of Colinton and an antiquarian.

He was the eldest son of Henry Foulis, third son of the third baronet He succeeded his uncle, the fourth Baronet, in July 1742. In his youth he was an officer in the army, but he retired from the service early, and devoted himself to the pursuits of a country gentleman and to literature. He occupied the Castle of Colinton having inherited lands there and mills nearby. He married a Mary Wightman and had sons, James and Henry, and a daughter, Elizabeth.

Foulis died at Colinton, near Edinburgh, on 3 January 1791.

== Works ==
He in 1781 contributed to the 'Transactions of the Antiquarian Society of Scotland' a dissertation on the origin of the Scots, based on the ancient Celtic language. He also left among his papers for posthumous publication memoranda of a series of investigations into the origin of the ancient names of places in Scotland.

Baronetage of Nova Scotia
Preceded by James Foulis	Baronet (of Colinton); 1742–1791	Succeeded by James Foulis
