= Bijapur Collection =

Collection of Arabic and Persian manuscripts from Bijapur

The Bijapur Collection is a collection of manuscripts held primarily in the India Office collections at the British Library.

== History ==
The manuscripts, largely in Arabic with some in Persian, were originally part of the Adil Shahi royal library with many carrying seals of the Adil Shahi rulers. At some point in their history, the manuscripts were removed to the Ashar Mahal (الشّعر محل). The building was home to a college and theological school founded by Mohammed Adil Shah, Sultan of Bijapur, to house a relic of the Prophet.

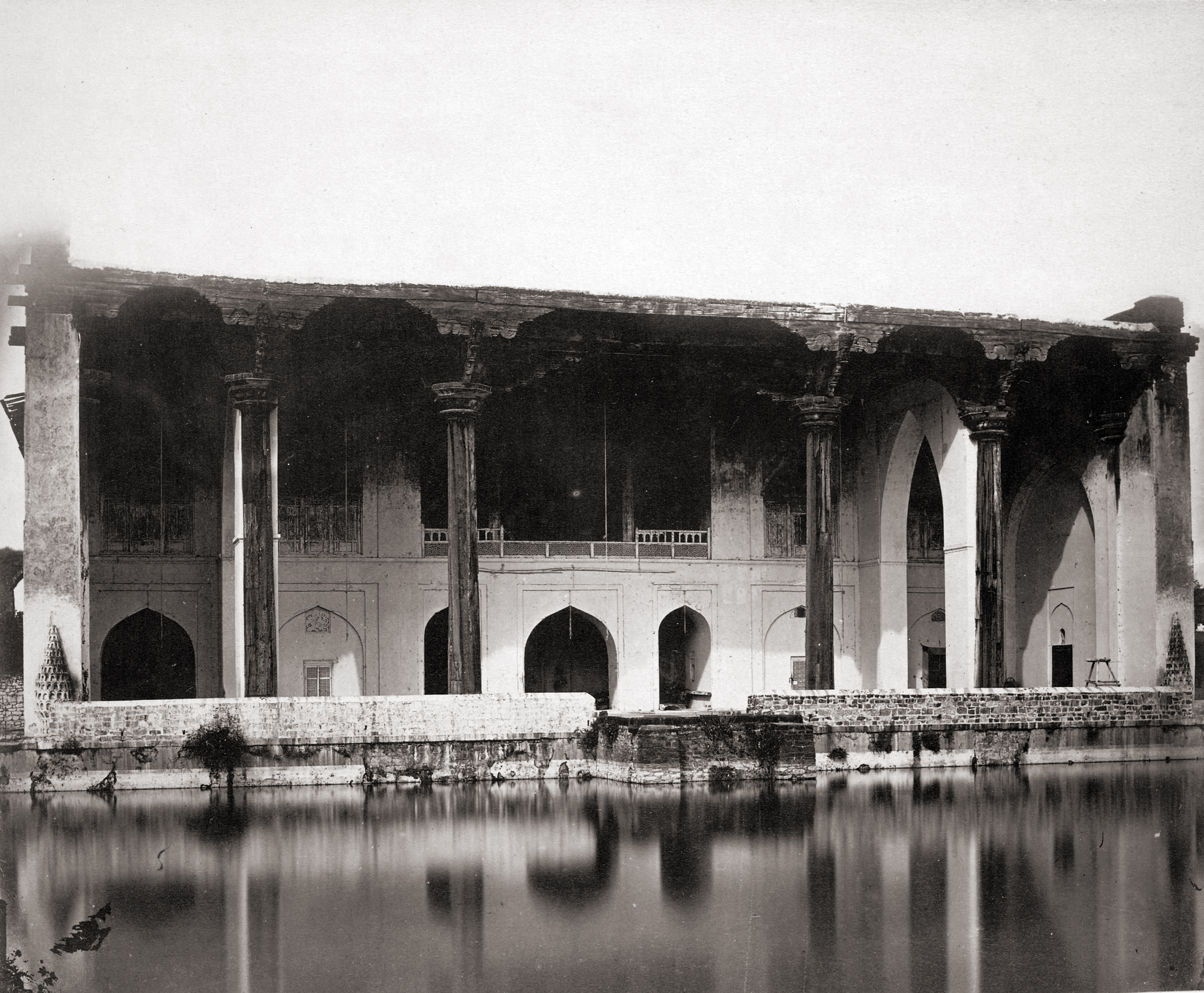
Exterior of the Ashar Mahal, Bijapur, as documented in 1875 (Photo: British Library).

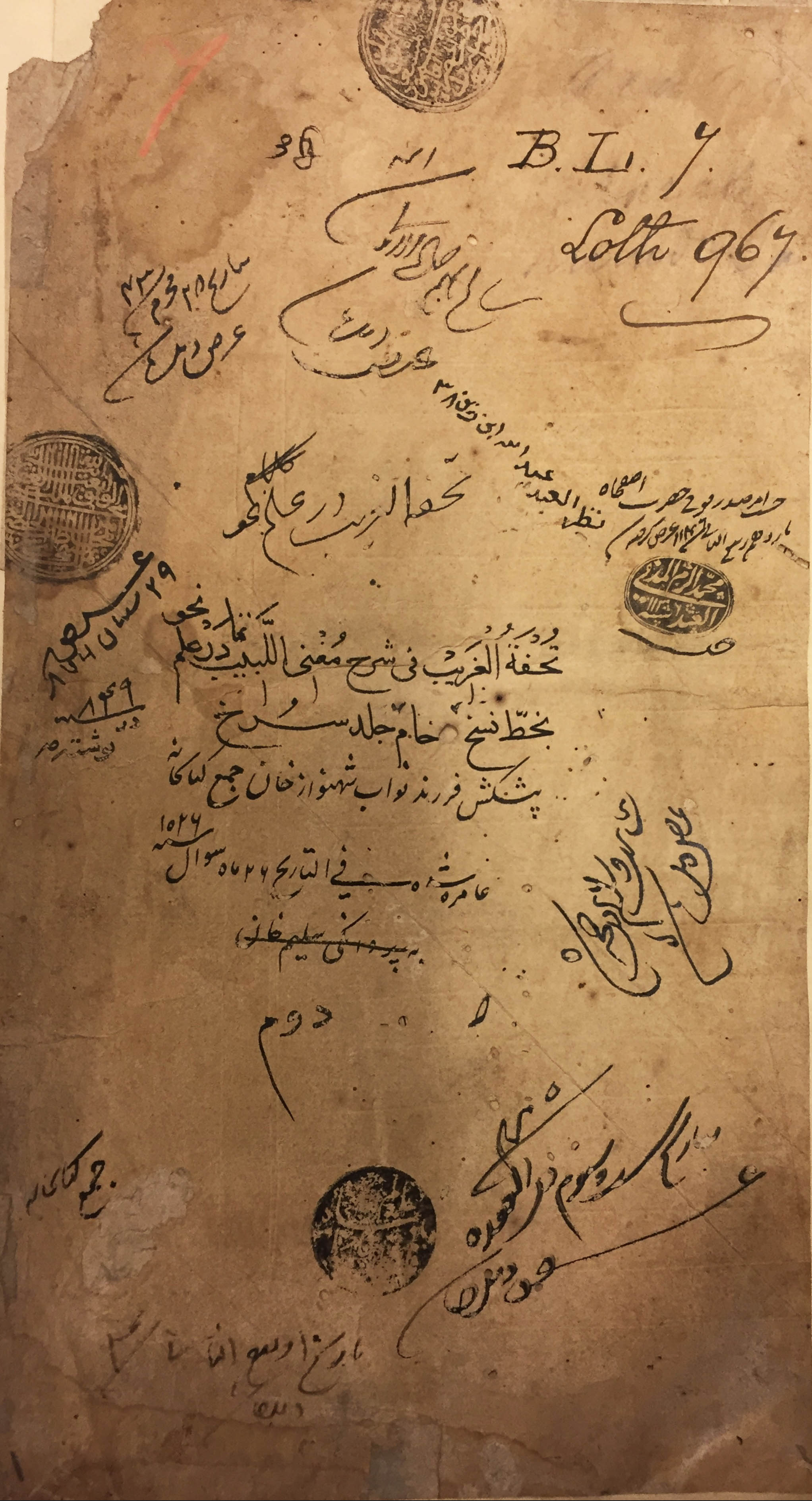
Page from the commentary on ʻAbd Allāh ibn Hishām al-Anṣārī's work Mughnī al-labīb by Muḥammad b. Abī Bakr ad-Damāmīnī (d. circa 1424) with seals of Mahmud Gawan. British Library, India Office, IO Bijapur 7, Otto Loth's Catalogue, no. 967.

In 1848, Bijapur was annexed by the British and the library and institution were found to have no funds for their support. The scholar Charles d'Ochoa visited between 1841 and 1843, and arranged the manuscripts, separating "those preserved from the those utterly destroyed." Subsequently Henry Bartle Frere, the commissioner of the area, had a catalogue of the Bijapur collection prepared in Urdu by Hamīd al-din Ḥakīm, and that was translated into English by William Erskine (1773-1852). Following an examination of the catalogue by one John Wilson, assisted by local scholars, it was decided that the whole collection should be sent to the Court of Directors of the East India Company in London. The manuscripts were dispatched in 1853.

Other parts of the Bijapur library went separate ways and are in the Raza Library, Rampur, the Salar Jung Museum, Hyderabad, the Bibliothèque nationale de France, St. Petersburg, the Museum of Islamic Art, Doha, and the University of St Andrews Library. Items in the Marathi language collected by Ch. d'Ochoa in the Deccan are held in the Bibliothèque Nationale de France.

The India office parts were catalogued, with other Arabic manuscripts from India, by Otto Loth (1844–1881) and published in 1877. After a considerable hiatus, Qureshi provided a summary of the collection in 1980, but no in-depth analysis undertaken until 2016 when Overton examined some of the notations, seals and bindings.
