= University of St Andrews Library =

Library in Scotland

Coordinates: 56.3391°N 2.7938°W

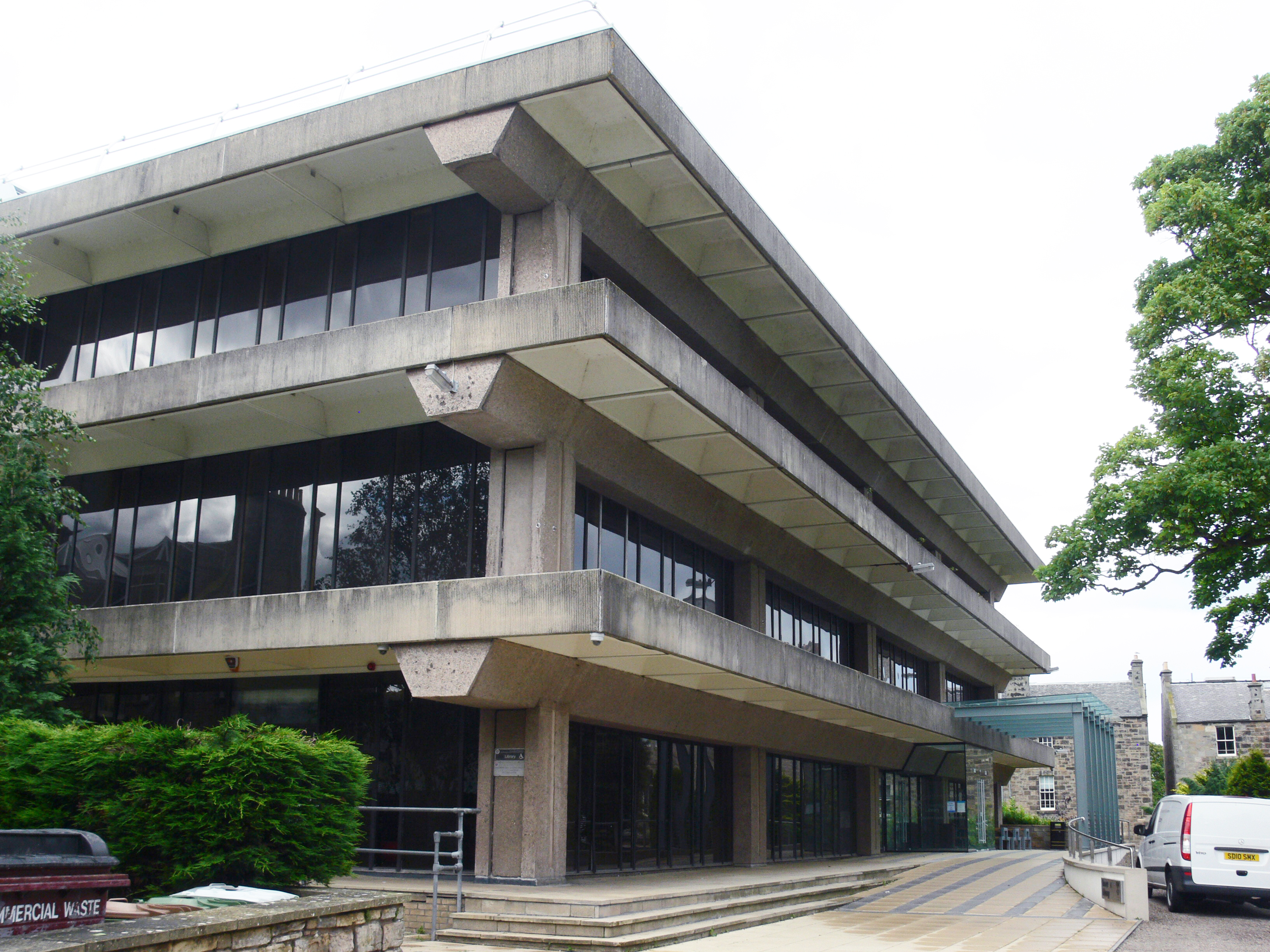
University of St Andrews library building

The University of St Andrews Library dates back to the early 17th century but its books have been collected over some 600 years since the university was founded in 1413. It holds one of the most extensive collections of the research libraries in the United Kingdom with more than one million volumes. In addition to 210,000 printed books in special collections, it has large manuscript and photographic collections while its archives date back to the early 15th century. The library's current role is to support research, scholarship and learning with high-quality services backed by preservation, promotion and exploitation of its collections.

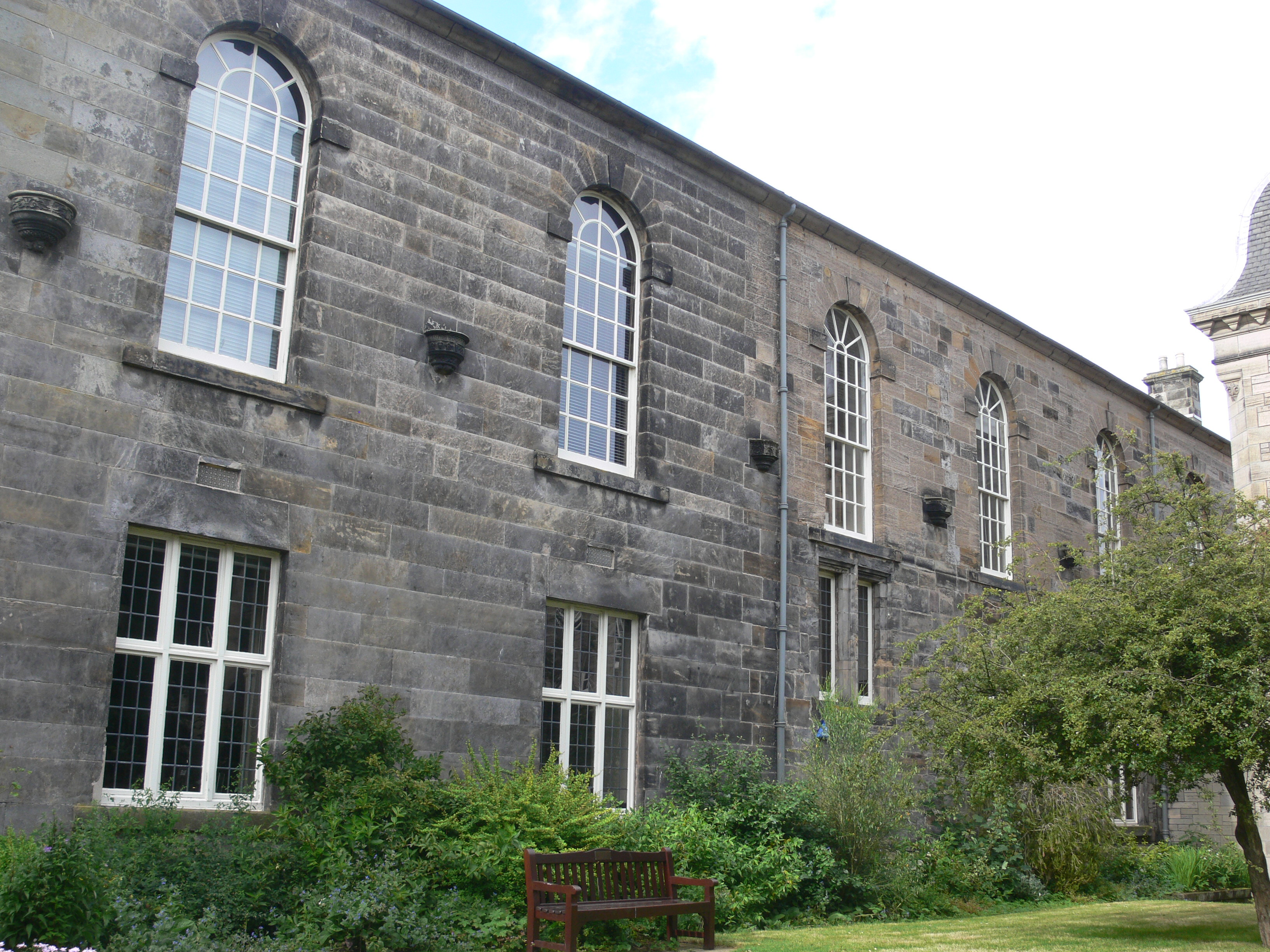
King James Library from St Mary's quad

== History ==
The library was founded by James VI of Scotland in 1612 with gifts from the Royal Family, the Archbishop of Canterbury and the Royal Librarian. Originally known as the King James Library, its building was completed in 1643. Between 1710 and 1836, under the Copyright Deposit Act it was entitled to a copy of every book printed in the British Isles. It is therefore exceptionally rich in material from the 18th century. Visiting the library in 1773, Samuel Johnson described it as "not very spacious, but elegant and luminous". In 1783, the King James Library, St Mary's College Library and the university's other library facilities were brought together under one roof as the common library.

By the mid-19th century, its collection had grown to 40,000 volumes. After extensions in 1890, a new library was completed in 1908 in what is now the Psychology building. As a result of further increases in students and holdings, today's library building was opened on North Street in 1976 where it now holds over a million books. The building was designed by the architects Faulkner-Brown, Hendy Watkinson Stonor based in the North East of England at Killingworth. Faulkner-Brown specialised in libraries and leisure facilities and also designed the National Library of Canada in Ottawa and the Robinson Library at Newcastle University In 2011 the main library building underwent a £7 million re-development. St Mary's College Library incorporating the King James library from 1643 continues to house the university's Divinity and Medieval History collections.

In 2012 the university purchased the vacant Martyrs' Kirk on North Street, with the purpose of providing reading rooms for the Special Collections department and university postgraduate research students and staff.

== Special collections ==
Dating from the early Middle Ages, material in the Manuscript Department includes muniments of the university itself as well as estate, business and personal records from the Fife region and the town of St Andrews. There are also manuscript papers on Baron Friedrich von Hügel and other individuals belonging to the Catholic Modernists.

The library's archive contains a rich series of catalogues from its foundation as well as borrowing registers from 1738 to 1925.

Comprising some 300,000 images, the photographic collection is one of Scotland's largest. It includes early examples of St Andrew's involvement in the history of photography as well as published and unpublished items and albums from the 1840s on. Of particular importance is the negative archive of picture postcards from Valentine & Sons of Dundee from the mid-19th century to the 1960s. It also contains the negatives of the local press photographer George M. Cowie and of the botanist Robert M. Adam.

The rare books collections comprise over 50 named collections comprising gifts from other libraries and subject-based collections based on illustrated children's literature and photographically illustrated books.

The historic Copyright Music Collection consists of some 400 bound volumes, most of the music dating from the 1790s to the 1820s.
