= Harry Faulkner-Brown =

Architect (1920–2008)

Harry Faulkner-Brown (4 December 1920 – 10 February 2008) was a British architect known for his work on the Newcastle Metro.

== Biography ==
Faulkner-Brown began his architectural studies at King's College, Newcastle and worked as a studio assistant during this time.

In the Second World War, Faulkner-Brown served with the Royal Engineers, involved in the construction of bridges, pontoons, and causeways. He subsequently trained with the Durham Light Infantry and participated as a paratrooper in Operation Market Garden in 1944. His wartime efforts, particularly at Oosterbeek, earned him the Military Cross. By 1945, he and his squadron took part in the disarmament of the German Army in Norway.

After the war, Faulkner-Brown completed his architectural studies and relocated to Canada for 12 years, where he designed several libraries, including the National Library of Canada in Ottawa. He returned to Newcastle in 1962 and co-founded Williamson, Faulkner-Brown and Partners in 1963. The firm was responsible for projects such as the Jesmond Library and the Newcastle Metro design, which was inaugurated in 1981, as well as the Manchester Velodrome and the Manchester Aquatics Centre.

His "ten commandments" for library design became reference points in the field, emphasizing aspects such as adaptability and security. This framework was considered by various global institutions when designing their libraries. In 1992, Faulkner-Brown published The role of architecture and design in a security strategy as a chapter in the book Security and Crime Prevention in Libraries.

In 1982, Faulkner-Brown was awarded an OBE for his contributions to architecture and social services. He authored A Sapper at Arnhem.
