= Milton Keynes City Council elections =

Elections to the Council of the City of Milton Keynes

Milton Keynes City Council is the local authority and unitary authority for the City of Milton Keynes, a borough in Buckinghamshire, England.

== Council composition ==
Below is the full seat composition in Milton Keynes after each local election. The normal election pattern is that one-third of seats are re-elected every year except that there is (normally) no election every fourth year. In 1976, 1996, 2002 and 2014, the whole council was elected after boundary changes. In 1991, ward boundaries were changed but the number of seats remained the same. In 2026, the number of seats will increase to 60 and all seats will be contested.

Table key
Administration in charge of council after election.
Party did not exist or contest elections.

Milton Keynes City Council (2023–Present)

Year	Seats			Con	Lab	LD	Ref	Others
Year	Total	Contested	Majority					Others
2023	57	20	29	17	25	15	0	0 Green; Heritage; Women's Equality
2024	57	19	29	9	30	18	0	0 Green; Heritage
2026	60	60	31	12	19	20	9	0 Green; Heritage; Workers Party

Milton Keynes Council (1997 – 2023)

Year	Seats			Con	Lab	LD	UKIP	Independent	Others
Year	Total	Contested	Majority						Others
1998	51	17	26	4	27	19		1	
1999	51	17	26	4	27	19		1	0 Green; Campaign for Disabled
2000	51	17	26	8	22	20		1	0 Green
2002	51	51	26	8	16	27	0	0	0 Green
2003	51	17	26	7	16	27	0	1	0 Green
2004	51	17	26	7	16	27	0	1	0 Green
2006	51	17	26	13	15	23	0	0	0 Better MK Independent; CPA; Green
2007	51	17	26	15	13	22	0	1	0 Green
2008	51	17	26	20	10	21	0	0	0 England First; Green
2010	51	17	26	17	9	24	0	1	0 BNP; Green
2011	51	17	26	21	9	18	0	3	0 Green
2012	51	17	26	20	16	15	0	0	0 Green
2014	57	57	29	18	25	13	1	0	0 Green; TUSC
2015	57	19	29	22	23	12	0	0	0 Green; Left Unity; TUSC
2016	57	20	29	22	22	13	0	0	0 Green
2018	57	20	29	24	21	12	0	0	0 Green
2019	57	19	29	19	23	15	0	0	0 Green; Women's Equality
2021	57	19	29	24	19	13	0	1	0 Green; Heritage; Reform UK; Women's Equality
2022	57	19	29	22	20	14		1	0 Green; Women's Equality

Milton Keynes Borough Council (1974 – 1997)

Year	Seats			Con	Lab	LD	Lib	SDP	Independent	Others
Year	Total	Contested	Majority							Others
1976	46	46	24	33	12		0		1	0 Communist
1978	46	15	24	32	14		0			0 Communist
1979	46	16	24	31	15		0			0 National Front
1980	46	16	24	26	19		1			0 National Front
1982	46	16	24	22	17		6		1	0 BNP; Communist; Ecology
1983	46	15	24	20	18		7		1	0 Ecology
1984	46	16	24	17 or 18	17 or 20		7 or 9		1 or 2	0 Ecology; Independent Conservative
1986	46	15	24	12	19		13		2	0 Green
1987	46	15	24	11	18		14		3	0 Green
1988	46	16	24	13	18	13			2	0 Green
1990	46	15	24	13	24	7			2	0 Green
1991	46	15	24	13	25	17			0	0 Green
1992	46	16	24	15	21	9			1	0 Green
1994	46	15	24	14	19	11			2	0 Green
1995	46	16	24	12	21	10			3	0 Green
1996	51	51	26	2	20	18			1	0 Green

Milton Keynes District Council (1973 – 1974)

Year	Seats			Con	Lab	Lib	Independent	Others
Year	Total	Contested	Majority					Others
1973	40	40	21	8	27	0	5	0 Communist

Milton Keynes within Buckinghamshire County Council (1967 – 1973)

=== By ward ===
==== 2002 to 2012 ====
The composition of Milton Keynes Council following each election was as follows.

	2002	2003	2004	2006	2007	2008	2010	2011	2012
Bletchley & Fenny Stratford	Lab 3	Lab 3	Lab 3	Lab 2/Con 1	Con 2/Lab 1	Con 3	Con 3	Con 3	Con 2/Lab 1
Bradwell	Lib 3	Lib 3	Lib 3	Lib 3	Lib 3	Lib 3	Lib 3	Lib 3	Lib 2/Lab 1
Campbell Park	Lib 3	Lib 3	Lib 3	Lib 3	Lib 3	Lib 3	Lib 3	Lib 3	Lib 2/Lab 1
Danesborough	Con 1	Con 1	Con 1	Con 1	Con 1	Con 1	Con 1	Con 1	Con 1
Denbigh	Lab 2	Lab 2	Lab 2	Lab 2	Lab 2	Lab 2	Lab 2	Lab 2	Lab 2
Eaton Manor	Lab 2	Lab 2	Lab 2	Lab 2	Lab 2	Lab 2	Lab 2	Lab 2	Lab 2
Emerson Valley	Lib 3	Lib 3	Lib 3	Lib 3	Lib 3	Lib 2/Con 1	Lib 2/Con 1	Con 2/Lib 1	Con 2/Lib 1
Furzton	Lib 2	Lib 2	Lib 2	Lib 2	Lib 2	Lib 2	Lib 2	Lib 2	Lib 2
Hanslope	Con 1	Con 1	Con 1	Con 1	Con 1	Con 1	Con 1	Con 1	Con 1
Linford North	Lib 2	Lib 2	Lib 2	Lib 1/Con 1	Lib 1/Con 1	Lib 1/Con 1	Lib 2	Lib 2	Lib 2
Linford South	Lib 2	Lib 2	Lib 2	Lib 1/Con 1	Lib 1/Con 1	Lib 1/Con 1	Lib 2	Lib 1/Con 1	Lib 1/Con 1
Loughton Park	Con 3	Con 3	Con 3	Con 3	Con 3	Con 3	Con 3	Con 3	Con 3
Middleton	Lib 2	Lib 2	Lib 2	Lib 2	Lib 1/Con 1	Lib 1/Con 1	Lib 1/Con 1	Lib 1/Con 1	Con 2
Newport Pagnell North	Lib 2	Lib 2	Lib 2	Lib 2	Lib 2	Lib 2	Lib 2	Lib 2	Lib 2
Newport Pagnell South	Lib 2	Lib 2	Lib 2	Lib 2	Lib 2	Lib 2	Lib 2	Lib 2	Lib 2
Olney	Lib 2	Lib 2	Lib 2	Lib 1/Con 1	Lib 1/Con 1	Con 2	Con 2	Con 2	Con 2
Sherington	Lib 1	Lib 1	Lib 1	Lib 1	Lib 1	Lib 1	Lib 1	Con 1	Con 1
Stantonbury	Lab 2	Lab 2	Lab 2	Lab 2	Lab 2	Lab 1/Con 1	Lab 1/Con 1	Lab 1/Con 1	Lab 2
Stony Stratford	Con 3	Con 3	Con 3	Con 3	Con 3	Con 3	Con 3	Con 3	Con 3
Walton Park	Lib 3	Lib 3	Lib 3	Lib 2/Con 1	Lib 2/Con 1	Lib 2/Con 1	Lib 3	Lib 2/Con 1	Con 2/Lib 1
Whaddon	Lab 2	Lab 2	Lab 2	Lab 2	Lab 2	Lab 2	Lab 2	Lab 2	Lab 2
Wolverton	Lab 3	Lab 3	Lab 3	Lab 3	Lab 3	Lab 2/Lib 1	Lab 2/Lib 1	Lab 2/Lib 1	Lab 3
Woughton	Lab 2	Lab 2	Lab 2	Lab 2	Lab 2	Lab 2	Lab 2	Lab 2	Lab 2

==== 2014 to 2026 ====
In 2014, the boundaries were revised so that there were 57 seats and each ward had three seats each [see below]. Elections were held for all seats in that year, before returning to the one-third model for subsequent years.

	2014	2015	2016	2018	2019	2021	2022	2023	2024
Bletchley East	Lab 2/UKIP 1	Lab 3	Lab 3	Lab 3	Lab 3	Lab 3	Lab 3	Lab 3	Lab 3
Bletchley Park	Lab 2/Con 1	Lab 2/Con 1	Lab 2/Con 1	Con 2/Lab 1	Con 2/Lab 1	Con 3	Con 2/Lab 1	Lab 2/Con 1	Lab 3
Bletchley West	Lab 3	Lab 2/Con 1	Lab 2/Con 1	Lab 2/Con 1	Lab 3	Lab 2/Con 1	Lab 2/Con 1	Lab 2/Con 1	Lab 3
Bradwell	Lab 2/Lib 1	Lib 2/Lab 1	Lib 3	Lib 3	Lib 3	Lib 3	Lib 3	Lib 3	Lib 3
Broughton	Con 2/Lib 1	Con 2/Lib 1	Con 2/Lib 1	Con 2/Lib 1	Lib 2/Con 1	Lib 3	Lib 3	Lib 3	Lib 3
Campbell Park & Old Woughton	Lib 2/Con 1	Lib 2/Con 1	Lib 2/Con 1	Con 2/Lib 1	Lib 2/Con 1	Con 2/Lib 1	Lib 2/Con 1	Lib 2/Con 1	Lib 3
Central Milton Keynes	Lab 3	Lab 3	Lab 3	Lab 3	Lab 3	Lab 3	Lab 3	Lab 3	Lab 3
Danesborough & Walton	Con 3	Con 3	Con 3	Con 3	Con 3	Con 3	Con 3	Con 2/Lab 1	Con 2/Lab 1
Loughton & Shenley	Lab 2/Con 1	Lab 2/Con 1	Lab 2/Con 1	Con 2/Lab 1	Con 2/Lab 1	Con 2/Lab 1	Lab 2/Con 1	Lab 3	Lab 3
Monkston	Lib 3	Lib 2/Con 1	Lib 2/Con 1	Lib 2/Con 1	Lib 3	Lib 3	Lib 3	Lib 3	Lib 3
Newport Pagnell North & Hanslope	Con 3	Con 3	Con 3	Con 3	Con 3	Con 3	Con 3	Con 3	Con 3
Newport Pagnell South	Lib 3	Lib 3	Lib 3	Lib 3	Lib 3	Lib 2/Con 1	Lib 2/Con 1	Lib 2/Con 1	Lib 2/Con 1
Olney	Con 3	Con 3	Con 3	Con 3	Con 3	Con 3	Con 3	Con 2/Lab 1	Con 2/Lab 1
Shenley Brook End	Lib 3	Lib 2/Con 1	Lib 2/Con 1	Lib 2/Con 1	Lib 2/Con 1	Con 2/Lib 1	Con 2/Lib 1	Lib 2/Con 1	Lib 3
Stantonbury	Lab 3	Lab 2/Con 1	Lab 2/Con 1	Lab 2/Con 1	Lab 2/Con 1	Con 2/Lab 1	Con 2/Lab 1	Lab 2/Con 1	Lab 3
Stony Stratford	Lab 2/Con 1	Lab 2/Con 1	Lab 2/Con 1	Lab 2/Con 1	Lab 3	Lab 2/Con 1	Lab 2/Con 1	Lab 2/Con 1	Lab 2/Con 1
Tattenhoe	Con 3	Con 3	Con 3	Con 2/Lab 1	Con 2/Lab 1	Con 2/Lab 1	Con 3	Con 3	Con 3
Wolverton	Lab 3	Lab 3	Lab 3	Lab 3	Lab 3	Lab 3	Lab 3	Lab 3	Lab 3
Woughton & Fishermead	Lab 3	Lab 3	Lab 3	Lab 3	Lab 3	Lab 3	Lab 3	Lab 3	Lab 3

==== 2026 onwards ====
In 2025, the boundaries were revised for subsequent electionns, so that there were 60 seats and each ward had three seats each except for two smaller wards (New Bradwell, 2 seats and Handlope, 1 seat). Elections were held for all seats in May 2026, before returning to the one-third model for subsequent years.

	2026
Bletchley Park & Fenny Stratford	Ref 3
Bletchley South	Lab 1/Ref 2
Bletchley West	Ref 3
Bradwell	LD 3
Broughton & Moulsoe	LD 3
Campbell Park & Willen	LD 3
Central Milton Keynes	Lab 3
Danesborough	Con 3
Furzton	LD 3
Great Linford	Lab 3
Hanslope	Con 1
New Bradwell	Lab 2
Newport Pagnell	LD 3
Olney & Rural	Con 3
Ouzel Valley	LD 3
Stony Stratford	Lab 3
Tattenhoe	Con 3
Walton	LD 2/Ref 1
Watling	Con 2/Lab 1
Wolverton	Lab 3
Woughton & Fishermead	Lab 3
TOTAL (60)	Con 12/Lab 19/ LD 20/Ref 9

== Borough result maps ==
2002 results map

2003 results map

2004 results map

2006 results map

2007 results map

2008 results map

2010 results map

2011 results map

2012 results map

2014 results map

2015 results map

2016 results map

2018 results map

2019 results map

2021 results map

2022 results map

2023 results map

2024 results map

2026 results map

== Frequency ==
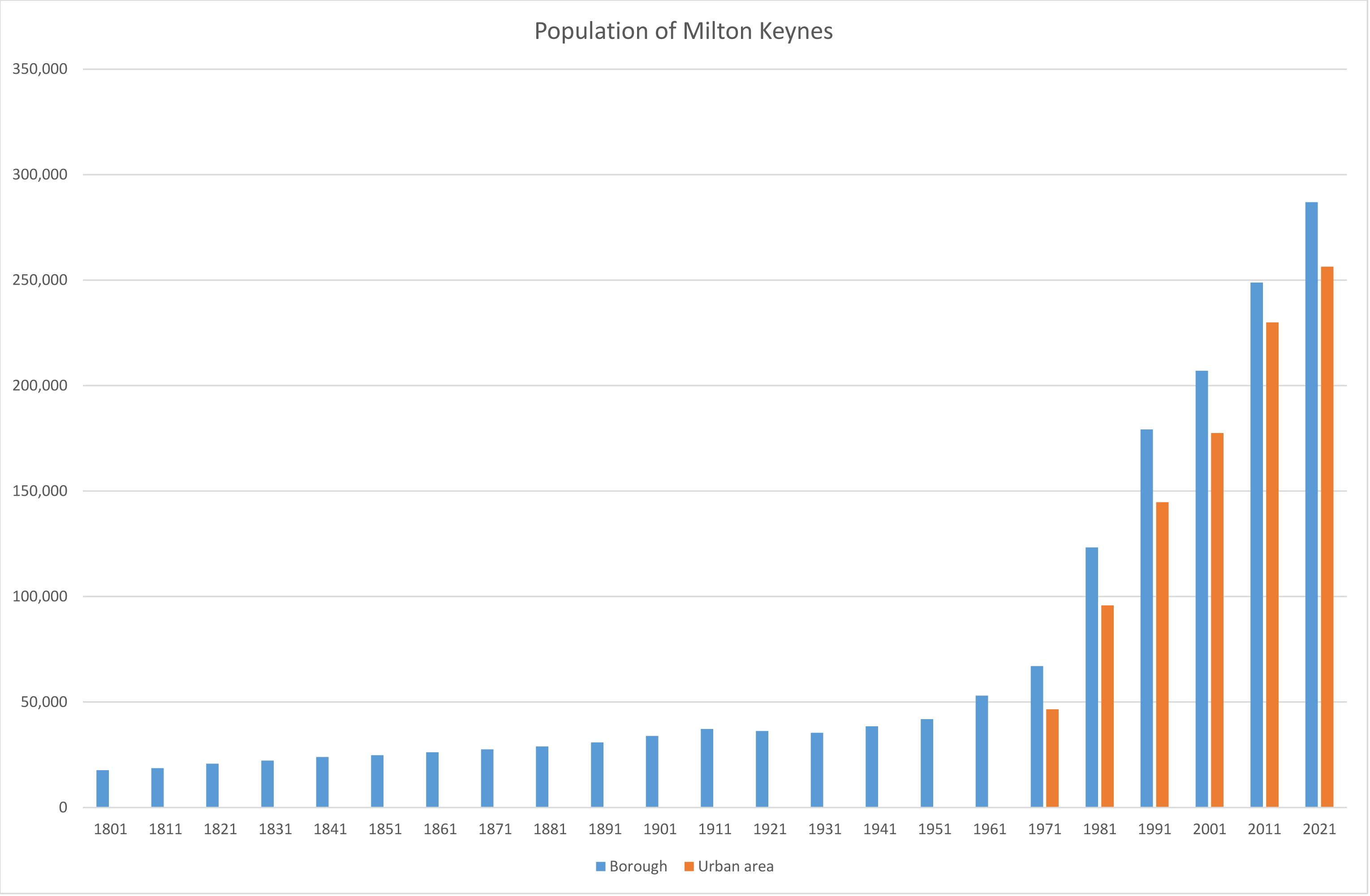
Population trend of borough and Urban Area 1801–2021

One third of the council is elected each year for 3 years, followed by one year without election, unless there is a substantial boundary change (when all seats are elected). Following an electoral review, changes to wards and an increase in the number of seats, 57 councillors were elected for all 19 wards from May 2014 onwards. After the previous reorganisation in 2002, 51 councillors were elected from 23 wards.

== Wards ==
=== 1973 ===
The first elections to the newly created Milton Keynes Borough Council took place on 7 June 1973. There were 40 seats up for election spread over 16 Wards. All councillors were elected for three years.

=== 1976 ===
In November 1975, the Boundary Commission proposed new ward boundaries. (These wards are generally larger than the civil parishes that give them their names. Some parishes are divided between wards. For details, see the Boundary Commission report.)

- Bletchley Central
- Danesborough
- Denbigh
- Eaton
- Loughton
- Newport Rural
- Newport Urban
- Newton
- Petsoe Manor
- Pineham
- Sherington
- Stantonbury
- Stony Stratford
- Watling
- Whaddon
- Wolverton

=== 1996 to 2000 ===
Between 1996 and 2000, there were 51 seats up for election. Boundary changes were made before the 2002 election but this did not affect the number of seats up for election.

=== 2002 to 2012 ===
Ward map 2010

From 2002 until the 2014 local elections, there were 23 wards in the Borough, which were represented by 51 councillors. The councillors corresponded to the wards in the following way:

- There were 8 wards that represented by 3 councillors. (Although many of the ward names are similar to civil parish names, their boundaries do necessarily not coincide.)
  - Bletchley & Fenny Stratford
  - Bradwell
  - Campbell Park
  - Emerson Valley
  - Loughton Park
  - Stony Stratford
  - Walton Park
  - Wolverton
- There were 12 wards that represented by 2 councillors:
  - Denbigh
  - Eaton Manor
  - Furzton]
  - Linford] North
  - Linford South
  - Middleton]]
  - Newport Pagnell North
  - Newport Pagnell South
  - Olney
  - Stantonbury
  - Whaddon
  - Woughton
- There were 3 wards that represented by 1 councillor:
  - Danesborough
  - Hanslope Park
  - Sherington

=== 2014 to 2025 ===
Ward map from May 2014

Following an electoral review and with effect from the 2014 Milton Keynes Council election in May 2014, there were 57 Councillors representing 19 wards, each with having 3 councillors. (Although many of the ward names are similar to civil parish names, their boundaries do necessarily not coincide.)

These wards are as follows:

- Bletchley East
- Bletchley Park
- Bletchley West
- Bradwell
- Broughton
- Campbell Park & Old Woughton
- Central Milton Keynes
- Danesborough & Walton
- Loughton & Shenley
- Monkston
- Newport Pagnell North & Hanslope
- Newport Pagnell South
- Olney
- Shenley Brook End
- Stantonbury
- Stony Stratford
- Tattenhoe
- Wolverton
- Woughton & Fishermead

=== 2026 onwards ===
Following an electoral review and with effect from the 2026 Milton Keynes Council election in May 2026, there were 60 Councillors representing 21 wards, with all but two with having three councillors. The exceptions are Hanslope (one) and New Bradwell (two). (Although many of the ward names are similar to civil parish names, their boundaries do necessarily not coincide.)

- Bletchley Park & Fenny Stratford
- Bletchley South
- Bletchley West
- Bradwell
- Broughton & Moulsoe
- Campbell Park & Willen
- Central Milton Keynes
- Danesborough
- Furzton
- Great Linford
- Hanslope
- New Bradwell
- Newport Pagnell
- Olney & Rural
- Ouzel Valley
- Stony Stratford
- Tattenhoe
- Walton
- Watling
- Wolverton
- Woughton & Fishermead

== By-elections ==
=== 2002-2006 ===
Whaddon By-Election 23 October 2003
Party	Candidate	Votes	%	±%
Labour		1,066	50.0	+5.5
Conservative		776	36.4	−2.5
Liberal Democrats		191	9.0	−7.7
UKIP		99	4.6	+4.6
Majority		290	13.6	
Turnout		2,132		
Labour hold		Swing		

=== 2006-2010 ===
Whaddon By-Election 28 June 2007
Party	Candidate	Votes	%	±%
Labour	Camilla Turnbull	1,108	43.8	+0.9
Conservative	Sam McCleod	914	36.1	−1.4
England First	Anna Seymour	221	8.7	+8.7
Liberal Democrats	Alfred Vella	129	5.1	−3.3
UKIP	Micheal Maylam	109	4.3	−3.4
Independent	Sam Browne	49	1.9	+1.9
Majority		194	7.7	
Turnout		2,530		
Labour hold		Swing		

=== 2010-2014 ===
Bletchley and Fenny Stratford By-Election 20 June 2013
Party	Candidate	Votes	%	±%
Labour	Mohammed Khan	1,356	39.9	+3.1
UKIP	Vince Peddle	855	25.2	+14.3
Conservative	John Bailey	779	22.9	−12.6
Green	Keith Allen	277	8.2	−4.0
Liberal Democrats	Rosemary Snell	128	3.8	−0.9
Majority		501	14.8	
Turnout		3,395		
Labour hold		Swing		

=== 2014-2018 ===
Newport Pagnell North and Hanslope By-Election 18 January 2018
Party	Candidate	Votes	%	±%
Conservative	Bill Green	1,604	53.0	+5.2
Labour	Nick Phillips	749	24.8	+4.0
Liberal Democrats	Jane Carr	672	22.2	+3.6
Majority		855	28.3	
Turnout		3,025		
Conservative hold		Swing		

=== 2018-2022 ===
Bletchley East By-Election 19 July 2018
Party	Candidate	Votes	%	±%
Labour	Emily Darlington	1,355	50.9	+3.1
Conservative	Angela Kennedy	1,026	38.5	−0.7
Green	Jo Breen	131	4.9	−3.1
UKIP	Vince Peddle	101	3.8	+3.8
Liberal Democrats	Richard Greenwood	50	1.9	−3.1
Majority		329	12.4	
Turnout		2,663		
Labour hold		Swing		

=== 2022-2026 ===
Woughton and Fishermead By-Election 7 July 2022
Party	Candidate	Votes	%	±%
Labour	Susan Smith	1,355	73.3	+3.4
Conservative	Rafal Brewczynski	340	18.4	−1.8
Liberal Democrats	Raissa Roy	154	8.3	−1.6
Majority		1,015	54.9	
Turnout		1,849		
Labour hold		Swing		

Newport Pagnell South By-Election 21 September 2023
Party	Candidate	Votes	%	±%
Liberal Democrats	Tony Oyakhire	1,088	43.5	−2.6
Labour	Saskia Soden	684	27.4	+11.5
Conservative	Ade Adeliyi	561	22.4	−11.9
Green	Gary Lloyd	80	3.2	+3.2
Independent	Lynn Cocksedge	53	2.1	+2.1
Women's Equality	Jane Whild	34	1.4	+1.4
Majority		404	16.2	
Turnout		2,500		
Liberal Democrats gain from Conservative		Swing		

Loughton and Shenley By-Election 22 February 2024
Party	Candidate	Votes	%	±%
Labour	Leo Montague	1,136	46.2	−2.3
Conservative	Rajeev Sharma	971	39.5	+0.9
Liberal Democrats	Garrath Green	179	7.3	−0.4
Green	Timothy Lee	113	4.6	−0.6
Independent	Ray Brady	61	2.5	+2.5
Majority		165	6.7	
Turnout		2,460		
Labour hold		Swing		

Bletchley East By-Election 12 September 2024
Party	Candidate	Votes	%	±%
Labour	Saskia Soden	869	49.7	−4.9
Conservative	James Marlow	431	24.7	+4.3
Independent	Ray Brady	147	8.4	+8.4
Green	Joe French	143	8.2	+0.5
Liberal Democrats	Sean McCabe	127	7.3	+1.7
Heritage	Alfred Saint-Clair	30	1.7	+1.7
Majority		438	25.1	
Turnout		1,747		
Labour hold		Swing		

Bradwell By-Election 14 November 2024
Party	Candidate	Votes	%	±%
Liberal Democrats	Kerrie Bradburn	1,128	56.1	+2.6
Labour	Christian Durugo	329	16.3	−8.4
Reform	Chrissy Dingsdale	228	11.3	+11.3
Conservative	Krishna Murthy Panthula	226	11.2	−2.5
Green	Alan Francis	101	5.0	−2.4
Majority		800	39.8	+11.0
Turnout		2,013	20.5	−9.6
Liberal Democrats hold		Swing		

Changes with when seat was last contested on 2 May 2024.

Broughton By-Election 14 November 2024
Party	Candidate	Votes	%	±%
Liberal Democrats	Clare Hannah Tevlin	1,169	51.5	+5.8
Conservative	Rishi Sharda	541	23.8	−2.1
Labour	Ellis Archer	360	15.9	−5.3
Green	Gary Nicholas Lloyd	138	6.1	+1.3
Heritage	Alfred Saint-Clair	61	2.7	0.9
Majority		628	27.7	+7.9
Turnout		2,269	15.9	−10.9
Liberal Democrats hold		Swing		

Changes with when seat was last contested on 2 May 2024.

=== 2026 to present ===
New Bradwell By-Election 24 September 2026
Party	Candidate	Votes	%	±%
Labour	Tracey Bailey	1,023	54.2	+19.4
Reform	Julian Vernon Camies	441	23.4	−4.0
Green	Alan Francis	175	9.3	−10.8
Conservative	Gabriel Ferreira da Costa	160	8.5	−2.9
Liberal Democrats	Martin Kenneth Clarke	87	4.6	−1.7
Majority		582	30.8	
Turnout		1,891	25.9	
Labour hold		Swing		
