= 2024 Milton Keynes City Council election =

Local election in Milton Keynes, England

← 2023	2 May 2024	2026 →

19 out of 57 seats to Milton Keynes City Council 29 seats needed for a majority
- Turnout: 30.3%

	Majority party	Minority party	Third party
Leader	Peter Marland	Robin Bradburn	David Hopkins
Party	Labour	Liberal Democrats	Conservative
Leader's seat	Wolverton	Bradwell	Danesborough & Walton
Seats before	27	16	14
Seats won	9	6	4
Seats after	30	18	9
Seat change	▲3	▲2	▼5
Percentage	38.3%	19.0%	32.4%
Swing	▲4.3%	▲2.8%	▼9.6%
- Winner of each seat at the 2024 Milton Keynes City Council election
Leader before election
Peter Marland
Labour
No overall control
Leader after election
Peter Marland
Labour

The 2024 Milton Keynes City Council elections were held on Thursday 2 May 2024, alongside the other local elections in the United Kingdom that were held on the same day. One-third of the 57 members of Milton Keynes City Council in Buckinghamshire were up for election.

Prior to the election, the council was under no overall control, being run by a Labour and Liberal Democrat coalition, led by Peter Marland of the Labour Party. The election saw Labour win an overall majority of the seats on the council for the first time since the 1999 elections.

== Background ==
Milton Keynes was created as a unitary authority in 1997. Labour controlled the council from its creation until 2000, with the Liberal Democrats winning the council from no overall control in 2002. The Liberal Democrats lost their majority in 2006, and no party has formed a majority since.

The Conservatives became the largest party on the council in 2011, but were overtaken by Labour in 2014. The Conservatives were again the largest group in 2018, with Labour overtaking them in 2019. The Conservatives formed the largest group from 2021 to 2023; in that election, Labour gained 5 seats to become the largest group on the council, the Conservatives lost 6, and the Liberal Democrats gained 1. Labour and the Liberal Democrats formed a majority coalition following the election.

The seats up for election in 2024 were last contested in 2021; because of the delay of all local elections due to the COVID-19 pandemic, the seats are up for election after 3 years rather than the usual 4. In that election, the Conservatives won 11 seats (up 6) with 42.0% of the vote, Labour won 7 (down 4) with 34.0%, and the Liberal Democrats won 3 (down 2) with 16.2%.

== Previous council composition ==
After 2023 election		Before 2024 election		After 2024 election	
Party	Seats	Party	Seats	Party	Seats
Labour	25	Labour	27	Labour	30
Liberal Democrats	15	Liberal Democrats	16	Liberal Democrats	18
Conservative	17	Conservative	14	Conservative	9

Changes 2023–2024:

- June 2023: Joe Hearnshaw and James Lancaster join Labour from Conservatives
- August 2023: Scot Balazs (Conservative) resigns; by-election held September 2023
- September 2023: Tony Oyakhire (Liberal Democrats) wins by-election from Conservatives
- January 2024: Brigid McBride (Labour) resigns; by-election held February 2024
- February 2024: Leo Montague (Labour) wins by-election

== Election results ==
2024 Milton Keynes City Council election
Party	This election			Full council			This election		
Party	Seats	Net	Seats %	Other	Total	Total %	Votes	Votes %	+/−
Labour	9	▲3	47.4	21	30	50.8	23,608	38.3	+0.1
Liberal Democrats	6	▲2	31.6	12	18	30.5	11,721	19.0	-2.6
Conservative	4	▼5	21.1	5	9	15.8	19,962	32.4	-0.3
Green	0	Steady	0.0	0	0	0.0	4,900	7.9	+2.3
Independent	0	Steady	0.0	0	0	0.0	577	0.9	New
Reform	0	Steady	0.0	0	0	0.0	422	0.7	-0.8
Heritage	0	Steady	0.0	0	0	0.0	64	0.1	±0.0

== Ward results ==
An asterisk indicates an incumbent.

=== Bletchley East ===
Bletchley East
Party	Candidate	Votes	%	±%
Labour Co-op	Ed Hume*	1,614	54.6	−2.2
Conservative	James Marlow	604	20.4	−5.0
Independent	Ron Haine	316	10.7	N/A
Green	Axel Hans Segebrecht	228	7.7	+2.1
Liberal Democrats	Sean Douglas McCabe	166	5.6	−1.2
Rejected ballots		27	0.9	
Turnout		2955	22.79	
Registered electors		12,968		
Labour Co-op hold		Swing		

=== Bletchley Park ===
Bletchley Park
Party	Candidate	Votes	%	±%
Labour	Ayesha Khanom	1,532	45.4	+3.9
Conservative	Mo Imran*	1171	34.7	−4.8
Green	Michael John Sheppard	337	10.0	+1.8
Liberal Democrats	Timothy Iain Gomm	297	8.8	+2.1
Rejected ballots		36	1.1	
Turnout		3373	30.40	
Registered electors		11,094		
Labour gain from Conservative		Swing		

=== Bletchley West ===
Bletchley West
Party	Candidate	Votes	%	±%
Labour	Hannah O`Neill	1,492	48.4	+4.4
Conservative	Adam Rolfe*	1,129	36.7	−0.9
Green	Marcello Bianco	232	7.5	+1.3
Liberal Democrats	Benjamin John Edwards	195	6.3	−0.5
Rejected ballots		32	1.0	
Turnout		3080	30.41	
Registered electors		10,129		
Labour gain from Conservative		Swing		

=== Bradwell ===
Bradwell
Party	Candidate	Votes	%	±%
Liberal Democrats	Marie Bradburn*	1,532	53.5	−3.8
Labour	Mustapha Zamaan	709	24.7	−1.5
Conservative	Krishna Panthula	392	13.7	−1.8
Green	Lucy Rebecca Bjorck	213	7.4	N/A
Rejected ballots		19	0.7	
Turnout		2865	30.07	
Registered electors		9,527		
Liberal Democrats hold		Swing		

=== Broughton ===
Broughton
Party	Candidate	Votes	%	±%
Liberal Democrats	Uroy Clarke*	1,652	45.7	−13.1
Conservative	Rishi Sharda	938	25.9	+2.9
Labour	George Baldock	767	21.2	+5.4
Green	James Richard Hadfield	174	4.8	N/A
Heritage	Alfred Saint-Clair	64	1.8	−0.6
Rejected ballots		22	0.6	
Turnout		3617	26.78	
Registered electors		13,506		
Liberal Democrats hold		Swing		

=== Campbell Park & Old Woughton ===
Campbell Park & Old Woughton
Party	Candidate	Votes	%	±%
Liberal Democrats	Graham Eaton	1,263	36.8	−11.2
Conservative	Charlotte Hall*	1,107	32.2	+3.0
Labour	Matt Curtis	835	24.3	+6.9
Green	Carol Barac	209	6.1	+0.6
Rejected ballots		21	0.6	
Turnout		3435	34.68	
Registered electors		9,905		
Liberal Democrats gain from Conservative		Swing		

=== Central Milton Keynes ===
Central Milton Keynes
Party	Candidate	Votes	%	±%
Labour	Martin Ronald Petchey	1,383	53.5	+7.5
Conservative	Brian Thomas Hingley	664	25.7	+0.6
Liberal Democrats	Russell Frederick Houchin	293	11.3	−2.5
Green	Joe French	224	8.7	−2.1
Rejected ballots		23	0.9	
Turnout		2587	23.67	
Registered electors		10,930		
Labour hold		Swing		

=== Danesborough & Walton ===
Danesborough & Walton
Party	Candidate	Votes	%	±%
Conservative	Victoria Hopkins*	1,990	46.8	+9.9
Labour	Rukhsana Malik	1525	35.9	−5.2
Green	Peter William Skelton	423	10.0	−0.4
Liberal Democrats	Edis Bevan	272	6.4	−0.7
Rejected ballots		38	0.9	
Turnout		4248	33.34	
Registered electors		12,743		
Conservative hold		Swing		

=== Loughton & Shenley ===
Loughton & Shenley
Party	Candidate	Votes	%	±%
Labour	Mandy Legg	1,457	44.6	−3.9
Conservative	Rajeev Sharma	1214	37.2	−1.4
Liberal Democrats	Garrath Green	251	7.7	±0.0
Green	Timothy Lee	174	5.3	+0.1
Independent	Ray Brady	152	4.7	N/A
Rejected ballots		17	0.5	
Turnout		3265	32.74	
Registered electors		9,972		
Labour hold		Swing		

=== Monkston ===
Monkston
Party	Candidate	Votes	%	±%
Liberal Democrats	Duncan Banks	1,118	43.8	−7.8
Labour	Monica Stella Dowling	623	24.4	+5.3
Conservative	Devin Hindry	500	19.6	−2.6
Green	Vanessa Skelton	185	7.2	+0.1
Independent	Taimyr Pouaty	109	4.3	N/A
Rejected ballots		20	0.8	
Turnout		2555	27.82	
Registered electors		9,184		
Liberal Democrats hold		Swing		

=== Newport Pagnell North & Hanslope ===
Newport Pagnell North & Hanslope
Party	Candidate	Votes	%	±%
Conservative	Chris Wardle*	1,672	47.9	+3.4
Liberal Democrats	Scott Humphries	796	22.8	−9.0
Labour	Carol Wood	776	22.2	+2.0
Green	Jason Scott Down	220	6.3	N/A
Rejected ballots		27	0.8	
Turnout		3491	34.58	
Registered electors		10,096		
Conservative hold		Swing		

=== Newport Pagnell South ===
Newport Pagnell South
Party	Candidate	Votes	%	±%
Liberal Democrats	Tony Oyakhire*	1,263	45.9	−0.2
Conservative	Jamie Lee Rossiter	685	24.9	−9.4
Labour	Saskia Soden	621	22.6	+6.7
Green	Conner Hughes	162	5.9	N/A
Rejected ballots		21	0.8	
Turnout		2752	31.16	
Registered electors		8,833		
Liberal Democrats hold		Swing		

=== Olney ===
Olney
Party	Candidate	Votes	%	±%
Conservative	Keith McLean*	2,234	52.5	+8.7
Labour	Dan Rowland	1505	35.4	−9.4
Green	Catherine Jean Rose	387	9.1	+3.5
Liberal Democrats	Rebecca Ann Cave	110	2.6	−0.5
Rejected ballots		20	0.5	
Turnout		4256	42.43	
Registered electors		10,030		
Conservative hold		Swing		

=== Shenley Brook End ===
Shenley Brook End
Party	Candidate	Votes	%	±%
Liberal Democrats	Saleena Raja	1,379	42.9	+4.2
Conservative	Ketan Kadakia	1013	31.5	−7.1
Labour	Mike Kasibo	611	19.0	+1.7
Green	Dominic John Malcolm Taylor	185	5.8	+0.4
Rejected ballots		24	0.7	
Turnout		3212	34.07	
Registered electors		9,428		
Liberal Democrats gain from Conservative		Swing		

=== Stantonbury ===
Stantonbury
Party	Candidate	Votes	%	±%
Labour	Victoria Bamisile	1,652	49.2	−1.1
Conservative	Amanda Marlow	706	21.0	−11.0
Reform	Sean Porter	422	12.6	N/A
Green	Gary Nicholas Lloyd	304	9.0	+0.1
Liberal Democrats	Greg Duffield	255	7.6	−0.5
Rejected ballots		21	0.6	
Turnout		3360	30.30	
Registered electors		11,090		
Labour gain from Conservative		Swing		

=== Stony Stratford ===
Stony Stratford
Party	Candidate	Votes	%	±%
Labour	Joe Hearnshaw*	2,077	50.5	+4.3
Conservative	Denise Brunning	1,389	33.8	−3.0
Liberal Democrats	Richard Michael Greenwood	323	7.9	−2.1
Green	Joan Christine Hughes	293	7.1	+0.2
Rejected ballots		30	0.7	
Turnout		4112	33.09	
Registered electors		12,428		
Labour hold		Swing		

=== Tattenhoe ===
Tattenhoe
Party	Candidate	Votes	%	±%
Conservative	Manish Verma*	1,566	48.6	+2.9
Labour	Christian Durugo	1260	39.1	−1.5
Green	Geoffrey Travis Waggott	218	6.8	−0.2
Liberal Democrats	Dominic Dyer	157	4.9	+0.2
Rejected ballots		18	0.6	
Turnout		3219	35.06	
Registered electors		9,182		
Conservative hold		Swing		

=== Wolverton ===
Wolverton
Party	Candidate	Votes	%	±%
Labour	Ansar Hussain*	1,748	56.9	−5.3
Conservative	Edith Bald	541	17.6	−1.8
Green	Alan Herbert Francis	515	16.8	+5.0
Liberal Democrats	Rachel Chanalaris	251	8.2	+1.6
Rejected ballots		18	0.6	
Turnout		3073	28.31	
Registered electors		10,855		
Labour hold		Swing		

=== Woughton & Fishermead ===
Woughton & Fishermead
Party	Candidate	Votes	%	±%
Labour	Donna Juli Fuller*	1,421	63.2	−2.1
Conservative	David George Caraivan	447	19.9	+1.9
Green	Tony Coughlan	217	9.7	+1.8
Liberal Democrats	Caroline Picking	148	6.6	−2.2
Rejected ballots		15	0.7	
Turnout		2248	19.20	
Registered electors		11,710		
Labour hold		Swing		

== Changes 2024-2026 ==
=== By-elections ===
==== Bradwell ====
Bradwell by-election: 14 November 2024
Party	Candidate	Votes	%	±%
Liberal Democrats	Kerrie Bradburn	1,129	56.1	+2.3
Labour	Christian Durugo	329	16.3	–8.6
Reform	Chrissy Dingsdale	228	11.3	N/A
Conservative	Krishna Panthula	226	11.2	–2.6
Green	Alan Francis	101	5.0	–2.5
Majority		800	39.8	+11.0
Turnout		2,013	20.5	–9.6
Registered electors		9,813		
Liberal Democrats hold		Swing	▲5.5	

==== Broughton ====
Broughton by-election: 14 November 2024
Party	Candidate	Votes	%	±%
Liberal Democrats	Clare Tevlin	1,169	51.5	+5.8
Conservative	Risha Sharda	541	23.8	–2.1
Labour	Ellis Archer	360	15.9	–5.3
Green	Gary Lloyd	138	6.1	+1.3
Heritage	Alfred Saint-Clair	61	2.7	+0.9
Majority		628	27.7	+7.9
Turnout		2,274	16.0	–10.8
Registered electors		14,254		
Liberal Democrats hold		Swing	▲4.0	
