= 2012 Milton Keynes Council election =

2012 UK local government election

The 2012 Milton Keynes Council election took place on Thursday 3 May 2012 to elect members of Milton Keynes Unitary Council in Buckinghamshire, England. One third of the council – the 17 seats contested in the 2008 election – was up for election and the council, which totals 51 seats, was under no overall control in advance of and after the vote. 7 of the Conservative Party's 21 seats were up for election, 4 of the Liberal Democrats's 17, 2 of the Labour's 9 and all 4 Independents.

After the election, the composition of the council was:

- Conservative 20 (–1)
- Labour 16 (+7)
- Liberal Democrat 15 (–2)
- Others 0 (–4)

One Liberal Democrat had become independent between the 2011 and 2012 elections.

== Election results ==
Milton Keynes Council Election 2012
Party	Seats	Gains	Losses	Net gain/loss	Seats %	Votes %	Votes	+/−
Labour	9	7	0	+7	58.8	34.2	14,707	+6.7
Conservative	6	2	3	-1	35.3	30.2	12,959	-7.0
Liberal Democrats	2	0	2	-2	11.8	19.8	8,503	-4.7
UKIP	0	0	0	0	0.0	7.2	3,089	+1.4
Green	0	0	0	0	0.0	6.4	2,741	+1.4
Independent	0	0	4	-4	0.0	2.3	975	+2.2

== Ward results ==
Bletchley and Fenny Stratford
Party	Candidate	Votes	%	±%
Labour	Rita Venn	1,270	36.6	+5.3
Conservative	John Bailey	1,223	35.2	−15.5
Green	Paul Bowler	420	12.1	+12.1
UKIP	Adrian Pitfield	375	10.8	+1.3
Liberal Democrats	Susan Burke	161	4.6	−3.9
Labour gain from Conservative		Swing	+10.4	

Bradwell
Party	Candidate	Votes	%	±%
Labour	Pauline Wallis	1,015	38.7	+13.4
Liberal Democrats	Patrick Mcquillan	808	30.8	−16.1
Independent	Phillip Gerrella	426	16.2	+16.2
Conservative	Shouket Mirza	356	13.6	−14.2
Labour gain from Independent		Swing		

Campbell Park
Party	Candidate	Votes	%	±%
Labour	Paul Williams	1,187	41.8	+11.1
Liberal Democrats	Darron Kendrick	976	34.3	−8.9
Conservative	Reginald Chopra	444	15.6	−10.5
Independent	Isabella Fraser	221	7.8	+7.8
Labour gain from Independent		Swing		

Denbigh
Party	Candidate	Votes	%	±%
Labour	Michael Legg	965	50.7	−1.3
Green	Elizabeth Campbell	420	22.1	+22.1
Conservative	Margaret Geaney	323	16.7	−16.5
UKIP	Steven Beaumont	153	8	+0.2
Liberal Democrats	Edis Bevan	32	1.7	−5.3
Labour gain from Green		Swing		

Eaton Manor
Party	Candidate	Votes	%	±%
Labour	Alan Webb	832	53.4	+12.3
Conservative	Kevin Geaney	294	18.9	−8.8
UKIP	Arnold Leeming	239	15.3	+8
Liberal Democrats	Alfred Vella	79	5.1	−2.5
Labour hold		Swing		

Emerson Valley
Party	Candidate	Votes	%	±%
Conservative	Gerald Small	1,136	34.5	−18.3
Liberal Democrats	Sean Barnes	991	30.1	−6.1
Labour	Mohammed Khan	749	22.7	+11.7
UKIP	Joseph Pinto	268	8.1	+8.1
Green	Philip Buckley	142	4.3	+4.3
Conservative hold		Swing		

Loughton Park
Party	Candidate	Votes	%	±%
Conservative	Donald Hoyle	1,314	43.2	−15.5
Labour	Peter Todd	1144	37.6	+15.1
Green	Michael Lovell	318	10.4	+10.4
Liberal Democrats	Christopher Thompson	252	8.3	−2.9
Conservative hold		Swing		

Middleton
Party	Candidate	Votes	%	±%
Conservative	Peter McDonald	1,139	38	−5.6
Liberal Democrats	Samuel Crooks	1,135	37.8	−9.9
Labour	Rachael Martin-Smith	465	15.5	+9.7
Green	Katrina Creaser	153	5.1	+2.2
UKIP	Roger Nye	108	3.6	+3.6
Conservative gain from Liberal Democrats		Swing	+10	

Newport Pagnell North
Party	Candidate	Votes	%	±%
Liberal Democrats	Paul Alexander	802	45	−18
Independent	Mike Barry	328	18.4	+18.4
Conservative	James Orr	257	14.4	−14.2
Labour	Alan Price	219	12.3	+3.8
UKIP	Marc O'Brien	96	5.4	+5.4
Green	Graham Findlay	72	4	+4
Liberal Democrats hold		Swing		

Newport Pagnell South
Party	Candidate	Votes	%	±%
Liberal Democrats	Douglas McCall	968	55.2	−2.7
Conservative	Richard Abery	421	24	−9.5
Labour	Martin Petchey	212	12.1	+3.5
UKIP	Robert Dunckley	152	8.7	+8.7
Liberal Democrats hold		Swing		

Olney
Party	Candidate	Votes	%	±%
Conservative	Peter Geary	1,473	62.2	+8.8
Labour	David Jones	421	17.8	+14.7
UKIP	Judith Green	242	10.2	+10.2
Liberal Democrats	Alice Tootill	223	9.4	−28.3
Conservative hold		Swing		

Stantonbury
Party	Candidate	Votes	%	±%
Labour	Margaret Burke	935	44.5	+20.3
Conservative	Barbara Wright	707	33.6	−1.1
UKIP	Helen Davies	217	10.3	+2.5
Liberal Democrats	Thomas Mallyon	129	6.1	−23.7
Green	Thomas Bulman	112	5.3	+5.3
Labour gain from Conservative		Swing		

Stony Stratford
Party	Candidate	Votes	%	±%
Conservative	Denise Brunning	1,225	41.6	−2.5
Labour	Arshad Majid	919	31.2	+8.2
UKIP	David Tavener	332	11.3	+7.5
Green	Michael Sheppard	251	8.5	+8.5
Liberal Democrats	Tahl Macnair-Kay	204	6.9	−0.7
Conservative hold		Swing		

Walton Park
Party	Candidate	Votes	%	±%
Conservative	Alice Bramall	1,390	43.4	+0.2
Liberal Democrats	Vanessa McPake	978	30.5	−16
Labour	Suzanne Nti	528	16.5	+6.1
UKIP	Sandra Lindley	153	4.8	+4.8
Green	Francesca Hill	131	4.1	+4.1
Conservative gain from Liberal Democrats		Swing		

Whaddon
Party	Candidate	Votes	%	±%
Labour	Elaine Wales	934	42	−0.2
Conservative	Uroy Clarke	642	28.9	−15.5
UKIP	Stuart Moore	281	12.6	+4.4
Green	Antony Mabbott	259	11.6	+11.6
Liberal Democrats	Rosemary Snell	96	3.5	+4.3
Labour gain from Conservative		Swing		

Wolverton
Party	Candidate	Votes	%	±%
Labour	Robert Middleton	1,639	51.5	+19
Liberal Democrats	Mike Galloway	618	19.4	−17.1
Conservative	Richard Gates	353	11.1	−6.2
UKIP	Ronen Ghose	284	8.9	+3
Green	Alan Francis	265	8.3	+0.6
Labour gain from Liberal Democrats		Swing		

Woughton
Party	Candidate	Votes	%	±%
Labour	Hannah O'Neill	1,273	68	+14.3
Conservative	Lorraine Brusby	262	14	−11.1
UKIP	Michael Kearney	189	10.1	−0.2
Green	John Creaser	92	4.9	+4.9
Liberal Democrats	Ozoyah Oyakhire	51	2.7	−8.2
Labour hold		Swing		
