= 2016 Milton Keynes Council election =

2016 UK local government election

← 2015	5 May 2016	2018 →

20 of the 57 seats to Milton Keynes Council 29 seats needed for a majority
- Turnout: 33.66% (▼30.59%)
	First party	Second party	Third party
Leader	Peter Marland	Edith Bald	Douglas McCall
Party	Labour	Conservative	Liberal Democrats
Leader's seat	Wolverton	Tattenhoe	Newport Pagnell South
Seats before	23	22	12
Seats won	22	22	13
Seat change	▼1	0	▲1
Popular vote	22,860	21,711	12,249
Percentage	36.25%	34.43%	19.42%
Swing	▲8.31%	▼4.52%	▲4.91%
	Fourth party	Fifth party	Sixth party
Leader	Vince Peddle	?	Darron James Kenrick
Party	UKIP	Green	Independent
Leader's seat	Bletchley West (Unelected)	? (Unelected)	Central Milton Keynes (Unelected)
Seats before	0	0	0
Seats won	0	0	0
Seat change	0	0	0
Popular vote	5,060	911	191
Percentage	8.02%	1.57%	0.30%
Swing	▼3.55%	▼5.11%	▲0.14%
Council control before election
No Overall Majority
Council control after election
No Overall Majority

The 2016 Milton Keynes Council election took place on 5 May 2016 to elect members of Milton Keynes Council in England. This was on the same day as other local elections.

== Ward results ==
Two Councillors elected

Two Councillors were elected in the Bletchley East ward seat meaning each party was allowed to contest the seat with two candidates of their choice.

Bletchley East
Party	Candidate	Votes	%	±%
Labour	Martin Gowans	1,434	47.2	4.3
Labour	Alan Webb	1,088		
UKIP	Ronald Haine	972	18.2	−6.8
Conservative	Angela Kennedy	872	28.6	17
Conservative	David Priest	659		
Liberal Democrats	Ian Nuttall	190	6	0.7
Liberal Democrats	Masood Jehangir	130		
Turnout		3,035	30.05	
Labour hold		Swing		

One Councillor elected

Only one candidate from each party could contest each seat.

Bletchley Park
Party	Candidate	Votes	%	±%
Labour	Elaine Wales	1,564	40.4	6.4
Conservative	Kevin Geaney	1,369	35.3	7.6
UKIP	Adrian Pitfield	710	18.3	−8
Liberal Democrats	Matthew Drewett	232	6	2.8
Majority		195	5.1	
Turnout		3,920	35.92	
Labour hold		Swing		

Bletchley West
Party	Candidate	Votes	%	±%
Labour	Nigel Long	1,677	44.6	7
Conservative	Gina Bariah	1,233	32.8	11.9
UKIP	Vince Peddle	647	17.2	−11
Liberal Democrats	Colin Howarth	205	5.5	0.4
Majority		444	11.8	
Turnout		3,785	35.68	
Labour hold		Swing		

Bradwell
Party	Candidate	Votes	%	±%
Liberal Democrats	Marie Bradburn	1,852	50.4	16.8
Labour	David Lewis	1,362	37.1	4.5
Conservative	Max Chaudhry	462	12.6	−3.7
Majority		490	13.3	
Turnout		3,707	39.35	
Liberal Democrats gain from Labour		Swing		

Broughton
Party	Candidate	Votes	%	±%
Conservative	John Bint	1,208	46.3	6.1
Liberal Democrats	Kerrie Bradburn	1,003	38.5	−0.9
Labour	Binta Bah-Pokawa	397	15.2	0.7
Majority		205	7.8	
Turnout		2,624	28.27	
Conservative hold		Swing		

Campbell Park and Old Woughton
Party	Candidate	Votes	%	±%
Liberal Democrats	Ric Brackenbury	1,557	41.8	8.2
Conservative	James Orr	1,163	31.2	2.9
Labour	Yahya Wiseman	747	20	0.2
UKIP	Bill Smith	260	7	−7.8
Majority		394	10.6	
Turnout		3,750	39.25	
Liberal Democrats hold		Swing		

Central Milton Keynes
Party	Candidate	Votes	%	±%
Labour	Pauline Wallis	1,327	53.4	10.5
Conservative	Terry Baines	680	27.4	6.6
Liberal Democrats	Ian Morrall	286	11.5	−3.5
Independent	Darron Kendrick	191	7.7	7.7
Majority		647	26	
Turnout		2,507	26.93	
Labour hold		Swing		

Danesborough and Walton
Party	Candidate	Votes	%	±%
Conservative	Victoria Hopkins	1,832	63.4	11.2
Labour	Tate Ballard	686	23.8	4.1
Liberal Democrats	Richard Greenwood	370	12.8	2.7
Majority		1,146	39.6	
Turnout		2,919	32.68	
Conservative hold		Swing		

Loughton and Shenley (3)
Party	Candidate	Votes	%	±%
Labour	Zoe Nolan	1,994	51.8	16
Conservative	John Howe	1,618	42	5.6
Liberal Democrats	Russell Houchin	448	6.2	0.2
Majority		376	9.8	
Turnout		3,890	39	
Labour hold		Swing		

Monkston
Party	Candidate	Votes	%	±%
Liberal Democrats	Vanessa McPake	1,337	47.9	4.9
Conservative	Vicki McLean	907	32.5	4.1
Labour	Vikas Chandra	545	19.5	−0.6
Majority		430	15.4	
Turnout		2,811	31.49	
Liberal Democrats hold		Swing		

Newport Pagnell North and Hanslope
Party	Candidate	Votes	%	±%
Conservative	Jeannette Green	1,605	47.8	0.3
Labour	Ernie Butler	698	20.8	4.8
Liberal Democrats	Leo Montague	623	18.6	−2
UKIP	Brian Monro	432	12.9	1.6
Majority		907	27	
Turnout		3,383	35.05	
Conservative hold		Swing		

Newport Pagnell South
Party	Candidate	Votes	%	±%
Liberal Democrats	Douglas McCall	1,766	54.4	7.4
Conservative	William Davies	645	19.9	−1.2
Labour	Paul Day	502	15.5	5.7
UKIP	Nigel Birrell	331	10.2	−7.9
Majority		1,121	34.5	
Turnout		3,261	36.08	
Liberal Democrats hold		Swing		

Olney
Party	Candidate	Votes	%	±%
Conservative	Donald McLean	2,109	57.5	2.7
Labour	Dee Bethune	835	22.8	6.6
UKIP	Dana Green	368	10	−8.3
Liberal Democrats	Tony Oyakhire	184	5	−5.6
Green	Catherine Rose	171	4.7	4.7
Majority		1,274	34.7	
Turnout		3,687	38.83	
Conservative hold		Swing		

Shenley Brook End
Party	Candidate	Votes	%	±%
Liberal Democrats	Peter Cannon	1,055	35.4	−1.9
Conservative	Jenny Richards	953	32	8.5
Labour	Rachel Pallett	683	22.9	4.1
UKIP	Geoffrey Winter	287	9.6	−8
Majority		102	3.4	
Turnout		2,993	31.75	
Liberal Democrats hold		Swing		

Stantonbury
Party	Candidate	Votes	%	±%
Labour	Martin Petchey	1,513	41.6	5.7
Conservative	Michael Somerton	1,323	36.4	12.3
Liberal Democrats	Bob Benning	428	11.8	1.5
Green	Alexander Fraser	373	10.3	5.6
Majority		190	5.2	
Turnout		3,671	33.82	
Labour hold		Swing		

Stony Stratford
Party	Candidate	Votes	%	±%
Labour	Charlie Wilson	1,376	42.9	1.8
Conservative	Simon Hawton	1,150	35.9	−3.7
UKIP	David Tavener	390	12.2	2.9
Liberal Democrats	Kathleen Greenwood	290	9.1	4.3
Majority		226	7	
Turnout		3,230	41.97	
Labour hold		Swing		

Tattenhoe
Party	Candidate	Votes	%	±%
Conservative	Gerald Small	939	47.5	8.8
Labour	Anthony Brown	720	36.4	10.2
UKIP	Leslie Ive	175	8.9	−10.4
Liberal Democrats	Jane Carr	143	7.2	−5.2
Majority		219	11.1	
Turnout		1,991	25.73	
Conservative hold		Swing		

Wolverton
Party	Candidate	Votes	%	±%
Labour	Norman Miles	1,851	58.6	15.2
Conservative	Shouket Mirza	616	19.5	−2
Green	Jennifer Marklew	447	14.2	2.7
Liberal Democrats	Chris Thompson	243	7.7	0.8
Majority		1,235	39.1	
Turnout		3,192	30.45	
Labour hold		Swing		

Woughton and Fishermead
Party	Candidate	Votes	%	±%
Labour	Hannah O'Neill	1,861	65.7	12.4
UKIP	Kenny Oshodi	488	17.2	−7.2
Conservative	Anthony Tull	368	13	2.7
Liberal Democrats	Donna Platt	115	4.1	−1.3
Majority		1,373	48.5	
Turnout		2,845	27.29	
Labour hold		Swing		
