= 2004 Milton Keynes Council election =

2004 UK local government election

The 2004 Milton Keynes Council election took place on 10 June 2004 to elect members of Milton Keynes Unitary Council in Buckinghamshire, England. One third of the council was up for election and the Liberal Democrats stayed in overall control of the council.

After the election, the composition of the council was:

- Liberal Democrat 27
- Labour 16
- Conservative 7
- Independent 1

== Election result ==
The results saw no change in the political composition, with the Liberal Democrats remaining in control of the council. The closest result came in Middleton ward, with the Liberal Democrats holding the seat by 2 votes after 8 recounts. Overall turnout in the election was 37%, an increase of 10% on the 2003 election.

Milton Keynes local election result 2004
| Party | Seats | Gains | Losses | Net gain/loss | Seats % | Votes % | Votes | +/− |
|---|---|---|---|---|---|---|---|---|
| Liberal Democrats | 8 | 0 | 0 | 0 | 47.1 | 24.6 | 11,868 | -5.9% |
| Labour | 7 | 0 | 0 | 0 | 41.2 | 26.5 | 12,801 | -3.1% |
| Conservative | 2 | 0 | 0 | 0 | 11.8 | 28.7 | 13,851 | -4.4% |
| UKIP | 0 | 0 | 0 | 0 | 0 | 13.7 | 6,606 | +10.8% |
| Independent | 0 | 0 | 0 | 0 | 0 | 3.3 | 1,582 | +1.5% |
| Green | 0 | 0 | 0 | 0 | 0 | 3.2 | 1,529 | +1.1% |

== Ward results ==
Bletchley and Fenny Stratford
| Party | Candidate | Votes | % | ±% |
|---|---|---|---|---|
| Labour | Michael Legg | 1,448 | 36.2 | −14.4 |
| Conservative | Roger Jacobs | 1,131 | 28.4 | −0.8 |
| Independent | Daniel Galvin | 581 | 14.6 | +4.6 |
| UKIP | Patricia McGuirk | 460 | 11.6 | +9.6 |
| Liberal Democrats | Vanessa McPake | 362 | 9.1 | +0.9 |
| Majority | | 317 | 8.0 | −13.4 |
| Turnout | | 3,982 | 45.3 | +5.2 |
| Labour hold | | Swing | | |

Bradwell
| Party | Candidate | Votes | % | ±% |
|---|---|---|---|---|
| Liberal Democrats | Philip Gerrella | 1,114 | 34.9 | −7.2 |
| Labour | George Byfield | 813 | 25.5 | −7.3 |
| Conservative | William Clark | 558 | 17.5 | +0.9 |
| UKIP | Robert Willsher | 484 | 15.2 | +11.0 |
| Green | Arnold Bailson | 225 | 7.0 | +2.7 |
| Majority | | 301 | 9.4 | +0.1 |
| Turnout | | 3,194 | 35.4 | +7.9 |
| Liberal Democrats hold | | Swing | | |

Campbell Park
| Party | Candidate | Votes | % | ±% |
|---|---|---|---|---|
| Liberal Democrats | Isabella Fraser | 1,050 | 36.9 | −11.3 |
| Labour | Martin Petchey | 759 | 26.6 | −1.7 |
| Conservative | James Langley | 450 | 15.8 | −2.2 |
| UKIP | Michael Maylam | 399 | 14.0 | +8.5 |
| Green | Jayne Meadows | 191 | 6.7 | +6.7 |
| Majority | | 291 | 10.2 | −9.7 |
| Turnout | | 2,849 | 28.5 | +5.9 |
| Liberal Democrats hold | | Swing | | |

Denbigh
| Party | Candidate | Votes | % | ±% |
|---|---|---|---|---|
| Labour | Elizabeth Campbell | 826 | 41.5 | |
| Conservative | John Bailey | 590 | 29.6 | |
| UKIP | Patrick France | 393 | 19.7 | |
| Liberal Democrats | Alice Tootill | 181 | 9.1 | |
| Majority | | 236 | 11.9 | |
| Turnout | | 1,990 | 34.8 | +7.0 |
| Labour hold | | Swing | | |

Eaton Manor
| Party | Candidate | Votes | % | ±% |
|---|---|---|---|---|
| Labour | Janet Lloyd | 869 | 46.8 | |
| Conservative | James Collins | 456 | 24.5 | |
| UKIP | Alison Phillips | 353 | 19.0 | |
| Liberal Democrats | Edis Bevan | 180 | 9.7 | |
| Majority | | 413 | 22.3 | |
| Turnout | | 1,858 | 33.6 | +6.2 |
| Labour hold | | Swing | | |

Emerson Valley
| Party | Candidate | Votes | % | ±% |
|---|---|---|---|---|
| Liberal Democrats | Martin Snell | 1,116 | 38.8 | −17.0 |
| Conservative | Alexander Swanson | 858 | 29.9 | +6.9 |
| Labour | Elaine Wales | 536 | 18.7 | −2.5 |
| UKIP | Donald Jeffery | 363 | 12.6 | +12.6 |
| Majority | | 258 | 9.0 | −23.9 |
| Turnout | | 2,873 | 32.0 | +9.0 |
| Liberal Democrats hold | | Swing | | |

Loughton Park
| Party | Candidate | Votes | % | ±% |
|---|---|---|---|---|
| Conservative | Donald Hoyle | 1,163 | 37.6 | −6.1 |
| Labour | Paul Day | 723 | 23.4 | −3.6 |
| Liberal Democrats | Rabih Makki | 435 | 14.1 | −0.4 |
| UKIP | Arnold Leeming | 429 | 13.9 | +10.6 |
| Independent | Neil Cawley | 345 | 11.1 | −0.4 |
| Majority | | 440 | 14.2 | −2.5 |
| Turnout | | 3,095 | 33.8 | +6.3 |
| Conservative hold | | Swing | | |

Middleton
| Party | Candidate | Votes | % | ±% |
|---|---|---|---|---|
| Liberal Democrats | Samuel Crooks | 946 | 39.7 | −4.4 |
| Conservative | David Bint | 944 | 39.6 | +4.0 |
| Labour | Ilhan Unsal | 220 | 9.2 | −2.7 |
| UKIP | Henry Hulse | 160 | 6.7 | +4.0 |
| Green | Katrina Topping | 114 | 4.8 | −0.9 |
| Majority | | 2 | 0.1 | −8.5 |
| Turnout | | 2,384 | 42.3 | +13.7 |
| Liberal Democrats hold | | Swing | | |

Newport Pagnell North
| Party | Candidate | Votes | % | ±% |
|---|---|---|---|---|
| Liberal Democrats | Michael Barry | 945 | 41.8 | |
| Conservative | Alan Richards | 634 | 28.0 | |
| UKIP | Stephen Cornwell | 389 | 17.2 | |
| Labour | Colin Lund | 209 | 9.2 | |
| Green | Caroline Lancaster | 84 | 3.7 | |
| Majority | | 311 | 13.8 | |
| Turnout | | 2,261 | 37.5 | +4.1 |
| Liberal Democrats hold | | Swing | | |

Newport Pagnell South
| Party | Candidate | Votes | % | ±% |
|---|---|---|---|---|
| Liberal Democrats | Douglas McCall | 922 | 42.8 | |
| Conservative | Anthony Kenyon | 571 | 26.5 | |
| UKIP | George Harlock | 311 | 14.4 | |
| Labour | Alan Williams | 238 | 11.0 | |
| Green | Clive Bailey | 114 | 5.3 | |
| Majority | | 351 | 16.3 | |
| Turnout | | 2,156 | 38.5 | +6.0 |
| Liberal Democrats hold | | Swing | | |

Olney
| Party | Candidate | Votes | % | ±% |
|---|---|---|---|---|
| Liberal Democrats | Stephen Clark | 1,369 | 41.5 | |
| Conservative | Peggy Butler | 1,272 | 38.6 | |
| Labour | Deirdre Bethune | 272 | 8.3 | |
| UKIP | Michael Phillips | 272 | 8.3 | |
| Green | George Richardson | 111 | 3.4 | |
| Majority | | 97 | 2.9 | |
| Turnout | | 3,296 | 51.5 | +8.7 |
| Liberal Democrats hold | | Swing | | |

Stantonbury
| Party | Candidate | Votes | % | ±% |
|---|---|---|---|---|
| Labour | Brian Morsley | 841 | 29.7 | −11.4 |
| Liberal Democrats | William Watts | 764 | 27.0 | +0.8 |
| Conservative | David Tunney | 709 | 25.1 | −2.3 |
| UKIP | Helen Davies | 347 | 12.3 | +12.3 |
| Green | Carol Barac | 167 | 5.9 | +0.5 |
| Majority | | 77 | 2.7 | −11.0 |
| Turnout | | 2,828 | 42.7 | +3.0 |
| Labour hold | | Swing | | |

Stony Stratford
| Party | Candidate | Votes | % | ±% |
|---|---|---|---|---|
| Conservative | Amanda Box | 1,504 | 41.3 | −5.9 |
| Labour | David Lewis | 1,078 | 29.6 | −0.1 |
| UKIP | Geoffrey Cavender | 547 | 15.0 | +5.9 |
| Liberal Democrats | Andrew Carr | 516 | 14.2 | +0.2 |
| Majority | | 426 | 11.7 | −5.8 |
| Turnout | | 3,645 | 40.4 | +9.0 |
| Conservative hold | | Swing | | |

Walton Park
| Party | Candidate | Votes | % | ±% |
|---|---|---|---|---|
| Liberal Democrats | Jaime Tamagnini-Barbosa | 1,196 | 37.0 | −9.1 |
| Conservative | Paul White | 1,147 | 35.4 | +4.7 |
| Labour | Claudia Beckley-Lines | 510 | 15.8 | −3.0 |
| UKIP | Christopher Tett | 383 | 11.8 | +7.4 |
| Majority | | 49 | 1.5 | −13.9 |
| Turnout | | 3,236 | 34.4 | +9.4 |
| Liberal Democrats hold | | Swing | | |

Whaddon
| Party | Candidate | Votes | % | ±% |
|---|---|---|---|---|
| Labour | Gladstone McKenzie | 1,180 | 42.8 | |
| Conservative | Donald McLeod | 965 | 35.0 | |
| UKIP | Pamela Meldrum | 402 | 14.6 | |
| Liberal Democrats | Jennifer Ferrans | 211 | 7.7 | |
| Majority | | 215 | 7.8 | |
| Turnout | | 2,758 | 42.1 | +8.0 |
| Labour hold | | Swing | | |

Wolverton
| Party | Candidate | Votes | % | ±% |
|---|---|---|---|---|
| Labour | Jessica Holroyd | 1,182 | 32.9 | −14.2 |
| Independent | Robert Galloway | 656 | 18.3 | +18.3 |
| Conservative | Dean Miah | 523 | 14.6 | −9.3 |
| UKIP | Judith Green | 495 | 13.8 | +13.8 |
| Green | Alan Francis | 396 | 11.0 | −1.5 |
| Liberal Democrats | Anthony Pilcher | 339 | 9.4 | −7.1 |
| Majority | | 526 | 14.6 | −8.6 |
| Turnout | | 3,591 | 34.8 | +10.9 |
| Labour hold | | Swing | | |

Woughton
| Party | Candidate | Votes | % | ±% |
|---|---|---|---|---|
| Labour | Kevin Wilson | 1,097 | 49.0 | −14.5 |
| UKIP | Francis McGuirk | 419 | 18.7 | +18.7 |
| Conservative | Nicholas Flaherty | 376 | 16.8 | −4.3 |
| Liberal Democrats | Nicolas Hubbard | 222 | 9.9 | −5.5 |
| Green | Peter Edwards | 127 | 5.7 | +5.7 |
| Majority | | 678 | 30.3 | −12.1 |
| Turnout | | 2,241 | 31.6 | +7.8 |
| Labour hold | | Swing | | |
