= 2014 Milton Keynes Council election =

2014 UK local government election

The 2014 Milton Keynes Council election took place on 22 May 2014 to elect members of Milton Keynes Council in England. This was on the same day as other local elections. The whole council (57 seats) was up for election due to a re-drawing of boundaries and an increase from 51 councillors. The council was under no overall control in advance of and after the vote.

After the election, the composition of the council was:

- Conservative 18
- Labour 25
- Liberal Democrat 13
- UK Independence Party 1

== Election result ==
Milton Keynes Council local election results 2014
Party	Seats	Gains	Losses	Net gain/loss	Seats %	Votes %	Votes	+/−
Conservative	18			-2	31.6	29.8	52,375	
Labour	25			+9	43.9	29.5	51,924	
UKIP	1			+1	1.8	18.1	31,749	
Liberal Democrats	13			-2	19.3	17.9	31,534	
Green	0			0	0.0	4.1	7,150	
Independent	0			0	0.0	0.6	1,075	
TUSC	0			0	0.0	0.1	124	

== Ward results ==
Bletchley East (3)
Party	Candidate	Votes	%	±%
Labour	Mohammed Khan	1,175		
Labour	Alan Webb	1,078		
UKIP	David Nash	1,077		
Labour	Suzanne Nti	1,056		
Conservative	Angela Kennedy	899		
UKIP	Vanita Samat	852		
Green	Lydia Jones	444		
Green	Toni Cardinali	412		
Green	Ali Hussain	316		
Liberal Democrats	Derek Francis	191		
Liberal Democrats	Ches Lincoln	121		
Liberal Democrats	Raissa Roy	97		
Turnout		3,323	33.3%	

Bletchley Park (3)
Party	Candidate	Votes	%	±%
Labour	Gladstone McKenzie	1,418		
Labour	Martin Gowans	1,385		
Conservative	Ann Clancy	1,272		
Labour	Elaine Wales	1,216		
UKIP	Anthony Lever	1,112		
Conservative	Hiten Ganatra	1,036		
UKIP	Ronald Kirkland	1,032		
UKIP	Paul Woodcraft	972		
Conservative	Alex Walker	970		
Green	Keith Allen	425		
Green	Paul Bowler	338		
Green	William Leahy	279		
Liberal Democrats	Victoria Gouldthorp	134		
Liberal Democrats	Brian Gouldthorp	125		
Liberal Democrats	Javid Rana	117		
Turnout		4,319	38.8%	

Bletchley West (3)
Party	Candidate	Votes	%	±%
Labour	Mick Legg	1,389		
Labour	Nigel Long	1,379		
Labour	Moriah Priestley	1,268		
UKIP	Derek Hircock	1,050		
UKIP	Adrian Pitfield	1,028		
UKIP	Carol Nash	951		
Conservative	Anthony Tull	804		
Conservative	Arun Nathan	723		
Conservative	Mari Topham	720		
Green	Liz Campbell	442		
Green	Anne Cryer-Whitehead	250		
Green	Mark Cryer-Whitehead	209		
Liberal Democrats	Alfred Vella	190		
Liberal Democrats	Carol Vella	185		
Liberal Democrats	Stephen Clark	165		
Turnout		3,862	35.1%	

Bradwell (3)
Party	Candidate	Votes	%	±%
Liberal Democrats	Rex Exon	1,259		
Labour	David Lewis	1,253		
Labour	Rachel Pallett	1,081		
Liberal Democrats	Marie Bradburn	1,071		
Liberal Democrats	Robin Bradburn	1,061		
Labour	David Prendergast	950		
UKIP	Cathy Kitchiner	737		
UKIP	Tony Peirson	690		
Conservative	Ryan Gray	561		
Conservative	Munir Bakare	545		
Conservative	Max Chaudhry	534		
Independent	Phil Gerrella	225		
TUSC	Katie Simpson	124		
Turnout		3,792	39%	

Broughton (3)
Party	Candidate	Votes	%	±%
Liberal Democrats	Sam Crooks	1,276		
Conservative	John Bint	1,206		
Conservative	Catriona Morris	1,009		
Conservative	Peter Cartwright	956		
Liberal Democrats	Andy Maric	931		
Liberal Democrats	Tony Oyakhire	890		
UKIP	Reggie Chopra	469		
Labour	Veronica Belcher	442		
Labour	Safeer Ahmad	369		
Labour	Kacper Sidorowicz	331		
Turnout		2,979	34.5%	

Campbell Park and Old Woughton (3)
Party	Candidate	Votes	%	±%
Liberal Democrats	Isobel McCall	1,287		
Liberal Democrats	Ric Brackenbury	1,283		
Conservative	Peter McDonald	1,128		
Liberal Democrats	Rosemary Snell	1,077		
Conservative	John Bailey	1,012		
Conservative	James Orr	936		
Labour	Janet Maclean	762		
Labour	David Baume	754		
Labour	Adan Kahin	640		
UKIP	Terry Grehan	563		
UKIP	Julian Warr	523		
UKIP	Paul Harvey	513		
Green	Carol Barac	370		
Turnout		3,926	40.3%	

Central Milton Keynes (3)
Party	Candidate	Votes	%	±%
Labour	Sarah Betteley	1,224		
Labour	Pauline Wallis	1,077		
Labour	Paul Williams	997		
Conservative	Isabella Fraser	618		
UKIP	Jez Penwarden	582		
UKIP	Richard Shiers	523		
Conservative	Tom Fraser	547		
UKIP	Paul Watson	533		
Liberal Democrats	Kerrie Bradburn	464		
Conservative	Tubo Uranta	435		
Liberal Democrats	Paul Graham	385		
Liberal Democrats	Patrick McQuillan	302		
Turnout		2,893	28.4%	

Danesborough and Walton (3)
Party	Candidate	Votes	%	±%
Conservative	David Hopkins	1,837		
Conservative	Victoria Hopkins	1,541		
Conservative	Alice Bramall	1,496		
Labour	Margaret Woodward	646		
UKIP	Theresa Clarke	633		
Labour	Barbara Senior	626		
Labour	Jack Jenkins	562		
UKIP	Thomas Humphries	533		
UKIP	Roger Nye	503		
Liberal Democrats	Ian Nuttall	438		
Liberal Democrats	Russell Houchin	336		
Liberal Democrats	Edis Bevan	172		
Turnout		3,463	38.2%	

Loughton and Shenley (3)
Party	Candidate	Votes	%	±%
Labour	Matt Clifton	1,353		
Labour	Zoe Nolan	1,338		
Conservative	Andy Dransfield	1,321		
Conservative	Isabell Procter	1,283		
Conservative	Donald Hoyle	1,282		
Labour	Ansar Hussain	1,126		
UKIP	Michael Dean	716		
UKIP	David Reilly	607		
UKIP	Vivian Krajicek	598		
Green	Keri Edmonds	405		
Liberal Democrats	Bob Benning	233		
Liberal Democrats	Paul Bailey	228		
Liberal Democrats	Christopher Thompson	180		
Turnout		3,870	37%	

Monkston (3)
Party	Candidate	Votes	%	±%
Liberal Democrats	Jenni Ferrans	1,128		
Liberal Democrats	Vanessa McPake	1,085		
Liberal Democrats	Subhan Shafiq	981		
Conservative	Andrew Buckley	833		
Conservative	Uroy Clarke	656		
Conservative	Reena Gour	621		
UKIP	Lee Barney	618		
Labour	Kathryn Colgrave	576		
Labour	Rita Eisen	525		
Labour	Kit Power	393		
Turnout		2,892	31.6%	

Newport Pagnell North and Hanslope (3)
Party	Candidate	Votes	%	±%
Conservative	Andrew Geary	1,735	53.4%	
Conservative	Jeanette Green	1,550	47.7%	
Conservative	Lynn Patey-Smith	1,347	41.5%	
UKIP	Mark Newbold	1,096	33.8%	
Liberal Democrats	Jane Carr	706	21.7%	
Liberal Democrats	Alan Richards	650	20.0%	
Liberal Democrats	David Ball	641	19.7%	
Labour	Ruth Cover	601	18.5%	
Labour	Hilary Saunders	521	16.0%	
Green	Matthew Jeffery	456	14.0%	
Labour	Alan Price	439	13.5%	
Turnout		3,795	39.1%	

Newport Pagnell South (3)
Party	Candidate	Votes	%	±%
Liberal Democrats	Paul Alexander	1,433		
Liberal Democrats	Douglas McCall	1,431		
Liberal Democrats	Derek Eastman	1,423		
Conservative	Richard Gates	670		
Conservative	Chris Wardle	653		
Conservative	Nicholas Flaherty	600		
UKIP	Stuart Moore	582		
UKIP	Nicholas Rose	561		
UKIP	Amanda Woods	510		
Green	Graham Edward Findlay	358		
Labour	Paul Day	347		
Labour	Alexander Price	295		
Labour	Paula Bonarius	254		
Turnout		3,392	36.6%	

Olney (3)
Party	Candidate	Votes	%	±%
Conservative	Peter Geary	2,115		
Conservative	Keith McLean	1,856		
Conservative	David Hosking	1,800		
UKIP	Dana Green	769		
Labour	Dee Bethune	693		
UKIP	David Davenport	638		
UKIP	Neil Greenfield	518		
Labour	David Trend	509		
Labour	Courtney Jones	505		
Liberal Democrats	Val Menzies	477		
Liberal Democrats	Katherine Cowell	381		
Liberal Democrats	Alan Tootill	264		
Turnout		3,970	41.3%	

Shenley Brook End (3)
Party	Candidate	Votes	%	±%
Liberal Democrats	Chris Williams	1,145		
Liberal Democrats	Peter Cannon	1,135		
Liberal Democrats	Stuart Burke	1,101		
Conservative	Kevin Geaney	776		
Conservative	Maggie Geaney	768		
Labour	David Morgan	647		
Conservative	Brandon Topham	590		
Labour	Sue Sullivan	575		
UKIP	Philip Pinto	566		
UKIP	Leslie Ive	531		
UKIP	Bill Smith	499		
Labour	Mohammed Rahman	488		
Green	Rhea Simpson	245		
Turnout		3,297	34%	

Stantonbury (3)
Party	Candidate	Votes	%	±%
Labour	Margaret Burke	1,457		
Labour	Brian White	1,324		
Labour	Martin Petchey	1,131		
Conservative	Graham Davison	1,037		
Conservative	Barbara Wright	910		
UKIP	Adam Fellowes	861		
UKIP	Margaret Jeffery	802		
UKIP	Pauline Moore	797		
Conservative	Fazilat Shivji	672		
Green	Peter Edwards	510		
Liberal Democrats	Richard Curtis	410		
Liberal Democrats	Alan Mallyon	368		
Liberal Democrats	Kathleen Greenwood	343		
Independent	Anita Rose	264		
Turnout		3,987	35.1%	

Stony Stratford (3)
Party	Candidate	Votes	%	±%
Labour	Liz Gifford	1,308		
Labour	Robert Gifford	1,278		
Conservative	Denise Brunning	1,246		
Conservative	Phil Wharton	1,208		
Labour	Arshad Majid	979		
Conservative	Ruth Jury	977		
UKIP	Philip Blowfield	808		
Green	Michael Sheppard	461		
Liberal Democrats	Martin Clarke	188		
Liberal Democrats	Christopher Eaton	129		
Liberal Democrats	Donna Platt	96		
Turnout		3,380	42.4%	

Tattenhoe (3)
Party	Candidate	Votes	%	±%
Conservative	Edith Bald	825		
Conservative	Gerald Small	737		
Conservative	Geetha Morla	666		
Labour	Carole Baume	533		
Labour	Dominic Dyer	510		
Labour	Vicky Mensah	466		
UKIP	Vince Peddle	444		
UKIP	Gareth Tyzack	338		
UKIP	Lesley Ramswell	330		
Liberal Democrats	Susan Burke	263		
Liberal Democrats	Eric Cooper	257		
Liberal Democrats	Matt Drewett	199		
Green	Amanda Youngs	196		
Turnout		2,145	28.5%	

Wolverton (3)
Party	Candidate	Votes	%	±%
Labour	Robert Middleton	1,343		
Labour	Norman Miles	1,292		
Labour	Peter Marland	1,273		
UKIP	Ronen Ghose	834		
Conservative	Mohammed Anwar	774		
UKIP	Patricia Ramswell	667		
Conservative	Ian Townsend	642		
Green	Alan Francis	572		
Conservative	Shouket Mirza	516		
Green	Jennifer Marklew	462		
Liberal Democrats	Haroon Qureshi	275		
Liberal Democrats	Ans Bukhari	233		
Liberal Democrats	Masood Jehangir	113		
Turnout		3,544	33%	

Woughton and Fishermead (3)
Party	Candidate	Votes	%	±%
Labour	Steve Coventry	1,683		
Labour	Hannah O'Neill	1,562		
Labour	Kevin Wilson	1,522		
UKIP	Donald Jeffery	744		
UKIP	Wendy Davenport	743		
UKIP	Kenny Oshodi	696		
Conservative	Lynne Carter	360		
Conservative	Jimmi Macaulay	285		
Conservative	Patricia Townsend	279		
Independent	Terry Baines	219		
Independent	Darron Kendrick	201		
Liberal Democrats	Cec Tallack	176		
Liberal Democrats	Colin Howarth	175		
Independent	David Priest	166		
Liberal Democrats	Joyce Tootill	130		
Turnout		3,234	29.3%	

== See also ==
Milton Keynes Council elections for details of wards.
