= 2023 Milton Keynes City Council election =

2023 UK local government election

← 2022	4 May 2023	2024 →

20 out of 57 seats to Milton Keynes City Council 29 seats needed for a majority
- Turnout: 30.9%

	First party	Second party	Third party
Leader	Peter Marland	David Hopkins	Robin Bradburn
Party	Labour	Conservative	Liberal Democrats
Last election	20 seats, 36.5%	22 seats, 35.0%	14 seats, 21.2%
Seats before	19	22	14
Seats won	12	2	6
Seats after	25	17	15
Seat change	▲5	▼6	▲1
Popular vote	24,224	20,761	13,735
Percentage	38.2%	32.7%	21.6%
Swing	▲1.7%	▼2.3%	▲0.4%
- Winner of each seat at the 2023 Milton Keynes Council election
Leader before election
Peter Marland
Labour
No overall control
Leader after election
Peter Marland
Labour
No overall control

The 2023 Milton Keynes City Council election took place on 4 May 2023 to elect members of Milton Keynes City Council in the ceremonial county of Buckinghamshire, England. This was on the same day as other local elections across England.

At the election, the council remained under no overall control, with the Labour Party (who topped the poll for the second consecutive year) making significant gains at the expense of the Conservatives. The Labour and Liberal Democrat coalition which had been running the council prior to the election continued to form the council's leadership.

== Summary ==
=== Election result ===
2023 Milton Keynes City Council election
Party	This election			Full council			This election		
Party	Seats	Net	Seats %	Other	Total	Total %	Votes	Votes %	+/−
Labour	12	▲5	60.0	10	25	43.9	24,224	38.2	+1.7
Conservative	2	▼6	10.0	15	17	29.8	20,761	32.7	–2.3
Liberal Democrats	6	▲1	30.0	9	15	26.3	13,735	21.6	+0.4
Green	0	0	0.0	0	0	0.0	3,579	5.6	+0.1
Reform UK	0	0	0.0	0	0	0.0	941	1.5	New
Women's Equality	0	0	0.0	0	0	0.0	128	0.2	–0.1
Heritage	0	0	0.0	0	0	0.0	87	0.1	New

== Ward results ==
The Statement of Persons Nominated, which details the candidates standing in each ward, was released by Milton Keynes City Council following the close of nominations on 5 April 2023.

=== Bletchley East ===
Bletchley East
Party	Candidate	Votes	%	±%
Labour Co-op	Emily Darlington*	1,602	56.8	+4.8
Conservative	James Marlow	716	25.4	–5.4
Liberal Democrats	Sean McCabe	191	6.8	–2.1
Green	Axel Segebecht	157	5.6	–2.7
Reform UK	Jane Duckworth	154	5.5	N/A
Majority		886	31.4	
Turnout		2,834	22.7	–2.9
Registered electors		12,471		
Labour Co-op hold		Swing	▲5.1	

=== Bletchley Park ===
Bletchley Park
Party	Candidate	Votes	%	±%
Labour Co-op	Waqas Ahmad	1,427	41.5	–4.0
Conservative	Nabeel Nazir*	1,360	39.5	–4.1
Green	Michael Shepperd	282	8.2	+3.1
Liberal Democrats	Timothy Gomm	229	6.7	+1.0
Reform UK	Mark Rossouw	141	4.1	N/A
Majority		67	2.0	
Turnout		3,448	31.2	–3.3
Registered electors		11,074		
Labour Co-op gain from Conservative		Swing	▲0.1	

=== Bletchley West ===
Bletchley West
Party	Candidate	Votes	%	±%
Labour Co-op	Lauren Townsend*	1,412	44.0	–5.1
Conservative	Ade Adeliyi	1,206	37.6	–0.4
Liberal Democrats	Benjamin Edwards	217	6.8	+2.3
Green	Joe French	198	6.2	+2.4
Reform UK	Ray Brady	177	5.5	N/A
Majority		206	6.4	
Turnout		3,219	31.4	–4.4
Registered electors		10,261		
Labour Co-op hold		Swing	▼2.4	

=== Bradwell ===
Bradwell
Party	Candidate	Votes	%	±%
Liberal Democrats	Robin Bradburn*	1,652	57.3	–0.4
Labour	Hilary Saunders	755	26.2	+1.4
Conservative	Krishna Panthula	476	16.5	–1.0
Majority		897	31.1	
Turnout		2,901	30.7	–1.6
Registered electors		9,450		
Liberal Democrats hold		Swing	▼0.9	

=== Broughton ===
Boughton
Party	Candidate	Votes	%	±%
Liberal Democrats	Kerrie Bradburn*	2,093	58.8	+7.7
Conservative	Dev Ahuja	818	23.0	–9.9
Labour	Ayesha Khanom	561	15.8	–0.2
Heritage	Alfred Saint-Clair	87	2.4	N/A
Majority		1,275	35.8	
Turnout		3,568	27.1	–3.2
Registered electors		13,162		
Liberal Democrats hold		Swing	▲8.8	

=== Campbell Park & Old Woughton ===
Campbell Park & Old Woughton
Party	Candidate	Votes	%	±%
Liberal Democrats	Paul Trendall*	1,695	48.0	+3.3
Conservative	John Hearnshaw	1,031	29.2	–7.4
Labour	David Baume	615	17.4	–1.3
Green	Carol Barac	193	5.5	N/A
Majority		664	18.8	
Turnout		3,548	35.9	–3.1
Registered electors		9,879		
Liberal Democrats hold		Swing	▲5.4	

=== Central Milton Keynes ===
Central Milton Keynes (2 seats due to by-election)
Party	Candidate	Votes	%	±%
Labour	Darron Kendrick	1,201	51.1	–3.1
Labour	Martin Petchey	1,080	46.0	–8.2
Conservative	Toby Poyner	589	25.1	–0.5
Conservative	Cindy Taylor	562	23.9	–1.7
Liberal Democrats	Duncan Banks	349	14.9	–5.3
Liberal Democrats	Russell Houchin	323	13.8	–6.4
Green	Simon Green	254	10.8	N/A
Turnout		2,349	22.6	–2.5
Registered electors		10,395		
Labour hold				
Labour hold				

=== Danesborough & Walton ===
Danesborough & Walton
Party	Candidate	Votes	%	±%
Labour	Tracey Bailey	1,617	41.1	+15.1
Conservative	Marlese Levermore	1,452	36.9	–13.0
Green	Peter Skelton	409	10.4	–2.4
Liberal Democrats	Rebecca Cave	279	7.1	–4.2
Reform UK	Chris Northcott	174	4.4	N/A
Majority		165	4.2	
Turnout		3,940	33.6	+0.1
Registered electors		11,725		
Labour gain from Conservative		Swing	▲14.1	

=== Loughton & Shenley ===
Loughton & Shenley
Party	Candidate	Votes	%	±%
Labour	Brigid McBride	1,652	48.5	–3.4
Conservative	Rajeev Sharma	1,315	38.6	+0.8
Liberal Democrats	Garrath Green	264	7.7	+2.1
Green	Vanessa Skelton	178	5.2	+0.5
Majority		337	9.9	
Turnout		3,430	34.6	–7.0
Registered electors		9,908		
Labour gain from Conservative		Swing	▼2.1	

=== Monkston ===
Monkston
Party	Candidate	Votes	%	±%
Liberal Democrats	Ben Adewale	1,270	51.6	–6.4
Conservative	Jaime Tamagnini	546	22.2	–0.2
Labour	Monica Dowling	471	19.1	–0.5
Green	Ammar Noorwali	174	7.1	N/A
Majority		724	29.4	
Turnout		2,474	26.9	–2.3
Registered electors		9,183		
Liberal Democrats hold		Swing	▼3.1	

=== Newport Pagnell North & Hanslope ===
Newport Pagnell North & Hanslope
Party	Candidate	Votes	%	±%
Conservative	Alison Andrew	1,628	44.5	–2.3
Liberal Democrats	Scott Humphries	1,162	31.8	+13.3
Labour	Carol Wood	737	20.2	–1.5
Women's Equality	Jane Whild	128	3.5	–2.6
Majority		466	12.7	
Turnout		3,673	37.1	+0.9
Registered electors		9,898		
Conservative hold		Swing	▼7.8	

=== Newport Pagnell South ===
Newport Pagnell South
Party	Candidate	Votes	%	±%
Liberal Democrats	Jane Carr*	1,475	46.1	–4.4
Conservative	James Darling	1,098	34.3	+1.0
Labour	Veronica Belcher	510	15.9	–0.3
Reform UK	Lynn Cocksedge	120	3.7	N/A
Majority		377	11.8	
Turnout		3,216	36.3	+0.5
Registered electors		8,853		
Liberal Democrats hold		Swing	▼2.7	

=== Olney ===
Olney
Party	Candidate	Votes	%	±%
Labour	Debbie Whitworth	1,903	44.8	+26.2
Conservative	David Hosking	1,857	43.8	+3.5
Green	Dominic Taylor	236	5.6	–15.5
Liberal Democrats	Dominic Dyer	131	3.1	N/A
Reform UK	Nigel Birrell	117	2.8	N/A
Majority		46	1.0	
Turnout		4,252	43.5	+1.7
Registered electors		9,776		
Labour gain from Conservative		Swing	▲11.4	

=== Shenley Brook End ===
Shenley Brook End
Party	Candidate	Votes	%	±%
Liberal Democrats	Sophie Bell	1,184	38.7	–7.6
Conservative	Saleea Raja*	1,180	38.6	+3.9
Labour	Christian Durugo	529	17.3	–1.7
Green	Daniel Barthaud	164	5.4	N/A
Majority		4	0.1	
Turnout		3,068	32.4	–1.5
Registered electors		9,467		
Liberal Democrats gain from Conservative		Swing	▼5.8	

=== Stantonbury ===
Stantonbury
Party	Candidate	Votes	%	±%
Labour	Stephen Brown	1,756	50.3	+4.1
Conservative	Greg Pius	1,117	32.0	−6.2
Green	Gary Lloyd	312	8.9	+0.5
Liberal Democrats	Greg Duffield	283	8.1	+0.9
Majority		639	18.3	
Turnout		3,489	31.5	–4.4
Registered electors		11,073		
Labour gain from Conservative		Swing	▲5.2	

=== Stony Stratford ===
Stony Stratford
Party	Candidate	Votes	%	±%
Labour	Akash Nayee	1,872	46.2	–6.6
Conservative	Godwin Michael	1,490	36.8	+1.9
Liberal Democrats	Richard Greenwood	406	10.0	+3.4
Green	Joan Hughes	281	6.9	+1.2
Majority		382	9.4	
Turnout		4,069	34.1	–3.7
Registered electors		11,919		
Labour hold		Swing	▼4.3	

=== Tattenhoe ===
Tattenhoe
Party	Candidate	Votes	%	±%
Conservative	James Lancaster*	1,329	45.7	+2.0
Labour Co-op	Rukhsana Malik	1,183	40.6	+3.6
Green	Lucy Bjorck	204	7.0	–3.0
Liberal Democrats	Steven Walden	137	4.7	–4.6
Reform UK	Dan Matthews	58	2.0	N/A
Majority		146	5.1	
Turnout		2,923	33.2	+2.0
Registered electors		8,816		
Conservative hold		Swing	▼0.8	

=== Wolverton ===
Wolverton
Party	Candidate	Votes	%	±%
Labour Co-op	Peter Marland*	1,959	62.2	+2.5
Conservative	Edith Bald	610	19.4	–3.3
Green	Alan Francis	370	11.8	–0.6
Liberal Democrats	Tony Oyakhire	209	6.6	+1.4
Majority		1,349	42.8	
Turnout		3,167	29.3	–2.5
Registered electors		10,823		
Labour Co-op hold		Swing	▲2.9	

=== Woughton & Fishermead ===
Woughton & Fishermead
Party	Candidate	Votes	%	±%
Labour	Sue Smith	1,382	65.3	–4.6
Conservative	Tatiana Vassilakis	381	18.0	–2.2
Liberal Democrats	Caroline Picking	186	8.8	–1.1
Green	Tony Coughlan	167	7.9	N/A
Majority		1,001	47.3	
Turnout		2,126	18.5	–2.8
Registered electors		11,493		
Labour hold		Swing	▼1.2	

== By-elections ==
=== Newport Pagnell South ===
Newport Pagnell South: 21 September 2023
Party	Candidate	Votes	%	±%
Liberal Democrats	Tony Oyakhire	1,088	43.5	+5.4
Labour	Saskia Soden	684	27.4	+13.5
Conservative	Ade Adeliyi	561	22.4	−19.8
Green	Gary Lloyd	80	3.2	−2.5
Independent	Lynn Cocksedge	53	2.1	N/A
Women's Equality	Jane Whild	34	1.4	N/A
Majority		404	16.1	+12.0
Turnout		2,500	28.3	−10.9
Registered electors		8,851		
Liberal Democrats gain from Conservative		Swing	▲12.6	

=== Loughton & Shenley ===
Loughton & Shenley: 22 February 2024
Party	Candidate	Votes	%	±%
Labour	Leo Montague	1,136	46.0	−2.5
Conservative	Rajeev Sharma	971	39.4	+0.8
Liberal Democrats	Garrath Green	179	7.3	−0.4
Green	Tim Lee	113	4.6	−0.6
Independent	Ray Brady	61	2.5	N/A
Majority		165	6.6	−3.3
Turnout		2,467	25.1	−9.5
Registered electors		9,846		
Labour hold		Swing	▼1.7	
