= 2007 Milton Keynes Council election =

2007 UK local government election

The 2007 Milton Keynes Council election took place on 3 May 2007 to elect members of Milton Keynes Unitary Council in Buckinghamshire, England. One third of the council – the seats contested in the 2003 election – was up for election and the council remained under no overall control.

After the election, the composition of the council was:

- Liberal Democrat 22 (–1)
- Conservative 15 (+2)
- Labour 13 (–1)
- Independent 1

== Election result ==
The Conservative Party won the seat in Bletchley and Fenny Stratford from Labour and the seat in Middleton from the Liberal Democrats to make up further ground made in the previous year's election.

Milton Keynes local election result 2007
Party	Seats	Gains	Losses	Net gain/loss	Seats %	Votes %	Votes	+/−
Conservative	6	2	0	+2	35.3	37.3	17,841	+1.8%
Liberal Democrats	8	0	1	-1	47.1	30.6	14,633	+0.6%
Labour	3	0	1	-1	17.6	24.5	11,711	+1.8%
UKIP	0	0	0	0	0	5.3	2,513	+2.7%
Green	0	0	0	0	0	2.3	1,080	-0.3%
Independent	0	0	0	0	0	2.3	1,080	–1.4%
