= 2008 Milton Keynes Council election =

English local election

The 2008 Milton Keynes Council election took place on 1 May 2008 to elect members of Milton Keynes Unitary Council in Buckinghamshire, England. One third of the council – the 17 seats contested in the 2004 election – was up for election and the council, which totalled 51 seats, remained under no overall control.

After the election, the composition of the council was:

- Liberal Democrat 21 (–1)
- Conservative 20 (+5)
- Labour 10 (–4)

== Election result ==
Milton Keynes local election result 2008
Party	Seats	Gains	Losses	Net gain/loss	Seats %	Votes %	Votes	+/−
Conservative	7	5	0	+5	41.2	40.2	19,383	+3.3%
Liberal Democrats	7	0	1	-1	41.2	30.1	14,516	-0.5%
Labour	3	0	4	-4	17.6	22.1	10,664	-1.6%
UKIP	0	0	0	0	0	3.7	1,792	-1.4%
Independent	0	0	0	0	0	2.4	1,136	–0.1%
Green	0	0	0	0	0	0.8	375	-1.5%
England First	0	0	0	0	0	0.6	309	+0.6%
