= 2011 Milton Keynes Council election =

2011 UK local government election

The 2011 Milton Keynes Council election took place on 5 May 2011 to elect members of Milton Keynes Unitary Council in Buckinghamshire, England. One third of the council – the 17 seats contested in the 2007 election – was up for election and the council, which totalled 51 seats, remained under no overall control.

After the election, the composition of the council was:

- Conservative 21 (+4)
- Liberal Democrat 18 (–4)
- Labour 9
- Independent 3

== Election results ==
The Conservative Party won four seats from the Liberal Democrats – in Emerson Valley, Linford South, Sherington and Walton Park. All other seats remained in the same hands. Two Liberal Democrats representatives had become Independent seats between the 2010 and 2011 elections.

Milton Keynes Council Election, 2011
Party	Seats	Gains	Losses	Net gain/loss	Seats %	Votes %	Votes	+/−
Conservative	9	4	0	+4	58.8	37.2	20,444	+3.7%
Liberal Democrats	5	0	4	-4	29.4	24.5	13,452	-0.8%
Labour	3	0	0	0	17.6	27.5	15,145	+2.6%
UKIP	0	0	0	0	0.0	5.8	3,200	–0.5%
Green	0	0	0	0	0.0	5.0	2,746	+0.7%
Independent	0	0	0	0	5.9	0.1	53	+0.1%

== Ward results ==
Bletchley and Fenny Stratford
Party	Candidate	Votes	%	±%
Conservative	Michael Klein	1,692	37.9	−0.6
Labour	Rita Venn	1,614	36.1	+4.0
Green	Paul Bowler	545	12.2	+12.2
UKIP	Adrian Pitfield	341	7.6	+7.6
Liberal Democrats	Susan Burke	278	6.2	−2.9
Conservative hold		Swing		

Bradwell
Party	Candidate	Votes	%	±%
Liberal Democrats	Robert Exon	1,386	40.8	+3.3
Labour	Pauline Wallis	1,086	32.0	+3.5
Conservative	Thomas Curragh	672	19.8	−2.0
Green	Edward May	151	4.5	−2.7
UKIP	Judith Green	101	3.0	+−2.1
Liberal Democrats hold		Swing		

Campbell Park
Party	Candidate	Votes	%	±%
Liberal Democrats	Cec Tallack	1,224	36.9	−2.6
Labour	Paul Williams	1,222	36.8	+8.3
Conservative	James Orr	551	16.6	−2.7
Green	Carol Barac	173	5.2	+5.2
Liberal Democrats hold		Swing		

Danesborough
Party	Candidate	Votes	%	±%
Conservative	David Hopkins	1,377	75.6	−1.6
Labour	Margaret Woodward	246	13.5	+7.0
Liberal Democrats	Valerie Menzies	102	5.6	−0.5
UKIP	Arnold Leeming	96	5.3	+0.1
Conservative hold		Swing		

Emerson Valley
Party	Candidate	Votes	%	±%
Conservative	Edith Bald	1,690	39.9	+2.2
Liberal Democrats	Rosemary Snell	1,267	29.9	−14.6
Labour	Sairam Reddy	900	21.3	+7.8
UKIP	Joseph Pinto	220	5.2	+0.9
Green	Philip Buckley	158	3.7	+3.7
Conservative gain from Liberal Democrats		Swing		

Furzton
Party	Candidate	Votes	%	±%
Liberal Democrats	Chris Williams	1,077	43.3	−10.0
Conservative	Margaret Geaney	622	25.0	−12.7
Labour	David Morgan	556	22.4	+8.9
UKIP	Stuart Moore	161	6.5	+2.2
Green	Beverley Caprice	72	2.9	+2.9
Liberal Democrats hold		Swing		

Hanslope Park
Party	Candidate	Votes	%	±%
Conservative	Andrew Geary	1,401	71.3	−0.1
Labour	David Flatman	309	15.7	+0.4
Liberal Democrats	Richard Curtis	167	8.5	−0.1
UKIP	Graham White	87	4.4	−0.3
Conservative hold		Swing		

Linford North
Party	Candidate	Votes	%	±%
Liberal Democrats	Alan Richards	1,112	37.4	−3.4
Conservative	David Tunney	935	31.4	−3.1
Labour	Brian Barton	537	18.1	+5.0
UKIP	Helen Davies	175	5.9	−1.8
Liberal Democrats hold		Swing		

Hanslope Park
Party	Candidate	Votes	%	±%
Conservative	Catriona Morris	1,093	36.9	+1.4
Liberal Democrats	David Howlett	877	29.6	−9.1
Labour	Rob Middleton	655	22.1	+6.0
Green	Caroline Lancaster	209	7.1	+0.8
UKIP	Ronen Ghose	129	4.4	−0.8
Conservative gain from Liberal Democrats		Swing		

Loughton Park
Party	Candidate	Votes	%	±%
Conservative	Ruth Jury	1,989	45.6	−5.7
Labour	Peter Todd	1,383	31.7	+5.9
Liberal Democrats	Christopher Thompson	467	10.7	−5.4
UKIP	Catherine Kitchiner	268	6.1	−0.7
Conservative hold		Swing		

Middleton
Party	Candidate	Votes	%	±%
Conservative	John Bint	1,894	50.1	+5.9
Liberal Democrats	Ozoyah Oyakhire	1,055	27.9	−12.4
Labour	Mohammed Khan	577	15.3	+5.1
Green	John Creaser	162	4.3	+0.8
UKIP	Roger Nye	95	2.5	+0.6
Conservative hold		Swing		

Sherington
Party	Candidate	Votes	%	±%
Conservative	Donald Mclean	1,082	54.0	+7.3
Liberal Democrats	Sam Potts	682	34.0	−13.1
Labour	Alan Price	131	6.5	+2.8
UKIP	Raymond Denman	109	5.4	+3.0
Conservative gain from Liberal Democrats		Swing		

Stantonbury
Party	Candidate	Votes	%	±%
Labour	Brian White	950	34.7	−3.4
Conservative	Graham Davison	866	31.7	+7.9
Liberal Democrats	Sean Barnes	632	23.1	−8.7
UKIP	Harvey Rainbow	180	6.6	+0.2
Green	Thomas Bulman	107	3.9	+3.9
Labour hold		Swing		

Stony Stratford
Party	Candidate	Votes	%	±%
Conservative	Philip Wharton	1,902	46.4	−4.7
Labour	Arshad Majid	1,052	25.7	−5.4
Green	Michael Sheppard	422	10.3	+10.3
Liberal Democrats	Adrian Dnes	406	9.9	+0.7
UKIP	Steven Beaumont	315	7.7	−0.9
Conservative hold		Swing		

Walton Park
Party	Candidate	Votes	%	±%
Conservative	Lee Barney	1,704	40.4	+6.4
Liberal Democrats	Vanessa McPake	1,500	35.6	−3.8
Labour	Moriah Priestley	757	18.0	+7.8
UKIP	Sandra Lindley	256	6.1	+3.0
Conservative gain from Liberal Democrats		Swing		

Wolverton
Party	Candidate	Votes	%	±%
Labour	Peter Marland	1,733	43.4	+6.5
Liberal Democrats	Patrick McQuillan	1,073	26.9	−6.5
Conservative	Shout Mirza	560	14.0	−2.2
Green	Alan Francis	332	8.3	+0.8
UKIP	Vincent Peddle	299	7.5	+1.9
Labour hold		Swing		

Woughton
Party	Candidate	Votes	%	±%
Labour	Stephen Coventry	1,437	64.8	+5.3
Conservative	Jinmi Macaulay	414	18.7	−1.1
UKIP	Arthur Morton	219	9.9	−0.6
Liberal Democrats	Darron Kendrick	147	6.6	−3.6
Labour hold		Swing		
