= 1999 Milton Keynes Council election =

1999 UK local government election

The 1999 Milton Keynes Council election took place on 6 May 1999 to elect members of Milton Keynes Unitary Council in Buckinghamshire, England. One third of the council was up for election and the Labour party stayed in overall control of the council.

After the election, the composition of the council was

- Labour 27
- Liberal Democrat 19
- Conservative 4
- Independent 1

== Background ==
In the February before the election Milton Keynes held a referendum on the level of council tax increase there would be and the corresponding changes in services that would be made. Voters on a 45% turnout chose the middle option of a 9.8% increase, which meant that council tax levels were not a major issue in the election campaign.

== Election result ==
The results saw Labour hold onto a majority on the council after the other parties failed to make the 2 gains needed to deprive Labour of control. Overall turnout in the election was 29.1%.

Milton Keynes local election result 1999
Party	Seats	Gains	Losses	Net gain/loss	Seats %	Votes %	Votes	+/−
Labour	8	1	1	0	47.1	36.8	11,370	
Liberal Democrats	6	1	1	0	35.3	28.9	8,944	
Conservative	2	1	1	0	11.8	29.4	9,079	
Independent	1	0	0	0	5.9	3.4	1,066	
Green	0	0	0	0	0	1.2	384	
Campaign for Disabled	0	0	0	0	0	0.2	68	

== Ward results ==
Campbell Park
Party	Candidate	Votes	%	±%
Liberal Democrats	Isobel Wilson	1,353	61.5	
Labour	Martin Petchey	587	26.7	
Conservative	Malcolm Fryer-Kelsey	193	8.8	
Campaign for Disabled	Anita Rose	68	3.1	
Majority		766	34.8	
Turnout		2,201		
Liberal Democrats hold		Swing		

Danesborough
Party	Candidate	Votes	%	±%
Conservative	Paul White	863	47.3	
Liberal Democrats	Derek Eastman	723	39.6	
Labour	Alan Hunter	240	13.1	
Majority		140	7.7	
Turnout		1,826		
Conservative gain from Liberal Democrats		Swing		

Denbigh
Party	Candidate	Votes	%	±%
Labour	Michael Legg	1,225	52.0	
Conservative	Roger Jacobs	774	32.8	
Liberal Democrats	Rosemary Drewett	359	15.2	
Majority		451	19.1	
Turnout		2,358		
Labour hold		Swing		

Emerson Valley
Party	Candidate	Votes	%	±%
Liberal Democrats	Stuart Burke	896	52.0	
Labour	Leslie Hostler	596	34.6	
Conservative	Kevin Hall	232	13.5	
Majority		300	17.4	
Turnout		1,724		
Liberal Democrats gain from Labour		Swing		

Fenny Stratford
Party	Candidate	Votes	%	±%
Labour	Grant Gillingham	727	53.2	
Conservative	Dennis Thatcher	471	34.5	
Liberal Democrats	Alfred Vella	168	12.3	
Majority		256	18.7	
Turnout		1,366		
Labour hold		Swing		

Furzton
Party	Candidate	Votes	%	±%
Labour	Roger Bristow	689	53.0	
Conservative	Dean Miah	371	28.5	
Liberal Democrats	Christopher Williams	241	18.5	
Majority		318	24.4	
Turnout		1,301		
Labour hold		Swing		

Hanslope Park
Party	Candidate	Votes	%	±%
Independent	Bert Tapp	1,066	74.0	
Conservative	Neil Cawley	231	16.0	
Labour	Graeme Lindsay	96	6.7	
Liberal Democrats	Edis Bevan	47	3.3	
Majority		835	58.0	
Turnout		1,440		
Independent hold		Swing		

Linford North
Party	Candidate	Votes	%	±%
Liberal Democrats	Alan Pugh	891	45.5	
Conservative	David Tunney	556	28.4	
Labour	John McLinton	445	22.7	
Green	Peter Edwards	67	3.4	
Majority		335	17.1	
Turnout		1,959		
Liberal Democrats hold		Swing		

Linford South
Party	Candidate	Votes	%	±%
Liberal Democrats	Christine Tilley	712	43.7	
Labour	Gladstone McKenzie	603	37.0	
Conservative	Donald Hoyle	248	15.2	
Green	Clive Bailey	68	4.2	
Majority		109	6.7	
Turnout		1,631		
Liberal Democrats hold		Swing		

Loughton Park
Party	Candidate	Votes	%	±%
Labour	Brian Gibbs	1,188	45.0	
Conservative	Andrew Dransfield	1,155	43.8	
Liberal Democrats	Isabella Fraser	296	11.2	
Majority		33	1.3	
Turnout		2,639		
Labour hold		Swing		

Ouse Valley
Party	Candidate	Votes	%	±%
Conservative	John Ellis	659	58.7	
Liberal Democrats	John Whistlecraft	385	34.3	
Labour	David Jones	78	7.0	
Majority		274	24.4	
Turnout		1,122		
Conservative hold		Swing		

Sherington
Party	Candidate	Votes	%	±%
Liberal Democrats	Patricia Seymour	786	63.9	
Conservative	Henry Powell-Shedden	388	31.5	
Labour	Ann Kirby	57	4.6	
Majority		398	32.3	
Turnout		1,231		
Liberal Democrats hold		Swing		

Stantonbury
Party	Candidate	Votes	%	±%
Labour	Brian Morsley	963	53.1	
Conservative	Roy Miller	541	29.9	
Liberal Democrats	Robert Exon	244	13.5	
Green	Carol Barac	64	3.5	
Majority		422	23.3	
Turnout		1,812		
Labour gain from Conservative		Swing		

Stony Stratford
Party	Candidate	Votes	%	±%
Labour	Michael Pendry	1,240	46.8	
Conservative	Amanda Box	1,227	46.3	
Liberal Democrats	Jean Mooney	185	7.0	
Majority		13	0.5	
Turnout		2,652		
Labour hold		Swing		

Walton Park
Party	Candidate	Votes	%	±%
Liberal Democrats	Ian Nuttall	1,182	63.7	
Conservative	Cherilyn Williams	370	19.9	
Labour	Arun Vaidyanathan	304	16.4	
Majority		812	43.8	
Turnout		1,856		
Liberal Democrats hold		Swing		

Wolverton
Party	Candidate	Votes	%	±%
Labour	Norman Miles	1,115	59.9	
Conservative	Peter Davies	363	19.5	
Liberal Democrats	Michael Chapman	198	10.6	
Green	Alan Francis	185	9.9	
Majority		752	40.4	
Turnout		1,861		
Labour hold		Swing		

Woughton
Party	Candidate	Votes	%	±%
Labour	Stephen Coventry	1,217	63.0	
Conservative	William Kenyon	437	22.6	
Liberal Democrats	Kenneth Otter	278	14.4	
Majority		780	40.4	
Turnout		1,932		
Labour hold		Swing		
