= 2015 Milton Keynes Council election =

2015 UK local government election

The 2015 Milton Keynes Council election took place on 7 May 2015 to elect members of Milton Keynes Council in England. This was on the same day as other local elections.

== Council make up ==
After the 2015 local election, the political make up of the council was as follows:

Party	Number of councillors
Labour	23
Conservative	22
Liberal Democrats	12
UKIP	0
Green	0
Independent	0

== Ward results ==
Bletchley East
Party	Candidate	Votes	%	±%
Labour	Carole Baume	2,105	36.3	
Conservative	Michael Somerton	1,950	33.6	
UKIP	Vince Peddle	1,203	20.7	
Green	Michael Sheppard	304	5.2	
Liberal Democrats	Ian Nuttall	239	4.1	
Turnout				

Bletchley Park
Party	Candidate	Votes	%	±%
Conservative	Ann Clancy	2,879	40.3	
Labour	Elaine Wales	2,291	32.1	
UKIP	Adrian Pitfield	1,231	17.2	
Liberal Democrats	Susan Burke	372	5.2	
Green	Sam Pancheri	371	5.2	
Turnout				

Bletchley West
Party	Candidate	Votes	%	±%
Conservative	Maggie Geaney	2,610	37	
Labour	Moriah Priestley	2,246	31.9	
UKIP	Bill Smith	1,354	19.2	
Green	Liz Campbell	472	6.7	
Liberal Democrats	Alfred Vella	366	5.2	
Turnout				

Bradwell
Party	Candidate	Votes	%	±%
Liberal Democrats	Robin Bradburn	2,032	32.8	
Labour	Rachel Pallett	1,779	28.7	
Conservative	Max Chaudhry	1,262	20.4	
UKIP	Cathy Kitchiner	801	13	
Green	Rachel Cadger	253	4.1	
TUSC	Katie Simpson	64	1	
Turnout				

Broughton
Party	Candidate	Votes	%	±%
Conservative	Catriona Morris	2,497	46	
Liberal Democrats	Kerrie Bradburn	1,652	30.4	
Labour	Ruth Cover	993	18.3	
Green	Katrina Deacon	296	5.4	
Turnout				

Campbell Park and Old Woughton
Party	Candidate	Votes	%	±%
Conservative	Peter McDonald	2,147	33.4	
Liberal Democrats	Rosemary Snell	1,801	28	
Labour	David Wangusi	1,399	21.7	
UKIP	Zelia Izydorczyk	593	9.2	
Green	Alexander Chapman	454	7.1	
Independent	David Priest	41	0.6	
Turnout				

Central Milton Keynes
Party	Candidate	Votes	%	±%
Labour	Paul Williams	2,209	43.2	
Conservative	Terry Baines	1,606	31.4	
Liberal Democrats	Marie Bradburn	634	12.4	
Green	Ashley Allen	470	9.2	
Independent	Darron Kendrick	194	3.8	
Turnout				

Danesborough and Walton
Party	Candidate	Votes	%	±%
Conservative	Alice Bramall	3,719	58.4	
Labour	Ellen Goodwin	1,567	24.6	
Liberal Democrats	Russell Houchin	587	9.2	
Green	Jonathan Ridgway	498	7.8	
Turnout				

Loughton and Shenley (3)
Party	Candidate	Votes	%	±%
Conservative	Andy Dransfield	3,283	47.8	
Labour	David Prendergast	2,026	29.5	
UKIP	David Reilly	721	10.5	
Liberal Democrats	Edis Bevan	448	6.5	
Green	Keri Edmonds	392	5.7	
Turnout				

Monkston
Party	Candidate	Votes	%	±%
Conservative	Andrew Buckley	2,373	42.7	
Liberal Democrats	Matt Drewett	1,486	26.7	
Labour	Kathryn Colgrave	1,326	23.9	
Green	William Leahy	373	6.7	
Turnout				

Newport Pagnell North and Hanslope
Party	Candidate	Votes	%	±%
Conservative	Lynn Patey-Smith	3,476	49.9	
Labour	Kacper Sidorowicz	1,064	15.3	
Liberal Democrats	Jane Carr	1,028	14.8	
UKIP	Brian Monro	988	14.2	
Green	Carol Barac	411	5.9	
Turnout				

Newport Pagnell South
Party	Candidate	Votes	%	±%
Liberal Democrats	Derek Eastman	2,328	36.5	
Conservative	Chris Wardle	1,938	30.4	
Labour	Paul Day	1,006	15.8	
UKIP	Richard Shaw	765	12	
Green	Peter Edwards	334	5.2	
Turnout				

Olney
Party	Candidate	Votes	%	±%
Conservative	David Hosking	4,359	59.2	
Labour	Dee Bethune	1,261	17.1	
UKIP	Dana Green	835	11.3	
Liberal Democrats	Tony Oyakhire	477	6.5	
Green	Catherine Rose	430	5.8	
Turnout				

Shenley Brook End
Party	Candidate	Votes	%	±%
Conservative	Hiten Ganatra	2,097	34.1	
Liberal Democrats	Stuart Burke	1,796	29.2	
Labour	Binta Bah-Pokawa	1,262	20.6	
UKIP	Geoffrey Winter	672	11	
Green	Michael Gurner	315	5.1	
Turnout				

Stantonbury
Party	Candidate	Votes	%	±%
Conservative	Alex Walker	2,258	32.2	
Labour	Martin Petchey	2,198	31.3	
UKIP	Anthony Pierson	1,217	17.3	
Liberal Democrats	Bob Benning	762	10.9	
Green	Jennifer Marklew	587	8.4	
Turnout				

Stony Stratford
Party	Candidate	Votes	%	±%
Conservative	Denise Brunning	2,208	40.8	
Labour	Arshad Majid	1,543	28.5	
UKIP	Philip Blowfield	767	14.2	
Green	Ellie Spear	669	12.4	
Liberal Democrats	Paul Bailey	226	4.2	
Turnout				

Tattenhoe
Party	Candidate	Votes	%	±%
Conservative	Geetha Morla	2,618	52.2	
Labour	Sue Sullivan	1,338	26.7	
UKIP	Leslie Ive	522	10.4	
Liberal Democrats	Valerie Menzies	318	6.3	
Green	Andrew Pancheri	223	4.4	
Turnout				

Wolverton
Party	Candidate	Votes	%	±%
Labour	Peter Marland	2,474	37.1	
Conservative	Shouket Mirza	1,861	27.9	
UKIP	Ronen Ghose	1,050	15.8	
Green	Alan Francis	751	11.3	
Liberal Democrats	Masood Jehangir	417	6.3	
Left Unity	Ann Parker	113	1.7	
Turnout				

Woughton and Fishermead
Party	Candidate	Votes	%	±%
Labour	Kevin Wilson	3,051	53.8	
Conservative	Anthony Tull	1,059	18.7	
UKIP	Kenny Oshodi	1,002	17.7	
Green	Bassam Jundi	322	5.7	
Liberal Democrats	Donna Platt	236	4.2	
Turnout				
