= 2018 Milton Keynes Council election =

2018 UK local government election

- 3 May 2018

20 of 57 seats (One third and one by-election) to Milton Keynes Council 29 seats needed for a majority
- Turnout: 33.1% (▼0.6%)
	First party	Second party	Third party
Leader	Alex Walker	Peter Marland	Douglas McCall
Party	Conservative	Labour	Liberal Democrats
Leader's seat	Stantonbury	Wolverton	Newport Pagnell South
Last election	5 seats, 34.4%	10 seats, 35.6%	5 seats, 19.8%
Seats before	22	22	13
Seats won	6	8	6
Seats after	24	21	12
Seat change	▲2	▼1	▼1
Popular vote	25,172	23,997	11,453
Percentage	39.1%	37.3%	17.8%
Swing	▲4.7%	▲1.7%	▼2.0%
	Fourth party	Fifth party	Sixth party
Leader	Unknown	David Tavener	Darron Kendrick
Party	Green	UKIP	Independent
Leader's seat	Unknown (Unelected)	Stony Stratford (Unelected)	Central Milton Keynes (Unelected)
Last election	0 seats, 1.57%	0 seats, 8.02%	0 seats, 0.3%
Seats before	0	0	0
Seats won	0	0	0
Seats after	0	0	0
Seat change	0	0	0
Popular vote	3,284	394	69
Percentage	4.89%	0.59%	0.1%
Swing	▲3.32%	▼7.43%	▼0.2%
- Map of results of 2018 election
Leader of the Council before election
Peter Marland (Labour)
No Overall Control
Leader of the Council after election
Peter Marland (Labour)
No Overall Control

The 2018 Milton Keynes Council election took place on 3 May 2018 to elect members of Milton Keynes Council in England. This election was held on the same day as other local elections.

After the election, the composition of the council was:

Party	Seats	±
Conservative	24	▲2
Labour	21	▼1
Liberal Democrat	12	▼1
Source: BBC

== Election results ==
=== Overall election result ===
Overall result compared with 2016.

Milton Keynes Council election result, 2018 (Note: % of total refers to % of wards won.)
Party	Candidates						Votes		
Party	Stood	Elected	Gained	Unseated	Net	% of total	%	No.	Net %
Conservative	20	6	3	1	▲2	31.6	39.1	25,172	▲4.7
Labour	20	8	1	2	▼1	42.1	37.3	23,997	▲1.7
Liberal Democrats	20	6	0	1	▼1	26.3	17.8	11,453	▼2.0
Green	19	0	0	0	Steady	0.0	5.1	3,284	▲3.5
UKIP	4	0	0	0	Steady	0.0	0.6	394	▼7.7
Independent	1	0	0	0	Steady	0.0	0.1	69	▼0.2

== Ward results ==
Bletchley East
Party	Candidate	Votes	%	±%
Labour	Mohammed Khan	1,483	47.8	+0.6
Conservative	Angela Kennedy	1,218	39.2	+9.6
Green	Jo Breen	249	8.0	N/A
Liberal Democrats	Stephen Clark	154	5.0	−1.0
Turnout		3,112	27.00	−3.05
Labour hold		Swing		

Bletchley Park
Party	Candidate	Votes	%	±%
Conservative	Allan Rankine	1,943	46.0	+10.7
Labour	Gladstone McKenzie	1,888	44.7	+4.3
Green	Joe French	210	5.0	N/A
Liberal Democrats	Kerrie Bradburn	182	4.3	−1.7
Turnout		4,235	36.79	+0.87
Conservative gain from Labour		Swing		

Bletchley West
Party	Candidate	Votes	%	±%
Labour	Mick Legg	1,797	49.2	+4.6
Conservative	Kevin Geaney	1,482	40.6	+7.8
Liberal Democrats	Matt Drewett	203	5.6	+0.1
Green	Michael Sheppard	167	4.6	N/A
Turnout		3,672	33.30	−2.38
Labour hold		Swing		

Bradwell
Party	Candidate	Votes	%	±%
Liberal Democrats	Rex Exon	1,666	47.5	−2.9
Labour	Stephen Brown	1,214	34.6	−2.5
Conservative	Krishna Panthula	529	15.1	+2.5
Green	Brent Johnston	97	2.8	N/A
Turnout		3,512	35.56	−3.79
Liberal Democrats hold		Swing		

Broughton
Party	Candidate	Votes	%	±%
Liberal Democrats	Sam Crooks	1,398	41.2	+2.7
Conservative	John Baker	1,202	35.4	−10.9
Labour	Ola Oladoye	620	18.3	+3.1
Green	Alexander Price	171	5.0	N/A
Turnout		3,397	30.85	−4.71
Liberal Democrats hold		Swing		

Campbell Park & Old Woughton
Party	Candidate	Votes	%	±%
Conservative	Terry Baines	1,453	37.2	+6.0
Liberal Democrats	Edward Morello	1,278	32.8	−9.0
Labour	George Arnold	1,000	25.6	+5.6
Green	Carol Barac	170	4.4	N/A
Turnout		3,907	38.71	−0.54
Conservative gain from Liberal Democrats		Swing		

Central Milton Keynes
Party	Candidate	Votes	%	±%
Labour	Moriah Priestley	1,419	53.2	−0.2
Conservative	Tubo Uranta	704	26.4	−1.0
Liberal Democrats	Leo Montague	288	10.8	−0.7
Green	Ken Baker	186	7.0	N/A
Independent	Darron Kendrick	69	2.6	−5.1
Turnout		2,671	25.74	−1.19
Labour hold		Swing		

Danesborough & Walton
Party	Candidate	Votes	%	±%
Conservative	David Hopkins	1,883	61.4	−2.0
Labour	David Cockfield	667	21.7	−2.1
Green	Peter Skelton	266	8.7	N/A
Liberal Democrats	Florence Montague	252	8.2	−4.6
Turnout		3,072	32.68	−
Conservative hold		Swing		

Loughton & Shenley
Party	Candidate	Votes	%	±%
Conservative	Dan Gilbert	1,887	47.3	+5.3
Labour	Carole Baume	1,683	42.2	−9.6
Liberal Democrats	Lisa French	240	6.0	−0.2
Green	Gill Kirkup	179	4.5	N/A
Turnout		3,998	38.58	−0.42
Conservative gain from Labour		Swing		

Monkston
Party	Candidate	Votes	%	±%
Liberal Democrats	Jenni Ferrans	1,416	51.6	+3.7
Conservative	Jaime Tamagnini	651	23.7	−8.8
Labour	Vikas Chandra	584	21.3	+1.8
Green	Lawrence Morgan	94	3.4	N/A
Turnout		2,754	29.51	−1.98
Liberal Democrats hold		Swing		

Newport Pagnell North & Hanslope
Party	Candidate	Votes	%	±%
Conservative	Andrew Geary	2,081	58.9	+11.1
Labour	Nick Phillips	739	20.9	+0.1
Liberal Democrats	Eva Griffin	499	14.1	−4.5
Green	Hilarie Bowman	112	3.2	N/A
UKIP	Ruth Birrell	101	2.9	−10.0
Turnout		3,542	35.79	+0.74
Conservative hold		Swing		

Newport Pagnell South
Party	Candidate	Votes	%	±%
Liberal Democrats	Paul Alexander	1,533	48.4	−6.0
Liberal Democrats	Jane Carr	1,433	45.2	−9.2
Conservative	David Edwards	858	27.1	+7.2
Conservative	Philip Wharton	753	23.8	+3.9
Labour	Paul Day	637	20.1	+4.6
Labour	Natasha Huckle	628	19.8	+4.3
Green	Keri Edmonds	151	4.8	N/A
UKIP	Nigel Birrell	91	2.9	−7.3
Turnout		3,173	34.30	−1.78
Liberal Democrats hold		Swing		
Liberal Democrats hold		Swing		

Olney
Party	Candidate	Votes	%	±%
Conservative	Peter Geary	2,209	64.0	+6.5
Labour	Dee Bethune	779	22.6	−0.2
Liberal Democrats	Tony Oyakhire	205	5.9	+0.9
Green	Catherine Rose	178	5.2	+0.5
UKIP	Dana Green	81	2.3	−7.7
Turnout		3,455	35.62	+3.21
Conservative hold		Swing		

Shenley Brook End
Party	Candidate	Votes	%	±%
Liberal Democrats	Andy Reilly	1,116	36.3	+0.9
Conservative	Knowledge Mpofu	1,079	35.1	+3.1
Labour	Kashif Raza	705	22.9	−
Green	Helen Den Dulk	174	5.7	N/A
Turnout		3,087	31.51	−0.24
Liberal Democrats hold		Swing		

Stantonbury
Party	Candidate	Votes	%	±%
Labour	Hannah Minns	2,003	47.5	+5.9
Conservative	Stuart Tomlin	1,659	39.3	+2.9
Liberal Democrats	Alan Mallyon	384	9.1	−2.7
Green	Peter Edwards	172	4.1	−6.2
Turnout		4,228	36.41	−2.59
Labour hold		Swing		

Stony Stratford
Party	Candidate	Votes	%	±%
Labour	Jennifer Marklew	1,940	52.0	+9.1
Conservative	Graham Russell	1,378	36.9	+1.0
Liberal Democrats	Richard Greenwood	154	4.1	−5.0
Green	Lucy Bjorck	140	3.8	N/A
UKIP	David Tavener	121	3.2	−9.0
Turnout		3,744	40.76	−1.21
Labour hold		Swing		

Tattenhoe
Party	Candidate	Votes	%	±%
Labour	Anthony Brown	1,290	47.3	+10.9
Conservative	Jenny Richards	1,249	45.8	−1.7
Liberal Democrats	Kathleen Greenwood	114	4.2	−3.0
Green	Peter Hughes	76	2.8	N/A
Turnout		2,740	33.20	+7.47
Labour gain from Conservative		Swing		

Wolverton
Party	Candidate	Votes	%	±%
Labour	Robert Middleton	1,906	54.2	−4.4
Conservative	Qasim Awan	1,055	30.0	+10.5
Green	Alan Francis	314	8.9	−5.3
Liberal Democrats	Thais Portilho	240	6.8	−0.9
Turnout		3,524	31.50	+1.05
Labour hold		Swing		

Woughton & Fishermead
Party	Candidate	Votes	%	±%
Labour	Shammi Akter	1,643	63.1	−2.6
Conservative	David Priest	652	25.0	+12.0
Green	Simon Jackson	178	6.8	N/A
Liberal Democrats	Rebecca Verkade-Cave	131	5.0	+0.9
Turnout		2,617	22.72	−4.57
Labour hold		Swing		
