= 2003 Milton Keynes Council election =

2003 UK local government election

The 2003 Milton Keynes Council election took place on 1 May 2003 to elect members of Milton Keynes Unitary Council in Buckinghamshire, England. One third of the council was up for election and the Liberal Democrats stayed in overall control of the council.

After the election, the composition of the council was:

- Liberal Democrat 27
- Labour 16
- Conservative 7
- Independent 1

== Election result ==
Milton Keynes local election result 2003
Party	Seats	Gains	Losses	Net gain/loss	Seats %	Votes %	Votes	+/−
Liberal Democrats	9	0	0	0	52.9	30.5	10,985	-6.4%
Conservative	4	0	0	0	23.5	33.1	11,900	+4.8%
Labour	4	0	0	0	23.5	29.6	10,630	-2.2%
UKIP	0	0	0	0	0	2.9	1,049	+2.3%
Green	0	0	0	0	0	2.1	770	+0.7%
Independent	0	0	0	0	0	1.8	633	+0.8%

== Ward results ==
Bletchley and Fenny Stratford
Party	Candidate	Votes	%	±%
Labour	Antony Mabbott	1,813	50.6	
Conservative	Roger Jacobs	1,048	29.2	
Independent	Daniel Galvin	357	10.0	
Liberal Democrats	Vanessa McPake	294	8.2	
UKIP	Alison Phillips	71	2.0	
Majority		765	21.4	
Turnout		3,583	40.1	−0.2
Labour hold		Swing		

Bradwell
Party	Candidate	Votes	%	±%
Liberal Democrats	Robert Exon	1,058	42.1	
Labour	Claudine Elliott	825	32.8	
Conservative	William Clark	418	16.6	
Green	Manfred Ambrosius	109	4.3	
UKIP	Robert Willsher	105	4.2	
Majority		233	9.3	
Turnout		2,515	27.5	−7.3
Liberal Democrats hold		Swing		

Campbell Park
Party	Candidate	Votes	%	±%
Liberal Democrats	Roger Tallack	1,094	48.2	
Labour	Martin Petchey	643	28.3	
Conservative	Gordon Scott-Morris	409	18.0	
UKIP	Michael Maylam	124	5.5	
Majority		451	19.9	
Turnout		2,270	22.6	−1.8
Liberal Democrats hold		Swing		

Danesborough
Party	Candidate	Votes	%	±%
Conservative	David Hopkins	967	74.0	−1.1
Labour	Brenda Jarvis	117	9.0	−0.2
Liberal Democrats	Edis Bevan	96	7.3	−0.9
Green	George Richardson	93	7.1	+2.3
UKIP	Christopher Tett	34	2.6	−0.1
Majority		850	65.0	−0.9
Turnout		1,307	40.5	−2.3
Conservative hold		Swing		

Emerson Valley
Party	Candidate	Votes	%	±%
Liberal Democrats	Rosemary Drewett	1,089	55.8	
Conservative	Geoffrey Ealden	448	23.0	
Labour	Elaine Wales	414	21.2	
Majority		641	32.8	
Turnout		1,951	23.0	−4.7
Liberal Democrats hold		Swing		

Furzton
Party	Candidate	Votes	%	±%
Liberal Democrats	Christopher Williams	846	50.4	
Conservative	Alexander Swanson	457	27.2	
Labour	Colin Lund	375	22.3	
Majority		389	23.2	
Turnout		1,678	27.7	−9.3
Liberal Democrats hold		Swing		

Hanslope Park
Party	Candidate	Votes	%	±%
Conservative	Andrew Geary	1,203	78.1	+28.5
Liberal Democrats	Anthony Pilcher	151	9.8	+2.6
Labour	Donna Coventry	131	8.5	−0.6
UKIP	Michael Phillips	55	3.6	+3.6
Majority		1,052	68.3	+52.9
Turnout		1,540	47.9	−6.3
Conservative hold		Swing		

Linford North
Party	Candidate	Votes	%	±%
Liberal Democrats	Alan Pugh	883	43.3	
Conservative	Stephen Conlan	513	25.2	
Labour	Ernest Billups	450	22.1	
Green	Peter Edwards	113	5.5	
UKIP	Helen Davies	78	3.8	
Majority		370	18.1	
Turnout		2,037	31.1	−3.5
Liberal Democrats hold		Swing		

Linford South
Party	Candidate	Votes	%	±%
Liberal Democrats	Christopher Eaton	711	45.2	
Conservative	Catriona Morris	348	22.1	
Labour	Ilhan Unsal	330	21.0	
Green	Clive Bailey	124	7.9	
UKIP	Christopher Shaw	61	3.9	
Majority		363	23.1	
Turnout		1,574	25.3	−4.1
Liberal Democrats hold		Swing		

Loughton Park
Party	Candidate	Votes	%	±%
Conservative	Ruth Jury	1,045	43.7	
Labour	Victoria Walley	645	27.0	
Liberal Democrats	John Napper	346	14.5	
Independent	Neil Cawley	276	11.5	
UKIP	Ruth Davies	79	3.3	
Majority		400	16.7	
Turnout		2,391	27.5	−5.9
Conservative hold		Swing		

Middleton
Party	Candidate	Votes	%	±%
Liberal Democrats	Derek Eastman	671	44.1	
Conservative	David Bint	541	35.6	
Labour	Alan Roberts	181	11.9	
Green	Katrina Topping	86	5.7	
UKIP	Henry Hulse	41	2.7	
Majority		130	8.5	
Turnout		1,520	28.6	−3.9
Liberal Democrats hold		Swing		

Sherington
Party	Candidate	Votes	%	±%
Liberal Democrats	Patricia Seymour	893	50.3	−7.8
Conservative	Peter Geary	750	42.2	+6.4
Labour	William Bethune	99	5.6	−0.5
UKIP	Judith Green	35	2.0	+2.0
Majority		143	8.0	−14.3
Turnout		1,777	54.9	+2.0
Liberal Democrats hold		Swing		

Stantonbury
Party	Candidate	Votes	%	±%
Labour	Michael Pendry	1,103	41.1	
Conservative	David Tunney	735	27.4	
Liberal Democrats	William Watts	703	26.2	
Green	Carol Barac	144	5.4	
Majority		368	13.7	
Turnout		2,685	39.7	+8.7
Labour hold		Swing		

Stony Stratford
Party	Candidate	Votes	%	±%
Conservative	Brinley Carstens	1,360	47.2	
Labour	David Lewis	855	29.7	
Liberal Democrats	John Whistlecraft	405	14.0	
UKIP	Clive Davies	263	9.1	
Majority		505	17.5	
Turnout		2,883	31.4	−6.7
Conservative hold		Swing		

Walton Park
Party	Candidate	Votes	%	±%
Liberal Democrats	Clive Carruthers	1,088	46.1	
Conservative	Paul White	725	30.7	
Labour	John Colbert	443	18.8	
UKIP	Donald Whiteley	103	4.4	
Majority		363	15.4	
Turnout		2,359	25.0	+0.2
Liberal Democrats hold		Swing		

Wolverton
Party	Candidate	Votes	%	±%
Labour	Janet Irons	1,140	47.1	
Conservative	Geoffrey Cavender	579	23.9	
Liberal Democrats	Peter Rackliff	399	16.5	
Green	Alan Francis	303	12.5	
Majority		561	23.2	
Turnout		2,421	23.9	−2.8
Labour hold		Swing		

Woughton
Party	Candidate	Votes	%	±%
Labour	Stephen Coventry	1,066	63.5	
Conservative	Nicholas Flaherty	354	21.1	
Liberal Democrats	Eric Cooper	258	15.4	
Majority		712	42.4	
Turnout		1,678	23.8	−0.5
Labour hold		Swing		
