= 2021 Milton Keynes Council election =

2021 UK local government election

← 2019	6 May 2021	2022 →

19 of 57 seats (One third) & 2 by-elections to Milton Keynes Council 29 seats needed for a majority
- Turnout: TBD
	First party	Second party
Leader	Alex Walker	Peter Marland
Party	Conservative	Labour
Leader's seat	Stantonbury	Wolverton
Seats before	19	23
Seats won	11	7
Seats after	23	21
Seat change	+4	-2
	Third party	Fourth party
Leader	Douglas McCall
Party	Liberal Democrats	Green
Leader's seat	Newport Pagnell South	No seats
Seats before	15	0
Seats won	3
Seats after	13
Seat change	-2
- Map showing the results of the 2021 Milton Keynes Council election
Council control before election
No Overall Majority
Council control after election
TBD

The 2021 Milton Keynes Council election took place May 6 to elect members of Milton Keynes Council in England. This was on the same day as other local elections.

One third of the council was up for election, plus two by-elections following resignations in the Central Milton Keynes and Woughton and Fishermead wards.

== Results summary ==
=== Seats up for election ===
Council Ward	Councillor	Party	Start of term
Bletchley East	Martin Gowans	Labour	2016
Bletchley Park	Elaine Wales	Labour	2016
Bletchley West	Nigel Long	Labour	2016
Bradwell	Marie Bradburn	Lib Dem	2016
Broughton	John Bint	Conservative	2016
Campbell Park & Old Woughton	Ric Brackenbury	Lib Dem	2016
Central Milton Keynes	Pauline Wallis	Labour	2016
Central Milton Keynes	Paul Williams	Labour	2019
Danesborough & Walton	Victoria Hopkins	Conservative	2016
Loughton & Shenley	Zoe Nolan	Labour	2016
Monkston	Vanessa McPake	Lib Dem	2016
Newport Pagnell North & Hanslope	Bill Green	Conservative	2016
Newport Pagnell South	Douglas McCall	Lib Dem	2016
Olney	Keith McLean	Conservative	2016
Shenley Brook End	Peter Cannon	Lib Dem	2016
Stantonbury	Martin Petchey	Labour	2016
Stony Stratford	Charlie Wilson-Marklew	Labour	2016
Tattenhoe	Gerald Small	Conservative	2016
Wolverton	Norman Miles	Labour	2016
Woughton & Fishermead	Hannah O'Neill	Labour	2016
Woughton & Fishermead	Shammi Akter	Labour	2018

=== Results ===
2021 Milton Keynes Council election
Party	This election			Full council			This election		
Party	Seats	Net	Seats %	Other	Total	Total %	Votes	Votes %	+/−
Conservative	11	▲6	52.4	13	24	42.1	31,965	42.0	+7.0
Labour	7	▼4	33.3	12	19	33.3	25,863	34.0	+3.9
Liberal Democrats	3	▼2	14.3	10	13	22.8	12,331	16.2	-5.1
Independent	0	Steady	0.0	1	1	1.8	620	0.8	+0.2
Green	0	Steady	0.0	0	0	0.0	4,673	6.1	-3.7
Women's Equality	0	Steady	0.0	0	0	0.0	222	0.3	±0.0
UKIP	0	Steady	0.0	0	0	0.0	183	0.2	-2.9
Heritage	0	Steady	0.0	0	0	0.0	145	0.2	New
Reform UK	0	Steady	0.0	0	0	0.0	60	0.1	New

== Ward results ==
=== Bletchley East ===
Bletchley East
Party	Candidate	Votes	%	±%
Labour Co-op	Ed Hume	1,515	42.6	−2.9
Conservative	Shazna Muzammil	1,332	37.5	+6.7
Green	Axel Segebrecht	303	8.5	−9.8
Independent	Angela Kennedy	225	6.3	N/A
Liberal Democrats	Sean McCabe	98	2.8	−2.6
UKIP	Daniel Ribton	83	2.3	N/A
Majority		183	5.1	
Turnout		3,618	30.2	+8.0
Labour Co-op hold		Swing	▼4.8	

=== Bletchley Park ===
Bletchley Park
Party	Candidate	Votes	%	±%
Conservative	Mo Imran	2,171	50.6	+13.4
Labour	Elaine Wales	1,649	38.4	+1.6
Green	Michael Sheppard	329	7.7	−0.3
Heritage	Jane Duckworth	145	3.4	N/A
Majority		522	12.2	
Turnout		4,325	38.2	+6.3
Conservative gain from Labour		Swing	▲5.9	

=== Bletchley West ===
Bletchley West
Party	Candidate	Votes	%	±%
Conservative	Adam Rolfe	1,906	48.1	+14.0
Labour Co-op	Nigel Long	1,636	41.3	+2.8
Green	Joe French	189	4.8	−0.6
Liberal Democrats	Ben Adewale	135	3.4	−4.7
UKIP	Ray Brady	100	2.5	−11.5
Majority		270	6.8	
Turnout		3,994	37.1	+7.4
Conservative gain from Labour Co-op		Swing	▲5.6	

=== Bradwell ===
Bradwell
Party	Candidate	Votes	%	±%
Liberal Democrats	Marie Bradburn	1,813	51.9	−2.5
Labour	Craig Tildesley	740	21.2	−6.6
Conservative	Krishna Panthula	722	20.7	+9.3
Green	Simon Jackson	218	6.2	−0.2
Majority		1,073	30.7	
Turnout		3,515	36.2	+5.1
Liberal Democrats hold		Swing	▲2.1	

=== Broughton ===
Broughton
Party	Candidate	Votes	%	±%
Liberal Democrats	Uroy Clarke	1,688	42.9	−6.0
Conservative	John Hearnshaw	1,578	40.1	+6.1
Labour	James Holland	673	17.1	+5.2
Majority		110	2.8	
Turnout		3,974	31.7	+2.5
Liberal Democrats gain from Conservative		Swing	▼6.1	

=== Campbell Park & Old Woughton ===
Campbell Park & Old Woughton
Party	Candidate	Votes	%	±%
Conservative	Charlotte Hall	1,769	42.5	+5.9
Liberal Democrats	Nana Oguntola	1,452	34.9	−2.0
Labour	Stephen Brown	725	17.4	+1.5
Green	Carol Barac	213	5.1	−1.3
Majority		317	7.6	
Turnout		4,194	42.4	+6.1
Conservative gain from Liberal Democrats		Swing	▲4.0	

=== Central Milton Keynes ===
Central Milton Keynes
Party	Candidate	Votes	%	±%
Labour Co-op	Ben Nolan	1,361	44.6	−5.1
Labour	Pauline Wallis	1,243	40.7	−9.0
Conservative	Liam Andrews	890	29.2	N/A
Conservative	Adeola Adeliyi	813	26.6	N/A
Liberal Democrats	Sarah Griffiths	297	9.7	−9.5
Green	Dominic Taylor	269	8.8	−6.5
Liberal Democrats	Russell Houchin	195	6.4	−12.8
Independent	Darron Kendrick	171	5.6	−10.1
Turnout		3,051	30.0	
Labour Co-op hold		Swing		
Labour hold		Swing		

=== Danesborough & Walton ===
Danesborough & Walton
Party	Candidate	Votes	%	±%
Conservative	Victoria Hopkins	2,132	57.7	+4.6
Labour	Shanika Mahendran	722	19.6	+3.8
Green	Peter Skelton	497	13.5	−4.8
Liberal Democrats	Michael Kemp	342	9.3	−3.5
Majority		1,410	38.1	
Turnout		3,727	36.6	+5.9
Conservative hold		Swing	▲0.4	

=== Loughton & Shenley ===
Loughton & Shenley
Party	Candidate	Votes	%	±%
Labour	Zoe Nolan	2,106	48.6	+7.2
Conservative	Ethan Wilkinson	1,836	42.4	+0.1
Liberal Democrats	Garrath Green	198	4.6	−3.3
Green	Vanessa Skelton	195	4.5	−4.9
Majority		270	6.2	
Turnout		4,369	43.3	+4.7
Labour hold		Swing	▲3.6	

=== Monkston ===
Monkston
Party	Candidate	Votes	%	±%
Liberal Democrats	Vanessa McPake	1,507	52.5	−4.6
Conservative	Jaime Tamagnini	806	28.1	+7.3
Labour	Naseem Khan	555	19.4	+5.1
Majority		701	24.4	
Turnout		2,890	31.3	+4.8
Liberal Democrats hold		Swing	▼6.0	

=== Newport Pagnell North & Hanslope ===
Newport Pagnell North & Hanslope
Party	Candidate	Votes	%	±%
Conservative	Chris Wardle	2,218	56.6	+7.6
Liberal Democrats	Greg Duffield	844	21.5	+1.8
Labour	Sha Khan	635	16.2	+0.9
Women's Equality	Jane Whild	222	5.7	N/A
Majority		1,374	35.1	
Turnout		3,938	39.5	+4.7
Conservative hold		Swing	▲2.9	

=== Newport Pagnell South ===
Newport Pagnell South
Party	Candidate	Votes	%	±%
Conservative	Scot Balazs	1,523	42.2	+20.1
Liberal Democrats	Andy Carr	1,375	38.1	−15.9
Labour	Alexander Chapman	502	13.9	−1.5
Green	Holly Jones	207	5.7	−2.9
Majority		148	4.1	
Turnout		3,634	39.2	+8.9
Conservative gain from Liberal Democrats		Swing	▲18.0	

=== Olney ===
Olney
Party	Candidate	Votes	%	±%
Conservative	Keith McLean	2,795	60.1	+1.9
Labour	Dee Bethune	1,215	26.1	+9.0
Green	Catherine Rose	451	9.7	−0.3
Liberal Democrats	Tony Oyakhire	190	4.1	−4.6
Majority		1,580	34.0	
Turnout		4,708	48.2	
Conservative hold		Swing	▼3.6	

=== Shenley Brook End ===
Shenley Brook End
Party	Candidate	Votes	%	±%
Conservative	Chris Taylor	1,504	41.8	+7.4
Liberal Democrats	Peter Cannon	1,170	32.5	−0.6
Labour	David Cockfield	733	20.4	+2.7
Green	David Lewis	193	5.4	−1.2
Majority		334	9.3	
Turnout		3,624	37.5	+7.7
Conservative gain from Liberal Democrats		Swing	▲4.0	

=== Stantonbury ===
Stantonbury
Party	Candidate	Votes	%	±%
Conservative	Chantelle de Villiers	2,043	45.6	+4.7
Labour	Martin Petchey	1,868	41.6	+3.6
Green	Peter Edwards	363	8.1	−4.2
Liberal Democrats	Alan Mallyon	211	4.7	−4.1
Majority		175	4.0	
Turnout		4,520	39.8	+7.0
Conservative gain from Labour		Swing	▲0.6	

=== Stony Stratford ===
Stony Stratford
Party	Candidate	Votes	%	±%
Conservative	Joseph Hearnshaw	2,015	44.9	+7.1
Labour Co-op	Akash Nayee	1,970	41.6	+1.0
Liberal Democrats	Richard Greenwood	309	6.9	−3.0
Green	Nicholas Lloyd	297	6.6	−0.1
Majority		45	3.3	
Turnout		4,621	40.7	+4.3
Conservative gain from Labour Co-op		Swing	▲3.1	

=== Tattenhoe ===
Tattenhoe
Party	Candidate	Votes	%	±%
Conservative	Manish Verma	1,616	51.7	−0.6
Labour Co-op	Shery Delfani	1,076	34.4	+5.5
Green	Lucy Bjorck	275	8.8	−2.6
Liberal Democrats	Steven Walden	158	5.1	−2.4
Majority		540	17.3	
Turnout		3,136	36.2	+7.1
Conservative hold		Swing	▼3.1	

=== Wolverton ===
Wolverton
Party	Candidate	Votes	%	±%
Labour	Ansar Hussain	1,975	52.1	+3.4
Conservative	Jonathan Street	1,015	26.8	+1.0
Green	Alan Francis	379	10.0	−6.9
Independent	Mike Galloway	224	5.9	N/A
Liberal Democrats	Thais Portilho	141	3.7	−4.9
Reform UK	James Evans	60	1.6	N/A
Majority		960	25.3	
Turnout		3,817	34.4	+5.7
Labour hold		Swing	▲1.2	

=== Woughton & Fishermead ===
Woughton & Fishermead
Party	Candidate	Votes	%	±%
Labour	Donna Fuller	1,605	55.7	−4.7
Labour	Amber McQuillan	1,359	47.2	−13.2
Conservative	Arthur Lewis	726	25.2	+4.8
Conservative	Tatiana Vassilakis	555	19.3	−1.1
Green	Johanna Breen	295	10.2	−1.8
Liberal Democrats	Raissa Roy	156	5.4	−1.8
Liberal Democrats	Terry White	151	5.2	−2.0
Turnout		2,881	25.0	+4.3
Labour hold		Swing		
Labour hold		Swing		
