= 2022 Milton Keynes Council election =

2022 UK local government election

← 2021	5 May 2022	2023 →

19 out of 57 seats to Milton Keynes Council 29 seats needed for a majority

	First party	Second party	Third party
Party	Conservative	Labour	Liberal Democrats
Last election	24 seats, 42.0%	19 seats, 34.0%	13 seats, 16.2%
Seats won	4	9	6
Seats after	22	20	14
Seat change	▼2	▲1	▲1
Popular vote	22,750	23,734	13,796
Percentage	35.0%	36.5%	21.2%
Swing	▼7.0%	▲2.5%	▲5.0%
- Winner of each seat at the 2022 Milton Keynes Council election
Council control before election
No overall control
Council control after election
No overall control

The 2022 Milton Keynes Council election took place on 5 May 2022 to elect members of Milton Keynes Council. This was on the same day as other local elections.

One third of the council was up for election.

== Results summary ==
2022 Milton Keynes Council election
Party	This election			Full council			This election		
Party	Seats	Net	Seats %	Other	Total	Total %	Votes	Votes %	+/−
Conservative	4	▼2	21.1	18	22	38.6	22,750	35.0	-7.0
Labour	9	▲1	47.4	11	20	35.1	23,734	36.5	+2.5
Liberal Democrats	6	▲1	31.6	8	14	24.6	13,796	21.2	+5.0
Independent	0	Steady	0.0	1	1	1.8	976	1.5	+0.7
Green	0	Steady	0.0	0	0	0.0	3,607	5.5	-0.6
Women's Equality	0	Steady	0.0	0	0	0.0	214	0.3	±0.0

== Ward results ==
=== Bletchley East ===
Bletchley East
Party	Candidate	Votes	%	±%
Labour	Mohammad Khan	1,607	52.0	+9.4
Conservative	James Marlow	951	30.8	−6.7
Liberal Democrats	Sean McCabe	275	8.9	+6.1
Green	Joe French	256	8.3	−0.2
Majority		656	21.2	
Turnout		3,104	25.6	
Labour hold		Swing	▲8.1	

=== Bletchley Park ===
Bletchley Park
Party	Candidate	Votes	%	±%
Labour Co-op	Nigel Long	1,744	45.5	+7.1
Conservative	Allan Rankine	1,672	43.6	−7.0
Liberal Democrats	Sarah Griffiths	219	5.7	N/A
Green	Michael Sheppard	196	5.1	−2.6
Majority		72	1.9	
Turnout		3,842	34.5	
Labour Co-op gain from Conservative		Swing	▲7.1	

=== Bletchley West ===
Bletchley West
Party	Candidate	Votes	%	±%
Labour Co-op	Mick Legg	1,834	49.1	+7.8
Conservative	Godwin Michael	1,418	38.0	−10.1
Independent	Ray Brady	172	4.6	N/A
Liberal Democrats	Ben Adewale	167	4.5	+1.1
Green	Axel Segebrecht	141	3.8	−1.0
Majority		416	11.1	
Turnout		3,743	35.8	
Labour Co-op hold		Swing	▲9.0	

=== Bradwell ===
Bradwell
Party	Candidate	Votes	%	±%
Liberal Democrats	Rex Exon	1,769	57.7	+5.8
Labour	Shadat Khan	761	24.8	+3.6
Conservative	Krishna Panthula	535	17.5	−3.2
Majority		1,008	32.9	
Turnout		3,083	32.3	
Liberal Democrats hold		Swing	▲1.1	

=== Broughton ===
Broughton
Party	Candidate	Votes	%	±%
Liberal Democrats	Sam Crooks	1,971	51.1	+8.2
Conservative	Dev Ahuja	1,269	32.9	−7.2
Labour	Monica Dowling	615	16.0	−1.1
Majority		702	18.2	
Turnout		3,869	30.3	
Liberal Democrats hold		Swing	▲7.7	

=== Campbell Park & Old Woughton ===
Campbell Park & Old Woughton
Party	Candidate	Votes	%	±%
Liberal Democrats	Nana Oguntola	1,712	44.7	+9.8
Conservative	John Hearnshaw	1,404	36.6	−5.9
Labour	Christian Durugo	715	18.7	+1.3
Majority		308	8.1	
Turnout		3,851	39.0	
Liberal Democrats gain from Conservative		Swing	▲7.9	

=== Central Milton Keynes ===
Central Milton Keynes
Party	Candidate	Votes	%	±%
Labour	Moriah Priestley	1,365	54.2	+8.6
Conservative	Haider Imran	646	25.6	−4.1
Liberal Democrats	Russell Houchin	508	20.2	+10.2
Majority		719	12.7	
Turnout		2,545	25.1	
Labour hold		Swing	▲6.4	

=== Danesborough & Walton ===
Danesborough & Walton
Party	Candidate	Votes	%	±%
Conservative	David Hopkins	1,764	49.9	−7.8
Labour	Veronica Belcher	918	26.0	+6.4
Green	Peter Skelton	451	12.8	−0.7
Liberal Democrats	Rebecca Cave	401	11.3	+2.0
Majority		846	23.9	
Turnout		3,551	33.5	
Conservative hold		Swing	▼7.1	

=== Loughton & Shenley ===
Loughton & Shenley
Party	Candidate	Votes	%	±%
Labour Co-op	Shanika Mahendran	2,145	51.9	+3.3
Conservative	Ethan Wilkinson	1,564	37.8	−4.6
Liberal Democrats	Stephen Clark	232	5.6	+1.0
Green	Dominic Taylor	194	4.7	+0.2
Majority		581	14.1	
Turnout		4,151	41.6	
Labour Co-op gain from Conservative		Swing	▲4.0	

=== Monkston ===
Monkston
Party	Candidate	Votes	%	±%
Liberal Democrats	Jennifer Ferrans	1,540	58.0	+5.5
Conservative	Jaime Tamagnini	596	22.4	−5.7
Labour	Martin Petchey	521	19.6	+0.2
Majority		944	35.6	
Turnout		2,671	29.2	
Liberal Democrats hold		Swing	▲5.6	

=== Newport Pagnell North & Hanslope ===
Newport Pagnell North & Hanslope
Party	Candidate	Votes	%	±%
Conservative	Liam Andrews	1,655	46.8	−9.8
Labour	Carol Wood	768	21.7	+5.5
Liberal Democrats	Tony Oyakhire	653	18.5	−3.0
Green	Gary Lloyd	247	7.0	N/A
Women's Equality	Jane Whild	214	6.1	+0.4
Majority		887	25.1	
Turnout		3,555	36.2	
Conservative hold		Swing	▼7.7	

=== Newport Pagnell South ===
Newport Pagnell South
Party	Candidate	Votes	%	±%
Liberal Democrats	Andy Carr	1,620	50.5	+12.4
Conservative	Yusrah Kayani	1,068	33.3	−8.9
Labour	Stephen Brown	520	16.2	+2.3
Majority		552	17.2	
Turnout		3,233	35.8	
Liberal Democrats hold		Swing	▲10.7	

=== Olney ===
Olney
Party	Candidate	Votes	%	±%
Conservative	Peter Geary	1,620	40.3	−19.8
Green	Catherine Rose	850	21.1	+11.4
Independent	Ben Brown	804	20.0	N/A
Labour	Dee Bethune	746	18.6	−7.5
Majority		770	19.2	
Turnout		4,034	41.8	
Conservative hold		Swing	▼15.6	

=== Shenley Brook End ===
Shenley Brook End
Party	Candidate	Votes	%	±%
Liberal Democrats	Peter Cannon	1,487	46.3	+13.8
Conservative	Ade Adeliyi	1,113	34.7	−7.1
Labour	Akash Nayee	610	19.0	−1.4
Majority		374	20.9	
Turnout		3,240	33.9	
Liberal Democrats hold		Swing	▲10.5	

=== Stantonbury ===
Stantonbury
Party	Candidate	Votes	%	±%
Labour	Naseem Khan	1,840	46.2	+4.6
Conservative	Babs Wright	1,521	38.2	−7.4
Green	Peter Edwards	333	8.4	+0.3
Liberal Democrats	Greg Duffield	292	7.3	+2.6
Majority		319	8.0	
Turnout		4,007	35.9	
Labour hold		Swing	▲6.0	

=== Stony Stratford ===
Stony Stratford
Party	Candidate	Votes	%	±%
Labour	Jennifer Wilson-Marklew	2,295	52.8	+11.2
Conservative	Rajeev Sharma	1,518	34.9	−10.0
Liberal Democrats	Richard Greenwood	285	6.6	−0.3
Green	Anthony Lewis	247	5.7	−0.9
Majority		777	21.2	
Turnout		4,363	37.8	
Labour hold		Swing	▲10.6	

=== Tattenhoe ===
Tattenhoe
Party	Candidate	Votes	%	±%
Conservative	Fathima Muzammil	1,167	43.7	−8.0
Labour	Rukhsana Malik	990	37.0	+2.6
Green	Rebecca Bjorck	268	10.0	+1.2
Liberal Democrats	Steven Walden	248	9.3	+4.2
Majority		177	6.7	
Turnout		2,695	31.2	
Conservative gain from Labour		Swing	▼5.3	

=== Wolverton ===
Wolverton
Party	Candidate	Votes	%	±%
Labour Co-op	Robert Middleton	2,051	59.7	+7.6
Conservative	Jonathan Street	781	22.7	−4.1
Green	Alan Francis	424	12.4	+2.4
Liberal Democrats	Thais Portilho	177	5.2	+1.5
Majority		1,270	37.0	
Turnout		3,446	31.8	
Labour Co-op hold		Swing	▲5.9	

=== Woughton & Fishermead ===
Woughton & Fishermead
Party	Candidate	Votes	%	±%
Labour	Amber McQuillan	1,689	69.9	+12.2
Conservative	Tatiana Vassilakis	488	20.2	−5.9
Liberal Democrats	Raissa Roy	240	9.9	+4.3
Majority		1,201	49.7	
Turnout		2,437	21.3	
Labour hold		Swing	▲9.1	
