= 1954 New Year Honours =

British royal recognitions

The New Year Honours 1954 were appointments in many of the Commonwealth realms of Queen Elizabeth II to various orders and honours to reward and highlight good works by citizens of those countries. They were announced on 1 January 1954 to celebrate the year passed and mark the beginning of 1954.

The recipients of honours are displayed here as they were styled before their new honour, and arranged by honour, with classes (Knight, Knight Grand Cross, etc.) and then divisions (Military, Civil, etc.) as appropriate.

== United Kingdom ==
=== Viscount ===
- The Right Honourable Frederick James, Baron Leathers, CH, Secretary of State for the Co-ordination of Transport, Fuel & Power, 1951–1953, Minister of War Transport, 1941–1945.

=== Baron ===
- The Right Honourable Leslie Hore-Belisha, Member of Parliament for Devonport, 1923–1945; Minister of Transport, 1934–1937; Secretary of State for War, 1937–1940; Member of War Cabinet, 1939–1940; Minister of National Insurance, 1945. For political and public services.
- The Right Honourable Henry Charles Ponsonby, Earl of Drogheda, KCMG, Chairman of Committees and a Deputy Speaker in the House of Lords.
- Sir (Joseph) Stanley Holmes, MP, Member of Parliament for North-East Derbyshire, 1918–1922, and for Harwich since 1935. For political and public services.
- The Right Honourable Richard Kidston Law, MP, Member of Parliament for South-West Hull, 1931–1945, South Kensington, 1945–1950, and Haltemprice since 1950; Minister of State, Foreign Office, 1943–1945; Minister of Education, 1945. For political and public services.
- Sir William Strang, GCB GCMG MBE, lately Permanent Under-Secretary of State, Foreign Office.

=== Privy Councillor ===
- John Archibald Boyd-Carpenter, MP, Financial Secretary to HM Treasury since 1951. Member of Parliament for Kingston upon Thames since 1945.
- Sir Lionel Frederick Heald, QC MP, Attorney-General since 1951. Member of Parliament for Chertsey since 1950.
- The Honourable Keith Jacka Holyoake, Deputy Prime Minister and Minister of Agriculture & Marketing, New Zealand, since 1949.

=== Baronet ===
- Dallas Gerald Mercer Bernard, Deputy Governor of the Bank of England.
- Lieutenant-Commander Joseph Gurney Braithwaite, RNVR (Retired), MP, Member of Parliament for Hillsborough, 1931–1935, Holderness, 1939–1950, and North-West Bristol since 1950; Parliamentary Secretary, Ministry of Transport, 1951–1953.
- Captain Malcolm Bullock, MBE, Member of Parliament for the Waterloo Division, 1923–1950, and for Crosby, 1950–1953. For political and public services.
- Brigadier Harry Ripley Mackeson, MP, Member of Parliament for Hythe, 1945–1950, and for Folkestone and Hythe since 1950; Conservative Deputy Chief Whip, 1950–1952; Secretary for Overseas Trade, 1952–1953.
- Colonel Sir Joseph Nall, DSO TD JP DL, Member of Parliament for the Hulme division of Manchester, 1918–1929 and 1931–1945. For political and public services.

=== Knight Bachelor ===
- Frank Ezra Adcock, OBE, Emeritus Professor of Ancient History, University of Cambridge.
- Lieutenant-Colonel Weston Cracroft-Amcotts, MC, DL. For political and public services in Lincolnshire.
- Donald Forsyth Anderson, Chairman, Shipping Federation, and President, Chamber of Shipping of the United Kingdom.
- Arthur Lennon Binns, CBE MC, Chief Education Officer for Lancashire.
- James Clark Campbell, TD JP DL, Chairman, Savings Bank of Glasgow.
- Edward Charles Dodds, MVO MD FRCP, Courtauld Professor of Biochemistry, University of London.
- George Foster Earle, CBE, Chairman, Associated Portland Cement Manufacturers, Ltd.
- John Blumenfeld Elliot, lately Chairman, Railway Executive. Now Chairman, London Transport Executive.
- Geoffrey Cust Faber, Chairman, Faber & Faber, Ltd.
- Colonel William Charles Fenton, MC JP. For political and public services in Spen Valley, Yorkshire.
- Eric Wilfred Fish, CBE MD FDS, Chairman of the Dental Board.
- Raymond Hatherell Fooks, CBE, Chief Constable of Lincolnshire.
- George Garnett, JP. For political and public services in Bradford.
- Professor James Gray, CBE MC, Member of the Development Commission. Professor of Zoology, University of Cambridge.
- Edward Anthony Hawke, Chairman, County of London Quarter Sessions.
- Cecil George Graham Hayman, Director and Chairman of Management Committee, Distillers Company, Ltd.
- Amos Brook Hirst, OBE, Chairman of The Football Association.
- His Honour Judge James Henry Donald Hurst, Judge of County Courts.
- Lieutenant-Commander George Ian Clark Hutchison, RN (Retired), MP, Member of Parliament for West Edinburgh since 1941. For political and public services.
- Roland Jennings, JP MP, Member of Parliament for Sedgefield, 1931–1935, and for Hallam since 1939. For political and public services.
- Ernest Harry Lever, Chairman and Chief Executive, Steel Company of Wales, Ltd.
- Alderman Frank Lord, OBE JP. For political and public services in Oldham.
- Oliver Lyle, OBE. For services in promoting fuel efficiency.
- The Right Honourable William Victor McCleery, JP DL, Member of Northern Ireland Parliament since 1945; Minister of Labour & National Insurance, 1949, and Minister of Commerce, 1949–53. For political and public services in Northern Ireland.
- George Tait McGlashan, CBE, President, Association of County Councils in Scotland.
- Colonel Stuart Sydney Mallinson, CBE DSO MC JP DL. For public services in Essex.
- Herbert John Baptista Manzoni, CBE, City Engineer and Surveyor, Birmingham.
- Edward Brantwood Maufe, Architect. For services to the Imperial War Graves Commission.
- William Robertson Milne, Chairman of the General Trustees, Church of Scotland.
- Rhys Hopkin Morris, MBE QC MP, Deputy Chairman of Ways and Means, House of Commons, since 1951. Member of Parliament for Cardiganshire, 1923–1932, and for Carmarthen since 1945.
- Edward Talbot Paris, CB, Chief Scientific Adviser, Home Office.
- Walter Robert Dempster Perkins, MP, Member of Parliament for Stroud, 1931–1945, and for Stroud and Thornbury since 1950; Parliamentary Secretary, Ministry of Civil Aviation, 1945. For political and public services.
- Walter Charles Puckey, lately Deputy Controller of Supplies (Air), Ministry of Supply.
- Reuben James Pugsley, OBE JP. For political and public services in Cardiff.
- William Gordon Radley, CBE, Engineer-in-Chief, General Post Office.
- Brigadier Arthur Maxwell Ramsden, CB OBE TD DL. For political and public services in Yorkshire.
- Frederick Tavinor Rees, CBE MC TD MRCS LRCP, lately Director General of Medical Services, Ministry of Pensions.
- George Robey, CBE. Actor.
- Kenneth Duncan Lecky Sinclair, DL, Chairman, Belfast Harbour Commissioners.
- Arnold Colin Somervell, OBE JP DL. For political and public services in Westmorland.
- Charles Stuart Taylor, DL MP, Member of Parliament for Eastbourne since 1935. For political and public services.
- Douglas Veale, CBE, Registrar, University of Oxford.
- Henry George Gordon Welch, CBE, Controller, HM Stationery Office.

State of Tasmania.

- Richard Oliver Harris, CMG JP, Lord Mayor of the City of Hobart, State of Tasmania.

State of South Australia.

- Brian Herbert Swift, MC MD FRCS. In recognition of his valuable services to public hospitals and to the University of Adelaide, State of South Australia.

Commonwealth Services.

- Eric Weston, Indian Civil Service (Retired), formerly Chief Justice of the Punjab High Court of Judicature at Simla.

Colonies, Protectorates, etc.

- Edward Peter Stubbs Bell, QC, Colonial Legal Service, Chief Justice, British Guiana.
- Alfred Victor Crane, Colonial Legal Service, Chief Justice of British Honduras.
- Edward Charles Phillips, CBE. For public services in Tanganyika.
- John Owen Sanders, CMG, General Manager, Malayan Railway, and Member for Railways and Ports, Federation of Malaya.

=== Order of the Bath ===
==== Knight Grand Cross of the Order of the Bath (GCB) ====
Military Division

- Vice-Admiral Ralph Alan Bevan Edwards, CB CBE.
- Vice-Admiral Edward Malcolm Evans-Lombe, CB.
- General Sir Richard Nelson Gale, KCB KBE DSO MC (20116), late Infantry Colonel, The Worcestershire Regiment.

Civil Division

- Sir Thomas Robert Gardiner, GBE KCB. For public services.

==== Knight Commander of the Order of the Bath (KCB) ====
Military Division

- Lieutenant-General Sir Charles Falkland Loewen, KBE CB DSO (17987), late Royal Regiment of Artillery. Colonel Commandant, Royal Regiment of Artillery.
- Lieutenant-General Sir Kenneth Graeme McLean, KBE CB (15991), late Corps of Royal Engineers.
- Acting Air Marshal George Holroyd Mills, CB DFC.
- Acting Air Marshal Claude Bernard Raymond Pelly, CB CBE MC.

Civil Division

- Sir James Reginald Carroll Helmore, KCMG, Permanent Secretary, Ministry of Supply.
- Harold Simcox Kent, CB, HM Procurator General and Treasury Solicitor.
- Victor George Shepheard, CB, Director of Naval Construction, Admiralty.

==== Companion of the Order of the Bath (CB) ====
Military Division

Navy

- Rear-Admiral Geoffrey Frederick Burghard, DSO.
- Rear-Admiral Stephen Hope Carlill, DSO.
- Rear-Admiral (S) Maurice Herbert Elliott, CBE.
- Rear-Admiral Gerald Vaughan Gladstone.
- Rear-Admiral (E) Iain Gilleasbuig Maclean, OBE.
- Surgeon Rear-Admiral Robert Walsh Mussen, CBE MD BCh.
- Rear-Admiral (E) Leopold Edward Rebbeck.
- Rear-Admiral Maxwell Richmond, DSO OBE.
- Rear-Admiral Jocelyn Stuart Cambridge Salter, DSO OBE.

Army

- Major-General Thomas Brodie, CBE DSO (34236), late Infantry.
- Major-General Richard George Collingwood, CBE DSO (27169), late Infantry.
- Major-General (Temporary) John Guise Cowley, CBE AM (33330), late Corps of Royal Engineers.
- Major-General Edward Phillip Nagle Creagh, MB MRCP QHP (15621), late Royal Army Medical Corps.
- Major-General James Scott-Elliot, CBE DSO (23799), late Infantry.
- Major-General Peter St Clair-Ford, CBE DSO (33686), late Infantry.
- Brigadier Richard Gardiner, CBE (6835), late Corps of Royal Engineers (now RARO).
- Major-General Walter Rutherford Goodman, DSO MC (21258), late Royal Regiment of Artillery.
- Major-General William Ralston Duncan Hamilton, OBE MD QHP (24782), late Royal Army Medical Corps.
- Major-General Frederick Maurice Hext, OBE (18523), Corps of Royal Electrical & Mechanical Engineers.
- Major-General Stephen Lamplugh, CBE (6951), late Corps of Royal Engineers.
- Major-General (Temporary) Francis Neville Mitchell, CBE DSO (30902), late Royal Armoured Corps.
- Major-General (Acting) Joseph Harold Wilkinson, CIE (IA28), Special List (ex-Indian Army). At present on loan to the Government of India.

Air Force

- Acting Air Marshal Bryan Vernon Reynolds, CBE.
- Air Vice-Marshal Vyvyan Stewart Ewing, CBE MB ChB.
- Air Vice-Marshal John Humphrey Edwardes-Jones, CBE DFC AFC.
- Air Commodore Leslie William Clement Bower, DSO DFC.
- Air Commodore Herbert Lindsell Messiter.
- Air Commodore Francis Ronald Downs Swain, CBE AFC.
- Air Commodore Geoffrey Nicolas Ernest Tindal-Carill-Worsley, CBE.
- Acting Air Commodore Harold Frederick George Southey.

Civil Division

- Arthur Thomas Barnard, OBE, Chief Superintendent, Royal Ordnance Factories, Woolwich.
- Colonel Reginald John Cash, CBE MC TD, Chairman, County of Warwick Territorial and Auxiliary Forces Association.
- George Albert Clark, VRD MD, Principal Medical Officer, Ministry of Health.
- Commander Kenneth Cohen, CMG, RN (Retired), Foreign Office.
- Brigadier Piers Duncan Williams Dunn, CBE DSO MC, Commandant, Police College, Ryton-on-Dunsmore, near Coventry.
- Albert Jack Filer, Under-Secretary, Ministry of Works.
- John Henry Forshaw, MC, Chief Architect and Housing Consultant, Ministry of Housing and Local Government and Ministry of Health.
- Malcolm Patrick Murray, Under-Secretary, Ministry of Fuel & Power.
- Henry Michael Denne Parker, CBE, Under-Secretary, Ministry of Labour & National Service.
- Anthony Edward Percival, Under-Secretary, Board of Trade.
- Arthur Ewart Popham, Keeper of Prints & Drawings, British Museum.
- Francis Noel Roberts, CBE, Commissioner, Board of Customs and Excise.
- Charles Arthur Evelyn Shuckburgh, CMG, Private Secretary to the Secretary of State for Foreign Affairs.
- James Martin Stagg, OBE, Principal Deputy Director, Meteorological Office, Air Ministry.
- Francis Fearon Turnbull, CIE, Under-Secretary, HM Treasury.
- Herbert James Watson, Deputy Director of Dockyards, Admiralty.

=== Order of Saint Michael and Saint George ===
==== Knight Grand Cross of the Order of St Michael and St George (GCMG) ====
- Sir John Balfour, KCMG, Her Majesty's Ambassador Extraordinary and Plenipotentiary in Madrid.

==== Knight Commander of the Order of St Michael and St George (KCMG) ====
- Francis Maurice Grosvenor Glyn, Chairman, Glyn, Mills & Company.
- Robert Lowe Hall, CB, Economic Adviser to HM Government.
- Jesse John Paskin, CMG MC, Assistant Under-Secretary of State, Colonial Office.
- John Dalzell Rankine, CMG, British Resident, Zanzibar.
- Eric Alfred Berthoud, CMG, Her Majesty's Ambassador Extraordinary and Plenipotentiary in Copenhagen.
- Gerald Gray Fitzmaurice, CMG, Legal Adviser to the Foreign Office.
- Daniel William Lascelles, CMG, Her Majesty's Ambassador Extraordinary and Plenipotentiary in Kabul.
- William Ridsdale, CMG, Head of the News Department, Foreign Office.

==== Companion of the Order of St Michael and St George (CMG) ====
- Ralph Ellis Brook, OBE, Deputy Chairman, Colonial Development Corporation.
- George Sinclair Dunnett, OBE, Secretary, Commonwealth Economic Committee.
- Harry Freeman, Principal Actuary, Government Actuary's Department. For services in relation to India, Pakistan and the Colonies.
- Godfrey Michael Graham, OBE, Director of Fishery Research, Ministry of Agriculture & Fisheries.
- Ellis Charles Raymond Hadfield, Controller (Overseas), Central Office of Information.
- Francis John Marriott, Deputy Secretary, Exchequer and Audit Department. For services to Specialised Agencies of the United Nations.
- Colonel Gerald Richardson, OBE, Inspector-General of Police, Venezia Giulia Police Force and Director of Public Safety, Trieste.
- Norman Charles Robertson, MBE, Director General of Electronics Production, Ministry of Supply.
- Francis Jackson Carter, CBE JP, Under-Secretary and Clerk of the Executive Council, State of Tasmania.
- The Honourable Francis Joseph Condon, a Member of the Legislative Council, State of South Australia, for many years.
- Maurice Rupert Metcalf, OBE, an Assistant Secretary in the Commonwealth Relations Office.
- The Honourable Mr. Justice Ralph John Morton, OBE MC, Puisne Judge of the High Court, Southern Rhodesia.
- Eric Cecil Barnes, Colonial Administrative Service, Provincial Commissioner, Nyasaland.
- William Hugh Beeton, Colonial Administrative Service, Chief Regional Officer, Ashanti, Gold Coast.
- Kenneth Vincent Brown lately Puisne Judge, Trinidad.
- Ronald Paul Bush, OBE, Colonial Administrative Service, Secretary for Native Affairs, Northern Rhodesia.
- Edward Reginald Edmonds, Assistant Secretary, Colonial Office.
- Alexander Denis Garson, Assistant Secretary, Colonial Office.
- Gervas Huxley, MC, Honorary Adviser on public relations matters to the Secretary of State for the Colonies.
- Cuthbert Joseph Mayne, Colonial Administrative Service, Senior Resident, Nigeria.
- Colonel Hugh Waddell Mulligan, MD, Colonial Research Service, Director, West African Institute for Trypanosomiasis Research.
- Albert Walter Savage, Colonial Civil Aviation Service, Director General of Civil Aviation, Malaya-Borneo Region.
- Arthur Edwin Trotman, Colonial Agricultural Service, Member for Agriculture & Natural Resources, Tanganyika.
- William Venner, General Manager, Sierra Leone Railway.
- George Evan Cameron Wisdom, Colonial Administrative Service, Resident Commissioner, Malacca, Federation of Malaya.
- Arthur Charles Beaton, Deputy Civil Secretary, Sudan Government.
- Philip Broad, Political Adviser to the Commander, British/United States Zone, Free Territory of Trieste.
- Isham Peter Garran, Inspector of Her Majesty's Foreign Service Establishments.
- Austin Anthony Francis Haigh, Head of Cultural Relations Department, Foreign Office.
- Henry Arthur Frederick Hohler, Head of Northern Department, Foreign Office.
- Leonard Gibson Holliday, Counsellor (Commercial) at Her Majesty's Embassy in Berne.
- Robin William John Hooper, DSO DFC, lately Head of Personnel Department, Foreign Office. Now at Baghdad.
- Arthur Herbert Marlow, CBE, lately Her Majesty's Consul-General in Paris.
- Aubrey Niel Morgan, lately Counsellor at Her Majesty's Embassy in Washington.
- Brigadier Claud Catton Oxborrow, CBE MC (Retired), lately Temporary Assistant Secretary, Office of the Economic Adviser, Control Commission for Germany (British Element).
- Allen Price, Counsellor at Her Majesty's Embassy in Peking.
- Brigadier John Hessell Tiltman, CBE MC, Her Majesty's Embassy, Washington.

=== Royal Victorian Order ===
==== Knight Grand Cross of the Royal Victorian Order (GCVO) ====
- The Right Honourable Alfred Edward, Baron Webb-Johnson, KCVO CBE DSO TD MB FRCS.

==== Knight Commander of the Royal Victorian Order (KCVO) ====
- Captain Gerald Curteis, MVO, RN.
- Irving Blanchard Gane.
- The Right Reverend Percy Mark Herbert, Lord Bishop of Norwich.
- James McFadyen McNeill, CBE MC.

==== Commander of the Royal Victorian Order (CVO) ====
- Lieutenant-Colonel Robert Albert Glanville Bingley, DSO OBE.
- Commander Leonard James Burt, MVO, Metropolitan Police Force.
- Lady (Mary) Rachel Davidson.
- Arthur Glendinning Loveless Ives, MVO.
- Captain William Duncan Phipps, MVO, RN (Retired.)
- Wilfrid Percy Henry Sheldon, MD FRCP.
- Commander Reginald John Smith, Metropolitan Police Force.
- William Eldon Tucker, MBE TD FRCS.

==== Member of the Royal Victorian Order, 4th class (MVO) ====
- William Macdonald Ballantine.
- Squadron Leader Ronald George Churcher, DSO DFC.
- Ernest Thomas Floyd Ewin.
- Commander John Percy Pitt Michell, RN (Retired.)
- Wing Commander Roy Charles Edwin Scott, AFC.
- Reginald Norman Tyrrell, MVO.

==== Member of the Royal Victorian Order, 5th class (MVO) ====
- Frank Blunden.
- Mabel Maud Hill.
- Francis Alfred Lee.
- Superintendent Frederick Salter, Berkshire Constabulary.
- Flight Lieutenant Eric William Lamb, RAF.

==== Medal of the Royal Victorian Order (RVM) ====
- 578267 Corporal Herbert Mark Bulled, RAF.
- 571101 Corporal Oswald Hastings Carine, RAF.
- Police Sergeant Charles William Cook, Berkshire Constabulary.
- Police Sergeant Anthony Charles Rodney Christopher, Berkshire Constabulary.
- Police Constable William Fuller, Metropolitan Police Force.
- Police Constable Charles Groombridge, Metropolitan Police Force.
- Edward Highgate.
- Horace George Morgan.
- Francis Edward Ruddle.
- 1538550 Sergeant Frederick William Silvester, RAF.
- William Henry Smith.
- Detective Constable Leslie James Watts, Norfolk Constabulary.

=== Order of the British Empire ===
==== Knight Grand Cross of the Order of the British Empire (GBE) ====
Military Division

- Air Chief Marshal Sir John Wakeling Baker, KCB MC DFC ADC.

Civil Division

- Sir Gilbert McCall Rennie, KCMG MC, Governor and Commander-in-Chief, Northern Rhodesia.

==== Dame Grand Cross of the Order of the British Empire (GBE) ====
Civil Division

- The Right Honourable Margaret Diana, Countess Alexander of Tunis. For public services.

==== Knight Commander of the Order of the British Empire (KBE) ====
Military Division

Navy

- Vice-Admiral Archibald Day, CB CBE DSO.
- Rear-Admiral (L) Charles Philip Clarke, CB DSO (Retired).

Army

- Lieutenant-General Maurice Somerville Chilton, CB CBE (13379), late Royal Regiment of Artillery.
- Lieutenant-General Geoffrey Charles Evans, CB CBE DSO (12895), late Infantry.

Air Force

- Air Marshal Charles Edward Neville Guest, CB CBE.
- Air Marshal Harold Thomas Lydford, CB CBE AFC.

Civil Division

- Sir Thomas Penberthy Bennett, CBE, Chairman, Crawley Development Corporation.
- Sir Robert Bland Bird, Bt., Member of Parliament for West Wolverhampton, 1922–1929 and 1931–1945. For political and public services.
- Colonel Douglas Stephenson Branson, CB DSO MC TD DL, Chairman, Territorial and Auxiliary Forces Association, West Riding of Yorkshire.
- Jacob Epstein, Sculptor.
- Sir Ralph Wilfred Lacey, Chairman, Raw Cotton Commission.
- Leonard Percy Lord, Chairman and Managing Director, British Motor Corporation, Ltd.
- Commander Seton Steuart Crichton Mitchell, CB OBE, RN (Retired), Controller of Guided Weapons & Electronics, Ministry of Supply.
- Richard Royle Powell, CB CMG, Deputy Secretary, Ministry of Defence.
- The Right Honourable John Campbell Boot, Baron Trent, JP DL. For social and educational services.
- Edgar William Verity, CB, Deputy Chairman, Board of Inland Revenue.
- Frank Stannard Gibbs, CMG OBE, Her Majesty's Envoy Extraordinary and Minister Plenipotentiary at Manila.
- Adrian Holman, CMG MC, Her Majesty's Ambassador Extraordinary and Plenipotentiary in Havana.
- Colonel Sir Thomas Ellis Robins, DSO ED, Chairman of the Board of the Central African Rhodes Centenary Exhibition in Bulawayo, Southern Rhodesia, 1953.
- Reginald Harry Saloway, CMG CIE OBE, Colonial Administrative Service, Chief Secretary and Minister of Defence and External Affairs, Gold Coast.
- Robert Christopher Stafford Stanley, CMG OBE, High Commissioner for the Western Pacific.

==== Commander of the Order of the British Empire (CBE) ====
Military Division

Navy

- Captain (S) Arthur Percival Atwill, RN (Retired).
- Captain (S) Norman Thomas Porteous Cooper, OBE, RN.
- Captain (L) John Danvers Grossman, RN.
- Instructor Captain Hector Archibald McDonald, RN.
- Surgeon Captain Eric Thomas Sutherland Rudd, MB BCh, RN.
- Colonel Robert William Barrow Simonds, Royal Marines.

Army

- Brigadier Edward Cunliffe Cooke-Collis, DSO (24314), late Infantry.
- Brigadier (Temporary) Richard Walter Craddock, DSO MBE (47540), late Infantry.
- Brigadier (Temporary) Robert Withers Ewbank, DSO (38372), late Corps of Royal Engineers.
- Brigadier (Temporary) Stanley Reginald Garratt, OBE (32326), late Infantry.
- Colonel (now Honorary Brigadier) Richard Nigel Hanbury, OBE TD (63198), late Royal Regiment of Artillery (now TARO).
- Colonel (now Honorary Brigadier) Herbert James Dacre Lacy McGregor (17088), late Infantry (now RARO).
- Brigadier (now Major-General (Temporary)) Frederick David Moore (23670), late Royal Regiment of Artillery.
- Major-General (Temporary) Herbert MacGregor Paterson (24859), late Royal Regiment of Artillery.
- Brigadier Robert James Rosie, MB QHP (27887), late Royal Army Medical Corps.
- Brigadier (Temporary) Nigel Prior Hanson Tapp, DSO (30558), late Royal Regiment of Artillery.
- Brigadier (Temporary) Ralph Younger, DSO MC (33496), late Royal Armoured Corps.
- Brigadier Alexander Cosby Fishburn Jackson, OBE (27513), late Infantry, Commander, Caribbean Area.

Air Force

- Air Commodore Howard Ford, AFC.
- Air Commodore David Neal Roberts, OBE AFC.
- Air Commodore Campion Aubrey Rumball, OBE MRCS FRCP QHP.
- Air Commodore John Noel Tracy Stephenson.
- Group Captain William Flint Beckwith, OBE.
- Group Captain Christopher Crowley, MB BCh.
- Group Captain Kenneth Walter Godfrey Regiment.
- Group Captain Ernest Charles Kidd, OBE AFC AFM.
- Group Captain Lawrence Patrick Moore.

Civil Division

- Charles Kingsley Adams, Director, Keeper and Secretary, National Portrait Gallery.
- Douglas Alexander Allan, Director, Royal Scottish Museum.
- Roy George Douglas Allen, OBE, Professor of Statistics, University of London.
- William Allen, MBE, Assistant Secretary, Ministry of Labour & National Insurance, Northern Ireland.
- Samuel Ranulph Allsopp, MBE DL, Chairman of the Hops Marketing Board.
- Oliver Charles Barnett, OBE, Assistant Judge Advocate General.
- Charles Edward Beevers, HM Inspector of Schools (Staff Inspector, Ministry of Education).
- Charles Hubert Booth, Controller, South Western Region, Ministry of Labour & National Service.
- Daisy Caroline Bridges, RRC, Executive Secretary, International Council of Nurses.
- John Thomas Asprey Brooks, Chief Quantity Surveyor, Ministry of Works.
- Astrid Marie Stirling-Brown, BEM JP. For political and public services in Renfrewshire.
- Charles Phipps Brutton, OBE, Clerk of the Peace for Dorsetshire, and Clerk of the County Council.
- Stephen France Burman, MBE, lately Chairman, now Vice-Chairman, Board of Governors of the United Birmingham Hospitals.
- James Anderson Burnett, Divisional Road Engineer, Scotland, Ministry of Transport & Civil Aviation.
- George Thomas Bussey, Assistant Secretary, Ministry of Fuel & Power.
- Ian MacGregor Campbell, JP. For political and public services in Caithness and Sutherland.
- Norman Charles Chapling, Managing Director, Cable & Wireless, Ltd.
- Lilian Edith Charlesworth, Headmistress, Sutton Girls' High School, Surrey.
- William Stephen Chevalier, Clerk of the Metropolitan Water Board.
- Victor Frederick Clarendon, Chairman, Linen Trade Advisory Committee, Northern Ireland.
- William George Clark, MB FRCP(Ed), lately Medical Officer of Health, Edinburgh.
- Harold George Clarke, OBE, Chairman and Managing Director of the Courier Press.
- Herbert Wallis Coales, OBE MC, Deputy Chief Engineer, Ministry of Housing & Local Government.
- Ernest Arthur Cole, OBE, Commander, Metropolitan Police Force.
- George Trenchard Cox, Director, Birmingham Museum and Art Gallery.
- James Thomas Curran, MB ChB, Group Physician Superintendent, Lennox Castle and Associated Institutions, Lennoxtown, Stirlingshire.
- Arthur James Francis Danielli, OBE MC, Deputy Accountant General, Ministry of Health.
- Frank Ongley Darvall, Director General, English-Speaking Union of the British Commonwealth.
- Robert Vere Darwin, Principal, Royal College of Art.
- William Kendall Davey, Chairman, London Metal Exchange.
- Alderman Frederick William Dean, JP DL. For political and public services in St. Marylebone.
- Alderman Herbert John Salisbury Dewes, JP. For political and public services in Cheshire.
- Philip Burrington Dingle, Town Clerk of Manchester.
- Carl Frederick Dolmetsch. For services to music.
- Thomas Hall James Douglas, FRFPS FDS RCS, Chief Dental Officer, Department of Health for Scotland.
- James Patterson Duff, Chairman, Northern Ireland General Health Services Board.
- St. John de Holt Elstub, Director of Metal Division, Imperial Chemical Industries, Ltd.
- Edgar Evans, Controller, Wales, Ministry of Pensions & National Insurance.
- Walter Scott-Evans, OBE DL, Chairman, Buckinghamshire War Pensions Committee.
- Harry Eyles, OBE lately Secretary, Birmingham Chamber of Commerce.
- Thomas Ferguson, MD, Professor of Public Health, University of Glasgow.
- William Gillies Fergusson, Assistant Secretary, Ministry of Materials.
- James Brierley Firth, Director, North Western Forensic Science Laboratory, Home Office.
- Charles Montague Fletcher, MD FRCP, Physician and Senior Lecturer, Postgraduate Medical School of London.
- Peter Castle Floud, Keeper, Victoria and Albert Museum.
- John Hampden Fordham, Chief Officer, Kent Fire Brigade.
- William Lovat Fraser, JP, Chairman of Directors, Macdonald, Fraser & Company, Ltd., Perth.
- Frederick Gibberd, Architect and Town Planning Consultant.
- Paul Goldberg, Assistant Secretary, Ministry of Labour & National Service.
- Geoffrey Ernest Adair Grey, MC, Assistant Secretary, HM Treasury.
- Reginald Duncan Gwyther, MC, Senior Partner, Coode & Partners, Consulting Civil Engineers, London.
- Charles Stuart Hallinan. For political and public services in Wales and Monmouthshire.
- Eric Ronald Hamilton, Principal, Borough Road Training College.
- John Cole-Hamilton, DL. For political and public services in Ayrshire and Bute.
- Ernest William Handley, Assistant Secretary, Air Ministry.
- Brigadier Kenneth Soar Holmes, Director of Army Postal Services, War Office.
- William Charles How, MM, Deputy Chairman, New Zealand Shipping Company, Ltd., Chairman, Merchant Navy Welfare Board.
- Frank Stewart Howes, Music Critic, Lecturer, Royal College of Music.
- Major Joseph Henry Hudson, MC JP. For public services in the West Riding of Yorkshire.
- Herbert Wilson Hughes, JP, Chairman of the Warwickshire Agricultural Executive Committee.
- William Kenneth Hutchison, Chairman, South Eastern Gas Board.
- Douglas Percy Iggulden, DSO TD, Deputy Chief Valuer, Board of Inland Revenue.
- Bernard Philip Ingamells, Director of Merchant Shipbuilding & Repairs, Admiralty.
- Herbert Edgar James, Assistant Solicitor, Ministry of Agriculture & Fisheries.
- Stephen Guy Burnet James, OBE, Director, National Service Hostels Corporation.
- Major Maurice Frederick Stewart Jewell, JP DL. For public services in Worcestershire.
- Robert William Fairfield Johnston, MC TD, Assistant Secretary, Ministry of Defence.
- Edgar Mayne Keatinge, Member of Parliament for Bury St. Edmunds, 1943–45. For political and public services in Suffolk and Wessex.
- Kathleen Mary Kenyon, Lecturer in Palestinian Archaeology, University of London Institute of Archaeology.
- Clifford Robertson King, Chairman, East Midlands Electricity Board.
- Michael Arthur Lewis, Professor of History and English, Royal Naval College, Greenwich.
- Gilbert Joseph Stephen Little, GM, Assistant Engineer-in-Chief, General Post Office.
- James McConnach, Chief Constable, City Police, Aberdeen.
- Colonel Sir Basil Alexander Talbot McFarland, Bt., Chairman, County of Londonderry Territorial and Auxiliary Forces Association.
- Cecil McGivern, Controller, Television Programmes, British Broadcasting Corporation.
- Alexander William McKenzie, Assistant Secretary, Board of Trade.
- James Maxwell, General Manager, Thomas Cook & Son, Ltd.
- Alfred Henry May, OBE, Assistant Paymaster General.
- William Millward, Foreign Office.
- John Henry Nicholson, MM, Principal, University College, Hull.
- Bertie Clifford Oades, Assistant Secretary, Ministry of Pensions & National Insurance.
- Ernest Thomas Osborne, OBE, Director of Chemical Inspection, Ministry of Supply.
- Alfred George Beech Owen, OBE, Chairman and President, Darlaston Savings Committee, South Staffordshire.
- Ernest Partridge, MP, Member of Parliament for Battersea South since 1951. For political and public services in South London.
- Clement Frederick Penruddock, Secretary to the Chequers Trust.
- Joseph Hurrell Pillman, Deputy Director of Imported Cereals, Ministry of Food.
- Sydney Harvey Plumbly, Divisional Inspector, Ministry of Education.
- William Harvey Tuthill Porter, Deputy Comptroller and Accountant General, General Post Office.
- Alan Pitt Robbins, lately News Editor of The Times.
- Alderman Kathleen Ryder Runton, OBE JP. For political and public services in the West Riding of Yorkshire.
- Lieutenant-Colonel Sir Giles Edward Sebright, Bt. For political and public services in Devonshire and Hertfordshire.
- Anne Gillespie Shaw (Mrs Pirie), For services in the field of Personnel Management.
- Glencairn Alexander Byam Shaw, Director, Shakespeare Memorial Theatre, Stratford-Upon-Avon.
- Gilbert Darnley Smith, lately Chairman, Radio Industry Council. Managing Director, Bush Radio, Ltd.
- Bernard Alfred Southgate, Director, Water Pollution Research Laboratory, Department of Scientific and Industrial Research.
- Lieutenant-Commander (S) Albert William Stone, MVO MSM, RN (Retired), Chief Accountant, Privy Purse Office.
- Ernest Jack Holford-Strevens, Joint Controller for the Board of Trade and the Ministry of Supply in the North Western Region.
- Herbert Edward Thatcher, lately Assistant Secretary, Ministry of Supply.
- Gilbert Learmonth Turnbull, Deputy Chief Inspector of Taxes, Board of Inland Revenue.
- Captain George Villar, RN (Retired), General Manager, Southampton, and Director, John I. Thornycroft & Company, Ltd.
- William Wallace, Chairman, Rowntree & Company Ltd., York.
- Aubrey John Cuming Walters, Director and Secretary, British Rayon and Synthetic Fibres Federation.
- Peter Oswald Williams, Member, Development Areas Advisory Committee.
- Eric Charles Underwood Wilson, Assistant Secretary, Ministry of Food.
- Sidney William Wooldridge, Professor of Geography, University of London. For services to the Ministry of Housing & Local Government.
- Myles Dermot Norris Wyatt, Chairman, Airwork, Ltd.

- Arthur William Beamand, Representative in New York of the Westminster Bank Limited.
- William Harris-Burland, OBE TD, lately British Chairman, Combined Steel Group, Control Commission for Germany (British Element).
- Rees John Fowler, Her Majesty's Consul-General at Genoa.
- Denys Heseltine Hibbert, Director of Education, Sudan Government.
- Ronald Charles Larkins, Sub-Governor of the National Bank of Egypt.
- William Jackson Perkins, OBE MC, British subject resident in Turkey.
- Eric Guard Price, Managing Director of Messrs. Butterfield and Swire (Japan) Limited.
- John Francis Toye, Director of the British Institute in Florence.
- Brigadier James Appleby, Commissioner of the British South Africa Police, Southern Rhodesia.
- Lionel George Archer Cust, OBE, Secretary-General, The Royal Empire Society.
- Lionel Powys-Jones, Secretary for Native Affairs and Chief Native Commissioner, Southern Rhodesia.
- Colonel Cyril Mainwaring Newman, OBE MC VD, Mayor of Bulawayo, Southern Rhodesia. For public services, particularly during the Queen Mother's visit and the Central African Rhodes Centenary Exhibition.
- Arthur Willoughby Walters, OBE, Assistant Chief Secretary, Basutoland, the Bechuanaland Protectorate and Swaziland.
- Alexandra Mary Freesia, Lady Worsley, OBE. For services rendered under the auspices of the Victoria League in connection with hospitality to visitors from overseas.
- William Allan, OBE, Colonial Agricultural Service, Director of Agriculture, Mauritius.
- Cyril John Austin, OBE MB ChB, lately Medical Superintendent, Leprosy Hospital, Makogai, Fiji.
- John Logan Brown, Director of Public Works, Cyprus.
- Henry Cronly, Colonial Veterinary Service, Director of Veterinary Services and Animal Industry, Uganda.
- Anthony Montanaro Gauci, Senior Judge, Malta.
- Geoffrey Campbell Gunter, OBE. For public services in Jamaica.
- Major Albert George Keyser, DSO. For public services in Kenya.
- Kenneth Mellanby, OBE, lately Principal, University College, Ibadan, Nigeria.
- Mustapha bin Osman, MD, State Medical and Health Officer, Kedah, Federation of Malaya.
- Hugh Hargreaves Robinson. For public services in Kenya.
- John Ernest Peniston Vesey. For public services in Bermuda.
- The Right Reverend George Weld, Roman Catholic Vicar Apostolic of British Guiana and Barbados and Titular Bishop of Mallo.

Honorary

- Tengku Muhammad ibn Al-marhum Sultan Ahmad, MBE, Menteri Besar of Pahang, Federation of Malaya.
- Serwano Wofunira Kulubya, MBE, Member of Executive and Legislative Councils, Uganda.

==== Officer of the Order of the British Empire (OBE) ====
Military Division

Navy

- Commander (E) Hew Gerald Robert Binning, RN (Retired).
- Commander Malcolm Hilary Brown, DSC, RN.
- Chief Officer Eileen Myrtle Hampson, WRNS.
- Surgeon Commander John Morley Holford, MB ChB, RN.
- Commander (S) Horace Collier Lyddon, RN.
- Commander James Whaley McClelland, DSO, RN.
- Lieutenant-Colonel Peter Lawrence Norcock, Royal Marines.
- The Reverend Charles Paton, Chaplain, RN.
- Commander Aylmer Maurice Rundle, DSC, RN (Retired).
- Commander Thomas Charles Russell, RN.
- Commander (E) Douglas Percival Sparham, RN.
- Commander Allistair Tennant Wilson, VRD, RNVR.

Army

- Lieutenant-Colonel Eric Bernard Barrass, TD (53882), The West Yorkshire Regiment, Territorial Army.
- Lieutenant-Colonel Peter Lawrence Birkin, TD (45446), Royal Regiment of Artillery, Territorial Army (now TARO).
- Lieutenant-Colonel (Staff Quartermaster) Gilbert John Boustead, MBE (86766), Employed List.
- Lieutenant-Colonel (Acting) Samuel Eyre Bower (332245), Army Cadet Force.
- Lieutenant-Colonel Alfred John Burgess, TD (92730), Corps of Royal Electrical & Mechanical Engineers, Territorial Army.
- Lieutenant-Colonel Thomas Peirce Butler, DSO (53159), Grenadier Guards.
- Lieutenant-Colonel John Cameron, TD (45192), Royal Regiment of Artillery, Territorial Army (now TARO).
- Lieutenant-Colonel David Archibald Campbell, TD (87635), Royal Regiment of Artillery, Territorial Army.
- Lieutenant-Colonel John Keily Cantopher, GM TD (73931), The Royal Ulster Rifles, Territorial Army.
- Brevet Colonel Alfred John Chaston, MC TD (71593), The Monmouthshire Regiment, Territorial Army (now TARO).
- Lieutenant-Colonel Henry Nelson Clowes, DSO (52593), Scots Guards.
- Lieutenant-Colonel Richard Stanislaus Gerrard Doyle (114135), Royal Army Ordnance Corps.
- Lieutenant-Colonel Kenneth Lawrence Elkington, MC TD (164322), Royal Regiment of Artillery, Territorial Army.
- Lieutenant-Colonel (Temporary) James Douglas Frail, MBE TD (86423), Royal Regiment of Artillery, Territorial Army (now TARO).
- Lieutenant-Colonel (Acting) Harold Maldwyn Gray, TD (19671), Combined Cadet Force.
- Lieutenant-Colonel (Acting) Geoffrey Gilbert Green (39221), Combined Cadet Force.
- Lieutenant-Colonel (Temporary) Peter Rupert Hemans (52636), Royal Regiment of Artillery.
- Lieutenant-Colonel William Howard Hooper, TD (75680), Corps of Royal Engineers, Army Emergency Reserve.
- Lieutenant-Colonel David Henry Lewis, MBE TD (66637), Royal Regiment of Artillery, Territorial Army.
- Lieutenant-Colonel John Clement Liesching (44134), The Duke of Cornwall's Light Infantry.
- Lieutenant-Colonel (Temporary) Edward Edmund George Lucas (105723), Royal Army Service Corps.
- Lieutenant-Colonel (Temporary) Mildred Sydney Frances Millington, TD (192813), Women's Royal Army Corps.
- Lieutenant-Colonel (Quartermaster) John Stevenson Mitchell (86505), Royal Corps of Signals (now Retired).
- Lieutenant-Colonel (Temporary) Alec Arthur Pettifor (249986), Royal Army Ordnance Corps.
- Lieutenant-Colonel (OEO) George Cecil Richardson, MBE (79083), Royal Army Ordnance Corps.
- Lieutenant-Colonel (Temporary) Alastair Gordon Rumbold, MC (63630), The Queen's Own Cameron Highlanders.
- Lieutenant-Colonel Joseph Augustine Sammut (37984), Royal Malta Artillery.
- Lieutenant-Colonel Frank William Simpson, DSO (44185), Corps of Royal Engineers.
- Lieutenant-Colonel Robert Edward Osborne Smith, DSO (41242), The Northamptonshire Regiment.
- Lieutenant-Colonel Donald St. Clair Thom (36891), Royal Tank Regiment, Royal Armoured Corps.
- Lieutenant-Colonel Richard Bertram Verdin, OTD (49741), The Cheshire Yeomanry (Earl of Chester's), Royal Armoured Corps, Territorial Army.
- Lieutenant-Colonel Robert William May Wetherell (30960), The Duke of Cornwall's Light Infantry.
- Lieutenant-Colonel (Temporary) Henry George Wicks (217111), Royal Regiment of Artillery.
- Lieutenant-Colonel (Temporary) Vivian Henry Witpen, MBE (142146), Army Catering Corps.
- Lieutenant-Colonel Albert Henry Wynn (168634), Corps of Royal Electrical & Mechanical Engineers.

Air Force

- Acting Group Captain Herbert Hadfield Farthing, RAF Regiment.
- Acting Group Captain Peter Geoffrey St. George O'Brian, DFC.
- Wing Commander Graham Baptie Blacklock, DFC DFM (44874).
- Wing Commander James Henry George Donald Bugden (21255).
- Wing Commander Richard Basil Councell (26049).
- Wing Commander Geoffrey Phillip Harger, DFC (36089).
- Wing Commander Harry Joseph Hickey (44632).
- Wing Officer Felicity Barbara Hill (1461), WRAF.
- Wing Commander Lewis MacDonald Hodges, DSO DFC (33408).
- Wing Commander Wilfred Macey (31019).
- Wing Commander Henry Daniel Newman (37584).
- Wing Commander Russell John Oxley, DSO DFC (37544).
- Wing Commander Paul Peters, DFC (40641).
- Wing Commander William Watson Todd Ritchie, AFC (41068).
- Wing Commander John Samuel Rowlands, GC MBE (73378).
- Wing Commander Kenneth Gordon Sharvill (82937).
- Acting Wing Commander Thomas Lightbody (105081), RAF Volunteer Reserve.
- Squadron Leader Anthony Babington Dunford, DFC (91254), RAuxAF Reserve of Officers.
- Acting Squadron Leader David Dattner, AFC (182273).

Civil Division

- Benjamin Elisha Ainley, Chairman, Middlesbrough Executive Council, National Health Service.
- Captain William Baillie, Chief Flight Captain, British European Airways.
- Thomas Humphreys Baines, Deputy Director of Radio Equipment (Production), Admiralty.
- Geoffrey Osborn Barber, MB BCh, Vice-Chairman of Committee on General Practice.
- Robert Barlow, MBE, lately General Manager, Northern Western Industrial Estates, Ltd.
- Captain John Alfred Derby Cochrane-Barnett, Alderman, West Sussex County Council, Chairman, Southern Regional Association for the Blind.
- Captain Samuel Parker Beggs, MC, Principal Officer, Ministry of Agriculture, Northern Ireland.
- John Durant Kennedy Beighton, Principal, HM Treasury.
- Thomas Bell, JP. For political and public services in Dumfries.
- Henry Norman Binns, General Manager, Great Grimsby Coal, Salt & Tanning Company, Ltd.
- Horace George Black, JP. For services as Chairman, Ellesmere Port Urban District Council, Cheshire.
- Cuthbert Geoffrey Blackford, Principal Executive Officer, Railway Liaison Staff, British Army of the Rhine, War Office.
- Clara Brakell, Chief Executive Officer, Ministry of Pensions & National Insurance.
- John Gourlay Bridges, MBE, Director General, British Travel & Holidays Association.
- Arthur John Bridgwater, District Auditor, Ministry of Housing & Local Government.
- Thomas Padgham Brindley, JP. For public services in Pontefract, West Riding of Yorkshire.
- Hugh Brown, Superintending Mechanical & Electrical Engineer, Grade II, Air Ministry.
- David Douglas Burns, Deputy Chairman, Scottish Gas Board.
- Charles Ernest Butler, Chief Constable, Grimsby Borough Police Force, Lincolnshire.
- Thomas Cyril Gwyer Butler. For political and public services in Bristol.
- Christine Eugenie Fredericka Callingham. For political and public services in Wandsworth.
- Florence Hilda Cantwell, JP. Chairman, Domestic Coal Consumers' Council.
- David Carson, Principal, Air Ministry.
- Joseph Chamberlain, Chief Engineer, Aiton & Company Ltd., Derby.
- Lyon Clark, Chairman, West Bromwich Local Employment Committee.
- Samuel Clarke, MBE, Secretary Manager, Royal Ulster Agricultural Society.
- Major William Northcoates, MC DL, Director of the Lindsey and Holland Rural Community Council, Lincolnshire.
- William Ernest Coggins, Principal, Forestry Commission.
- Captain James Cook, Master, SS Captain Cook, Donaldson Line, Ltd.
- Cyril John Shapleigh Cooke, Chief Administrative Officer, Public Trustee Office.
- William Alan Coote, County Inspector, Royal Ulster Constabulary.
- Alderman William Frederick Cottrell, Chairman, Bristol Food Control Committee.
- Edward Gordon Couzens, Director, Bexford, Ltd.
- Ernest John Cowles, Principal, Ministry of Materials.
- John Frissell Crellin, MC, Member of the Legislative Council, Isle of Man.
- Major Charles John Crocker, Foreign Office.
- Roger Kendal Gushing, Principal Scientific Officer, Ministry of Supply.
- Alfred Victor Dalzell, Secretary Director, Federated Quarry Owners of Great Britain.
- Dorothy Elizabeth, Lady Davies. For political and public services in Leeds.
- William Evan Davies, MBE, Chairman, Llanelly Savings Committee.
- Kenneth Sutton Dodd, MC, Deputy Chief Housing and Planning Inspector, Ministry of Housing & Local Government.
- Edgar Thomas Drake, Principal, Ministry of Agriculture & Fisheries.
- Tom Eccles, Vice-Chairman, North Western Regional Board for Industry.
- Joseph Edwards, Principal Officer, Ministry of Commerce, Northern Ireland.
- Ralph Crombie Erskine, Deputy Director of Sugar Division, Ministry of Food.
- Eric Christopher Carlyon Evans, MBE, Actuary, Manchester & Salford Trustee Savings Bank.
- Thomas John Evans, lately Chief Inspector, Glamorgan Local Education Authority.
- Richard Bertie Fishenden, Editor, Penrose Annual. For services to printing.
- Alderman William Brown Fitt. For political and public services in Walthamstow.
- Clarence Charles Fleetwood, Deputy Regional Controller, Ministry of Pensions & National Insurance.
- Claude Alexander Cumming Forsyth, General Secretary, Royal Scottish Society for the Prevention of Cruelty to Children.
- John Holden Fraser, Chief Officer (Signal & Telecommunications), British Transport Commission.
- John Norman Furnell, Secretary to the Admiral Superintendent, HM Dockyard, Portsmouth.
- Arthur Garrow, Deputy Secretary, Scottish Savings Committee.
- John Gavin, Chairman, Royal Blind Asylum and School, Edinburgh.
- Dennis Herbert Geffen, MD, Medical Officer of Health, St. Pancras and Hampstead.
- Mary Dorothy George. For services to the Department of Prints & Drawings, British Museum.
- Arnold William Gibson, JP, Principal, Dudley and Staffordshire Technical College.
- Peter Gilchrist, JP, Principal, Bangor Technical School, County Down.
- Alexander William Graham, Senior Architect and Surveyor, Department of Agriculture for Scotland.
- Major Benjamin Dixon Grew, Governor, HM Prison Wormwood Scrubs.
- Freda Howitt Gwilliam, Assistant Educational Adviser, Colonial Office.
- Clifford Victor Hall, Chief Officer, Durham County Fire Brigade.
- Herbert Sidney Harding, Principal Information Officer, Ministry of Health.
- Herbert Victor Heckford, Senior Inspector of Taxes, Board of Inland Revenue.
- Robert James Hendry, Chief Engineer, SS Malakand, Thos. & Jno. Brocklebank, Ltd.
- William Alexander Hendry, Accountant, Office of the Receiver for the Metropolitan Police District.
- John Hieatt, Chairman, Gloucester Local Employment Committee.
- Colin Belton Hollingsworth, MBE, Head of Records Branch, Ministry of Pensions & National Insurance.
- Richard Holt, MM, Assistant Regional Director, Ministry of Works.
- Leonard Charles Hook, Chief Executive Officer, War Office.
- Robert Baldwin Hovey, MC, Chairman, Zan, Ltd., Sandbach, Cheshire.
- Charles Samuel Hubbard, General Manager, Usutu Forests.
- William Edward Hutchins, JP. For political and public services in Leicester.
- Stanley Ineson, MBE, Honorary Secretary, Morley Savings Committee, Yorkshire.
- Andrew Inglis, lately Headmaster Knowetop Primary School, Motherwell, Lanarkshire.
- Martin Johnston, First Class Valuer, Board of Inland Revenue.
- Ethel Lizzie Victoria Miriam Johnstone. For political and public services in Hertfordshire.
- William Johnstone, Principal, London County Council Central School of Arts and Crafts.
- Benjamin George Jones, Director and General Manager, William Lewis (Printers) Ltd., Cardiff. For services to printing in Wales.
- Evan Jones, Assistant Accountant General, Ministry of Labour & National Service.
- Isabel Hetherington Kay, JP. For services as Chief Commissioner for Wales, Girl Guides Association.
- Howard George Henry Kearns, Senior Principal Scientific Officer, Long Ashton Research Station, University of Bristol.
- John William Kennedy, MBE. For public services in Belfast.
- George Wellstead Killick, Director of Finance, Cotton Board.
- Gwen Lally, Pageant Master and Play Producer.
- William Arthur Langton, Assistant Accountant General, General Post Office.
- Alderman Robert Colin Large, JP. For political and public services in Luton.
- Andrew Ramsay Lawson, Area General Manager, Northern (Northumberland & Cumberland) Division, National Coal Board.
- Frederick John William Legg, Superintendent, Admiralty Storage Depot, Risley.
- Cyril Watkin Leon, Deputy Chief Food Officer for Wales, Ministry of Food.
- Ian Murray Leslie, JP, Editor of The Builder.
- Abraham Lightman, Chief Executive Officer, Ministry of Food.
- Alfred William Lockyer, Director, British Red Shield Services, Salvation Army.
- Frederick James Lucas, Principal, Board of Customs & Excise.
- Richard Luck, lately Chairman, Darlington Education Committee, Durham.
- John Wilson McCagie, LRCP, lately Senior Medical Officer, Ministry of Pensions.
- James Henry McCuaig, JP, Shipyard Manager, Harland & Wolff, Ltd., Belfast.
- Thomas Warburton McCullough, lately Superintending Inspector of Factories in Scotland, now Deputy Chief Inspector of Factories, Ministry of Labour & National Service.
- Lieutenant-Colonel Donald John Macdonald, TD. For political and public services in the Western Isles.
- Duncan Lewis Mackenzie Macfarlane, MBE, Director, Mackinnon Mackenzie & Company of Japan, Ltd.
- John McVie, Keeper of the Registers of Scotland.
- Arthur Charles Manuel, Assistant Chief Architect, Ministry of Works.
- Arnold Marsh, Director, National Smoke Abatement Society.
- Alfred William Marshall, Manager, Liverpool Port, National Dock Labour Board.
- Gwendolen Alice Eilian Mason, Professor of the Harp, Royal Academy of Music.
- Thomas Matheson, Convener of the Pensions Committee of the British Legion (Scotland).
- Thomas Brisbane Meikle, Scottish Regional Secretary, Transport and General Workers' Union.
- Frank Victor Mills, Chief Executive Officer, Ministry of Transport & Civil Aviation.
- Arthur Stephen Mitson, Assistant Director, Electronics Production, Ministry of Supply.
- Roy Adamson Moir, MC, Chief Telephone Engineer, Standard Telephones and Cables, Ltd.
- Philip Edward Montagnon, Senior Principal Scientific Officer, Ministry of Fuel & Power.
- Charles Edward Sebag-Montefiore, Chairman of Managers, Finnart House Approved School, Weybridge, Surrey.
- Edward Moore. For political and public services in Kent.
- Alderman Miss Amy Hargraves Moreton. For political and public services in Warwickshire.
- William Morton, Staff Controller, Headquarters, North Eastern Region, General Post Office.
- John Mould, Deputy Chairman, East Midlands Electricity Board.
- William Calliope Muerhead, Special Director, English Steel Corporation, Ltd., Sheffield.
- Charles Frederick Grenfell Max-Muller, Head of Outside Broadcasts (Sound), British Broadcasting Corporation.
- William David Munro, Chairman, North of Scotland Milk Marketing Board.
- Edward Philmonda Murphy, Deputy Regional Controller, North Western Region, Ministry of Labour & National Service.
- Freeman Newton, Chief Constable, Herefordshire Constabulary.
- Alfred James Nicholas, Director and General Manager, South Wales Switchgear, Ltd., Monmouthshire.
- George Alfred Ogle, Regional Manager, Southern Region, Central Land Board and War Damage Commission.
- Robert Owen. For services to the study of Welsh History.
- William Joseph Pannett, Higher Collector, London Central Area, Board of Customs & Excise.
- Harold Alfred Parfitt, Deputy Director, Accountants Division, Board of Trade.
- Charles William Parker, JP, Vice-Chairman, Lincolnshire (Lindsey) Agricultural Executive Committee.
- Mona Nevill Parker, MBE, Organising Secretary of the Not Forgotten Association.
- Alderman Henry Patten, JP. For public services in Stockport, Cheshire.
- Alderman Sam Peel, JP. For public services in Norfolk.
- Arthur John Perkins, Superintendent, Royal Ordnance Factory, Cardiff.
- Thomas George Poppy, Controller, Standards Department, Board of Trade.
- Frederick William Preston, MBE, lately Assistant Accountant General, Ministry of Pensions & National Insurance.
- Alfred Charles Pritchard, Controller, Navy, Army and Air Force Institutes, Far East.
- Percy Robert Privett. For services to the Sea Cadet Corps.
- Martin John Langley Pulling, Senior Superintendent Engineer, Television, British Broadcasting Corporation.
- William Hamilton Purdie, Engineering Director, William Doxford & Sons, Ltd., Sunderland.
- Ernest Arthur Puttick, lately Principal Inspector of Taxes, Board of Inland Revenue.
- Samuel Edwin Ratcliffe, Head Postmaster, Crewe, Cheshire.
- Vera Frances Ethel Raymond, Vice Chairman, St. John and Red Cross Hospital Library Department.
- Buller Alfred Renton, Principal, Ministry of Materials.
- Roland Henry Rhodes, Regional Controller, National Assistance Board.
- Bertha Anne, Lady Richardson. For political and public services in Surrey.
- Frederick Richardson, Assistant Chief Constable, Birmingham City Police Force.
- Brigadier-General Robert Lumsden Ricketts. For political and public services in Hampshire.
- Alexander Creffield Riddelsdell, Chief Executive Officer, Ministry of Transport & Civil Aviation.
- Thomas Maurice Ridley, Chief Executive Officer, Cabinet Office.
- Albert Eric Vere Robbins, Chief Executive Officer, Ministry of Transport & Civil Aviation.
- Herbert Robinson, JP, Chairman, Belfast Rural District Council.
- Alderman Percy Round, JP, Chairman, Blackpool, Fylde & District War Pensions Committee, Lancashire.
- William Wilkinson Sapcote, Managing Director, William Sapcote & Sons, Ltd., Regional Leader, Works and Buildings Emergency Organisation, Birmingham.
- Dorothy Sarjeant, HM Inspector of Schools, Ministry of Education.
- Robert Edward Savage, lately Senior Principal Scientific Officer, Ministry of Agriculture & Fisheries.
- Captain Eldon Bruce Serjeant, Master, RMS Duke of Lancaster, British Transport Commission.
- Rowley George Shepherd, Principal Officer, East of England Marine Survey District, Ministry of Transport & Civil Aviation.
- Herbert Frederick Henry Shields, Managing and Technical Director, British Ropeway Engineering Company, Ltd.
- George Claude Havelock Siggins, General Secretary, Ulster Savings Committee.
- Sir Basil Robert James Simpson, Bt., JP. For political and public services in County Durham.
- Bertie Soutar Simpson, MB FRCSEd JP, Consultant Surgeon for the County of Sutherland.
- John Graham Simpson, Principal, Ministry of Labour & National Service.
- William Douglas Simpson, Chairman, Ancient Monuments Board for Scotland.
- Frederick George Skinner, Deputy Keeper, Science Museum.
- James Anderson Smiley, MD, Factory Doctor for East Belfast.
- Alexander Mathieson Smith, Foreign Office.
- Harry George Smith, Director of Establishment and Organisation Division, HM Stationery Office.
- Margaret Stafford Smith, MBE, Honorary Secretary, Bromley Savings Committee.
- Sydney Rawlings Smith, Principal, Pilotage Department, Trinity House.
- Ernest Robert Spragg, Member, Licensing Authority for Public Service Vehicles, Eastern Traffic Area.
- George Aubrey Stapleton, JP. For political and public services in Lambeth.
- John Marsh Stewart, Technical Manager, Ulster Steamship Company, Ltd., Belfast.
- George Robert Stratton, Violinist and Associate Conductor of the London Symphony Orchestra.
- Arthur George Tarrant, Senior Principal Officer, Road Research Laboratory, Department of Scientific & Industrial Research.
- William George Thomson, Waterguard Superintendent, Dover, Board of Customs & Excise.
- Joseph Tinker, Chairman, North Eastern Wholesale Meat Supply Association, Ltd.
- William Samuel Toms, JP, Chairman, High Wycombe Local Employment Committee, Buckinghamshire.
- John Henry Trower, MBE, Chairman, Local Savings Committee, Newcastle upon Tyne.
- Henry Bernard Turle, Member, National Savings Committee.
- Henry Charles Vogt, Assistant Director of Contracts, Air Ministry.
- Glyn Lewis Wales, JP, Member, Rhondda Urban District Council and Glamorgan County Council.
- Sydney Herbert Wallis, Chief Executive Officer, Board of Trade.
- John Herbert Warren, General Secretary, National and Local Government Officers Association.
- Vernon Whitaker, County Ambulance Officer, West Riding County Council.
- Ronald Williams, Chief Sanitary Inspector of Coventry.
- John Foster Wilson, Director and Secretary, British Empire Society for the Blind.
- Fred Worthington, JP DL, Chairman, Denton Local Employment Committee, Lancashire.
- Bernard Harold Lean Wright, Principal, British Army of the Rhine, War Office.
- Stafford Edward Douglas Barff, Director of British Information Services, Chicago.
- Thomas Brimelow, First Secretary at Her Majesty's Embassy in Moscow.
- Archibald Davidson Mason Brown, Chief Engineer, Iraq State Railways.
- Lewis William Brown, Headmaster of Hantoub Secondary School, Sudan.
- Frederick Charles Church, British subject resident in Brazil.
- Thomas Millar Cowan, First Secretary (Labour), Office of the Commissioner General for Her Majesty's Government in the United Kingdom in South-East Asia.
- Raymond Cosins Elliott, Representative in Sweden of Unilever Limited.
- Alexander Gerard Lee Goschen, Civil Liaison Officer, Carinthia, Austria.
- Margery Hill, MBE, lately Matron of the British-American Hospital, Madrid.
- Peter Warren Johnson, DSO DFC AFC, Director, Civil Aviation Branch, Control Commission for Germany (British Element).
- William Langford, Manager for France of the Associated British Machine Tool Makers Limited.
- William Frederick Charles Mackie, British Vice-Consul at El Cardon.
- Alfred Thomas Lancelot Reed, Temporary Chief Executive Officer, Economic Adviser's Office, Berlin, Control Commission for Germany (British Element).
- Arthur Patrick Ruddy, General Manager of the High Speed Alloys Mining Company Limited, Burma.
- Lieutenant-Colonel Guy Manning Stanton, MBE, Director, Stores and Ordnances Department, Sudan Government.
- William Edred Sanger Tuker, British Vice-Consul at Tocopilla.
- William Gerald Woodhead, General Manager of the English Coaling Company, Port Said.
- James Henry Butcher, Vice-Chairman of the Board of the Central African Rhodes Centenary Exhibition in Bulawayo, Southern Rhodesia, 1953, and Mayor of Bulawayo from 1949 to 1951.
- Stanley Cooke, one of the founders of The United Central Africa Association. For public services in Southern Rhodesia.
- Ian Gumming, President of the Madras Branch, Ex-Services Association, and, until recently, Chairman of the United Kingdom Citizens' Association in South India.
- Percival Alfred Driscoll, ISO, lately Secretary, Public Health Department, State of Tasmania.
- John Westridge Montague Fitt, JP, Civil Commissioner, Bulawayo, Southern Rhodesia, and a Member of the Board of the Central African Rhodes Centenary Exhibition.
- Lieutenant-Colonel Malcolm Granger Fleming, JP, Officer Commanding, British South Africa Police Reserve, Southern Rhodesia.
- Herbert Mathew Hale, Director of the South Australian Museum, State of South Australia.
- The Reverend Andries Adriaan Louw (Senior). For social welfare services rendered under the auspices of the Morgenster Mission in Southern Rhodesia.
- James Stewart McEwin, JP, Chairman, District Council of Blyth, State of South Australia.
- David Charles Bethune Pilkington, Chairman of the Calcutta Branch of the United Kingdom Citizens' Association in India.
- Ernest Sorell. For services to sporting and philanthropic organisations in the State of Tasmania.
- Stuart Henry Stevenson, lately Architect-in-Chief, State of South Australia.
- Ronald Stean Tyson, General Manager, Launceston Bank for Savings, State of Tasmania.
- Lieutenant-Colonel Joseph Vincent Abela, MBE, Civil Defence Commissioner and Commandant of the Civil Defence School, Malta.
- Lieutenant-Colonel George Robert Goodwill Alston, MC ED. For public services in Trinidad.
- John Harold Baldwin, Chief Accountant, East African Railways and Harbours Corporation.
- James Begbie, Superintendent Engineer, Marine Department, Nigeria.
- Awang Besar bin Ong Kiat, MBE. For public services in North Borneo.
- Alan Edmund Grove Blades, Colonial Police Service, Senior Assistant Commissioner of Police, Singapore.
- Claude Bramall Burgess, Colonial Administrative Service, Defence Secretary, Hong Kong.
- The Reverend Robert George Matheson Calderwood, MC, Missionary of the Church of Scotland Mission and Secretary of the Mission Council, Kenya.
- Philip Carrel, Colonial Administrative Service, District Commissioner, Somaliland.
- Macormack Charles Farrell Easmon, MD, Senior Medical Officer, Sierra Leone.
- Major Lewis Fenech, Manager, Milk Marketing Undertaking, Malta.
- Neil George Ferguson, Colonial Engineering Service, State Engineer, Kelantan, Federation of Malaya.
- Reginald Honon Fletcher, ISO. For public services in Jamaica.
- Max Frederick Garling, Colonial Administrative Service, District Officer, Federation of Malaya.
- Edith Francis Goring, Colonial Education Service, Principal, European Education Department, Northern Rhodesia.
- Ernest Hira Greet, Senior Engineer, Civil Engineering Department, Office of the Crown Agents for the Colonies.
- Gopal Haridas, MD. For services to the St. John Ambulance Brigade and movement in Singapore.
- Abdul Jawad Hassanali. For public services in Aden.
- Charles John Watney Hodgson. For public services in Tanganyika.
- John William Jehu lately Deputy Director and Engineer-in-Chief, Posts & Telegraphs Department, Nigeria.
- Samuel Horton Oluwole Jones, MB ChB, Colonial Medical Service, Director of Medical Services, Gambia.
- Ronald Earle Kelsick, Agricultural Superintendent, St. Kitts, Nevis, Anguilla, Leeward Islands.
- The Reverend Canon Robert Julian Laurie, Rector-in-Charge, Holy Trinity Church, Castries, and Anglican Church, Dennery, Windward Islands.
- Douglas Gray Bazett Leakey, Colonial Forest Service, Assistant Conservator of Forests, Kenya.
- Caspar Eric Leembruggen, Colonial Customs Service, Deputy Comptroller Customs & Excise, Nigeria.
- Francis Alfred Loyd, MBE, Colonial Administrative Service, District Commissioner, Fort Hall, Kenya.
- Vatapakat Ramanmenon Narayana Menon, MB, Medical Officer, Dindings, Federation of Malaya.
- The Reverend Sister Margaret Mary Nolan, MB MCh. For medical and missionary work in Nigeria.
- Ong Hap Leong. For public services in Sarawak.
- George Kingsley Roth, Colonial Administrative Service, Administrative Officer, Fiji.
- Robert Thomas Stevens, MBE, Director, Electricity & Telephones, Mauritius.
- Duncan Stevenson, Colonial Forest Service, Chief Conservator of Forests, Gold Coast.
- Teoh Thye Moh, Editor Straits Echo & Times of Malaya, Federation of Malaya.
- Henry George Triay, MD ChB. For medical services in Gibraltar.
- Hubert Carey Trowell, MD FRCP, Colonial Medical Service, Specialist (Physician), Uganda.
- William Henderson Watson, MD, Medical Officer-in-Charge, Mental Hospital, Nyasaland.
- William Nelson Watson, MBE. For public services in Northern Rhodesia.
- Eric Vaughan Williams, Director of Public Works, British Honduras.

Honorary

- Tuan Haji Mohamed Razalli bin Haji Mohamed Isa, JP, Orang Kaya Mentri Paduka Tuan, Perak, Orang Besar Jajahan, Larut and Matang, Federation of Malaya.
- Ja'afar bin Mampak, Assistant Agricultural Officer-in-Charge, Trengganu, Federation of Malaya.
- The Right Reverend Bishop Alphonso Chukwuma Onyeabo, lately Assistant Bishop to the Bishop on the Niger, Nigeria.
- Abdullahi, MBE, Emir of Yauri, Nigeria.
- Atoshi Agbumanu IV, Chief of Wukari and Minister without Portfolio in the Northern Region Executive Council, Nigeria.
- Mallam-Bello Kano, District Head Dawaki ta Tofa, Kano Emirate, and Northern Regional Minister of Works, Nigeria.
- Nasoro Saidi Fundikira, Chief of Unyanyembe, Tabora District, Tanganyika.

==== Member of the Order of the British Empire (MBE) ====
Military Division

Navy

- Temporary Senior Commissioned Air Control Officer George Arthur Biles Barrett, RN (Retired).
- Lieutenant (Quartermaster) Sydney Boyd, BEM, Royal Marines.
- Senior Commissioned Gunner Thomas Bonnar Brownlee, RN.
- Lieutenant-Commander George Henry Cunningham, RN.
- Lieutenant-Commander (S) Harold Cecil Freeman, RNVR.
- Senior Commissioned Gunner Donald Groves, RN (serving with the Indian Navy).
- Acting Shipwright Lieutenant-Commander Sydney John Hill, RN.
- Lieutenant-Commander (L) William Arthur King, RN.
- Lieutenant-Commander Victor Wallace Poore, RN (Retired).
- Second Officer Leta Mary Ridley, WRNS.
- Lieutenant (S) Frederick John Thacker, RN.
- Lieutenant (E) Ernest Charles Webb, RN (Retired).
- Lieutenant (E) Douglas Frank Westbrook, RN (Retired).
- Lieutenant Peter Wilson, RN (serving with the Royal Malayan Navy).

Army

- Captain Edward Robert Jones Barlow (324612), Royal Regiment of Artillery, Territorial Army.
- Major John Edward Beazley, TD (155604), The Essex Regiment, Territorial Army.
- Major John Stanley William Bennett, TD (79366), Corps of Royal Engineers.
- Major Sidney George Beverley (113803), Corps of Royal Engineers.
- Major (Quartermaster) Giovanni Bonello (107527), Royal Malta Artillery.
- Major (Quartermaster) Edward George Broomfield (165458), Royal Regiment of Artillery.
- Major Stewart Arthur Wilson-Brown, MC (36003), Royal Regiment of Artillery.
- Major William St. George Conway Hawkshaw-Burn (197164), The South Wales Borderers.
- Captain James David Cameron (359096), Royal Army Medical Corps, Territorial Army.
- Major John Edward Lovelace Carter, MC (67055), Corps of Royal Engineers.
- Major James Charles Morton Morton-Clarke (64617), The Royal Berkshire Regiment (Princess Charlotte of Wales's).
- Major (Paymaster) Henry Cooper (159798), Royal Army Pay Corps.
- Major (Temporary) Leslie Harold Corke (222613), Royal Regiment of Artillery.
- Major William Walter Creevy (151437), Royal Corps of Signals, Territorial Army.
- Major Ord Adams Cunningham, TD (2338), Royal Regiment of Artillery, Territorial Army.
- No.726655 Warrant Officer Class II Arthur Edwin Davies, Royal Regiment of Artillery, Territorial Army.
- Major (Temporary) Daniel Davies, MC (244334), Royal Regiment of Artillery.
- Major (Quartermaster) Louis Charles Marcel Dutot (131476), The Dorset Regiment.
- Major (Quartermaster) Walter Edwards (254584), The Duke of Cornwall's Light Infantry.
- No.6908943 Warrant Officer Class I Walter Hall Edwards, The Rifle Brigade (Prince Consort's Own), Territorial Army.
- No.838073 Warrant Officer Class I Vincent Henry Lewis Estop, Royal Regiment of Artillery.
- Major John Montagu Flint (71055), Corps of Royal Engineers.
- No.797518 Warrant Officer Class II Henry Gibson Gowan, Royal Regiment of Artillery.
- Major John Nicholas Revans Hallett (71103), The Royal Norfolk Regiment.
- Major Eveline May Harroway (239588), Women's Royal Army Corps, Territorial Army.
- No.2318690 Warrant Officer Class I Sidney Frank Hart, Royal Corps of Signals.
- Major John Andrew Hawkins (131068), Army Catering Corps (now RARO).
- Major (Acting) Albert Hill (351810), Army Cadet Force.
- Major (Temporary) The Honourable Henry Montagu Douglas-Home (150474), General List.
- Lieutenant (Quartermaster) Harold William Humphries (420427), Welsh Guards.
- Major (Quartermaster) John Jenkins (221771), The Royal Berkshire Regiment (Princess Charlotte of Wales's).
- Major Owen Rees Jenkins (53881), Royal Regiment of Artillery.
- No.787430 Warrant Officer Class II Arthur George Jolley, Royal Regiment of Artillery, Territorial Army.
- The Reverend Daniel Kelleher, MC, Chaplain to the Forces, Fourth Class (178160 X), Royal Army Chaplains' Department.
- No.3651274 Warrant Officer Class I Frederick Kelly, DCM, The Royal Irish Fusiliers.
- Honorary Captain (GCO) Kharaksing Gurung (IO1361), The Brigade of Gurkhas.
- No.4534783 Warrant Officer Class II Stanley Kiddy, The West Yorkshire Regiment (The Prince of Wales's Own), Territorial Army.
- Major (Quartermaster) Adam Kilburn (135347), Corps of Royal Electrical & Mechanical Engineers.
- Captain (Quartermaster) William Charles Lacey (358464), Royal Regiment of Artillery.
- No.816426 Warrant Officer Class I James Leslie, Royal Regiment of Artillery.
- Major (Quartermaster) Donald Ross Martin, TD (79417), Royal Regiment of Artillery, Territorial Army.
- Captain Anthony Reginald Matthews (304203), Corps of Royal Engineers.
- Major Ronald Augustine Nightingale (232773), Royal Army Service Corps.
- Major (Quartermaster) William James Oxenham (131063), The Gloucestershire Regiment (now retired).
- No.S/54471 Warrant Officer Class I Wilfred Pritchard, Royal Army Service Corps.
- No.6081648 Warrant Officer Class II Frederick Harold Pullan, The Queen's Royal Regiment (West Surrey), Territorial Army.
- Major (Quartermaster) William Frederick Charles Rawlinson (211689), Corps of Royal Engineers.
- Captain (Quartermaster) George Ridge (356252), Royal Armoured Corps.
- Major William John Ross (112956), The Essex Regiment.
- Captain (Quartermaster) Ernest Victor Skinner (355655), Royal Regiment of Artillery.
- No.2874491 Warrant Officer Class I (Acting) James Smith, Corps of Royal Military Police.
- Major (Quartermaster) Harvey Hutton Snaith, TD (88401), The East Lancashire Regiment, Territorial Army.
- Major (AIOO) Joseph Acland Swinburne Stephenson (231939), Royal Army Ordnance Corps.
- Major Cyril Philip Tamlyn (68248), Duke of Cornwall's Light Infantry.
- Major Ronald Hugo Tierney (64514), Royal Regiment of Artillery.
- No.812132 Warrant Officer Class I (Acting) Arthur James Velvick, Royal Regiment of Artillery.
- Major (Acting) Donald Watterson (264409), Combined Cadet Force.
- Major (Quartermaster) Leonard James Webley (254005), 17th/21st Lancers, Royal Armoured Corps.
- Major (Quartermaster) Alfred Stanley Cecil Westlake (191686), Royal Regiment of Artillery.
- Major (AIA) Thomas Wheelright (93291), Corps of Royal Electrical & Mechanical Engineers.
- No.W/5840 Warrant Officer Class II Annie Whittaker, Women's Royal Army Corps.
- Captain (Temporary) Fredrick Leslie Whittle (427715), Corps of Royal Electrical & Mechanical Engineers.
- Major (Temporary) George Walter Bentley Wise (335007), Royal Pioneer Corps.
- Major (Acting) The Reverend Philip Arthur Wright (305653), Army Cadet Force.
- Major George Henry Calvert, ED, Royal Hong Kong Defence Force.
- Lieutenant Edward Charles Fincher, Royal Hong Kong Defence Force.
- Major Philip William Holt, ED, Singapore Volunteer Corps.

Air Force

- Squadron Leader Stewart Findlay (44478).
- Squadron Leader John Herbert Spencer (46237).
- Acting Squadron Leader Wilfred Goodier Hughes (43512).
- Acting Squadron Leader Reginald George Little (50742).
- Acting Squadron Leader Frank Roland Mangham (66863), RAFVR.
- Acting Squadron Leader Christopher Berkeley Wynn-Parry, BM BCh (500295).
- Acting Squadron Leader Gerard Francis Turnbull, AFC (195913).
- Flight Lieutenant Frederick Ernest Ashford (51946).
- Flight Lieutenant Edward Charles Bartlett (44385).
- Flight Lieutenant Murray Barton (57695).
- Flight Lieutenant William Maxwell Bush Farrow (47373).
- Flight Lieutenant Gordon Edward Peer Foot (188394).
- Flight Lieutenant Leonard George Hopkinson (49141).
- Flight Lieutenant Alexander Geoffrey Kenyon (117309).
- Flight Lieutenant Ernest Frederick George Launder (51935) (Retired).
- Flight Lieutenant John Ninian, DFC (53478).
- Flight Officer Winifred Joan Potts (1905), WRAF.
- Flight Lieutenant Ernest Scott (55945).
- Flight Lieutenant Robert Guy Shillingford (204331), RAuxAF.
- Flight Lieutenant Jack Leslie Wallace (57450).
- Acting Flight Lieutenant Joseph Abner Lee (136229), Reserve of Officers.
- Warrant Officer Alexander Findlay (510744).
- Warrant Officer William Alexander Fraser (550908).
- Warrant Officer William Gommo (358562).
- Warrant Officer John Samuel Allan Madeley (565333).
- Warrant Officer William Rendall Moodie (520261).
- Warrant Officer Albert Emsley Parker (560371).
- Warrant Officer William George Sleep (590371).
- Warrant Officer William Thompson (590241).
- Acting Warrant Officer John Francis George Hunter (565165).
- Rab Tremma Yacube Khoshaba (X.13), Royal Air Force Levies, Iraq.

Civil Division

- Abdullah bin Abdul Ghani, Clerk, Special Grade Maintenance Base, Seletar, Singapore.
- Frederick George Ackerman, Chief Executive Officer, Ministry of Pensions & National Insurance.
- William Henry Adcock. For political and public services in Bury.
- William Richard Anstie, Depot Superintendent, Bridgend, Glamorganshire, British Road Services.
- William John Archard, JP. For political and public services in Glamorgan.
- Joseph Edward Arthur, Higher Executive Officer, Ministry of Health.
- Edmund Aspinall, Manager, Cotton Yarn Doubling Mill, Halliwell, Bolton, Lancashire.
- Mary Austin. For public services in the City of Londonderry.
- William Edmund Withers Bacon, Quantity Surveyor, War Office.
- William James Baker, Divisional Manager, Northern Division, South Western Gas Board.
- John Stephen Ball, Head of Design and Development Department, Henry Simon, Ltd., Stockport.
- William Liddle Barker, Vice-Chairman, Wearside District Advisory Committee, Northern Regional Board for Industry.
- William Davison Barnes. For political and public services in Edinburgh.
- James Barr, Secretary, National Association of Scottish Woollen Manufacturers.
- Oliver Harold Barron, Engineer, Planning and Installation Department, British Broadcasting Corporation
- Olive May Barton, Clerical Officer, Board of Trade.
- John Frederick Batstone, Higher Executive Officer, United Kingdom Treasury and Supply Delegation, Washington.
- Richard Charles Baverstock, lately Assistant Secretary and Establishment Officer, Royal National Lifeboat Institution.
- Observer-Lieutenant Leonard Stanley Beaufoy, lately Duty Controller, No. 1 Group, Maidstone, Royal Observer Corps.
- Alderman Albert John Edgar Beck, JP, Chairman, Swindon, Chippenham and District War Pensions Committee, Wiltshire.
- Bernard Stanley Billingham, Resident Engineer, Tunis, Imperial War Graves Commission.
- Robert Cruickshank Birnie, Area Engineer, Telephone Manager's Office, Aberdeen.
- Theodore William Blake, Welfare Officer, Westwood Works, Baker Perkins, Peterborough.
- William George Blishen, Head of Branch, Tithe Redemption Commission.
- Frank Boardman. For services as Engineer and Manager, Cardiff Undertaking, Wales Gas Board.
- John Anthony Wyndham Bolt, Senior Assistant, Frank C. Strick & Company (Busra), Ltd.
- Douglas Frederick Bowering, Senior Experimental Officer, Meteorological Office, Air Ministry.
- William Henry Bowker, M. M., lately Inspector-in-Charge, Aeronautical Inspection Directorate, Ministry of Supply.
- David Joachim Bowman, Section Leader, Special Listening Section, Monitoring Service, British Broadcasting Corporation.
- Beatrice Scott Vawdrey Brander, JP. For political and public services in Glasgow.
- John Stamper Briggs, Higher Executive Officer, Whitehaven District Office, Cumberland, Board of Trade.
- Kelsall Broadley, Chairman, Combined Sowerby Bridge and Halifax District Committee, West Riding of Yorkshire Agricultural Executive Committee.
- John Brocklebank, JP, Vice-Chairman, North Yorkshire Local Employment Committee.
- Margaret Elizabeth Reeve Brooke, Member of the Council of Management, London Hostels Association, Ltd.
- Charles William Brown, Local Fuel Overseer, Hoddesdon Urban District Council and other Urban and Rural Districts in Hertfordshire.
- Mary Brown, lately Headmistress, Marsh Hill Open Air School, Birmingham.
- John Laing Buchan, Director and Manager, Electrical Department, William Broady & Son, Ltd., Hull.
- Albert Victor Buddin, Senior Executive Officer, Ministry of Food.
- Alfred Joseph Bull, Traffic Superintendent, Continental Telephone Exchange, General Post Office.
- Cyril Edward Aubrey Bull, JP, Headmaster, Conway Primary School, Plumstead.
- Arthur James Burt, Higher Clerical Officer, Metropolitan Police Office.
- Hedworth Burt, Probation Officer, Durham.
- Ethel Mary Butcher, Controller of Typists, Outport Establishments, Admiralty.
- Fred Calvert, Superintendent, Norfolk Constabulary.
- Jessie Robb Campbell, Matron, Canaan Lodge Children's Home, Edinburgh.
- William Francis Cannon, JP, County Organiser, National Union of Agricultural Workers.
- Paul Maxwell Carment, Technical Engineer, Headquarters, No. 90 Group.
- Frederick George Cawsey, Cost Accountant, Royal Mint.
- Edith Amelia Chamberlayne, JP, Vice Chairman, Winchester Rural District Council.
- William James Chapman, Chief Superintendent, Metropolitan Police Force.
- Arthur Joseph Chew, Honorary Secretary, Irish Bowling Association.
- Frank Clark, Radio Officer, MV Isipingo, (Bank Line, Ltd.), Marconi International Marine Communication Company, Ltd.
- Harold John Clark, Senior Technical Officer, Ministry of Works.
- William Cole, Divisional Transport Officer, North Eastern Division, National Coal Board.
- Godfrey Joseph Cooper, Chairman, Hackney Unit, Sea Cadet Corps.
- William Claude Cooper, Senior Technical Officer, Ministry of Supply (Died 22 December 1953) — Dated 20 December 1953.
- Henry John Milford Couch, Senior Ship Surveyor, Ministry of Transport & Civil Aviation.
- Lucy Elizabeth Cox, Deputy President, Perthshire Branch, British Red Cross Society.
- Henry John Cull, Assistant Head, Department of Physics and Mathematics, Birmingham College of Technology.
- Percy Edwin Curnock, Ceramic Artist, Doulton and Co., Ltd., Burslem.
- William Thomas Cuthbert, Legal Assistant, Registry of Friendly Societies.
- Arthur Gordon Cutler, Fruit Grower and Market Gardener, Worcestershire.
- Irene May Dagger, County Borough Organiser, Birmingham, Women's Voluntary Services.
- Edna Irene Daglish, Member of Northamptonshire County Staff (Civil Defence), Women's Voluntary Services.
- Vera Mary Dallas, Principal Investigator, Royal Commission on Historical Monuments (England).
- Claude George Dann, Chief Sales Superintendent, Telephone Manager's Office, Centre Area, London.
- James Dickinson Darbyshire. For services to Lads' Clubs in Manchester and Salford.
- John David, Hospital Secretary, Queen Mary's Hospital, Roehampton.
- Douglas Reginald Davidson, Chief Executive Officer, National Savings Committee.
- Louis Ernest Davidson, Senior Executive Officer, Ministry of Pensions & National Insurance.
- Bleddyn Lloyd Davies, JP, Chairman, Taunton Local Savings Committee.
- Myfanwy Davies, Grade III Advisory Officer, National Agricultural Advisory Service.
- Leslie Thornley Dawes, Commercial Manager, Secretary and Director, Beyer, Peacock & Company, Gorton, Manchester.
- James Dawson, Engineer, Northern General Transport Company
- Joseph Arnold Dawson, Secretary, West Cumberland Industrial Development Company
- Louis Charles Dennis, Deputy Principal, Ministry of Home Affairs, Northern Ireland.
- Nazlie Violet Dinjian, Senior Executive Officer, Ministry of Education.
- Captain Peter Anthony Ditton, Master, SS Saint Edmund, Saint Line, Ltd.
- William John Dixon, Deputy Contracts Manager (Pricing), Automatic Telephone & Electric Company, Ltd., Liverpool.
- Phyllis Mary Dothie, Senior Executive Officer, Post Office Savings Department (Savings Certificate Division), General Post Office.
- George Gordon Down, Clerk, West Sussex Executive Council, National Health Service.
- Falconer Bayne Dryburgh, County Surveyor, Zetland.
- Annabelle Powrie Duncan, Secretary and Lecturer, Scottish Council of the Alliance of Honour.
- Alexander Wallace Dunlop, Engineering Superintendent, Short Brothers & Harland, Ltd., Belfast.
- Agnes Earl. For political and public services in the North Riding of Yorkshire.
- Ernest Herman Edwards, Managing Clerk, British Transport Commission.
- John Ralph Edwards. For architectural services in South-West England.
- William Ewart Egar, Chairman, Willenhall Savings Committee, Staffordshire.
- Captain Arthur Ellis, Master, MV St. Thomas, South American Saint Line, Ltd.
- Eleanor Evans, JP. For political and public services in Flintshire.
- John Morgan Evans, Member, Central Milk Distributive Committee.
- Morgan Thomas Evans, Chairman, Carmarthen Local Savings Committee.
- Edith Annie Farrall, Leader, The Beacon Club, Suez.
- Marie Josephine Feil, Foreign Office.
- Edward William Ferrier, Detective Chief Superintendent, City of Edinburgh Police.
- Ethel Mary Calyert Footitt. For political and public services in Nottinghamshire.
- Eleanor Hersilie Mary Foster. For political and public services in Dorset.
- Henry Frederick Frampton, Cashier and Head of Accounts Department, Headquarters, Royal National Mission to Deep Sea Fishermen.
- Anne Wright Frank, Foreign Office.
- Ronald French, Assistant Chief Officer, Leeds Fire Brigade.
- Reginald Wallace Gardner, Senior Assessor, Central Land Board and War Damage Commission.
- The Honourable Violet Ethel Mary Gerard, County Organiser, Hertfordshire, Women's Voluntary Services.
- Frederick Arthur Gibbs, Inspector of Taxes, Board of Inland Revenue.
- John David Gilbert, Senior Information Officer, Central Office of Information.
- Sidney Thomas Gill, Senior Partner, Thomas Gill & Son (Norwich), Ltd.
- Florence Margaretta Glanvill. For political and public services in Battersea.
- Herbert Francis William Golding, Chief Inspector, Northern Aluminium Company, Ltd., Banbury, Oxfordshire.
- Captain Reginald Eric Goodman, District Superintendent, Penzance, Corporation of Trinity House.
- Albert Goodwin, Member, North Staffordshire District Advisory Committee, Midland Regional Board for Industry.
- William Herbert Gordon, Assistant Director of Imported Meat, Ministry of Food.
- Georgina Jessie Graham, Civil Defence Officer, Scottish Headquarters, Women's Voluntary Services.
- Frank Henry Green, Senior Executive Officer, Ministry of Supply.
- Thomas Henry Greene. For public services in County Down.
- Thomas Henry Griffiths, Divisional Officer, Nottinghamshire Fire Brigade.
- Thomas John Griffiths, Higher Executive Officer, Postal Services Department, General Post Office.
- William Henry Frederick Griffiths, Chief Engineer, H. W. Sullivan, Ltd., Peckham.
- George William Grooby. For public services in Derbyshire and the West Riding of Yorkshire.
- Wilfred Thomas Groom. For political and public services in Northamptonshire.
- Elsie Mabel Guisani, Superintendent of Typists, Board of HM Customs & Excise.
- Florence Caroline Mary Hackett, Honorary Secretary, Sarisbury Savings Group, Hampshire.
- Frederick Richard Hallett, Clerk to the Master of the Rolls, Supreme Court of Judicature.
- Henry John Harbour, Test Controller, E. K. Cole, Ltd., Ekco Works, Southend-on-Sea, Essex.
- Percival Harry Hardidge, Director and Manager, David Hollander & Sons, Ltd., Birmingham.
- Edwyn Worrall Mountain Hardy, BEM, Chief Clerk, British Joint Services Mission, Washington.
- Gordon Harley, MC, Training Service Officer II, Ministry of Labour & National Service.
- Dorothy Alice Maud Harper. For political and public services in Bath.
- Audrey Harris, County Secretary, Gloucestershire Federation of Women's Institutes.
- Eileen Winefride Harris. For political and public services in Essex.
- Mary Elizabeth Harrison, County Midwife for Kent.
- John Hastings, Civilian Workshop Officer (Technical Grade I), Royal Electrical & Mechanical Engineers Workshops, Aldershot.
- Anne Mary Patricia Hatfield. For political services.
- Percy Hawkins, Superintendent, Derbyshire Constabulary and Commandant, No. 1 District, Police Training Centre.
- Reuben John Hawley, MC, Land and Estate Agent, Staveley Iron & Chemical Company, Ltd.
- Reginald Victor Hayman, Architect. For services to the Glamorgan Police Authority.
- William Eccles Henry, Town Clerk, Coleraine, County Londonderry.
- George Frederick Henson, President, Grenadier Guards Comrades Association, Manchester.
- Thomas Aubrey Hesketh, Divisional Officer, West Sussex Fire Brigade.
- Joseph William Higgs, Divisional Secretary, Amalgamated Union of Building Trade Workers.
- Alcuin Hill, Chairman, Warrington, Widnes and District War Pensions Committee, Lancashire.
- James William Hill. For services as Licensing Officer, London, Ministry of Works.
- Vera Millicent Hills, Supervisor, Duplicating Section, British Broadcasting Corporation.
- John Hirst. For services to the war disabled.
- Harry Holliday, Chief Superintendent, Post Office Sorting Office, Nottingham.
- Richard Holmes, Chairman, Chesterfield and District War Pensions Committee, Derbyshire.
- Benjamin Howe, Executive Officer, Army Medal Office, Droitwich.
- Arthur Alfred Howick, Secretary Administrator of the British Legion Village, Maidstone, Kent.
- George James Hughes, Senior Foreman, Laminated Department, Bakelite, Ltd., Birmingham.
- George Cutler Huke, Clerical Officer, Royal Naval Barracks, Chatham.
- John Fiddes Hymers, JP. For political and public services in Roxburghshire.
- Harold Anson, Higher Executive Officer, Northern Traffic Area, Ministry of Transport & Civil Aviation.
- William Robert Ingram, lately Superintendent of Works, Ministry of Works.
- Andrew Fraser Insch, Chief Clerk of Works, Aberdeen.
- Edward Beaumont Ivemey, Senior Staff Officer, Admiralty.
- Elizabeth James, District Nurse-Midwife, Cardiganshire County Council.
- John David James, lately Secretary, Aberdare Gardeners' Society.
- Edward James Jarvis, Deputy Manager, Surrey Sub-Area, South Eastern Electricity Board.
- Ralph John Jenkins, Higher Executive Officer, Office of the High Commissioner for the United Kingdom in India.
- James Charles Johnson, Piermaster and Foreshore Manager to the Corporation, Southend-on-Sea, Essex.
- William Charles Johnson, Chief Chemist, Baird & Tatlock (London), Ltd., Chadwell Heath, Essex.
- Amy Catherine Johnston, Foreign Office.
- Jessie Hay Johnston. For political and public services in Aberdeen.
- Edward Jones, JP, Managing Secretary, Tredegar Industrial & Provident Society, Ltd.
- Edward Cecil Jones, MC JP, Chairman, Southend-on-Sea and District War Pensions Committee, Essex.
- Thomas Edward Jones, Manager, Mansfield Remploy Factory, Nottinghamshire.
- Ella Priscilla Jorden, Headquarters Overseas Field Officer, British Red Cross Society.
- Eveline Maud Kaddy. For political services.
- Philip Sims Kemsley, Works Superintendent, Gas Turbine Combustion Production Factories, Joseph Lucas, Ltd., Burnley.
- Eva Dorothy Kenny, County Borough Organiser, York, Women's Voluntary Services.
- James Killin, District Traffic Superintendent, Perth, British Transport Commission, Scottish Region.
- Elizabeth Ferguson Kilpatrick, Club Organiser, Women's Voluntary Services, Kurhaus, Bad Oeynhausen, British Army of the Rhine.
- Doris Cecilia King. For political and public services in Kent and Sussex.
- Cyril Leonard Kingston, Insurance Officer, British Overseas Airways Corporation.
- Frank Henry Laite, Higher Executive Officer, Ministry of Pensions & National Insurance.
- Arthur Laverack, Senior Executive Officer, Ordnance Survey Department, Ministry of Agriculture & Fisheries.
- Ernest Joseph Frederick Lawrence, Regional Collector of Taxes, Board of Inland Revenue.
- Walter Reginald John Leach, Higher Executive Officer, Ministry of Supply.
- John Henry Lee, Senior Executive Officer, Department of Agriculture for Scotland.
- Sarah Troughton Lee, Superintendent, Boot and Shoe Factory, Somervell Brothers, Ltd., Kendal, Westmorland.
- Leonard John Leek, Chief Executive Officer, Ministry of Pensions & National Insurance.
- Horace Lefevre, Higher Executive Officer, Ministry of Transport & Civil Aviation.
- May Legg, Clerical Officer, Ministry of Transport & Civil Aviation.
- Bessie Leith, Provost of the Royal Burgh of Wick, Caithness.
- David Robert James Veitch Lennox, Senior Executive Officer, Department of Health for Scotland.
- Peter Frederick Lewindon, Manager, Germany, British European Airways Corporation.
- James Grandison Drysdale Lindsay, Chief Engineer, SS Taksang, Indo-China Steam Navigation Company
- Agnes Jane Little, Medical Ward Sister, Manchester Royal Infirmary.
- Clifford Ack Llewellin, Senior Executive Officer, Welsh Office, Ministry of Housing & Local Government.
- George Low, lately Farm Manager, Agricultural Research Institute, Hillsborough, County Down.
- Walter Samuel Mabey, Higher Executive Officer, Ministry of Pensions & National Insurance.
- John James Keith McArthur, Manager, Derby Employment Exchange, Ministry of Labour & National Service.
- Alexander Macaulay, MC, County Adviser, East Aberdeenshire, North of Scotland College of Agriculture.
- Daniel Victor McCall, Principal, Beechfield Primary School, Belfast.
- James McCandlis, JP, Chairman, Hillsborough and District Local Savings Committee, County Down.
- Robert McCarter, Secretary, City and County Hospital, Londonderry.
- Thomas McClean, Manager, Armley Employment Exchange, Ministry of Labour & National Service.
- Mary Jane Sloan McCrindle, Honorary Secretary, Kirkcudbrightshire Savings Committee.
- Margaret Kate Macdona. For political and public services in the Wirral.
- Angus Sinclair Macintosh, DSM, Skipper of the motor fishing vessel Primula.
- Colin McKay, Head Foreman Shipwright, John Brown & Company, Clydebank.
- John Richard Mackenzie, MM, Higher Executive Officer, Board of Customs & Excise.
- Frederick James McNeill, Chief Inspector of Weights and Measures, Ministry of Commerce, Northern Ireland.
- Flora Martin, District Nurse, Eriskay, Outer Hebrides.
- William Kenneth Martin, Inspector of Taxes, Board of Inland Revenue.
- Muriel Phyllis Carroll-Marx, County Organiser, County of London, Women's Voluntary Services.
- David Matheson, Waterguard Surveyor, Inverness, Board of Customs & Excise. (Died 28 December 1953) — Dated 20 December 1953.
- William Rupert Maunder, Technical Officer (Grade I), Ministry of Transport & Civil Aviation.
- Cyril Ernest Mellish, Chief Meat Inspector, Smithfield Market, London.
- Cicely Mary Middleton, Director, Films Department, British Council.
- Charles Edward Miles, Manager, Hampton Launch Works, Ltd., Hampton, Middlesex.
- John Bloor Mills, Chief Designer, Fodens, Sandbach, Cheshire.
- Isabella Adamson Mitchell, Head of Galloway House Residential School, Wigtownshire.
- John Maurice Montague, Senior Executive Officer, Ministry of Materials.
- Joseph Moody, Higher Executive Officer, General Register Office.
- Iva Genevieve Mooney, Senior Executive Officer, Reading Regional Office, Ministry of Housing & Local Government.
- William Herron Morgan, Headmaster, Guide Post Secondary Modern School, Choppington, Northumberland.
- Francis Dennis Murphy, Staff Officer, Board of Inland Revenue.
- Ernest Arthur Musto, Senior Executive Officer, Ministry of Fuel & Power.
- John George Tedford Nelson, District Inspector, Royal Ulster Constabulary.
- Fred Newell, lately Senior Executive Officer, Air Ministry.
- Alderman Charles Maurice Newton, Chairman of Committee, No. 5 (Northampton) Squadron, Air Training Corps.
- Sidney George Nicholls, Senior Executive Officer, Ministry of Pensions & National Insurance.
- Florence Mabel Norman, Training Officer, National Institute of Houseworkers, Ltd.
- Robert Douglas Page, Assistant Secretary, The Shipwrecked Fishermen and Mariners' Royal Benevolent Society.
- Albert Parker, JP, Chairman, Tipton Local Employment Committee, Staffordshire.
- Audrey Elizabeth Peareth Parker. For political and public services in Cambridge.
- Ernest Albert Pascall, District House Coal Officer, Medway Towns House Coal Distribution (Emergency) Scheme.
- Thomas Noel Pattinson, Chief Clerk and Chief Accountant, County of Northumberland Territorial and Auxiliary Forces Association.
- George Paul, Member, National Savings Committee, representing the National Union of Teachers.
- Herbert William Pawsey, Higher Executive Officer, Air Ministry.
- Robert Percival Pedley, Research Engineer, Percival Aircraft, Ltd.
- Stanley Pickering, General Manager, Recommissioned Mills Ltd., Ministry of Food.
- Harold Nathan Pitstow, Conductor and Secretary of the Bell Ringers of Westminster Abbey.
- John Francis Power, JP, Honorary Secretary, Leeds Savings Committee.
- Arthur Stephen Albert Pryor, Senior Executive Officer, Air Ministry.
- Frances Gweneth Pyman. For charitable and social work in West Hartlepool, County Durham.
- Alfred Henry Quilley, JP, Alderman, Hampshire County Council.
- Catherine Priscilla Rabagliati. For political and public services in Paddington.
- Albert Sidney Raven, JP Chairman, Chelmsford Local Employment Committee and Disablement Advisory Committee, Essex.
- Edward John Redmond, Executive Officer, Ministry of Transport & Civil Aviation.
- Richard Richards, Manager, Lewis Merthyr Collieries, South Western Division, National Coal Board.
- Arthur Frederick Richardson, Temporary Technical Officer, HM Stationery Office.
- Kathleen Rider, Matron, St. Saviour's Hospital, Jersey.
- Alfred Joseph Riley, MC, Higher Executive Officer, HM Treasury
- George Henry Rippon, Technical Director, Maun Industries, Ltd., Mansfield.
- John Rix, Production Manager, Vespers, Ltd., Portsmouth.
- Edward Richard Roberts, Higher Executive Officer, Ministry of Education.
- Colonel Josiah James Robertson, DSO TD JP DL, Chairman, North of Scotland War Pensions Committee.
- Thomas Robins, JP, Member, Devon Agricultural Executive Committee.
- Margaret Gladys Robinson, Headmistress, Marlborough Secondary Modern Girls' School, Isleworth, Middlesex.
- Hubert Rogers, Grade 3 Officer, Midlands Regional Office, Ministry of Labour & National Service.
- Henrietta Syme Russell, Secretary, Mental After-Care Association.
- Horace Cyril Sarjeant, Foreign Office.
- Lillian Savage, Nurse, War Office.
- Cyril Frederick Scott, Assistant Manager, Personnel Department, Navy, Army & Air Force Institutes.
- Herbert Wilfred Sealley, Dock Superintendent, Avonmouth Docks.
- Stanley Ernest Selves, Higher Executive Officer, National Assistance Board.
- William James Sergent, Chairman, "F" Division, Liverpool Savings Committee.
- John Thomas Sharp, lately Senior Assistant Engineer (Generation Construction Department), South West Scotland Division, British Electricity Authority.
- Robert Sharp, Senior Executive Officer, Civil Service Commission.
- Alice Emily Shaw, Assistant Secretary, Lord Mayor's Private Office, City of London.
- James Davidson Drewette Shaw, Managing Director, James Kilpatrick & Son, Ltd., Electrical Engineers.
- Ernest Richard Shepherd, Senior Foreman of Factory, Admiralty.
- Arthur Hammond Shipley, Manager, Engineering Department, Dendex Brushes, Ltd., Chepstow, Monmouthshire.
- George Debney Shoosmith, Senior Executive Officer, Office of the Commissioners of Crown Lands.
- Leopold Augustus Leon Siffre, District Superintendent, Ministry of Transport & Civil Aviation, Mercantile Marine Office Service, Southampton.
- Colonel Reginald Jack Sims, MC, Retired Officer, War Office.
- Dorothy Singer Torry, Secretary to the Director-General, and Clerk to the Board of Governors, British Broadcasting Corporation.
- Cicely Ella Smart. For political and public services in Norfolk.
- John Edward Smart, JP, Chairman, Settle Rural District Food Control Committee.
- Frank Prichard Smith, Catering Manager, HM Dockyard, Devonport.
- Herbert Reginald Harry Smith, Clerk of Egham Urban District Council, Surrey.
- Stanley Joseph Wesley Snook, Higher Executive Officer, Board of Trade.
- Percy Frederick Thomas Snow, Senior Assistant, Ministry of Materials.
- Captain Geoffrey Wareing Spencer, Poultry Advisory Officer, Grade 1, National Agricultural Advisory Service.
- James Henry Spencer, lately Vice Chairman, Chatham Local Employment Committee, Kent.
- Geoffrey Newton Spring, Meals Organisation Officer, Ministry of Food.
- Captain Thomas Hall Conradi Squance, Member, North-Western Area Council, British Legion.
- Cyril William Stanbridge, Assistant Manager, Royal Ordnance Factory, Chorley.
- Arthur Frank Standen. For political and public services in Kent.
- Frank Rupert Stapley, Senior Executive Officer, Colonial Office.
- Frank John Stenning, lately Chief Executive Officer, Ministry of Food.
- Hubert Robert Stephens For political and public services in Gloucestershire.
- Mary Grace Stewart, Senior Mistress, High School for Girls, Swansea.
- William Bertie Stewart, Higher Executive Officer, Board of Trade.
- Madeline Loftus Stocker, Grade 5 Officer, Ministry of Labour & National Service.
- David Steven Strang, Farmer, East Berkshire.
- James Arthur Stringer, lately Production Officer, Board of Trade.
- John Irvine Swan, Secretary, Greenock Harbour Trust.
- William James Swann, Valuation Clerk, Higher Grade, Board of Inland Revenue.
- Ernest Stephen Tacagni, Inspector, Supplies Department, London County Council.
- Alfred Edwin Mess Taylor, JP, District Chairman of Auctioneers, Ministry of Food, Maud, Aberdeenshire.
- Basil Churton Taylor, Senior Executive Officer, Ministry of Food.
- Milton Whalley Taylor, lately Deputy Agricultural Attaché, Her Majesty's Embassy in Washington.
- Sibyl Adeline Thesiger, Head of the Welfare Department, Returned British Prisoners of War Association.
- John Lloyd Thomas, JP, Mayor of Llanfyllin Borough, Montgomeryshire.
- Captain Leonard Henry John Thompson, Master, MV Whitewing, General Steam Navigation Company, Ltd.
- James Simpson Thomson, Assistant Director, Commonwealth Bureau of Animal Nutrition.
- Elmira Thorpe, JP. For public services in the West Riding of Yorkshire.
- Major Noel Oughtred Till, Secretary and Treasurer, Forces Help Society and Lord Roberts Workshops, East Riding of Yorkshire.
- David Reid Todd, Naval Architect, John I. Thornycroft & Company, Ltd., Southampton.
- Frank Littler Tomkiss, Inspector of Taxes, Higher Grade, Board of Inland Revenue.
- Alfred Fairweather Tosh, Director and Works Manager, Summerson's Foundries, Ltd., Darlington.
- Roland Albert Frederick Hazell Towner, Esq., Senior Executive Officer, Home Office.
- Kathleen Traynor, Ward Sister, Rubery Mental Hospital, Birmingham.
- Nicholas Henry Tregedga, lately Senior Executive Officer, Ministry of Pensions & National Insurance.
- Ghuznee George True, MM, Head Postmaster, Walton-on-Thames and Weybridge, Surrey.
- Major Philip Ewen Caulfeild Tuckey, Private Secretary to the Commandant, Joint Services Staff College, Ministry of Defence.
- Leslie William Stokes Upton, Second Clerk, Judicial Committee, Privy Council Office.
- William Bell Scott Valentine, Honorary Secretary, Girvan Lifeboat Station, Ayrshire.
- Charles Ernest Vernon, Superintendent, East Riding of Yorkshire Constabulary.
- Henry Alfred Vickery, Senior Executive Officer, Home Office.
- Alfred Eber Vincent, Divisional Officer, No. 6 Division (West South Wales), Iron & Steel Trades Confederation.
- Christopher Hodgson Wainwright, Higher Executive Officer, Ministry of Transport & Civil Aviation.
- Ruby Brown Wallace, Clerical Officer, Scottish Home Department.
- Arthur Walls, Senior Executive Officer, Ministry of Pensions & National Insurance.
- Margaret Walters, Matron, Graig (Chronic Sick) Hospital, Pontypridd, Glamorgan.
- Miriam Beatrice Ward, Superintendent, Sandes Soldiers' Homes, Lisburn, County Antrim.
- Sarah Jane Gertrude Ware. For political and public services in South Shields.
- Stanley Mellor Warr, Works Manager, Peter Spence & Sons, Ltd., Widnes, Lancashire.
- Mildred Beatrice Waters, Higher Executive Officer, Department of Scientific & Industrial Research.
- Frederick William Andrew Waterson, Senior Contract Officer, Admiralty.
- Margaret Mary Watkins, District Nurse, Walwyns Castle and Little Haven, Pembrokeshire.
- Audrey West, Area Superintendent for Nursing Divisions, St. John Ambulance Brigade, South Western Area, No. 1 London District.
- Edward Henry West, Fishery Officer, Eastern Sea Fisheries Committee.
- John Selby West, Director of Welfare Services, South Shields County Borough Council, County Durham.
- Pauline Norah Wheatley, Superintendent Radiographer, Radiotherapy Department, Westminster Hospital.
- Arthur Whinnett, Senior Executive Officer, Office of HM Procurator General and Treasury Solicitor.
- Arthur James Cassels White, Higher Executive Officer, Board of Trade.
- Bulstrode Harry Whitelocke, Librarian, Lewisham Borough Council.
- John Arthur Wild, Chairman, Todmorden Local Employment Committee.
- Catherine Elizabeth Williams, Private Secretary to the Vice-President, Shipbuilding Employers' Federation.
- Maurice Lovel Burton Williams. For services Senior Executive Officer, British Army of the Rhine, War Office.
- George Henry Gordon Wills, Secretary, Southampton District, Shipping Federation, Ltd.
- Arthur Edward Wilson, Blind Persons Employment Officer, Ministry of Labour & National Service.
- James Wilson, Chief Driving Examiner, Ministry of Transport & Civil Aviation.
- John Wilson, General Works Manager, Blaw-Knox, Ltd., London.
- Marion Wince. For political and public services in Harrow.
- Edmund Alliston Wingrove, lately Managing Clerk, Baily Gibson & Company.
- Vernon Montagu Wood, Higher Executive Officer, Office of the Director of Public Prosecutions.
- Sidney Alfred Woodcock, MM, Pumping Station Engineer, Hampton Works, Metropolitan Water Board.
- Edward John Wright, lately Regional Coal Officer, Scottish Region, Ministry of Fuel & Power.
- Lieutenant-Colonel John George Coleman Perrett-Young, Chief Technical Administrator, British Joint Services Mission, Washington.
- George Holland Active, Control Officer Grade III, Control Commission for Germany (British Element).
- Jean Shaw Aiton, British subject resident in the United States of America.
- The Reverend Roger Grant Allison, Head of the Church of England Mission to the Jews, Jaffa.
- Ethel Rosa Edwards-Amati, Secretary to the British Council Representative in Rome.
- Joyce Bloxham, lately Headmistress of the English Girls' College, Alexandria.
- Oswald John Brandt, British subject resident in Haiti.
- Richard Burnett, BEM, Control Officer Grade III, Frontier Inspection Service, Control Commission for Germany (British Element).
- Philippe Camilleri. British subject resident in Algeria.
- Captain Harry Cross, MC, Market Officer at Her Majesty's Embassy in Montevideo.
- Lucy Katherine Mary Giudici, Passport Examiner at Her Majesty's Consulate General, Düsseldorf.
- Gerald Baldwin Hayward, British subject resident in Greece.
- Lucy Lydia Kenwood, Grade 6 Officer, Branch B of the Foreign Service at Her Majesty's Embassy in Paris.
- Denis John Horan, lately Chief Draughtsman, Sudan Railways.
- Elaine Dorothy James, Acting Executive Officer, Control Commission for Germany (British Element).
- Bernard Kelly, British Vice-Consul at Buenos Aires.
- Henry Newbold Lyster, Clerk at Her Majesty's Consulate-General at Istanbul.
- Charles Gommaire Overlaet, Her Majesty's Vice-Consul at Antwerp.
- Lady Gertrude Gwendoline Scott, British subject resident in Tangier.
- Joseph Spoor, lately Associate Professor at the Higher Training College, Bagdad.
- Charlotte Annie Stuart, MB BCh, Principal Medical Officer, Church Missionary Society Hospital, Cairo.
- Albert Victor Thornton, British subject resident in Switzerland.
- George Frederick Tizard, Grade 5 Officer, Branch B of the Foreign Service at Her Majesty's Embassy in Washington.
- Howard Bevan Ward, British subject resident in Denmark.
- John Watson, British subject resident in Cuba.
- John Leonard Wilkes, Manager of the British Bank of the Middle East at Kuwait.
- Howard Whitefield Willy, Assistant to the Commercial Secretary at Her Majesty's Embassy in Lima.
- Florence Elizabeth McKinley Wilson, Passport Examiner at Her Majesty's Embassy in Copenhagen.
- Nora Aitken, a member of various social welfare organisations connected with the United Kingdom community in Bombay, India.
- Olive Grant Burn. For services to the Hobart Repertory Society and the Theatre Royal, Hobart, State of Tasmania.
- Jane Burns, JP. For services to charitable organisations at Glenelg, South Australia
- Florence Evelyn Calder. For social welfare services in Southern Rhodesia.
- Benjamin Robert Cohen, General Manager, Manica Trading Company, Beira. For services to Southern Rhodesian interests at the port.
- Peter Tebbett Ensor, Secretary of the Central Administration of the United Kingdom Association in Pakistan.
- Anna Florence Greene, a Missionary in Chota Nagpur, Bihar, India, for 40 years.
- William Henry Ridge Gunner, Transport Officer, Central Mechanical Equipment Department, Southern Rhodesia.
- Daisy Ethel May Harvey, of Hobart, State of Tasmania. For services to patriotic and philanthropic movements.
- Geoffrey Houghton, Chief Technical Instructor, Radar Section, Technical Training College, Indian Air Force, Jalahalli, India.
- Louise Isobel Jearey, a member of the Loyal Women's Guild, Southern Rhodesia, for many years.
- Arnold Farish Benister Jones. For public services in the Sinoia District, Southern Rhodesia.
- John Knowles McGhie. For services to local government in the Fort Victoria District, Southern Rhodesia.
- Evelyn Elizabeth Mitchell, Vice-President of the Bulawayo and District Horticultural Society, Southern Rhodesia.
- Edward Greenwood Palmer, For social welfare services in Bulawayo, Southern Rhodesia.
- Chief Nkoebe Mitchell Peete, of Kolojane, Berea District, Basutoland.
- Florence Annie Perrin. For services to the Women's Branch of the Agricultural Bureau, State of South Australia.
- Eugene Schultz, a Deputy Sheriff, Enkeldoorn District, Southern Rhodesia.
- John Douglas Smith. For services to Local government in the Selukwe District, Southern Rhodesia.
- Kathleen Leonora Symons. For services to the Society for the Oversea Settlement of British Women.
- Dorothy Vaughan, a Member of the Children's Welfare and Public Relief Board, State of South Australia.
- Edward Stanley White, Town Clerk, Bulawayo, Southern Rhodesia.

Honorary

- Rasebolai Kgamane, BEM, Native Authority, Bamangwato Reserve, Bechuanaland Protectorate.
- Mobarak Ahmad son of Sher Mohamad, Colonial Police Service, Deputy Superintendent of Police, Federation of Malaya.
- Sigismund Ayodele Ajanaku, Administrative Assistant, Department of Statistics, Nigeria.
- Arnavaz Ardeshir Arjah. For public services in Zanzibar.
- Harold Edward Ashe, Superintendent, Advanced Approved School, Telok Mas, Malacca, Federation of Malaya.
- Robin Bain. For nursing services in Aden.
- Louis Baissac. For services to the British Red Cross Society in Mauritius.
- Frank William Beecham, Town Clerk, Kumasi Town Council, Gold Coast.
- Edward Rupert Burrowes. For services to art in British Guiana.
- James Hardie Candler, Colonial Administrative Service, District Officer, Kenya.
- Minnie Carlton. For services to education in North Borneo.
- Charles Caruana, Clerk, General Post Office, Gibraltar.
- John Casley, Chief Inspector of Works, Gold Coast.
- Hilda Margaret Cleaver, lately Matron, Colonial War Memorial Hospital, Fiji.
- Elizabeth Craill. For services to the blind in Nyasaland.
- John Alfred Cumber, Colonial Administrative Service, District Officer, Kenya.
- Darashaw Hornusji Daruwalla. For services to sport in Zanzibar.
- Andre d'Emmerez De Charmoy, Agricultural Officer, Mauritius.
- Ratu Jione Antonio Rabici Dovi, MB ChB., Medical Officer, British Solomon Islands Protectorate.
- Mabel Hilda Edmett. For public services in the Federation of Malaya.
- Goh Tan Teng, Clerk of Councils, Malacca, Federation of Malaya.
- Bruce Greatbatch, Colonial Administrative Service, Administrative Officer, Nigeria.
- Elise Ena Griffin. For nursing services in Northern Rhodesia.
- Francis Maximilian Grosse, Registrar of Marriages, Singapore.
- Lottie Hazeley. For services to women's education in Sierra Leone.
- William John James, Colonial Police Service, Superintendent of Police, Somaliland.
- Dorothy Jewitt. For nursing services in Nigeria.
- Parma Nand Joti, Colonial Police Service, Assistant Superintendent of Police, Tanganyika.
- Phyllis Kennedy. For services to the British Red Cross Society in Sarawak.
- Robert Henry Kennedy. For services to the Boy Scout Movement in Bermuda.
- Thomas Jay Lennard, Assistant Public Relations Officer, Tanganyika.
- Lim Kim Seng, JP. For public services in Singapore.
- John Robert Archibald McDonald, Acting Principal Auditor, Leeward Islands.
- Roy Maltby, Economic & Marketing Officer, Department of Commerce, Uganda.
- Joseph Joaquim Marinho, Magistrate, Nigeria.
- Theophilus Dougan Brodie-Mends, Administrative Officer, Nigeria.
- Munusamy Ramanujam Naidu, Assistant Commissioner for Labour (Indians), Selangor, Federation of Malaya.
- Josaia Navoka, lately Assistant Medical Practitioner, Fiji.
- Joseph Francis Nelson, JP. For public services in Trinidad.
- Vishnuprasad Balkrishna Pandit, LCPS, Senior Sub-Assistant Surgeon, Uganda.
- Saverimuthu Manuel Pillay, Acting Custodian of Enemy Property, Federation of Malaya.
- Pun Ku Kwai, lately Clerk, Secretariat, Hong Kong.
- Clarence Renwick, Superintendent of Works, Windward Islands.
- Ernest Rudolf Riegels. For public services to the East Africa High Commission.
- Newton Clyde Roberts, Assistant Registrar General, Bahamas.
- Jack Rose, DFC, Colonial Administrative Service, District Officer, Northern Rhodesia.
- Angela Mary Ryan, lately Secretary Typist, Nigeria.
- Ethel Joyce Saward, MRCS LRCP. For medical services in Jamaica.
- Nicos Schizas, Senior Laboratory Technician, Medical & Health Department, Cyprus.
- Mustafa Shemi, lately Administrative Assistant, Secretariat, Cyprus.
- The Reverend Canon Arthur Harry Smith, JP. For services to education in Northern Rhodesia.
- Gordon Miller Smith, Colonial Police Service, Senior Superintendent of Police, Kenya.
- Margaret Morrison Smith, Provincial Welfare Officer in Nyasaland.
- Charles Strange, Superintendent of Sanitary Services, Urban Services Department, Hong Kong.
- Rose Strong, Queen Elizabeth's Colonial Nursing Service, Matron, King Edward VII Memorial Hospital, Falkland Islands.
- Daniel George Tackie. For public services in the Gold Coast.
- Arthur Graeme Taylor, Colonial Audit Service, Principal Auditor, Sarawak.
- Henry Guy Thicthener, Senior Executive Officer, Office of the Crown Agents for the Colonies.
- Zaccheus John Cline Thomas, Deputy Shipping Master, Sierra Leone.
- Willoughby Harry Thompson, Colonial Administrative Service, District Officer, Kenya.
- Joan Gertrude Waddington, Cypher Clerk, East Africa High Commission.
- Charles Levi Westby. For public services in British Honduras.
- Ina Wilkie, Administrative Assistant, Secretariat, Northern Rhodesia.
- Arthur Stanley Wint. For services to sport in Jamaica.

Honorary

- Haji Ahmad bin Daud, District Officer, Kuala Belait, Brunei.
- Tombinte Dato Abdul Razak, Assistant Lady Supervisor, Vernacular Schools, Kedah, Federation of Malaya.
- Dato Abdul Hamid bin Dato Kaya Baduk, JP. For public services in the Federation of Malaya.
- Abdul Azizbin Haji Shukor, Executive Secretary, Johore State War Executive Committee, Federation of Malaya.
- Robert Udo Umo-Inyang. For public services in Nigeria.
- Abdul Salami Ebun Agbabiaka, Superintendent of Police, Nigeria.
- Mallam Abdullahi Maikano, Emir of Wase, Nigeria.
- Francis Bekewuru Ogu Kalanama, President of the Akugbene Native Court and Council, Nigeria.
- Anthony Obi Agusiobo, Chief Clerk, Public Works Department, Nigeria.
- Mallam Adi Byewi, Headmaster of Benue Middle School, Katsina-Ala, Nigeria.
- Ellis Tamunoipiriye Furo, Supervising Teacher, Education Department, Nigeria.
- Odofin Belo, Assistant Superintendent of Police, Nigeria.
- Alimami Jaia Kaikai, Paramount Chief of Panga Chiefdom, Pujehun District, Sierra Leone.
- Eria Paulo Engulu, Chief Judge, Teso District Native Court, Uganda.

=== Order of the Companions of Honour (CH) ===
- John Christie, MC. For services to Opera.

=== British Empire Medal (BEM) ===
Military Division

Navy

- Stores Petty Officer Badarudin bin Abdul Samad, S/M.2, Royal Malayan Navy.
- Chief Petty Officer Writer Eric Walter Barron, P/MX.67712.
- Chief Petty Officer Stoker Mechanic William Bright, D/KX.80751.
- Sergeant (Acting Colour Sergeant) Thomas Charles Butler, RM(V) 8495, RMFVR.
- Chief Petty Officer Stoker Mechanic Leonard Alfred Clark, P/KX.75149.
- Chief Shipwright Artificer Ernest Collins, P/MX.47871.
- Chief Aircraft Artificer Abram Dell, L/FX. 76787.
- Petty Officer George Bryan Fawcett, P/JX. 149838.
- Chief Radio Electrician Cecil Thomas Gough, D/MX.766274.
- Chief Wren (Quarters Assistant) Alice Ellen Marie Hawkins, 10836, Women's Royal Naval Service.
- Chief Petty Officer George Richard Holmes, C/J.106740.
- Sick Berth Chief Petty Officer Charles Ernest England Honey, P/MX.48671.
- Quartermaster Sergeant Harry Charles Hubbold, Po.X.2353, Royal Marines.
- Chief Petty Officer Ralph William Jackson, D/JX.135212.
- Stores Chief Petty Officer (S) Frederick Alan Jewell, D/MX.50210.
- Chief Petty Officer William Alfred Jones, BD/1496, RNVR.
- Sergeant (Acting Colour Sergeant) Michael Bernard McDermott, Ch.X.4458, Royal Marines.
- Sergeant Ronald McKenzie, Ply.X.1551, Royal Marines.
- Petty Officer Telegraphist Henry Arthur Narraway, DSM, P/JX.161496.
- Stores Chief Petty Officer (S) George Edward Oakes, P/MX.46850.
- Able Seaman William Henry Parker, C/J.86388.
- Chief Petty Officer Ronald James Paterson, P/JX.132012.
- Chief Petty Officer Edwin Douglas Redgrave, C/JX.135635.
- Chief Radio Electrician George Francis Rowbotham, C/MX.745781.
- Chief Petty Officer Cook (S) Albert Edward Simpkins, P/MX.48447.
- Acting Chief Radio Electrician Redvers John Anthony Small, DSM, P/MX.93199.
- Chief Petty Officer Earle Squire, P/J.108759.
- Chief Petty Officer Stoker Mechanic Harold George Swift, P/KX.80940.
- Chief Engine Room Artificer Sydney Norman Turner, D/MX.48985.
- Chief Petty Officer Sidney Edgar Walsh, D. S. M., D/JX.140043.
- Engine Room Artificer 2nd Class Lawrence Bernard Woodcock, C/MX.66087.

Army

- No.7667222 Staff-Sergeant Sidney Bailey, Royal Army Pay Corps.
- No.21023076 Sergeant Clifford James Elliott Bearne, Royal Corps of Signals.
- No.1876881 Battery Quartermaster-Sergeant (Acting) James Henry Victor Benton, Royal Regiment of Artillery.
- No.7263958 Staff-Sergeant (now Warrant Officer Class II) Hugh McDonald Bishop, Royal Army Medical Corps.
- No.22236306 Staff-Sergeant Percy John Bolam, Corps of Royal Engineers, Territorial Army.
- No.1411103 Gunner John Joseph Carr, Royal Regiment of Artillery, Territorial Army.
- No.21192056 Sergeant (Artillery Clerk) Frank Stephen Court, Royal Regiment of Artillery, Territorial Army.
- No.S/14500502 Warrant Officer Class II (Acting) Kenneth McDonald Cowdy, Royal Army Service Corps.
- No.2608037 Colour Sergeant (Acting) Percy Henry Croucher, Grenadier Guards.
- No.410686 Staff-Sergeant Harold James Davies, Royal Tank Regiment, Royal Armoured Corps.
- No.NA/26382 Regimental Sergeant-Major Ladi Demsa, The Nigeria Regiment, Royal West African Frontier Force.
- No.2346605 Sergeant Harry Charles Farmer, Royal Corps of Signals.
- No.2028200 Warrant Officer Class II (Acting) Ivor Henry Gale, Army Physical Training Corps.
- No.22281120 Corporal Robert Garratt, Corps of Royal Military Police, Territorial Army.
- No.2690656 Sergeant Richard Frank George, Scots Guards.
- No.2321377 Warrant Officer Class II (Acting) Thomas German, Royal Corps of Signals.
- No.65683 Staff-Sergeant Keith Gordon Kilpatrick Gray, Intelligence Corps.
- No.5380938 Warrant Officer Class II (Acting) Kenneth Gregg, The Royal Warwickshire Regiment.
- No.2692119 Sergeant Parmenas George Grigg, Scots Guards.
- No.22206538 Sergeant James Hawthorne, 1st/2nd Lothians & Border Horse, Royal Armoured Corps, Territorial Army.
- No.5663598 Squadron Quartermaster-Sergeant Charles Hill, The Royal Wiltshire Yeomanry (Prince of Wales's Own), Royal Armoured Corps, Territorial Army.
- No.W/32417 Sergeant Gwendolyn Iris Holmes, Women's Royal Army Corps.
- No.5047412 Sergeant Maurice Frederick Howell, The North Staffordshire Regiment (The Prince of Wales's).
- No.22524110 Staff-Sergeant (Acting) Arthur Morley Hughes, Royal Army Pay Corps.
- No.4385043 Sergeant Leonard Charles Jackson, The Green Howards (Alexandra, Princess of Wales's Own Yorkshire Regiment), Territorial Army.
- No.806932 Sergeant Leonard Thomas George Jelley, Royal Regiment of Artillery, Territorial Army.
- No.Ga/10166 Company Sergeant-Major Ousman Jobe, The Gambia Regiment, Royal West African Frontier Force.
- No.399354 Squadron Quartermaster-Sergeant William Alfred Knott, The Shropshire Yeomanry, Royal Armoured Corps, Territorial Army.
- No.21143002 Warrant Officer Class II (Acting) Krishnadass Rai, 2nd King Edward VII's Own Gurkha Rifles.
- No.2547540 Warrant Officer Class H (Acting) Arthur Searle Lang, Corps of Royal Engineers.
- No.809640 Sergeant Edward Thomas Lawley, Army Catering Corps.
- No.S/22280918 Sergeant John Henry Lewis, Royal Army Service Corps.
- No.W/107565 Staff-Sergeant Joan Mansell, Women's Royal Army Corps.
- No.6398414 Company Quartermaster-Sergeant Leonard George Marchant, Small Arms School Corps.
- No.7338949 Sergeant Joseph Maudsley, Royal Regiment of Artillery, Territorial Army.
- No.21129459 Sergeant (Artillery Clerk) Bartholomew Gerard McPolan, Royal Regiment of Artillery, Territorial Army.
- No.22279788 Sergeant James Percival Moore, Royal Regiment of Artillery, Territorial Army.
- No.779272 Sergeant Archibald Burrell Morrison, Royal Regiment of Artillery.
- No.1878271 Sergeant Charles Joseph Noblet, Corps of Royal Engineers.
- No.22533369 Warrant Officer Class I (Acting) Robert Henry Page, Corps of Royal Electrical & Mechanical Engineers.
- No.S/19097051 Warrant Officer Class II (Acting) Anthony Alfred Charles Phillips, Royal Army Service Corps.
- No.1868288 Warrant Officer Class II (Acting) George Frederick Leonard Price, Corps of Royal Engineers.
- No.3957908 Warrant Officer Class II (Acting) Leslie Peter Priest, Royal Army Ordnance Corps.
- No.3310982 Sergeant John Morrison Reid, The Highland Light Infantry (City of Glasgow Regiment), Territorial Army.
- No.L/NCA/8504 Warrant Officer Class II (Acting) Luther Augustus Smith, The Jamaica Battalion.
- No.S/22219256 Staff-Sergeant Clifford Woodall Sparkes, Royal Army Service Corps, Territorial Army.
- No.W/346719 Sergeant Sheila Gwenllian Vickerage, Women's Royal Army Corps, Territorial Army.
- No.277627 Warrant Officer Class I (Acting) (ASM) Edward Webster, Corps of Royal Electrical & Mechanical Engineers.
- No.22278104 Sergeant John James Williams, Royal Regiment of Artillery, Territorial Army.
- No.1056592 4 Warrant Officer Class II (Acting) Robert George Willis, Royal Army Ordnance Corps.
- No.S/68978 Warrant Officer Class H (Acting) Walter James Dennis Wood, Royal Army Service Corps.

Air Force

- 2689500 Flight Sergeant William Lewis Agate, Royal Auxiliary Air Force.
- 621611 Flight Sergeant John Beale.
- 631121 Flight Sergeant Edward George Dickson.
- 423010 Flight Sergeant Phyllis Gillatt, WRAF.
- 512267 Flight Sergeant John Gladding.
- 567907 Flight Sergeant Arthur James Hodge.
- 566644 Flight Sergeant Arthur Chapman Kilburn.
- 506658 Flight Sergeant Richard Tom Archibald Medway.
- 647199 Flight Sergeant Francis James David Murray.
- 569050 Flight Sergeant Frederick John Savell.
- 572693 Flight Sergeant Desmond Arthur Sear.
- 573755 Flight Sergeant Ronald Seeley.
- 567317 Flight Sergeant Leslie Arthur Tovey.
- 541786 Flight Sergeant John Robert Trotter.
- 505983 Flight Sergeant (now Acting Warrant Officer) Thomas Edwin Ward.
- 548137 Flight Sergeant Douglas James Waterman.
- 591064 Flight Sergeant John Hubert Williams.
- 571061 Flight Sergeant John Madog Williams.
- 574048 Flight Sergeant John Francis Wort.
- 995092 Acting Flight Sergeant Archibald Dunlop.
- 531659 Acting Flight Sergeant Lawrence Waterworth Greenwood.
- 641830 Sergeant William Ronald Bradford.
- 611558 Sergeant Charles Eric Conduit.
- 577619 Sergeant Dennis William Hill.
- 1829913 Sergeant James McArthur.
- 908243 Sergeant Eric Middleton.
- 2070865 Sergeant Florence Northcott, Women's Royal Air Force.
- 538317 Sergeant Candry Albert Charles Pithers.
- 2684511 Sergeant George Wilson, Royal Auxiliary Air Force.
- 4027972 Corporal John Stephen Hunter.

Civil Division

United Kingdom.

- Thomas Henry Ivor Adams, Mains Foreman, Plymouth District, Devon Sub-Area, South Western Electricity Board.
- Robert Addison, Process Worker, Royal Ordnance Factory, Chorley.
- Joseph Adkins, Market Gardener, Banbury.
- Frank Allen, Inspector, Engineering Department, Head Post Office, Boston.
- Frank Riddle Anderson, Verger, Royal Garrison Church, Aldershot.
- Joseph Ashcroft, Process Worker, Royal Ordnance Factory, Chorley.
- Sidney Askew, Installations Inspector, Stretford District, Manchester Group, North Western Gas Board.
- Arthur John Bailey, Head Police Warder, British Museum.
- Edward Herman Bailey, Warden, Territorial Army Centre, Suffolk.
- Doris Baldwin, JP, Member, Women's Voluntary Services, North Riding of Yorkshire.
- Arthur Barker, Checker, Hull, Railway Executive, North Eastern Region.
- Doris Beadle, Senior Chief Supervisor (F), London Telecommunications Region.
- George Beaumont, Pitbank Weighman, Grange Ash Colliery, North Eastern Division, National Coal Board.
- Frederick Benbow, Tractor Driver, Montgomery Agricultural Executive Committee.
- Albert Arthur Bishop, CGM, Storekeeper, Bloomfields Ltd., Great Yarmouth.
- John Thomas Bolas, Overman, Hilton Main Colliery, West Midlands Division, National Coal Board.
- John Francis Bonnet, lately District Fitter Foreman, Lea Bridge District, North Thames Gas Board.
- William Edwin Bridge, Assistant, Investigation Branch, General Post Office.
- Joseph William Brookes, MM, Technical Officer, Telephone Manager's Office, Gloucester.
- Sidney Brooks, Sugar Warehouse Chargehand, British Sugar Corporation Ltd., Kidderminster.
- Charles Henry Brown, Supervising Instructor, Class I, No. 2 Radio School, Yatesbury.
- Thomas Brownlie, Section Leader, Lanarkshire Area Fire Brigade.
- Charles Ernest Burrage, Principal Keeper, Withernsea Lighthouse, Corporation of Trinity House.
- George Arthur Burrows, Senior Foreman, Bruntons (Musselburgh) Ltd., Musselburgh.
- Thomas Carmichael, Substation Attendant, Fife Sub Area, South East Scotland Electricity Board.
- William Carr, Cloth Looker, Richard Haworth & Company Ltd., Salford.
- John Carson, Constable, Ulster Special Constabulary.
- Anne Cator, Area Organiser, Norfolk, Women's Voluntary Services.
- Horace Lennox Chalcraft, Chief Cook, Royal Naval College, Greenwich.
- Henry Thomas Chapman, Chargehand Fitter, Barnsley Power Station, Yorkshire Division, British Electricity Authority.
- Matthew Charlton, Engineman, Steam Trawler Trumpeter (A.379).
- James Joseph Charnley, Chargehand Electrical Fitter, Ribble Power Station, North Western Division, British Electricity Authority.
- James Clark, Station Officer, HM Coastguard, Kirkwall.
- James Christopher Russell Cochrane, Head Constable, Royal Ulster Constabulary.
- Stanley Cogman, Production Manager, Wire Netting Department, Boulton & Paul Ltd., Norwich.
- Cornelius Sallu Cole, Foreman of Works, West Africa Command, War Office.
- Thomas H. Coleman, Deputy, North Celynen Colliery, South Western Division, National Coal Board.
- Joseph Edward Colley, Turner and Borer, Lancashire Dynamo & Crypto Ltd., Manchester.
- Thomas Albert Colley, Ladle Carriage Driver, Park Gate Iron and Steel Company Ltd., Rotherham.
- Bertie Vincent Cook, lately Foreman Stoker, London Division, British Electricity Authority.
- Leonard Cottingham, lately School Staff Instructor, Oundle School, Northampton.
- Dorothy Alice Clara Courtney, Deputy County Organiser, South Middlesex, Women's Voluntary Services.
- Catherine Clarkson Craig, Member of Centre Staff, Glasgow, Women's Voluntary Services.
- Thomas Crisp, Warehouse Foreman, T. Pryce Hamer Ltd., Llanidloes, Montgomeryshire.
- Ian Allister Crombie, Boatswain, MV Tahsinia, Anchor Line.
- John Herbert Cropper, Supervisor, British Extracting Company Ltd., Bromborough, Cheshire.
- William George Thomas Darton, Office Keeper, Maritime Headquarters, Pitreavie.
- Reginald Dent, Rescue Brigademan, Durham Division, National Coal Board.
- Alfred James Denton, Foreman, Army Medical Equipment Depot, Ludgershall.
- Charles Dobson, Spinning Overlooker, J. & J. Crombie Ltd., Aberdeen.
- James William Dodds, Leading Technical Officer, Post Office Telephone Exchange, West Hartlepool.
- Walter Dominey, Acting Foreman of Manufacture, Admiralty.
- Michael Smith Drummond, Shaftsman, Blairmuckhill Colliery, Scottish Division, National Coal Board.
- William England, Inside Works Foreman, Hamilton Robb Ltd., Portadown, County Armagh.
- Harry Stanley Evans, Carpenter, SS Ixion, Alfred Holt & Company, Liverpool.
- George Samuel Everest, Resident Office Keeper, Church Commission.
- Edwin Alexander Farenden, Inspector, Signal & Telecommunications Department Railway Executive, Southern Region.
- Leslie Farmer, Chief Inspector, West Riding of Yorkshire Constabulary.
- Thomas Farnan, Safety Supervisor, Bartram & Sons Ltd., Sunderland.
- John Flanagan, Assistant Steward, SS Lairdscraig, Burns & Laird Lines Ltd., Glasgow.
- John Frederick Fleming, Station Officer, Norfolk Fire Brigade.
- William Edward Burdett Fletcher, Machine Tool Maker, Raleigh Industries Ltd., Nottingham.
- Charles Francis Flintoft, Chargehand, Ancient Monuments Branch, Ministry of Works.
- Arthur Frayne, Research & Experimental Mechanic, Royal Aircraft Establishment, Farnborough.
- Charles William Gale, Electrical Engineer, NAAFI.
- Frederick Edward Garland, Inspector, Southampton Borough Police Force.
- Charles William Gascoigne, District Inspector, Sheffield Undertaking, East Midlands Gas Board.
- Francis Leslie George, Chargehand, J.& H. McLaren Ltd., Staines.
- William Gleave, Substation Attendant, Merseyside & North Wales Electricity Board.
- Harold Raymond Godbold, Shed Foreman, Richard Hodgson & Sons Ltd., Beverley.
- Charles Gratton, Chief Inspector, Head Post Office, Manchester.
- Alfred Green, lately Foreman, Hilger & Watts Ltd., London.
- George Henry Green, Toolroom Foreman, A. Kershaw & Sons, Leeds.
- Herbert James Grewcock, Civilian Instructor, HM Borstal Institution, Portland.
- Haydn Griffiths, Sergeant, Mid-Wales Constabulary.
- Harry Hallam, Brick Moulder, G. Tucker & Son Ltd., Loughborough.
- Thomas Halshaw, Process Worker, Royal Ordnance Factory, Chorley.
- Charles William Hammond, Inspector, Postal, Fareham, Hampshire.
- Walter George Hammond, Platers Marker Off, Vickers-Armstrongs Ltd., Crayford, Kent.
- Ernest Charles Harris, Furnaceman, Capper Pass and Son Ltd., Bristol.
- Frank Harvey, Engineer, Technical Grade II, Royal Aircraft Establishment, Farnborough.
- Khan Sahib Muhammad Hashim, Dragoman, Her Majesty's Embassy, Baghdad.
- Jane Hellings, Honorary Collector, Savings Group, Stithians, Truro.
- George Hemsworth, Fireman, London Fire Brigade.
- William Henderson, Foreman, Law & Burns Ltd., South Shields.
- Henry Joseph Hiatt, Station Warden, Royal Air Force, Digby.
- Percy William Holland, lately Assistant Superintendent, Eastern Central District Office, General Post Office. For services to the Post Office Orphan Homes Institution.
- William John Hollis, Supervising Instructor Supervisor, No. 2 School of Technical Training, Royal Air Force, Cosford.
- Eunice Holt, Ward Leader, Bradford, Women's Voluntary Services.
- Harry Evelyn Holt, Stores Foreman, War Office, Chilwell.
- Stephen Seager Hopkins, Assistant Supervisor, Edinburgh Division, Scottish Gas Board.
- Arthur Huish, Chargehand Carpenter, C. W. Addicott & Son, Weston-Super-Mare.
- Thomas Jarratt, Leading Architectural Assistant, War Office.
- Ellen Elizabeth Johnson, Honorary Collector, Street Savings Group, Eccles, Manchester.
- Frank Johnson, District Inspector, Scarborough Gas Undertaking, North Eastern Gas Board.
- Margaret Johnston, Honorary Collector, Street Savings Group, Alnwick, Northumberland.
- Charles William Jones, Overman, Bedwas Colliery, South Western Division, National Coal Board.
- Violet Maud Jones, Honorary Collector, Street Saving Groups, Bridgend, Glamorganshire.
- John Thomas Jordan, Member, Coast Life Saving Corps, Nell's Point, Barry.
- William Kenny, Postman, Head Post Office, Stockport.
- John James Donald Kerry, Area First Aid Superintendent, Durham Division, National Coal Board.
- Walter Langley, Mason, Rutland Masonry Works Ltd., Peterborough.
- Harold Leader, Head of Sampling Department, Atkins Bros. (Hinckley) Ltd.
- Geoffrey Wells Leaper, Foreman Fitter, South Eastern Electricity Board.
- Richard John William Lees, Crane Driver, North Wilford Power Station, East Midlands Division, British Electricity Authority.
- Percy John Lethbridge, Quantity Surveyor's Assistant, War Office.
- Kenneth Alfred Levack, Permanent Labourer, Port of London Authority.
- William Oscar John Lockett, lately Sub-Inspector, Ministry of Civil Aviation Constabulary.
- Wilfred Lunn, Superintendent, Docks and Running Shed, Aldershot & District Traction Company Ltd.
- Thomas Robertson McCall, Checker, Commercial Department, Ardeer Factory, Ayrshire.
- Richard Roy McCrow, Barrack Store Accountant, War Office.
- Ezekil McCullough, Foreman, Command Ordnance Depot, War Office, Kinnegar.
- Andrew McCurrach, Workshop Foreman, Commissioners of Northern Lighthouses.
- Ian Cuthbert MacGregor, Aerodrome Fire Officer, Grade 1, Ministry of Transport & Civil Aviation.
- William McLaren, Leading Technical Officer, Post Office Radio Station, Cupar.
- Albert McWilliam, Chief Observer, Post D.2, Aberdeen, No. 29 Group, Royal Observer Corps.
- Rhoda Massey, Member, Women's Voluntary Services, Manchester.
- Ernest Henry Matthews, Chief Officer, Class I, HM Prison Maidstone.
- Herbert Charles Albert Mercer, Blind Telephone Operator, Cambridge Employment Exchange, Ministry of Labour & National Service.
- George Donald Mieras, Senior Sergeant, Mechanised Special Constabulary, City of Edinburgh Police.
- Henry Edward Moon, Refrigerator Attendant, SS Samaria, Cunard Steamship Company Ltd., Liverpool.
- Edwin Lillicrap Moore, Senior Inspecting Officer, Admiralty.
- William John Mothersdale, Supervisor, Grade II, Control Commission for Germany, Cologne.
- Robert Muir, Chief Engineer, Prestonlinks Colliery, Scottish Division, National Coal Board.
- Gertrude Murphy, Honorary Collector, Street Savings Group, Mold, Flintshire.
- Ann Dorothy Newby, Storewoman, Ministry of Food.
- Thomas Arthur Newsome, Dataller, Mitchell Main Colliery, North Eastern Division, National Coal Board.
- William Daniel Nicholls, Road Foreman, County Surveyor's Department, Gloucestershire County Council.
- Thomas Hutchinson Ogle, Coal Filler, Shilbottle Colliery, Northern (Northumberland & Cumberland) Division, National Coal Board.
- Richard Anthony O'Neill, Deputy Chief Warder, Allied Nationals Prison, Werl, British Zone of Germany.
- Edith O' Shaughnessy, Forewoman, Splint Covering Department, Royal Cripples Hospital, Birmingham.
- Thomas Page, lately Underground Road Worker, Denby Drury Lowe Colliery, East Midlands Division, National Coal Board.
- Thomas Wilfred Painter, Mill Superintendent, Swansea, Imperial Chemical Industries Ltd., Metals Division.
- Stanley Edwards Peck, Chief Inspector, Metropolitan Police.
- William Henry Petherick, Artificer, HMS Vernon.
- Edgar William Phillips, Postman, Wandsworth Sub-District Post Office.
- Dorothy Pipe, Overseer (F), Seven Kings Branch Post Office, Ilford.
- Charles Posford, Head Gardener, French District, Imperial War Graves Commission.
- Frank Leslie Powell, Depot Manager, Brockley Lane Depot G.N., House Coal Distribution (Emergency) Scheme.
- Albert John Pratt, Senior Chief Supervisor (M), London Telecommunications Region.
- John Charles Francis Prendergrast, Telephone Switchboard Operator and Doorkeeper, Territorial Army Drill Hall, Liverpool.
- Robert Reginald Purser, Commandant, Buckinghamshire Special Constabulary.
- William Henry Pym, Mechanic Examiner, Inspectorate of Armaments, Ministry of Supply.
- David Queay, Leading-Hand Fitter, Railway Executive, Scottish Region.
- Jane Alexandra Dickson Quigley, Supervisor (F), Post Office Telephone Exchange, Belfast.
- Joseph Reid, Onsetter, Wigan Junction Colliery, North Western Division, National Coal Board.
- David Brinley Richards, Under-Foreman, Girling Ltd., Cwmbran, Monmouthshire.
- William Oswald Richardson, Sub-Officer, Huntingdonshire Fire Brigade.
- Sidney Ringwald, Electrical Engineer, British Resin Products Ltd., Barry.
- Winifred Edith Rissik, Deputy County Organiser, Rutland, Women's Voluntary Services.
- James William Robinson, Foreign Office, London.
- Adam Rogerson, Agricultural Blacksmith, Stocksfield, Northumberland.
- Eli David Rollings, School Staff Instructor, Reading School, Berkshire.
- Archibald David Rutland, Stores Superintendent, No. 7 Maintenance Unit, Royal Air Force, Quedgeley.
- Edward Ronald Sellars, Foreman Electrician, Ransome & Marles Bearings Company Ltd., Newark-on-Trent.
- Frederick Albert Tom Sewell, General Works Foreman, Flathouse Gas Works, Portsmouth, Southern Gas Board.
- John Shaw, Transport and Garage Foreman, Horsley, Smith & Company Ltd., Hull.
- Robert Albert Shepherd, Template Maker, Cravens Railway Carriage & Wagon Company Ltd., Sheffield.
- Amelia Fanny Sims, Honorary Collector, Parish Savings Group, Madeley.
- William Henry Smalley, Propeller Moulder, Harper Phillips Company Ltd., Grimsby.
- Fred Smith, Colliery Head Electrician, Langton Colliery, East Midlands Division, National Coal Board.
- William George Sparkes, Postman, Higher Grade, Birmingham.
- Frederick William Spilling, Comptroller of Supplies, Savoy Hotel, London.
- George Robert Squires, Office Keeper, Grade III, Ministry of Pensions & National Insurance.
- Walter Scott Stagey, Planer, Royal Ordnance Factories, Woolwich.
- Frank William Stevens, Technical Officer, Head Post Office, Birmingham.
- Adam Haldone Strath, Cook, SS Gothland, Currie Line Ltd.
- Frank Stringer, Colliery Checkweighman, Rothwell Colliery, North Eastern Division, National Coal Board.
- Thomas William Sumner, Senior and General Foreman, Redheugh Gas Works, Gateshead-on-Tyne, Northern Gas Board.
- Chiu-Wing Tam, Local Clerk, Grade I, HM Dockyard, Hong Kong.
- Albert George Taylor, Farm Manager, Carnwath, Department of Agriculture for Scotland.
- Margaret Reid Taylor, Chief Supervisor (F), Post Office Telephone Exchange, Edinburgh.
- David Edward Alexander Thomson, Maintenance Staff Foreman, T. & H. Smith Ltd., Edinburgh.
- James Thomson, Principal Store Officer, HM Prison Edinburgh.
- Samuel Thomas Swinnerton Train, Acting Inspector of Engine Fitters, Admiralty.
- William Trotter, Datal Worker, Washington 'F' Colliery, Durham Division, National Coal Board.
- Edith Turner, Honorary Collector, Street Savings Groups, High Wycombe, Buckinghamshire.
- Gilbert Lucius Turner, Chief Observer, Post J.3, Beckenham, No. 1 Group, Royal Observer Corps.
- John Francis Tyrer, Charge-Hand Fitter, Vulcan Foundry Ltd., Newton-Le-Willows.
- John George Vallance, Overman-in-Charge, Brodsworth Main Colliery, North Eastern Division, National Coal Board.
- Elsie Mary Wales, Assistant Supervisor (Telegraphs), Post Office, Chatham.
- James F. Wallace, Honorary Collector, Street Savings Group, Belfast.
- Louis William Watson, Head Storekeeper, Ministry of Transport & Civil Aviation, Liverpool.
- Clement Welton, Head Gardener, North-West European District, Imperial War Graves Commission.
- James Aaron White, Mechanical Engineer, East Greenwich Works, South Eastern Gas Board.
- Gordon Wilkins, Experimental Mechanician, McMichael Radio Ltd., Slough.
- John Henry Williams, Deputy, Llanhilleth Steam Colliery, South Western Division, National Coal Board.
- Robert Williams, Planning Engineer, Newton, Chambers & Company Ltd., Thorncliffe.
- Hector Donald Wilmot, Head Chancery Guard, Her Majesty's Embassy, Vienna.
- Edwin Wilson, Maintenance Foreman, Synthetic Ammonia Plant, Prudhoe.
- George William Woodcock, Senior Inspector of Custodians, Lord Great Chamberlain's Department, House of Lords.
- Robert Wright, Chief Engineer of a Steam Trawler, Swansea.
- William Wyatt, Chargehand Toolmaker, Park Bros. Ltd., Blackburn.
- Eric Joseph Yates, Works Technical, Grade II, RAF Marham.

Southern Rhodesia.

- George Evelyn Pennell, Commissionaire-in-Charge, Office of the Governor of Southern Rhodesia.

Colonial Empire.

- George Ioannou Karanikis, Head Chauffeur, Government House, Cyprus.
- Spyros Andrea Protopapas, Chief Foreman Village Roads, Nicosia, Kyrenia District, Cyprus.
- Koduvayur Ananthanarayana Iyer Chattanathan, Technical Assistant, Survey Office, Muar, Johore, Federation of Malaya.
- Chin Peng Leong, Senior Assistant, Department of Adviser on Aborigines, Federation of Malaya.
- Haji Ibrahim bin Sheikh Yahaya, Chief Revenue Officer, Customs Department, Johore Bahru, Federation of Malaya.
- Ismal bin Haji Ali, Permanent Staff Instructor, Home Guard, Mukim of Bangau, Pahang, Federation of Malaya.
- Kontik Kamariah binti Ahmad, Assistant Supervisor of Malay Girls' Schools, Selangor, Federation of Malaya.
- Khoo Paik Wan, Manager, Pakloh Estate, Kluang, Johore, Federation of Malaya.
- Khoo Soo Saik, Chinese Translator, Police Headquarters, Penang, Federation of Malaya.
- Kulop Manas bin Dawan, Headman, Lasah, Perak, Federation of Malaya.
- Lum Ah Hoi, Workshop Foreman, Malayan Railway, Federation of Malaya.
- Arumugam Namasivayam, Station Master, Bahau, Negri Sembilan, Federation of Malaya.
- Phua Thian Ern, Chairman of Village Committee, Parit Yaani, Batu Pahat, Johore, Federation of Malaya.
- Thangavelu s/o Amurtham, Chief Clerk, Sitiawan Police District Headquarters, Perak, Federation of Malaya.
- James Matthew Abraham, Supervisor, Printing Department, Gambia.
- Ephraim Githae Mithamo, Assistant District Officer, South Tetu Division, Kenya.
- Joseph George Mulama, President, Kakamega African Court of Appeal, Kenya.
- Kariuki Ndorongo, African Chief Warder, HM Prison, Nairobi, Kenya.
- Chief Musa Nyandusi, Special Grade Chief, Nyaribari Location, Kenya.
- Jiwan Bhima, Acting Principal Officer, Prisons Department, Mauritius.
- Thomas Amafrey, Master, River Ferry Boat Eket, Calabar, Nigeria.
- Emanuel Ajayi Fapuro, Foreman (Fitter), Marine Department, Nigeria.
- Nelson Duff Gongonya, Postmaster, Monze Sub-Post Office, Northern Rhodesia.
- Noanga Mubita, Jeanes Supervisor, Barotseland, Northern Rhodesia.
- Lily Warren, Midwife, Pitcairn Island.
- Emily Carew, Temporary Staff Nurse, Nursing Service, Sierra Leone.
- Jirdeh Ahamed, Inspector of Police, Somaliland Protectorate.
- Ramadhani Mzee Hemedi, African Teacher, Junior Service, Department of Education, Tanganyika.
- Benedictus Joseph Labre Mato, Secretary and Treasurer to the Council of Chiefs of South Mara, Tanganyika.
- Wakili Bakari Mwinyikambi, Acting Chief of Bahi, Dodoma District, Tanganyika.
- Sultan Mohamed Shariff, Assistant Press Engineer, Government Press, Tanganyika.
- Redvers Buller Gill, Forest Supervisor, Trinidad.
- Rajabu Ibrahim, Senior Hunter Overseer, Tsetse Control Department, Uganda.
- Masoud Juma, Machinist, Government Press, Zanzibar Protectorate.

=== Royal Red Cross (RRC) ===
- Major Lois Elaine Thompson (206484), Queen Alexandra's Royal Army Nursing Corps.
- Wing Officer Alice Lowrey, ARRC (405062), Princess Mary's Royal Air Force Nursing Service.
- Squadron Officer Elsie Maltman, ARRC (405108), Princess Mary's Royal Air Force Nursing Service.

==== Associate of the Royal Red Cross (ARRC) ====
- Edna Nellie Georgina Gill, Superintending Sister, Queen Alexandra's Royal Naval Nursing Service.
- Cynthia Felicity Joan Cooke, Senior Nursing Sister, Queen Alexandra's Royal Naval Nursing Service.
- Q/1000009 Corporal Elizabeth Kathleen Gallant, Queen Alexandra's Royal Army Nursing Corps.
- Major Sarah Annie Raine (209154), Queen Alexandra's Royal Army Nursing Corps.
- Captain Muriel Helen Rundle (241018), Queen Alexandra's Royal Army Nursing Corps.

=== Air Force Cross (AFC) ===
- Group Captain Denis Aymard Wilson, MRCS LRCP.
- Wing Commander Thomas Balmforth, DSO DFC (41363).
- Wing Commander Ronald Noel Hamilton Courtney, DFC (70852).
- Wing Commander James Baird Coward (39412).
- Wing Commander Geoffrey Howard Dhenin, GM MB ChB (138384).
- Wing Commander Frederick Desmond Hughes, DSO DFC (74706).
- Wing Commander John Thornhill Shaw, DSO DFC (108962).
- Wing Commander William Alexander Smith, DFC (40026).
- Wing Commander Clive Stanley George Stanbury, DSO DFC (41808).
- Wing Commander James Wallace, DSO DFC (40868).
- Acting Wing Commander Michael Henry Lebas, DSO (104423).
- Squadron Leader Eric George Alcock (144628)
- Squadron Leader Robert Anthony Carson, MC (144937).
- Squadron Leader Peter Hunt Cleaver, DFC (103590).
- Squadron Leader Colin Weall Coulthard (104469).
- Squadron Leader Ivor Derik Crozier (127841).
- Squadron Leader John Francis Jerome Dewhurst, DFC (130872).
- Squadron Leader Douglas Stewart Dickins (41681).
- Squadron Leader Peter Erskine Vaughan-Fowler, DSO DFC (110008).
- Squadron Leader Wilfred Ronald Gellatly (59332).
- Squadron Leader Arthur Hudson, DFC (48758), RAuxAF.
- Squadron Leader Walter Noel Kenyon (88395).
- Squadron Leader David Cecil Hugh Simmons (123016).
- Squadron Leader Frederick Beresford Sowrey (107942).
- Acting Squadron Leader Bertram Beard (53100).
- Acting Squadron Leader Douglas William Butler (141355).
- Acting Squadron Leader John McRae Cormack (193473), RAuxAF.
- Acting Squadron Leader Desmond De Villiers (182001), RAuxAF.
- Acting Squadron Leader Ronald Frank Hitchcock (52019).
- Acting Squadron Leader Keith Hadland Perry, DSO (162948).
- Acting Squadron Leader John Henry Rogers (153678).
- Acting Squadron Leader Reggie John Spilman Spooner (153525).
- Flight Lieutenant Ronald Albert Edward Allen (187693).
- Flight Lieutenant Charles Gordon Bailey (55161).
- Flight Lieutenant Douglas Stuartson Bell, DFC (132618).
- Flight Lieutenant Benjamin Burton (150645).
- Flight Lieutenant Ernest Sydney Chandler (3039492).
- Flight Lieutenant James Corbishley (501774).
- Flight Lieutenant Ernest Alwyn Jackson Crooks (1499559).
- Flight Lieutenant Timothy William Fane Desalis (58130).
- Flight Lieutenant Donald Herbert Gannon, DFC (154643).
- Flight Lieutenant Victor George Gibbard (54904) (Retired).
- Flight Lieutenant William Noel Gilmer (182613).
- Flight Lieutenant Newton Francis Harrison, DSO (502184).
- Flight Lieutenant Leonard George Holden (181447).
- Flight Lieutenant Eric Edward Hopkins (52809).
- Flight Lieutenant Raymond Gordon Iles (53839).
- Flight Lieutenant Walter Dowse Jarvis (53990).
- Flight Lieutenant Duncan McIntosh (144397), RAuxAF.
- Flight Lieutenant Anthony Basil Mercer (188288). RAuxAF.
- Flight Lieutenant John Stanhope Jervoise Hamilton-Martin (175402).
- Flight Lieutenant Ronald Charles Norris (186937).
- Flight Lieutenant Peter. Eric Pullan (1623422).
- Flight Lieutenant Robert Samuel Riches (159502).
- Flight Lieutenant Norman Frederick Robinson (177846).
- Flight Lieutenant David Windle Hutchinson Smith (154141).
- Flight Lieutenant Frank Albert Thomas, DFC. (134130).
- Flight Lieutenant Graham Arthur John Wood, DFC. (150096).
- Flying Officer Alfred John Camp (1395228).
- Surgeon Lieutenant Commander William Herbert Baxter Ellis, MB BS, Royal Navy.

==== Air Force Cross & bar ====
- Wing Commander Edward William Anderson, OBE DFC AFC (83847).
- Wing Commander Harry Hamilton Scott Brown, AFC MB BS (23355).
- Squadron Leader Frederick Samuel Hazlewood, AFC (55087).
- Squadron Leader Cyril Stanley Hunton, DFC AFC (141735).
- Squadron Leader Thomas Stevenson, AFC (82957).
- Acting Squadron Leader Howard Thomas Murley, DFC AFC (176032).
- Flight Lieutenant Roland Louis Ernest Burton, AFC (50530).

=== Air Force Medal (AFM) ===
- 1382398 Flight Sergeant (now Master Signaller) James John Coucher.
- 1520000 Flight Sergeant Robert James Brydon.
- 1699781 Flight Sergeant Frank Whitfield Burney.
- 1604763 Flight Sergeant Richard Ernest Augustus Buttle.
- 542914 Flight Sergeant Trevor Emrys Evans.
- 1624170 Flight Sergeant William Rider Farrer.
- 656413 Flight Sergeant Robert Lockhart, DFM.
- 1342113 Flight Sergeant John Alan Dyce Meechan, DFC.
- 1587513 Flight Sergeant Douglas Francis James Smith.
- 1459777 Flight Sergeant Ernest Walker.
- 1010518 Flight Sergeant Joseph Eric Williamson.
- 1625553 Flight Sergeant Anthony Wood.
- 4035673 Sergeant William Arthur Barrell.
- 1808587 Sergeant Geoffrey Gordon Davey.
- 1698476 Sergeant Allen Nisbet.
- 788144 Sergeant Jaroslav Schellong.
- 649578 Sergeant Ronald Thomas Denis Smith.

=== Queen's Commendation for Valuable Service in the Air ===
- Captain Thomas Harry Farnsworth, Senior Captain, Operations Development Unit, British Overseas Airways Corporation.
- William Victor Greatorex, DFC, Radio Officer "B", British European Airways Corporation.
- Squadron Leader Percy William George Burgess (45887).
- Squadron Leader Kingsley Lawrence Monaghan, DFC DFM (135401).
- Squadron Leader Robert Sidney Radley, DFC AFC (83263).
- Squadron Leader Fred Rothwell, DFC (45337).
- Squadron Leader Errol Henry Taylor, AFC (59405).
- Squadron Leader Harold Edward White, DFC AFC (119508).
- Acting Squadron Leader Robert Henry Sherwood Butt (59565).
- Acting Squadron Leader William Edward Colahan, DFC (59005).
- Acting Squadron Leader Henry McLeod Delves Deffee (54300) (Retired).
- Acting Squadron Leader Leslie John Hill (41584).
- Flight Lieutenant Erik Peter Bennett (1906354).
- Flight Lieutenant David Henry Blomeley, DFC (40665).
- Flight Lieutenant John Eric Burton (200893).
- Flight Lieutenant Francis Harold Chandler (162231).
- Flight Lieutenant Michael Vynne Christopherson, DFC (60106).
- Flight Lieutenant Peter John Clarke (575039).
- Flight Lieutenant Leslie Jack Cook (164150).
- Flight Lieutenant Charles Thomas Dalziel (185792).
- Flight Lieutenant Francis Edward Debenham (188083).
- Flight Lieutenant James Clifford Douglas, DFC (51319).
- Flight Lieutenant Harold Frederick Edwards, DFC (186640).
- Flight Lieutenant Cecil Owen Ellison, DFC (55066).
- Flight Lieutenant Jack Haldane (55644).
- Flight Lieutenant John William Gill James, DFC (120876).
- Flight Lieutenant Roy Marsden Jenkins, AFC (1652817).
- Flight Lieutenant Arthur Johnson, AFC (56595).
- Flight Lieutenant Richard Cecil Jones (1045115).
- Flight Lieutenant William Clarke Kendall (57546).
- Flight Lieutenant Peter Anthony Latham (57736).
- Flight Lieutenant James Maxwell (125544).
- Flight Lieutenant Kenneth Harry Miles, AFC (163156).
- Flight Lieutenant Walter George Myatt (191909).
- Flight Lieutenant John Rees (54926).
- Flight Lieutenant John Richardson (196473).
- Flight Lieutenant Ralph Bertram Robinson (56766).
- Flight Lieutenant Alfred Charles Shape (175080).
- Flight Lieutenant Ronald Alfred Stenning (1850868).
- Flight Lieutenant John Henry Taylor (174501).
- Flight Lieutenant Douglas Henry Thomas (177863).
- Flight Lieutenant Arthur Cedric Thornton (173794).
- Flight Lieutenant John Raymond Weeds, DFC (119824).
- Flight Lieutenant Joseph Charles Wright, AFC (147899).
- Flight Lieutenant Gordon Wrigley (116449).
- Flying Officer Michael Wellinger Cross (1582107)
- Flying Officer Majer Gelbhauer, DFC. (1270361).
- Flying Officer Robert Ian Young (3012399).
- Master Pilot Norman Edward Burlow (1388761).
- Master Pilot James Nelson Culverwell (905365).
- Master Pilot Alexander David Fell (567416).
- Master Pilot Herbert Ruse (564378).
- Master Navigator Edwin Robert Buttle (544003).
- Master Engineer Henry John Tancock (577585).
- Master Signaller Samuel James Bassam (1127581).
- 1586502 Flight Sergeant Gordon John Christopher Dyer.
- 2206627 Flight Sergeant George Edward Hagan.
- 1122268 Flight Sergeant James Jamieson.
- 1605242 Flight Sergeant Kenneth James Maggs.
- 2206715 Flight Sergeant Thomas Joseph Howden Penny.
- 1585105 Flight Sergeant Walter George Prater.
- 1571812 Flight Sergeant Arthur Ramsden, AFM.
- 1609884 Flight Sergeant Raymond Volanthen.
- 624467 Flight Sergeant Phillip William Wedgwood.
- 1318020 Flight Sergeant John Williams.
- 1311873 Flight Sergeant Ronald Albert William Cobley.
- 2201812 Sergeant Peter Croudson.
- 579219 Sergeant Roy Seymour Davis.
- 579317 Sergeant William Harold George Freeman.
- 1813814 Sergeant Gerald Soall.
- 1591258 Sergeant Charles Bruce Spurr.
- 1576241 Sergeant Robert Tyers.

=== King's Police and Fire Services Medal ===
Police, England and Wales.

- Sir Henry Study, CBE, Chief Constable, West Riding of Yorkshire Constabulary.
- William John Price, Chief Constable, Cardiff City Police Force.
- Paul Foster, Chief Constable, Wigan Borough Police Force.
- Alfred Edward Godden, Chief Constable. Wakefield City Police.
- Hugh Young, CBE, Commander, Metropolitan Police.
- Alfred Reay, Assistant Chief Constable, Durham County Constabulary.
- Cecil Norman Fawcett Lindsay, Chief Superintendent, Lancashire Constabulary.
- Arthur Frederick Stagey, Superintendent, Bristol City Police Force.
- William Edward Deacon, Chief Superintendent, Kent County Constabulary.
- Frederick John Deedman, MM, Superintendent, Metropolitan Police.
- Leslie Albert Watson, Superintendent. Metropolitan Police.

Police, Scotland.

- George McLean, Chief Superintendent, City of Glasgow Police Force.
- Robert Middlemiss, Superintendent, Berwick, Roxburgh & Selkirk Constabulary.

Police, Northern Ireland.

- William John Clarke, Head Constable, Royal Ulster Constabulary.

British Transport Commission.

- Herbert Shenton Cole, Chief of Police, Northern Area, Railway Executive.

Fire Service, England and Wales.

- Albert Walter Alexander Paramor, OBE, Chief Officer, Hampshire Fire Brigade.
- David Kernohan, Chief Officer, Preston Fire Brigade.
- Donald Marshall Taylor, OBE, Chief Officer, Berkshire & Reading Fire Brigade.
- Henry Jones, Chief Officer, Doncaster Fire Brigade.
- Benjamin Jones, Chief Officer, Sheffield Fire Brigade.

Australia

- John Derhm McAuley, Superintendent 2nd Class, New South Wales Police Force.
- Joseph Victor Ramus, Detective Superintendent, 3rd Class, New South Wales Police Force.
- Robert Bruce Mackie, Inspector 1st Class, New South Wales Police Force.
- Francis Dominick Forde, Inspector 1st Class, New South Wales Police Force.
- Cecil Ambrose Robinson, Inspector 1st Class, New South Wales Police Force.
- Michael Brooks, Inspector 1st Class, New South Wales Police Force.

Southern Rhodesia.

- Major Graham Cecil Rogers, British South Africa Police.

Colonies, Protectorates and Protected States.

- Guy Charles Madoc, CPM, Senior Assistant Commissioner of Police, Federation of Malaya.
- Francis Knynett McNamara, CPM, Senior Assistant Commissioner of Police, Federation of Malaya.
- William Victor Aubrey, CPM, Superintendent of Police, Kenya.
- Lewis George Mitchell, CPM, Acting Senior Superintendent of Police, Kenya.
- Hugh Redmayne Walker, CPM, Senior Superintendent of Police, Kenya.
- Neil Patrick Hadow, CPM, Commissioner of Police, Mauritius.
- Eric Harvey Halse, MBE CPM, Commissioner of Police, Somaliland Protectorate.

=== Colonial Police Medal ===
Southern Rhodesia.

- William George Trodd Ashwin, Staff Chief Inspector, British South Africa Police.
- David, Station Sergeant, British South Africa Police.
- Colonel Arthur Selwyn Hickman, MBE, British South Africa Police.
- Mapolisa, Detective Station Sergeant, British South Africa Police.
- Major Basil Joseph Price, British South Africa Police.
- John Oswald Gascoigne Roy, Chief Inspector, British South Africa Police.
- Lieutenant-Colonel William Hampton Dawson Walker, MBE, British South Africa Police.

Colonial Empire.

- Abdullah bin Mohamed, Corporal, Federation of Malaya Police Force.
- Abdullah bin Mohamed Hanafiah, Deputy Superintendent, Federation of Malaya Police Force.
- Stephen Villiers Aitcheson, Assistant District Commandant, Kenya Police Reserve.
- Michael Okai Akyea, Chief Inspector, Gold Coast Police Force.
- Mohamed Ali bin Dasib, Sergeant-Major, Federation of Malaya Police Force.
- Alexander John Allan, Superintendent, Kenya Police Force.
- Appu son of Vellu, Corporal, Special Constabulary, Federation of Malaya.
- Haruna Bangura, Sergeant-Major, Court Messenger Force, Sierra Leone.
- Hector Segar Bastard, District Commandant, Kenya Police Reserve.
- Michael Wales Bearcroft, Senior Reserve Officer, Kenya Police Reserve.
- Ronald Stewart Benton, Assistant Superintendent, Kenya Police Force.
- Frederick Vincent Boswell, Senior Superintendent, Tanganyika Police Force.
- Patrick John Houston Cooper, Acting Senior Superintendent, Gold Coast Police Force.
- Edmund Keith Cowen, Senior Superintendent, Kenya Police Force.
- Terence Martin Pelham Dale, Honorary Inspector, Auxiliary Police, Federation of Malaya.
- Daud bin Ahmad, Corporal, Federation of Malaya Police Force.
- Kenneth Eglen, Acting Assistant Superintendent, Kenya Police Force.
- Frank Allan Fielding, Deputy Superintendent, Federation of Malaya Police Force.
- Owen Oxenden Griffiths, Assistant Superintendent, Singapore Police Force.
- Dhanbahadur Gurung son of Kalu Gurung, Sergeant, Federation of Malaya Police Force.
- Esau Okwach Hagoi, Sergeant, Kenya Police Force.
- Robert Thomas Mitchell Henry, Assistant Superintendent, Federation of Malaya Police Force.
- Richard William Hoyle, Senior Superintendent, Kenya Police Force.
- Ibulaim Isabirye, Constable, Uganda Police Force.
- Ismail bin Salieh, Detective Sergeant-Major, Federation of Malaya Police Force.
- Alexander John, Sergeant, Trinidad Police Force.
- Kasheshya, Detective Sergeant, Northern Rhodesia Police Force.
- Kay Kim Seng, Deputy Superintendent, Federation of Malaya Police Force.
- Mohamed Kero, Assistant Inspector, Kenya Police Force.
- Jeremiah Mawuli Kporvie, Inspector, Gold Coast Police Force.
- Lee Cheong, Sergeant, Special Constabulary, Federation of Malaya.
- George Leys, Assistant Superintendent, Hong Kong Police Force.
- Patrick McCann, Assistant Superintendent, Kenya Police Force.
- Roy Marsh, Senior Reserve Officer, Kenya Police Reserve.
- Wan Mazurki bin Haji Wan Hussein, Constable, Federation of Malaya Police Force.
- Maurice Milner, Acting Superintendent, Kenya Police Force.
- M'Ikiari M'Miriti, Sergeant, Kenya Police Force.
- Mohamed bin Salleh, Sergeant, Special Constabulary, Federation of Malaya.
- Kevin Molloy, Honorary Inspector, Auxiliary Police, Federation of Malaya.
- Amadu Moshie, Sergeant-Major, Gold Coast Police Force.
- Geresomu Musoke son of Zakayo, Head Constable, Uganda Police Force.
- Lieutenant-Colonel Eric Adrian Hayes-Newington, DSO, Staff Officer, Kenya Police Reserve.
- Bernard Phillip Oddie, Inspector, Kenya Police Force.
- Cleophas Okoko Okelo, Inspector, Kenya Police Force.
- John Mark Okise son of B. Okoter, Constable, Uganda Police Force.
- Didakus Ooko, Senior Inspector, Kenya Police Force.
- Ian Scott Paton, Superintendent, Trinidad Police Force.
- David Yates McLellan Picken, Honorary Assistant Superintendent, Auxiliary Police, Federation of Malaya.
- Carel Erasmus Potgieter, Superintendent, Kenya Police Force.
- Luke Raymond Prynn, Superintendent, Singapore Police Force.
- Abdul Rasak bin Abdul Rashid, Corporal, Special Constabulary, Federation of Malaya.
- Boyce Kidson Roberts, District Commandant, Kenya Police Reserve.
- Chanan Ram Saini, Acting Chief Inspector, Kenya Police Force.
- Anthony Francis Salole, Assistant Superintendent, Aden Police Force.
- Maurice John Richard Seddon, Assistant District Commandant, Kenya Police Reserve.
- Shahari bin Mohamed, Sergeant, Special Constabulary, Federation of Malaya.
- Isher Singh, Deputy Superintendent, Federation of Malaya Police Force.
- Hugh Bagehot Swann, District Commandant, Kenya Police Reserve.
- Louis Tam, Sub-Inspector, Hong Kong Police Force.
- Tay Kuan Teck, Inspector, Federation of Malaya Police Force.
- Arthur Eldred Thorpe, Chief Fire Officer, Freetown Fire Force, Sierra Leone.
- John Toft, Assistant Superintendent, Kenya Police Force.
- Tokachil bin Tahir, Corporal, Special Constabulary, Federation of Malaya.
- Ujud bin Bakar, Sub-Inspector, Federation of Malaya Police Force.
- Arthur Wallace, Senior Superintendent, Northern Rhodesia Police Force.
- Sabakaki Wamboye, Sergeant, Kenya Police Force.
- William Campbell Haughey Warner, Acting Assistant Superintendent, Kenya Police Force.
- John Joseph West, Assistant Superintendent, Federation of Malaya Police Force.
- Thomas William Whittingham, Deputy Commissioner, British Guiana Police Force.
- Ya'acob bin Salleh, Sergeant-Major, Federation of Malaya Police Force.
- Yusoff bin Zainaruddin, Sergeant, Special Constabulary, Federation of Malaya.

== Australia ==
=== Knight Bachelor ===
- William John Allison. For services to Australian commerce.
- Daniel McVey, C.M.G. For public services to the Commonwealth of Australia.
- Walter Thomas Merriman. For services to the sheep breeding industry in Australia.
- Lawrence James Wackett, D.F.C, A.F.C. For services to the aircraft industry in Australia.
- Harry Wyatt Wunderly, M.D, F.R.A.C.P, Director of Tuberculosis, Commonwealth Department of Health, Canberra.

=== Order of Saint Michael and Saint George ===
==== Companion of the Order of St Michael and St George (CMG) ====
- The Most Reverend Howard West Kilvinton Mowll, Primate of Australia.
- The Very Reverend Jeremiah Matthias Murphy, S.J., Rector of Newman College, University of Melbourne. For services to education in Australia.
- Ian Clunies Ross, Chairman of the Scientific and Industrial Research Organisation in the Commonwealth of Australia.

=== Order of the Bath ===
==== Companion of the Order of the Bath (CB) ====
Military Division

- Engineer Rear-Admiral John Webster Wishart, C.B.E, Royal Australian Navy.

=== Order of the British Empire ===
==== Dame Grand Cross of the Order of the British Empire (GBE) ====
Civil Division

- Pattie Maie Menzies. For public services to the Commonwealth of Australia.

==== Knight Commander of the Order of the British Empire (KBE) ====
Civil Division

- Air Marshal Richard Williams, C.B, C.B.E, D.S.O, R.A.A.F. (Retired), Director-General of Civil Aviation since 1946.

==== Commander of the Order of the British Empire (CBE) ====
Military Division

- Captain Alan Wedel Ramsay McNicoll, G.M, Royal Australian Navy.
- Brigadier Ronald Godfrey Howy Irving, O.B.E. (2/5), Australian Staff Corps.
- Air Commodore Ian Dougald McLachlan, D.F.C, Royal Australian Air Force.

Civil Division

- Kate Isabel Campbell, M.D, B.S. For services to medical science in Australia.
- John Grenfell Crawford, Secretary, Department of Commerce and Agriculture, Commonwealth of Australia.
- Lady Eleanor Mary Latham. For social welfare services, particularly on behalf of children, in the Commonwealth of Australia.
- Patrick Silvesta McGovern, Commissioner of Taxation.
- William Alexander McLaren, Secretary, Department of the Interior, Commonwealth of Australia.
- Lyle Howard Moore. For public services to the Commonwealth of Australia.
- Frederick William George White, Chief Executive Officer of the Scientific and Industrial Research Organisation in the Commonwealth of Australia.

==== Officer of the Order of the British Empire (OBE) ====
Military Division

- Surgeon Commander Eustace Alwynne Rowlands, V.R.D, M.B, B.S, Royal Australian Naval Reserve.
- Lieutenant-Colonel Charles Newton Barton, E.D. (1/28202), Royal Australian Infantry Corps.
- Colonel (Temporary) Leonard John Bruton (2/18), Australian Staff Corps.
- Lieutenant-Colonel Frederick Ronald Evans (2/41), Australian Staff Corps.
- Group Captain Frank Headlam, Royal Australian Air Force.
- Acting Group Captain James William Reddrop, Royal Australian Air Force.
- Wing Commander Derek Randal Cuming, A.F.C. (033012), Royal Australian Air Force.

Civil Division

- The Right Reverend Richard Bardon, Moderator-General of the Presbyterian Church of Australia.
- Alice Miriam Berry. For public services to the Commonwealth of Australia.
- John Augustus Bostock. For public and philanthropic services in the Commonwealth of Australia.
- John Huntly Collins. For services in the interests of ex-Servicemen in the Commonwealth of Australia.
- Hilda Young Daniell. For services to education in Australia.
- Reginald Murray Dunstone, M.B, Ch.B. For public and social welfare services in the Commonwealth of Australia.
- John Gunther, M.B, B.S, Director of the Department of Public Health of the Territory of Papua and New Guinea.
- Aubrey Halloran, M.B.E. For services rendered to charitable and cultural organisations in the Commonwealth of Australia.
- Eric Harding, M.M, Assistant Secretary, Department of the Army.
- Ralph Bodkin Kelley. For services to cattle breeding in Australia.
- Samuel James Frederick Rellock, Director of Posts and Telegraphs (New South Wales), Postmaster-General's Department, Commonwealth of Australia.
- Alderman Alexander Stuart McDonald. For services to local government organisations in Australia.
- Charles Ernest Naismith. For services to the dairying industry in Australia.
- James Tindal Stewart Scrymgeour. For public services, particularly to the cattle industry in Australia.
- Harold John Stewart. For services to education in Australia.
- Ernest Keith White, M.C, President of the Australian-American Association.

==== Member of the Order of the British Empire (MBE) ====
Military Division

- Lieutenant (E) Harold George Betts, Royal Australian Navy.
- Major Frank Ronald William Charlton (4/17751), Royal Australian Engineers.
- Major Donald Beaumont Dunstan (2/289), Australian Staff Corps.
- Major Cyril Charles Hall (3/320), Australian Staff Corps.
- Captain (Quartermaster) Norman Neels (2/370), Australian Instructional- Corps.
- Major Arthur Cecil Pepper (2/79001), Royal Australian Infantry Corps.
- Major (Quartermaster) Francis Edward Resuggan (2/147), Australian Instructional Corps.
- No.2/579 Warrant Officer Class I William Waddell Sydney Sommerville, Royal Australian Infantry Corps.
- Squadron Leader John Tennent (03459), Citizen Air Force, Commonwealth of Australia.
- Squadron Leader Henry Murdock Bain (03339), Royal Australian Air Force.
- Acting Flight Lieutenant Theo Gough Phillips (0210343), Air Training Corps, Royal Australian Air Force.
- Warrant Officer Ernest Avery (A.3646), Royal Australian Air Force.

Civil Division

- Weller Arnold. For services to the community in Australia.
- Eliza Briggs. For public services, especially in connection with the Australian Red Cross Society.
- Leslie Oswald Brown, Assistant Commissioner, Public Service Board, Commonwealth of Australia.
- Margaret Dorothy Edis. For public services rendered in the Commonwealth of Australia to persons suffering from incurable diseases.
- Ralph Edward Goode, J.P. For public services rendered in the Commonwealth of Australia, especially in the interests of returned servicemen.
- Rebecca Anne Gordon, President of the Australian Imperial League of Sailors', Soldiers' and Airmen's Womenfolk.
- John Hill, a former Head of the Engineering Branch in the State of Victoria of the Postmaster-General's Department, Commonwealth of Australia.
- William Charles John Hill, J.P. For services to the Boy Scout movement and ex-servicemen's organisations in the Commonwealth of Australia.
- Mary Linus Lawson. For services to public and charitable organisations in the Commonwealth of Australia.
- Amy Elizabeth Lefroy. For services to the Australian Red Cross Society.
- Charlotte Joan Mcallister. In recognition of her services to the nursing profession in Australia.
- Annie Bertha Parry. For services to first aid, especially in connection with the St. John Ambulance Association in Australia.
- Sarah Peterson, J.P. For social welfare services in the Commonwealth of Australia.
- Bervin Ellis Purnell. For services to local government in Australia.
- Philip Rees, a former President of the Superannuation Board, Commonwealth of Australia.
- John Cameron Semmens, Deputy Assistant Commissioner, Salvation Army Philanthropic Organisation attached to the 3rd Battalion, The Royal Australian Regiment in Korea.
- Henry Harrison Edward Swan, International Relations Officer, Department of Civil Aviation.
- Claude Taylor, Chief Finance Officer, Department of the Army.
- Gladys Ellen Wallace, J.P. For public services, especially in the interests of servicemen and their dependants in Australia.
- John Philip Walshe, External Communications Officer, Department of External Affairs, Commonwealth of Australia.
- Ruth White. For services rendered to patriotic, charitable and public health organisations in Australia.

=== British Empire Medal (BEM) ===
Military Division

- Chief Petty Officer Allan Sly, 12171, Royal Australian Navy.
- No.4/9044 Warrant Officer Class II (Temporary) John Wheeler Arnold, Royal Australian Infantry Corps.
- No.3/92361 Warrant Officer Class II (Temporary) Harold Jackson Bailey Burrell, M.M, Royal Australian Infantry Corps.
- No.6/142 Warrant Officer Class II (Temporary) Bernard Patrick McCarthy, Royal Australian Army Service Corps.
- No.2/879 Warrant Officer Class II (Temporary) Richard Osborne McLaughlin, D.C.M, Royal Australian Infantry Corps.
- No.4/108 Staff Sergeant William Nug Plunkett, Royal Australian Army Service Corps.
- No.3/45355 Staff Sergeant Robert John Roberts, Royal Australian Armoured Corps.
- No.1/9367 Warrant Officer Class I (Temporary) Charles Roland Selvage, Royal Australian Engineers.
- A.1973 Flight Sergeant George Henry Stirzaker, Royal Australian Air Force.
- A.588 Sergeant Herbert Vercoe Carne, Royal Australian Air Force.
- A.1143 Sergeant James Brown McCallum, Royal Australian Air Force.
- A.35533 Sergeant Henry Thomas Moore, Royal Australian Air Force.

=== Associate of the Royal Red Cross (ARRC) ===
- Matron Agnes Teresa Cleary (N.11482), Royal Australian Air Force Nursing Service.

=== Air Force Cross (AFC) ===
- Squadron Leader Peter Frank Raw, D.F.C. (033113), Royal Australian Air Force.
- Flight Lieutenant Alexander John Bunyan (022028), Royal Australian Air Force.
- Flight Lieutenant Frank Robert Davies (023615), Royal Australian Air Force.
- Flight Lieutenant William Henry Scott (033175), Royal Australian Air Force.
- Warrant Officer Roy Rosevear (A.22008), Royal Australian Air Force.

=== Queen's Commendation for Valuable Service in the Air ===
- Flight Lieutenant Thomas Clifford McGrath (011370), Royal Australian Air Force.
- Flying Officer Leonard Richard Watkin (011433), Royal Australian Air Force.
- Warrant Officer Frederick John Wood (A.2483), Royal Australian Air Force.

== Ceylon ==
=== Knight Bachelor ===
- Deepal Susanta De Fonseka, Envoy Extraordinary and Minister Plenipotentiary of Ceylon in Japan.
- Arthur Godwin Ranasinha, CMG, CBE, Permanent Secretary to the Ministry of Finance, Secretary to the Treasury, and Secretary to the Cabinet.

=== Order of Saint Michael and Saint George ===
==== Companion of the Order of St Michael and St George (CMG) ====
- Walter Gerald Wickremesinghe, OBE, MRCS, LRCP, lately Acting Director of Health Services.
- Tom Neville Wynne-Jones, CBE, Chief Architect, Public Works Department.

=== Order of the British Empire ===
==== Commander of the Order of the British Empire (CBE) ====
Civil Division

- Nandasara Wijetilaka Atukorala, OBE, Secretary to the Prime Minister.
- Ralph St. Louis Pieris Deraniyagala, OBE, Clerk to the House of Representatives.
- Edmund Vernon Raymond Samerawickrame, Clerk to the Senate.

==== Officer of the Order of the British Empire (OBE) ====
Military Division

- Lieutenant-Colonel Cyril Van Langenberg, ED, Ceylon Light Infantry.

Civil Division

- Winslow Thambiah Ivers Alagaratnam, MInstCE, Director of Irrigation.
- Louis Gerard Blazé, LMS, LRCP, lately Acting Deputy Director of Health (Medical Services).
- Walter Dandris Gunaratna, Government Agent, Eastern Province.
- Anian Walter Richard Joachim, MBE, Director of Agriculture.
- Geoffrey Burton King, Surveyor-General.
- Bernard Percival Peiris, MBE, Assistant Secretary to the Cabinet.
- Aubrey Neil Weinman, MBE, Superintendent, Ceylon Zoological Gardens.

==== Member of the Order of the British Empire (MBE) ====
Military Division

- Captain Anthony St. Clair Rex De Costa, MB, BS, Ceylon Volunteer Force.

Civil Division

- Edmund Clement Fernando, Chief Engineer and Manager, Department of Government Electrical Undertakings.
- Alfred Proom Humble, Resident Engineer, Port Development Works.
- Hettiaractichige Jinadasa, Rubber Commissioner.
- Charles Trevor Lorage, Chief Inspector of Schools, Department of Education.
- Wijesinghe Aratchige Bertram Arthur Eric Perera, Divisional Transportation Superintendent, Ceylon Government Railway.
- Gabriel Asvini Kumara Rockwood, Deputy Inspector-General of Police.
- Herbert Ernest Tennekoon, Land Commissioner.
- Raphael Lawrence Tiruchelvam, MRCS, LRCP, Acting Director of Social Services.
- Rienzie Alexander Wijeyekoon, Assistant Secretary, Ministry of Transport and Works.
- Everard Clarence Wijeyesekera, Chief Engineer, Way and Works, Ceylon Government Railway.
- Somisara Banda Yatawara, Deputy Commissioner of Co-operative Development.

== Pakistan ==
=== Knight Bachelor ===
- George Baxandall Constantine (Honourable Mr. Justice Constantine), Chief Judge, Sind Chief Court.

=== Order of the Bath ===
==== Companion of the Order of the Bath (CB) ====
Military Division

- Brigadier (temporary) Charles Ian Jerrard, CBE, British Service (Special List).

=== Order of Saint Michael and Saint George ===
==== Companion of the Order of St Michael and St George (CMG) ====
- Herbert William Waite, CIE, Principal, Police Training School, Punjab.

=== Order of the British Empire ===
==== Knight Commander of the Order of the British Empire (KBE) ====
Civil Division

- Edward Alec Abbott Snelson, OBE., Secretary, Ministry of Law and Ministry of Parliamentary Affairs.

==== Commander of the Order of the British Empire (CBE) ====
Military Division

- Colonel (temporary) John Richard Connor, OBE, Corps of Royal Engineers.
- Colonel (temporary) Harold Garnett Eccles, British Service (Special List).

Civil Division

- John Ortcheson, Legal Remembrancer, Government of the Punjab.

==== Officer of the Order of the British Empire (OBE) ====
Military Division

- Acting Commander John Abbott, Royal Pakistan Navy.
- Lieutenant-Colonel (temporary) Archibald Joseph Apperley, Corps of Royal Electrical and Mechanical Engineers.
- Lieutenant-Colonel (temporary) Edwin Harold Bowen, Corps of Royal Pakistan Engineers.
- Major Franklin Burbridge Ledlie, MBE, Royal Pakistan Army Service Corps.

Civil Division

- Richard Frederick Thomas Farrant, Deputy Secretary, Public Works Department, Punjab.
- Lieutenant-Colonel John Angus Hume, Deputy Commissioner, Chittagong Hill Tracts.
- Lieutenant-Colonel David Kenneth Oldrini, MC, Administrative Officer, Frontier Corps.
- Emanuel Sam Philpott, MBE, Director of Administration and Co-ordination.
- George Arthur MacMillan Smith, Deputy Financial Adviser, Military Finance, Rawalpindi.

==== Member of the Order of the British Empire (MBE) ====
Military Division

- Major (temporary) Lawrence Joseph McAdam, Royal Army Ordnance Corps.
- Major (temporary) Charles James Dick Maiden, British Service (Special List).
- Captain (temporary) William Malpas White, British Service (Special List).

Civil Division

- Mervyn Douglas Hicks, Controller of Telegraph Stores, Karachi.
- Hubert Pascal Murray, Assistant Chief Engineer (Administration), Directorate of Posts and Telegraph.
- Charles Harold Shirtcliffe, Deputy Assistant Director of Ordnance Factories.
- Mervyn John Alston Wood, Establishment Officer, Food Department, Punjab.
- Annetta Wrench. For social services in Karachi.

=== British Empire Medal (BEM) ===
Military Division

- 562580 Flight Sergeant (Acting Warrant Officer) Reginald Ernest Meakin, Royal Pakistan Air Force.

Civil Division

- Frank Richard John Sawyer, lately Chargeman of Coppersmiths, Royal Pakistan Naval Torpedo Depot.
