= Hooton (surname) =

Hooton is a surname. Notable people with the surname include:

- Amanda Hooton, Australian journalist
- Burt Hooton (born 1950), American baseball player
- Charles Hooton (1810–1847), English novelist and journalist
- Christopher Hooton, British journalist, podcaster and filmmaker
- Earnest Hooton (1887–1954), American anthropologist
- Edie Hooton, American politician
- Elizabeth Hooton (1600–1672), Quaker preacher
- Ellen Hooton, English juvenile cotton mill worker who, in 1833, gave testimony in court regarding her experiences as a child laborer
- Esmé Hooton (1914–1992), English poet
- Florence Hooton (1912–1988), English cellist
- Harriet Hooton (1875–1960), Australian editor and activist
- Harry Hooton (1908–1961), Australian poet
- James Hooton (born 1973), English actor
- Joseph Hooton Taylor Jr. (born 1941), American astrophysicist
- Mott Hooton (1838–1920), American soldier
- Peter Hooton (born 1962), English vocalist
- Rex Hooton (born 1947), New Zealand cricketer
- Thomas Hooton Michael Dix (1908–1985), British Anglican priest, Archdeacon of Zanzibar

== See also ==
- Hooton (disambiguation)
- Hooten
