= List of museums in Bedfordshire =

This list of museums in Bedfordshire, England contains museums which are defined for this context as institutions (including nonprofit organizations, government entities, and private businesses) that collect and care for objects of cultural, artistic, scientific, or historical interest and make their collections or related exhibits available for public viewing. Also included are non-profit art galleries and university art galleries. Museums that exist only in cyberspace (i.e., virtual museums) are not included.

Name	Image	Town/City	Type	Summary
Elstow Moot Hall		Elstow	Historic house	17th century period furnished meeting hall
Glenn Miller Museum		Bedford	Military	Located at the former World War II airfield from which musician Glenn Miller departed before his plane disappeared, includes military aviation and other military and wartime displays
The Higgins Art Gallery & Museum		Bedford	Multiple	Local history, art, culture, natural history, geology, archaeology, coins
John Bunyan Museum		Bedford	Biographical	Life, times and works of John Bunyan, author of The Pilgrim's Progress
John Dony Field Centre		Luton	Local	local history and natural history
Leighton Buzzard Railway		Leighton Buzzard	Heritage Railway	Train rides, industrial narrow gauge railway museum, sand quarrying http://www.buzzrail.co.uk/
Military Intelligence Museum	Image of the front entrance to the Military Intelligence Museum building. Low grey building with large white signs either side of entrance door.	Shefford	Military	'Sharing the Secrets' of the shadowy world of intelligence, security, espionage and other military intelligence disciplines.
Moggerhanger House		Moggerhanger	Historic house	Early 19th century home designed by John Soane, gardens
Panacea Museum		Bedford	Biographical	Life, times and writings of Mable Barltop, Founder of The Panacea Society
RAF Signals Museum		Henlow	Military	Radio and electronics communications history of the RAF
Roman Sandy Story		Sandy	Archaeology	information, information, display of Roman artifacts and artist renderings of the town's past, located in the Council offices
Shuttleworth Collection		Old Warden	Transport	Airplanes, automobiles, motorcycles
Stockwood Discovery Centre		Luton	Multiple	Includes the Mossman Collection of carriages, geology, archaeology, social history and rural crafts
Stondon Motor Museum		Lower Stondon	Transport	automobiles, trucks, buses, motorcycles, airplanes, replica of the HM Bark Endeavour of explorer James Cook, tanks
Tempsford Village Museum		Tempsford	Local & Military	ephemera associated with the village of Tempsford and RAF Tempsford
Thurleigh Museum		Thurleigh	Military	History of RAE Bedford in World War II, also known as the 306th Bombardment Group Museum
Turvey Abbey		Turvey	Historic house	Neo-classical house featuring 18th and 19th century English and Continental furniture, pictures, porcelain, objets d'art and books
Wardown Park Museum		Luton	Multiple	Local crafts including lace and hat-making, local history, culture, Bedfordshire and Hertfordshire Regiment, archaeology, art, natural history; formerly the Luton Museum & Art Gallery
Woburn Abbey		Woburn	Historic house	Estate of the Duke of Bedford, includes 18th Century French and English furniture, silver and gold collections, porcelain, fine art, gardens, deer park
Woburn Heritage Centre		Woburn	Local	local history

== See also ==
- Category:Tourist attractions in Bedfordshire
