= Carlton, Bedfordshire =

Village in Bedfordshire, England

Coordinates: 52.1933°N 0.6022°W

Carlton
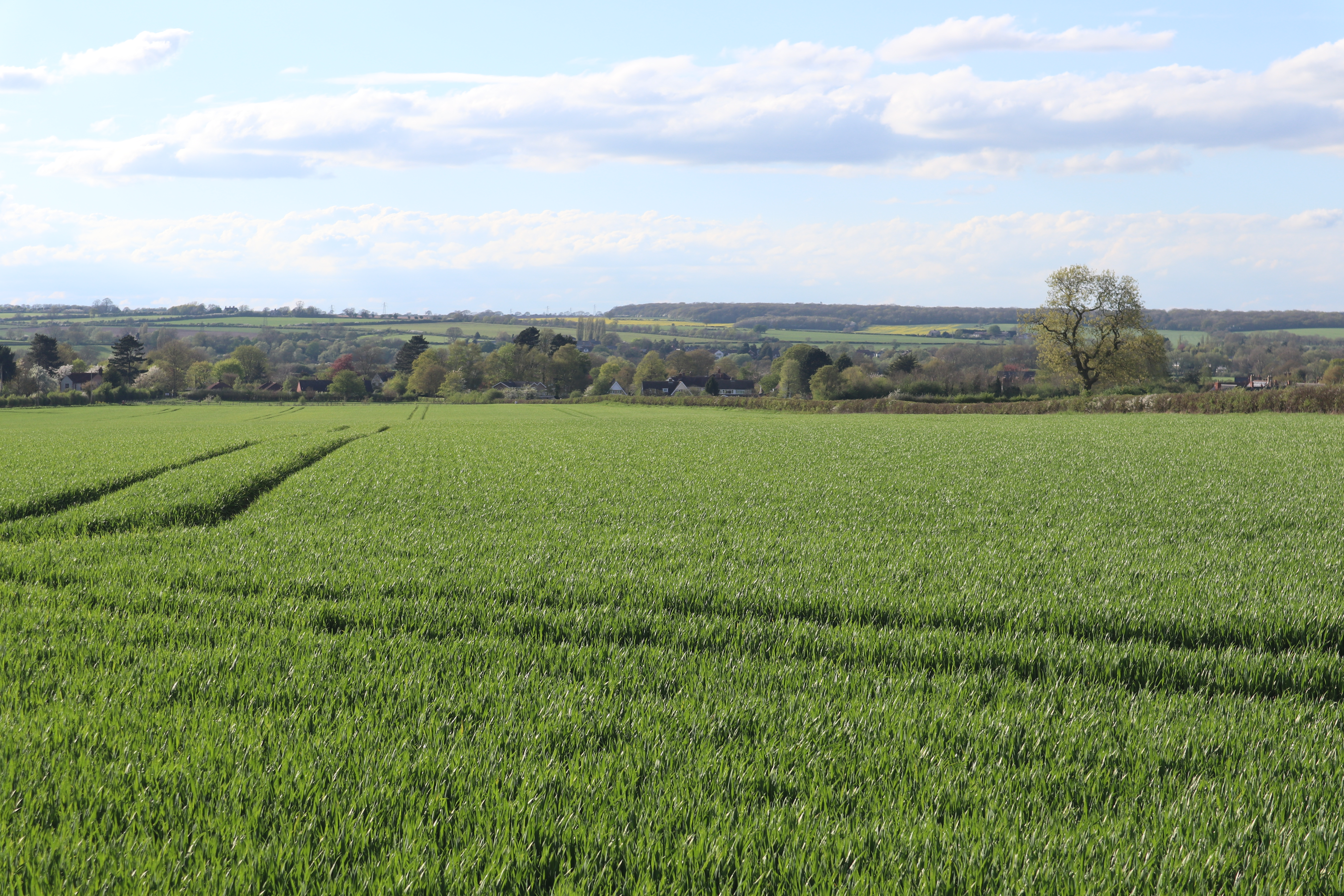
- Carlton, Bedfordshire

- Location within Bedfordshire
- OS grid reference: SP955335
- Civil parish: Carlton and Chellington
- Unitary authority: Bedford
- Ceremonial county: Bedfordshire
- Region: East
- Country: England
- Sovereign state: United Kingdom
- Post town: BEDFORD
- Postcode district: MK43
- Dialling code: 01234
- Police: Bedfordshire
- Fire: Bedfordshire
- Ambulance: East of England
- UK Parliament: North Bedfordshire

Carlton is a village in the civil parish of Carlton and Chellington, in the Bedford borough of Bedfordshire, England. The River Great Ouse runs just to the north of the village. Nearby places are Chellington, Harrold, Pavenham, Turvey, Lavendon and Odell.

Carlton was recorded in the Domesday Book of 1086 as a parish within the Hundred of Willey. The name Carlton has its origins in the English language and is derived from the combination of two elements: carl meaning free man or peasant, and ton meaning town or settlement. Together, Carlton translates to as the town of the free men. This name sheds light on the historical significance of social classes and demographics in medieval England, where names often represented one's occupation or social status.

Carlton's church is Saint Mary the Virgin, dating from 950AD with a font from c. 1150 sited outside the current village.

In 1934 the parish was merged with the neighbouring parish of Chellington to form a new civil parish called Carlton and Chellington. At the 1931 census (the last before the abolition of the parish), Carlton had a population of 340.

The village has historically been laid out in a rectangular road pattern, the main parts of the village being around the roads of Bridgend and the High Street, with The Moor and The Causeway making up the rectangle's other sides. During the twentieth century the areas in between were filled out with housing along the roads of Rectory Close, Carriers Way, Street Close, and Beeby Way.

Carlton Park is located in Rectory Close and features three swings, a small basketball court, a football pitch and a 1.5 meter slide. It also features one of the main landmarks of Carlton, its giant oak tree.

Carlton has two pubs, The Royal Oak and The Fox. A third pub, The Angel, traded on the High Street until the 1990s. It has since been converted into a private residence. There is a Post Office and village shop located on Carlton's busiest through road, Bridgend. There is also one school, Carlton C of E Primary School and a village hall which is also used as the school's assembly and sports hall. The village has an Emmaus community which includes a cafe / restaurant, furniture repair workshop and secondhand shop. Also situated on the Emmaus site is Carlton Squash Club, that has two courts for both squash and racketball. The courts were opened in 1980 by the football manager Brian Clough, himself a keen squash player.

The village was struck by an F1/T2 tornado on 23 November 1981, as part of the record-breaking nationwide tornado outbreak on that day.
