= Harrold-Odell Country Park =

English nature preserve

Coordinates: 52°12′21″N 0°35′49″W

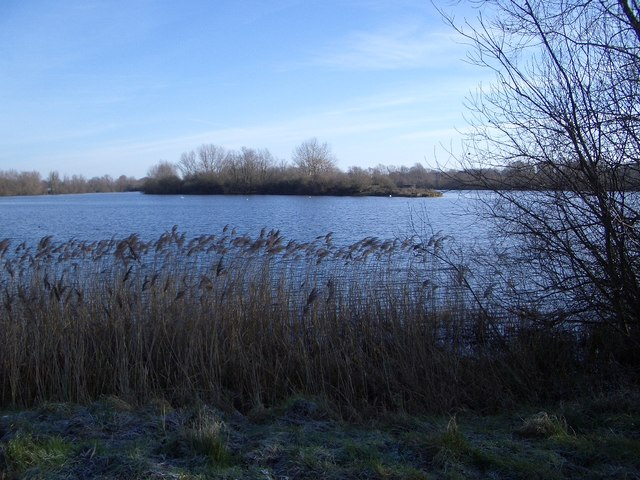

The Harrold-Odell Country Park is a 59.3 hectare Country park and Local Nature Reserve between the villages of Odell and Harrold in Bedfordshire. It is owned and managed by Bedford Borough Council, and it has a cafe, toilets and an information room.

The area has been settled since at least the 3rd century, and there was a Roman farmstead at what is now the Grebe Lake. A nearby landmark is the former Saint Nicholas church at Chellington, which was deconsecrated in 1975 and can be seen from across the lake.

The site was formerly a sand and gravel quarry, and was converted to a park in the 1980s. It is bordered on its southern and eastern side by the River Great Ouse. It has two lakes, water meadows and woodland, some of which is seasonally flooded. There is a wide variety of birds, and mammals include otters, shrews and bats.

There is access from Carlton Road.
