= Lipton Institute of Tea =

Tea research facility

Lipton Institute of Tea Logo

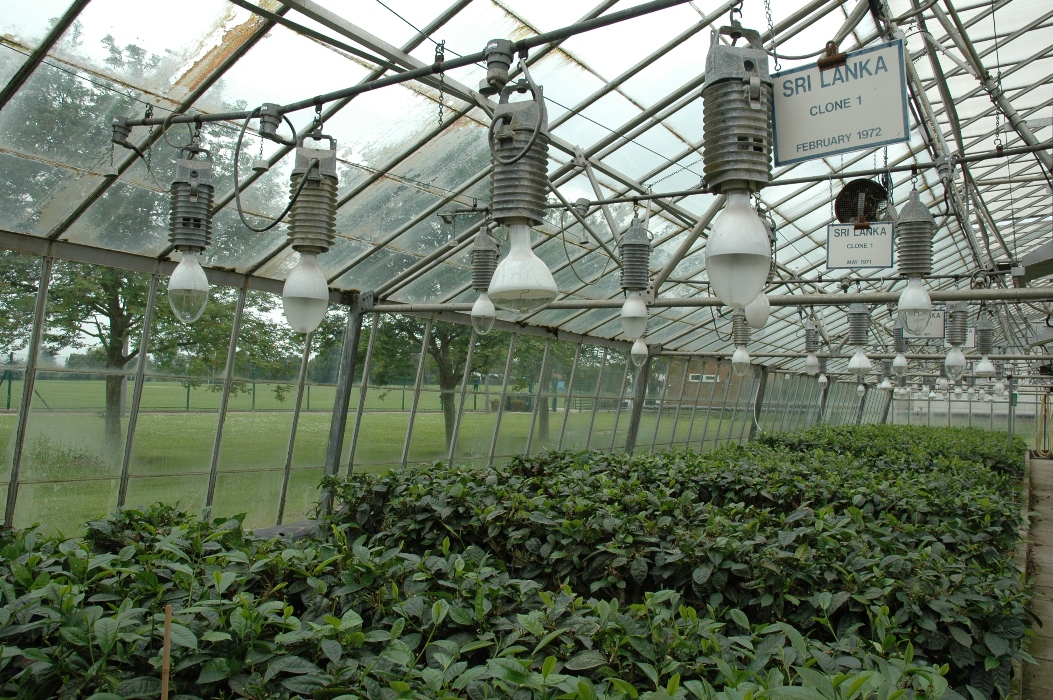
The Tea Greenhouse at the Lipton Institute of Tea, the world's most northerly tea plantation

The Lipton Institute of Tea was a dedicated tea research facility established by consumer goods company Unilever, which closed in 2013. The Institute conducts studies on the mental and physical health benefits of tea. As well as research conducted directly by the Institute, it also funded and coordinated research projects at academic and research institutions around the world.

== Background ==
The Lipton Institute of Tea was headquartered in Sharnbrook in Bedfordshire, UK. A formal tea research base had been established there by Unilever in 1967. The Institute also has research centres and regional representatives located in major tea-growing regions (such as India and Kericho, Kenya) and other key tea-drinking markets (including France, Japan, China, and the US). The Institute claimed as its mission "to promote awareness and understanding of tea, from bush to cup". The Institute also participated in and organised scientific conferences.

Integral to the Institute’s research facilities was its operation of what it claimed was the world’s most northerly tea plantation at its UK headquarters. This facility grew representative samples of tea from around the world in a controlled environment.

== Research ==
The Institute invested in clinical trials to support health benefit claims and its scientific understanding of Camellia sinensis (tea). Many of the Institute’s findings have resulted in academic publications.

Work focused on theanine and flavonoid antioxidants, both of which occur naturally in tea and are claimed to have health benefits. The Institute also funded research on heart health and stroke and, in April 2009, published the results of research conducted with the University of L'Aquila, Italy, about tea and cardiovascular health.

== See also ==
- L-Theanine
- Tanganda Tea
