= Thomas Hooton Michael Dix =

Anglican archdeacon

The Venerable Thomas Hooton Michael Dix ARCO

Personal details
- Born: 7 April 1908 Harrold, Bedfordshire, England
- Died: 1985 (aged 76–77) Hove, West Sussex, England
- Education: Bedford Modern School; King's College London

The Venerable Thomas Hooton Michael Dix ARCO (7 April 1908 – 1985) was Archdeacon of Zanzibar and Priest in Charge of Christ Church Cathedral, Zanzibar between 1954 and 1959. In 1970 he was made Hon. Canon of St Albans Cathedral and, in 1974, Canon (Emeritus) of St Albans Cathedral.

== Life ==
Thomas Hooton Michael Dix was born on 7 April 1908, the elder son of Mr and Mrs A. Dix of Oakhaven, Harrold, Bedfordshire. He was educated at Bedford Modern School between 1920 and 1926, and was a regular prizewinner in the organ classes at the Bedfordshire Music Festival.

After school he attended King’s College, London, and on graduation he became a school teacher in Hendon while also attaining the Associateship Diploma (ARCO) at the Royal College of Organists in 1934. He later returned to King’s College, London to study theology and, in 1940, attended the Bishops' College, Cheshunt.

Following his theological studies, Dix became a curate at St Saviour’s, St Albans and was ordained as a deacon in 1940 and as a priest in 1941. In 1943 he joined the Universities' Mission to Central Africa and was sent to the Zanzibar Diocese where he served as Priest in Charge of Msalabani (1944–51) and as a missionary in Tanga (1951–54). In 1954, Dix was made Archdeacon of Zanzibar and Priest in Charge of Christ Church Cathedral, Zanzibar. He conducted a service during an official visit to Zanzibar by Princess Margaret on 7 October 1956.

After his tenure in Zanzibar, Dix was made Vicar of Harrold, Bedfordshire (1959–63), concurrently acting as Curate in Charge of Carlton with Chellington and as Rural Dean of Felmersham (1962–63). In 1963 he was made Vicar of Flamstead in Hertfordshire, a position he held until 1974.

In 1970, Dix was made Hon. Canon of St Albans Cathedral and Canon (Emeritus) of St Albans Cathedral in 1974. He died in Hove, West Sussex, in 1985.
