= Thurleigh Castle =

Medieval castle in England

- Thurleigh, Bedfordshire, England

Site information
- Type: Motte-and-bailey
- Condition: Earthworks

Location
- Shown within Bedfordshire
- Coordinates: 52.2138°N 0.4617°W
- Grid reference: grid reference TL052584

Thurleigh Castle, also known as Bury Hills, was a medieval castle in the civil parish of Thurleigh, in the county of Bedfordshire, England.

== Details ==
The site is a Scheduled Monument, protected by law and described as Bury Hill Camp: a motte-and-bailey castle with three fishponds. The motte is notable in that it has a top platform on two levels, and the bailey is also of unusual form and is exceptionally large.

The motte is an earthen mound, oval in plan, measuring 60m long by up to 40m wide at its base and between 40m long by 20m wide at the top. The higher level is at the north-eastern end and is thought to have held the stronghold. To the south of the motte is the bailey which is irregular in shape and measures 200m by 270m.

Excavations in the 1970s found few remains of the Norman castle, but finds indicated that the site had been occupied in the Iron-Age, Roman and Saxon periods. It has been postulated that the motte and bailey was the easternmost of a line of defensive sites on the upper reaches of the Ouse which extends to Odell. The building of the castle has been ascribed to King Stephen (1135–54). Much of the site has been developed and the scheduled protection applies mainly to the ground underneath. Only earthworks survive today.

== See also ==
- Castles in Great Britain and Ireland
- List of castles in England
