= Lavendon =

Village in Buckinghamshire, England

Coordinates: 52.172°N 0.663°W

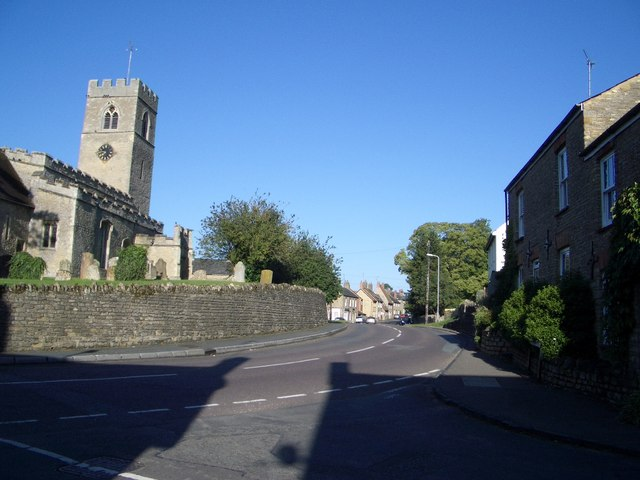
- Church Corner and Northampton Road (A428)

- Location within Buckinghamshire
- Interactive map of Lavendon
- Population: 1,434 (2021 census)
- OS grid reference: SP915535
- Civil parish: Lavendon
- District: City of Milton Keynes
- Unitary authority: Milton Keynes City Council
- Ceremonial county: Buckinghamshire
- Region: South East
- Country: England
- Sovereign state: United Kingdom
- Post town: OLNEY
- Postcode district: MK46
- Dialling code: 01234
- Police: Thames Valley
- Fire: Buckinghamshire
- Ambulance: South Central
- UK Parliament: Milton Keynes North

Lavendon is a village and civil parish in the City of Milton Keynes, Buckinghamshire, England. It is the northernmost village in the Milton Keynes UA and South East England, (Note: Nearby Warrington is more northerly but is formally a hamlet.) near Olney, about 8 miles (13 km) WNW of Bedford and 9 miles (14 km) NNE of Central Milton Keynes.

Nearby places are Warrington, and Cold Brayfield in the Milton Keynes UA, and Harrold and Carlton over the border in Bedfordshire.

== History ==
The village name is derived from a personal name and a place-name element from the Old English language (Lafan + denu), and means 'Lafa's valley'. In the Domesday Book of 1086 the village was recorded as Lavendene and Lawendene.

The village was once the location of a Lavendon Abbey, a Premonstratensian abbey, founded between 1155 and 1158 by John de Bidun. The abbey was suppressed in the Dissolution of the Monasteries in 1536. It stood at what is now Abbey Farm (formerly Lavendon Grange): this site is a scheduled monument. At Castle Farm are the earthworks of a motte-and-bailey castle created in the twelfth century by de Bidun family as the headquarters of their barony of Lavendon. The castle was last recorded in 1232. It too is a scheduled monument. A third scheduled monument nearby, 'The Bury' (a ringwork), may be a precursor to the castle. The site of Uphoe Manor is yet another scheduled monument.

The Earl of Gainsborough was patron of the parish church.

The village is on the route of the 1936 Jarrow March, there is a small plaque on the churchyard wall to commemorate this.

== Modern Lavendon ==
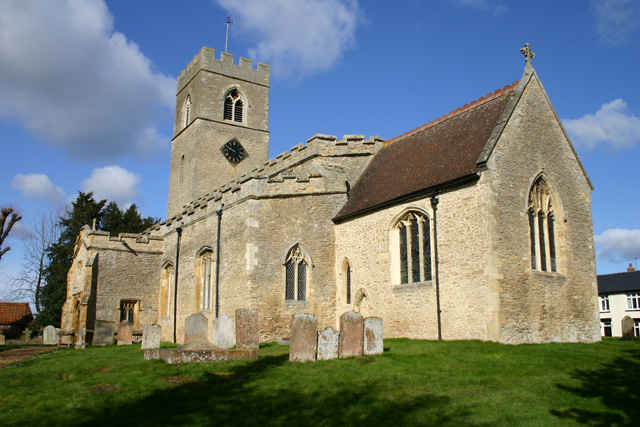
St Michael's Church

The parish church is dedicated to St Michael: it dates from the 12th century and is a Grade I listed building. There is also a Baptist Church that meets at the Union Chapel in the centre of the village.

The village has a combined school for children from reception (4 years) through to year 6 (11 years). It also has a village store and Post Office, an independent garage, village hall and two public houses, the Green Man and The Horseshoe. There is also a pre-school and a nursery.

The company Tusting has a small factory on Olney Road producing a wide range of luxury leather goods which are exported worldwide.

The Lavendon Narrow Gauge Railway is situated in the village and it open to the public a few Sundays a year.
