= Tusting =

British leathergoods maker

- Industry: Fashion
- Founded: 1875
- Founder: Charles Pettit
- Headquarters: Lavendon, United Kingdom
- Products: Luxury leather bags
- Website: www.tusting.co.uk

Tusting is a British leathergoods maker known for its luxury handbags and luggage. The firm was founded in 1875 and operates from a factory in the village of Lavendon, Buckinghamshire.

== History ==
Tusting began as a tannery and leather importer, founded in 1875 by Charles Pettit in Harrold, Bedfordshire, a village known for its leather industry. The company would later move to Lavendon, a neighbouring village, where it remains today.

The company continues to be operated by the Tusting family. Co-owners William and Alistair Tusting are the company's fifth generation, the great-great-grandchildren of Pettit.

== Products and Sales ==
The Tusting factory employs 38 workers, mostly from surrounding villages. They use traditional leatherworking methods to create the company's products. These include travel luggage, briefcases, satchels, handbags, computer and phone cases and other accessories. All Tusting bags are entirely designed and manufactured in the Lavendon factory. According to fashion blog Merchant and Makers, Tusting bags exhibit "classic styles that are timeless".

About 40% of Tusting sales are made to Japanese customers, as of 2014. The brand is also popular in China, where it has a store located in Tianjin. Tusting launched a pop-up store in London's Jermyn Street in December 2014, and is actively considering further stores in China, London and elsewhere. Tusting is or has been stocked by stores including Fortnum and Mason, Budd and Pickett in London and Hankyu, Osaka. It has also collaborated with other British brands including Aston Martin and Church's.

== The Princess of Wales ==
Tusting garnered media attention when Catherine Middleton, later Princess of Wales, was photographed with a Tusting Explorer holdall in 2007. According to the Evening Standard, Doctor Who actor Matt Smith is also a fan of Tusting.
