= Carlton with Chellington =

- Civil parish
- Interactive map of Carlton with Chellington
- Coordinates: 52.188°N 0.603°W
- Country: England
- Primary council: Bedford
- County: Bedfordshire
- Region: East of England
- Status: Parish
- Main settlements: Carlton, Chellington

Government
  - Type: Parish Council
  - UK Parliament: North Bedfordshire

Population (2011)
  - Total: 974
- Postal code: MK43
- Area code: MK
- Website: Carlton with Chellington Parish Council

Carlton with Chellington is a civil parish in the historical Hundred of Willey in Bedfordshire, England, and is within the Borough of Bedford. The parish is situated on the South bank of the River Great Ouse, from Harrold, and includes the villages of Carlton and Chellington.

The two parishes of Carlton and Chellington were combined in 1934 and until 1974 the parish formed part of Bedford Rural District.

Other nearby places are Pavenham, Turvey, Felmersham, and Stevington.
