= Lavendon Castle =

Castle in Lavendon, Buckinghamshire, England

Coordinates: 52°10′47.7″N 0°39′31.8″W

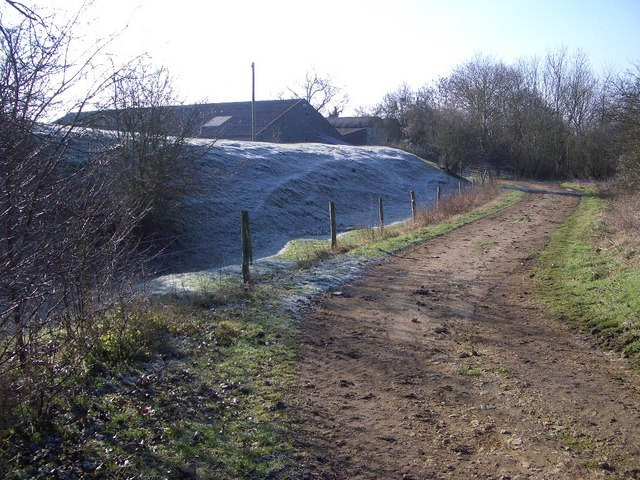
The frost covered earthworks on the left are the NW boundary of an inner bailey associated with the Lavendon motte & bailey castle

Lavendon Castle stood to the north of the village of Lavendon, Buckinghamshire, England.

A motte or ringwork and bailey were mentioned in a pipe roll of 1192–3. It was probably built by a member of the Bidun family, and later belonged to the Pevers. The motte was destroyed in 1944 when much 12th-century pottery was found. The castle is believed to have been destroyed around the 1530s. A farmhouse and garden terracing built in the 17th century have effectively destroyed the former mound and today only earthworks remain.
