= RAF Thurleigh =

Second World War RAF station

RAF Thurleigh USAAF Station 111
- Near Thurleigh, Bedford, Bedfordshire in England
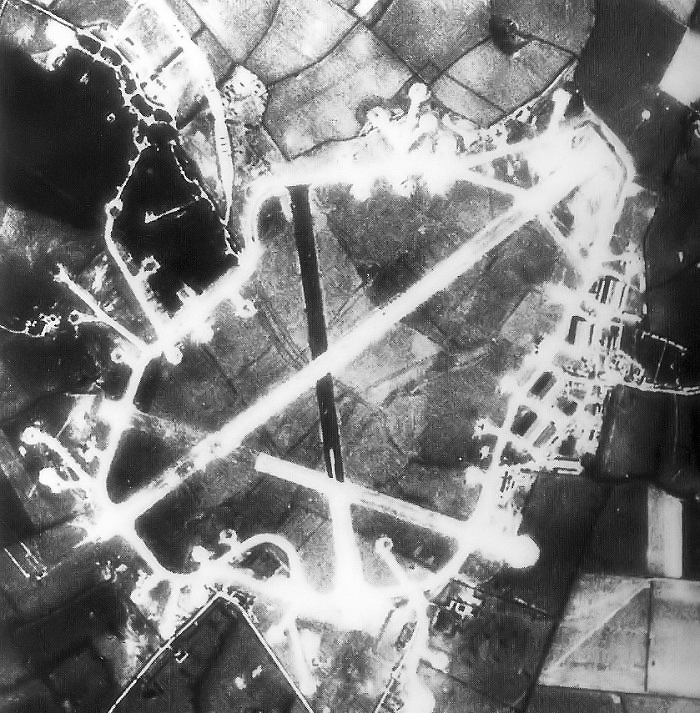
- RAF Thurleigh 12 March 1943

Site information
- Type: Royal Air Force station
- Owner: Air Ministry
- Operator: Royal Air Force; United States Army Air Forces
- Controlled by: RAF Bomber Command; Eighth Air Force

Location
- Location within Bedfordshire RAF Thurleigh (the United Kingdom)
- Coordinates: 52°13′47″N 000°28′29″W

Site history
- Built: 1940
- Built by: W & C French Ltd.
- In use: 1941-1946
- Battles/wars: Second World War

Garrison information
- Past commanders: Squadron Leader D. A. Batwell RAF; 1942-September 1942; Colonel C. B. Overacker USAAF; September 1942-1945
- Garrison: 306th Bombardment Group (Heavy)

Airfield information
Runways
Direction	Length and surface
06/24	1,828 metres (5,997 ft) Concrete
12/30	1,280 metres (4,199 ft) Concrete
18/36	1,280 metres (4,199 ft) Concrete

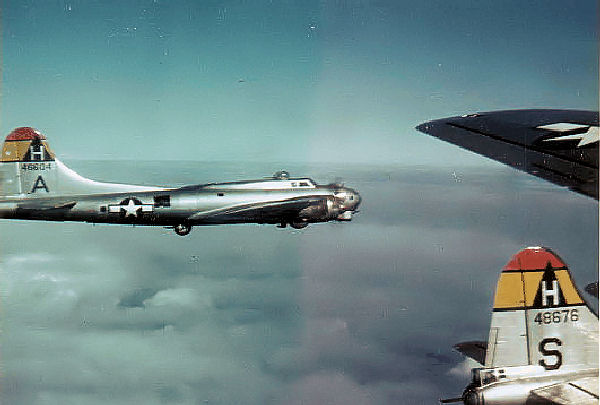
B-17G Flying Fortresses of the 306th Bomb Group displaying the 'Triangle H' tail code

Royal Air Force Thurleigh or more simply RAF Thurleigh is a former Royal Air Force station located 5 miles (8 km) north of Bedford, Bedfordshire, England. Thurleigh was transferred to the United States Army Air Forces Eighth Air Force on 9 December 1942 and designated Station 111, and used for heavy bomber operations against Nazi Germany.

== History ==
Thurleigh (pronounced "thur-lie") was built for RAF Bomber Command in 1940 by W & C French Ltd. 1 mile (1.6 km) north of the village of Thurleigh on farmland between the farms of Buryfields, Bletsoe Park, Manor, and Whitwickgreen. It was eventually modified to Air Ministry Class A airfield specifications, with three converging runways, extended in 1942 to lengths of 6,000 feet (runway 06-24) and 4,200 feet (runways 18-36 and 12-30). Thurleigh was unique among bomber bases in having four T2 type metal hangars where most bases had only two.

=== RAF Bomber Command use ===
Its first use was by No. 160 Squadron RAF, forming on 16 January 1942 as a ground echelon then deployed to the China-Burma-India Theater at RAF Drigh Road on 4 June 1942.

The airfield was also used by No. 18 Operational Training Unit RAF.

Other units

- No. 2813 Squadron RAF Regiment
- Central Gunnery School
- Radar Research Squadron

=== USAAF use ===
Thurleigh was one of 28 fields listed for use by the U.S. Eighth Air Force on 4 June 1942, tentatively designated station B-4, and was allocated on 10 August 1942. The RAF had found that the initial construction of Thurleigh was inadequate for the combat weight of B-24 bombers. After the departure of the RAF, Thurleigh's runways were lengthened, increased in thickness, and additional hardstands constructed to Class A standards so it could accommodate a USAAF heavy bomber group.

From 16 September 1943 though 25 June 1945, Thurleigh served as headquarters for the 40th Combat Bombardment Wing of the 1st Bomb Division.

==== 306th Bombardment Group (Heavy) ====
With the essential construction completed, the 306th Bombardment Group (Heavy) deployed to Thurleigh on 7 September 1942 from Wendover AAF Utah. The 306th was assigned to the 40th Combat Wing also at Thurleigh. The group tail code was a "Triangle H". Its operational squadrons were:

- 367th Bombardment Squadron (GY)
- 368th Bombardment Squadron (BO)
- 369th Bombardment Squadron (WW)
- 423d Bombardment Squadron (RD)

The group flew the Boeing B-17 Flying Fortress aircraft, and remained at Thurleigh until 1 December 1945. That was the longest tenure of any U.S. air group at a UK base.

At Thurleigh, the group operated primarily against strategic targets initially in occupied France and the Low Countries, then later in Germany. The group struck locomotive works at Lille, railway yards at Rouen, submarine pens at Bordeaux, shipbuilding yards at Vegesack, ball-bearing works at Schweinfurt, oil plants at Merseburg, marshalling yards at Stuttgart, a foundry at Hannover, a chemical plant at Ludwigshafen, aircraft factories at Leipzig, and numerous other targets on the Continent.

The 306th led the Eighth Air Force on its first mission to bomb a target in Germany on 27 January 1943, attacking U-boat yards at Wilhelmshaven, and suffered severe losses in attacks on Bremen on 16 April 1943, and in the Schweinfurt-Regensburg mission, 17 August 1943.

On 11 January 1944, without fighter escort and in the face of strong opposition, the 306th was part of a 1st Bombardment Division mission against aircraft factories in central Germany in which all groups were awarded a Distinguished Unit Citation. The 306th Bomb Group received a second DUC during Big Week, the intensive campaign against the German aircraft industry, when it effectively bombed an aircraft assembly plant at Bernberg on 22 February 1944, after poor weather forced other groups to abandon the mission.

The 306th Bomb Group flew its 342nd and final mission on 19 April 1945, the most of any Eighth Air Force B-17 unit except the 303rd Bomb Group. It compiled 9,614 sorties; dropped 22,575 tons of bombs; and had 171 B-17's fail to return from missions.

==== Twelve O'Clock High ====
Twelve O'Clock High was a 1949 film and book about bomber crews of the United States Army Air Forces who flew the initial daylight bombing missions against Germany during the Second World War. Twelve O'Clock High is frequently cited by surviving bomber crew members as the most accurate depiction by Hollywood of their life during the war. This film is used by both the British Royal Navy and U.S. Navy as an example of leadership styles in their Leadership and Management Training Schools for officers and enlisted personnel. The Air Force's College for Enlisted Professional Military Education also uses this film as an education aid in its non-commissioned officer (NCO) academies.

The protagonist of the story, Brigadier General Frank Savage, group commander of the fictional 918th Bomb Group, was possibly modelled on Colonel Frank A. Armstrong, a group commander of the 306th BG. The fictional counterparts of Thurleigh and the 306th Bomb Group were "Archbury" and the "918th Bomb Group," the number 918 being derived from 306 multiplied by 3. The opening scenes of the film were however filmed at former RAF Chelveston, a station several miles to the north where the 306th Bomb Group was based.

=== RAE Bedford ===
Starting in 1946, construction work began on the airfield to turn the site into what became known as the Royal Aircraft Establishment, Bedford. The runway was extended in the post-war period to accommodate the Bristol Brabazon aircraft (which required a very long runway) that ultimately never went into production. One local road was dropped into a cutting so that it would not sit above the level of the runway.

The airfield was decommissioned in February 1994 after a lengthy study determined that flight operations should be centralised at Boscombe Down in Wiltshire. Due to the cost and impracticality of relocating the Advanced Flight Simulator system, the site retains some of its development work (under the banner of QinetiQ from mid-2001 onwards) until QinetiQ sold their remaining stake in the Bedford Airfield site (as well as the nearby 'wind tunnel' site) and relocated the remaining staff to Farnborough Airfield in early 2008, finally ending the site's long association with military aviation.

The airfield was closed in 1997 with the RAE having become the Defence Evaluation and Research Agency (DERA). DERA consolidated its experimental flying operations at Boscombe Down, moving aircraft from Farnborough as well as Bedford.

== Current use ==
With the end of military control, the airfield has been divided into two parts. The southern part is now known as Thurleigh Business Park, and includes the runway, which is currently used for the mass storage of new cars and cars from the British government scrappage scheme, although it remains intact for possible future use. The northern part houses the Bedford Autodrome, as well as Thurleigh Museum which is dedicated primarily to the airfield and life in the area during the Second World War. The eastern end remains in aviation use as Bedford Aerodrome.

== See also ==
- RAF Twinwood Farm
- List of former Royal Air Force stations
