= Hundred of Willey =

Historical land division in Bedfordshire, England

Coordinates: 52.2°N 0.6°W

- Hundred
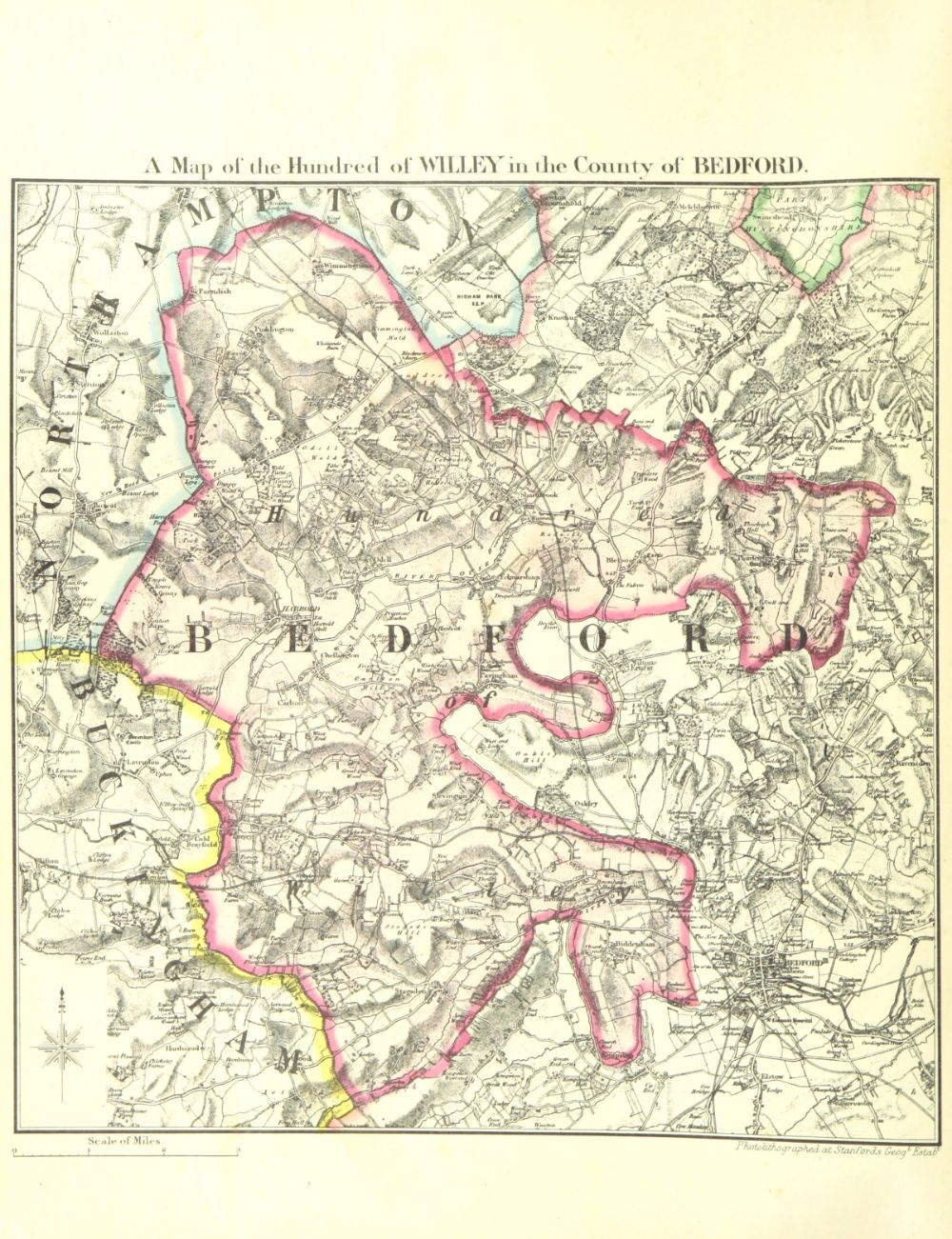
- Map of Hundred Willey, published 1872

- Location within the United Kingdom
- Country: England
- Sovereign state: United Kingdom
- Parishes: Biddenham, Bletsoe, Bromham, Carlton, Chellington, Farndish, Felmersham, Harrold, Odell, Pavenham, Podington, Sharnbrook, Souldrop, Stagsden, Stevington, Thurleigh, Turvey

The Hundred of Willey is a historical land division, a hundred in the northwest corner of Bedfordshire, England. Its northwestern boundary is the county border with Northamptonshire, and its southwestern boundary the border with Buckinghamshire. Some of its parishes and settlements lay on the River Great Ouse which flows through the hundred.

== Overview ==
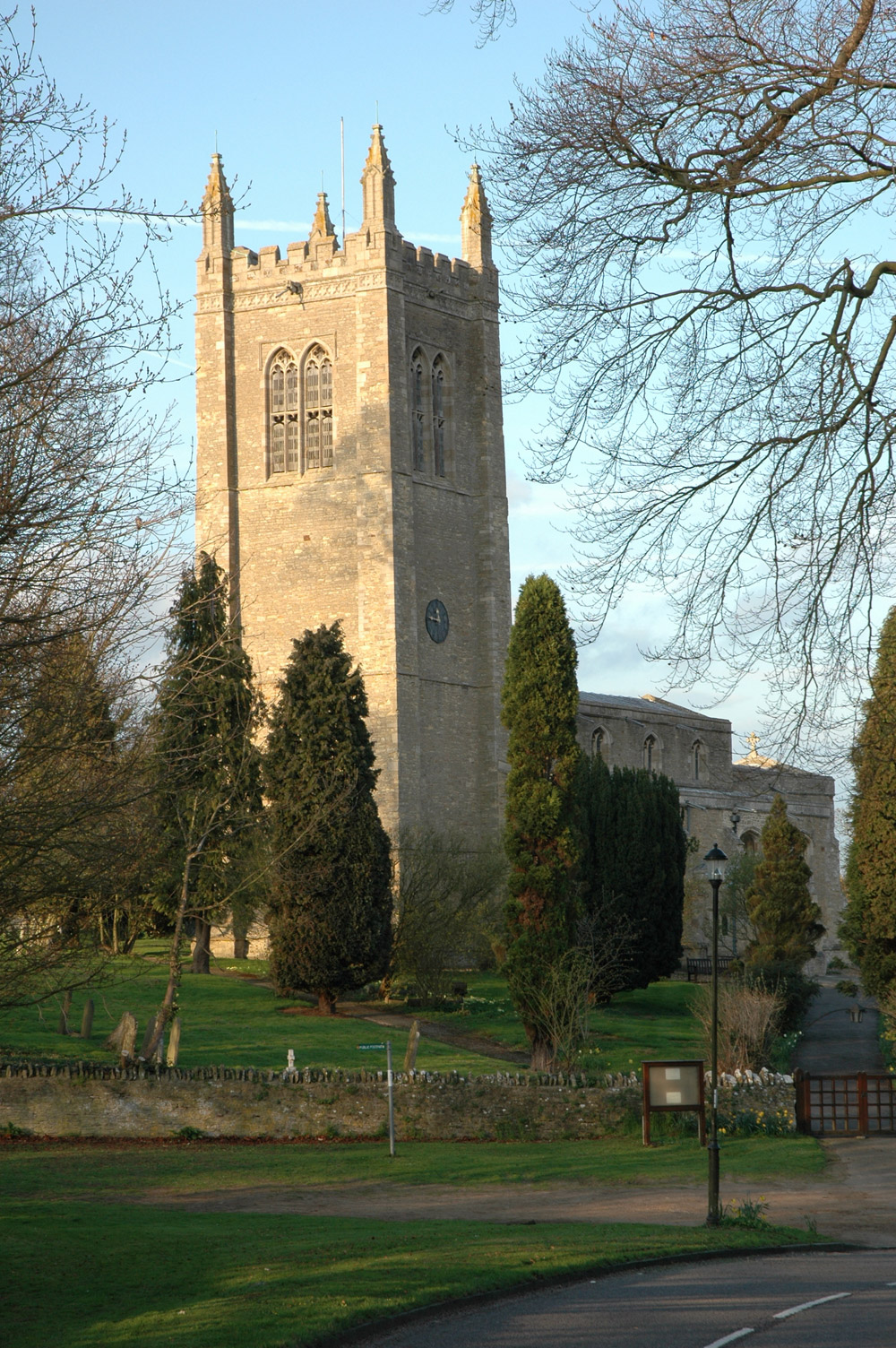
All Saints Church, Odell

The hundred of Willey was formed after King Edward the Elder subdued the Vikings of Bedford in 915 and constructed two burhs on each side of the River Ouse in Bedford. Willey, Barford, Stodden and the half-hundreds of Buckelow and Bedford were created to support the north Bedford burh. Willey consisted of 105 hides, which were situated in the following vills: Carlton, Chellington, Farndish, Felmersham with Radwell, Harrold, Odell, Podington with Hinwick, Sharnbrook, Thurleigh, Turvey, and Wymington. The name of the hundred is derived from Old English wēoh ‘an idol, a shrine’ and lēah ‘clearing, clearing in a wood’, denoting a clearing or grove with a pre-Christian shrine or temple.

The areas of these hundreds were intermingled - so Thurleigh was separated from the rest of the hundred by Bletsoe in the Buckelow half-hundred and Milton, Clapham and Milton Ernest (three vills within Stodden hundred) were separated from the rest of their hundred by Thurleigh and Bletsoe. This is taken as supporting the formation of these hundreds together as a unit of support for the same burh.

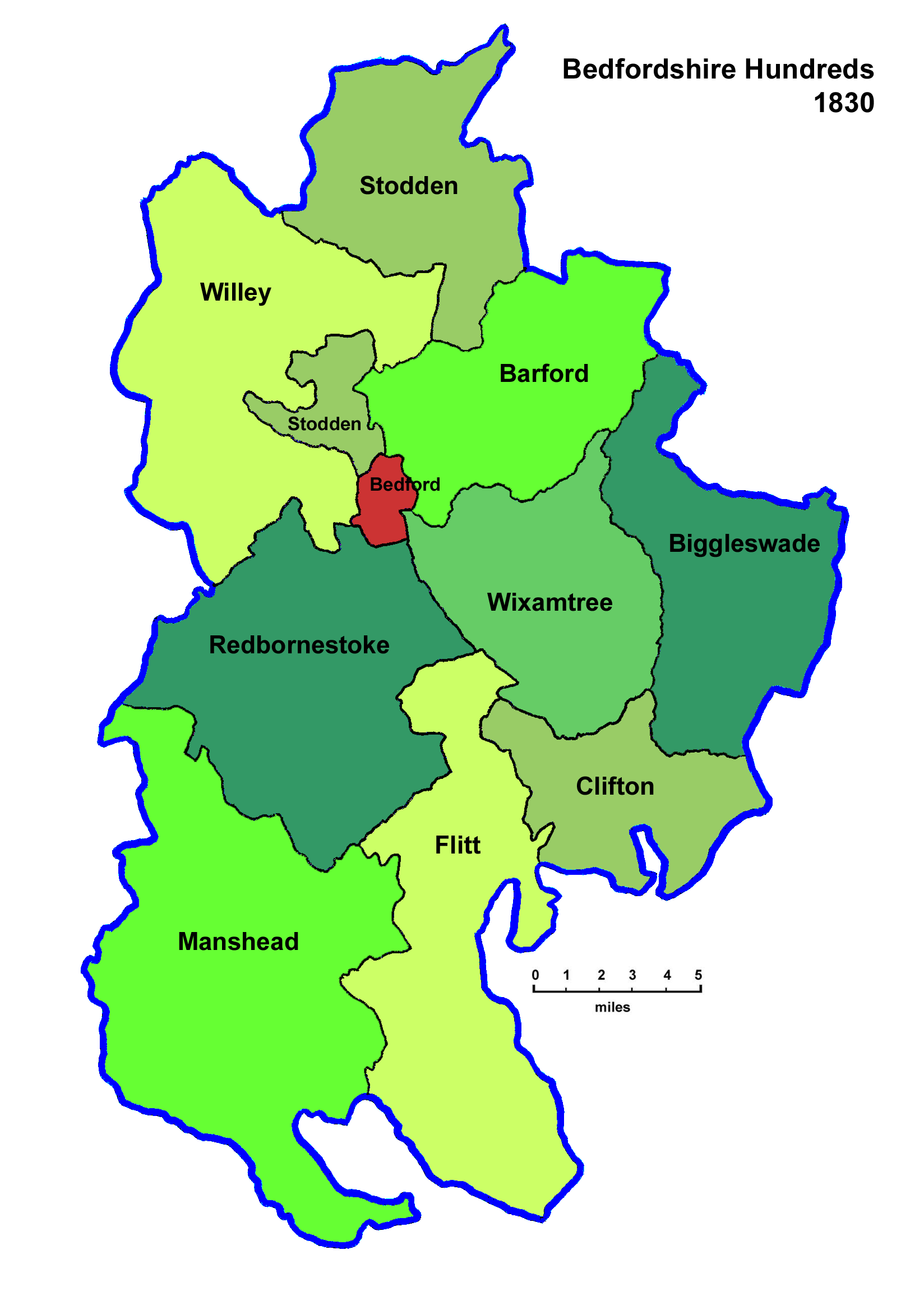
The Hundreds of Bedfordshire in 1830

It appears that the hundred of Willey and half-hundred of Buckelow were administered together, with Hugh de Willey recorded as the keeper of the bailiwick of Wilie and half bailiwick of Bukkelowe. At his death in 1278 his son Roger succeeded him; making the title appear hereditary. In the 17th century, the half-hundred of Buckelowe, comprising the vills of Biddenham, Bletsoe, Bromham, Pavenham, Stagsden, and Stevington, was formally merged with the hundred of Willey. Other parish combinations have included the parishes of Carlton and Chellington merging in 1934, and Farndish being absorbed into Podington with Hinwick parish.

Although there are many small settlements the majority of land in the hundred remains rural and is still used for farming. There is a railway line running close to the northeast border, however some stations on this line are now closed such as Sharnbrook closed in 1960. Today the area of the Hundred of Willey is within the Borough of Bedford.

== Parishes ==
The hundred contained the following parishes:

Biddenham, Bletsoe, Bromham, Carlton, Chellington, Farndish, Felmersham, Harrold, Odell, Pavenham, Podington, Sharnbrook, Souldrop, Stagsden, Stevington, Thurleigh, Turvey

== See also ==
- Hundreds of Bedfordshire
