= Hooton =

Hooton may refer to:

- Hooton (surname), a list of people
- Hooton, Cheshire, England
  - Hooton railway station

== See also ==
- Hooton Park, a disused aerodrome
- Hooton Levitt, South Yorkshire
- Hooton Pagnell, South Yorkshire
- Hooton Roberts, South Yorkshire
- Slade Hooton, South Yorkshire
- Hooten, a surname
- Houghton (disambiguation)
