= Leslie Prentice =

Australian-born English cricketer

Personal information
- Full name: Leslie Roff Vincent Prentice
- Born: 30 November 1886; Fitzroy, Victoria, Australia
- Died: 13 August 1928 (aged 41); Harrold, Bedfordshire, England
- Batting: Right-handed
- Bowling: Right-arm slow
- Role: Bowler

Domestic team information
- Years: Team
- 1920–1923: Middlesex
- 1920–1922: H. D. G. Leveson Gower's XI
- 1920: Gentlemen of the South
- FC debut: 13 May 1920; Middlesex v Oxford University
- Last FC: 16 May 1923; Middlesex v Oxford University

Career statistics
Competition	First-class
Matches	18
Runs scored	147
Batting average	6.39
100s/50s	0/0
Top score	42*
Balls bowled	1,674
Wickets	31
Bowling average	33.29
5 wickets in innings	1
10 wickets in match	0
Best bowling	6/95
Catches/stumpings	9/–
- Source: CricketArchive, 31 December 2007

Leslie Roff Vincent Prentice (30 November 1886 – 13 August 1928) was an Australian-born English cricketer. A right-handed batsman and right-arm slow bowler, he had a brief first-class cricket career for Middlesex in the early 1920s.

== Biography ==
Prentice was born in Fitzroy, a suburb of Melbourne, Victoria, on 30 November 1886. He played twice for the Federated Malay States against the Straits Settlements in 1913 and 1914. He made his first-class debut in May 1920 when he played for Middlesex against Oxford University. In his second first-class match, a County Championship match against Warwickshire at Lord's, he took 6/95 in the second innings, his only five-wicket haul in first-class cricket.

Prentice played three further County Championship matches for Middlesex in the 1920 season before playing two matches for H. D. G. Leveson Gower's XI against Oxford University and Cambridge University. He then played for the Gentlemen of the South against the Players of the South in July. During the 1921 season, he played six times for Middlesex before another two matches for H. D. G. Leveson Gower's XI against the two university teams.

Prentice did not play for Middlesex in the 1922 season, playing just once for H. D. G. Leveson Gower's XI against Oxford University. He played his final first-class match in the 1923 season when he played for Middlesex against Oxford University. He died on 13 August 1928 in Harrold, Bedfordshire, at the age of 41.
