= Harrold Hall =

Coordinates: 52.1996°N 0.6053°W

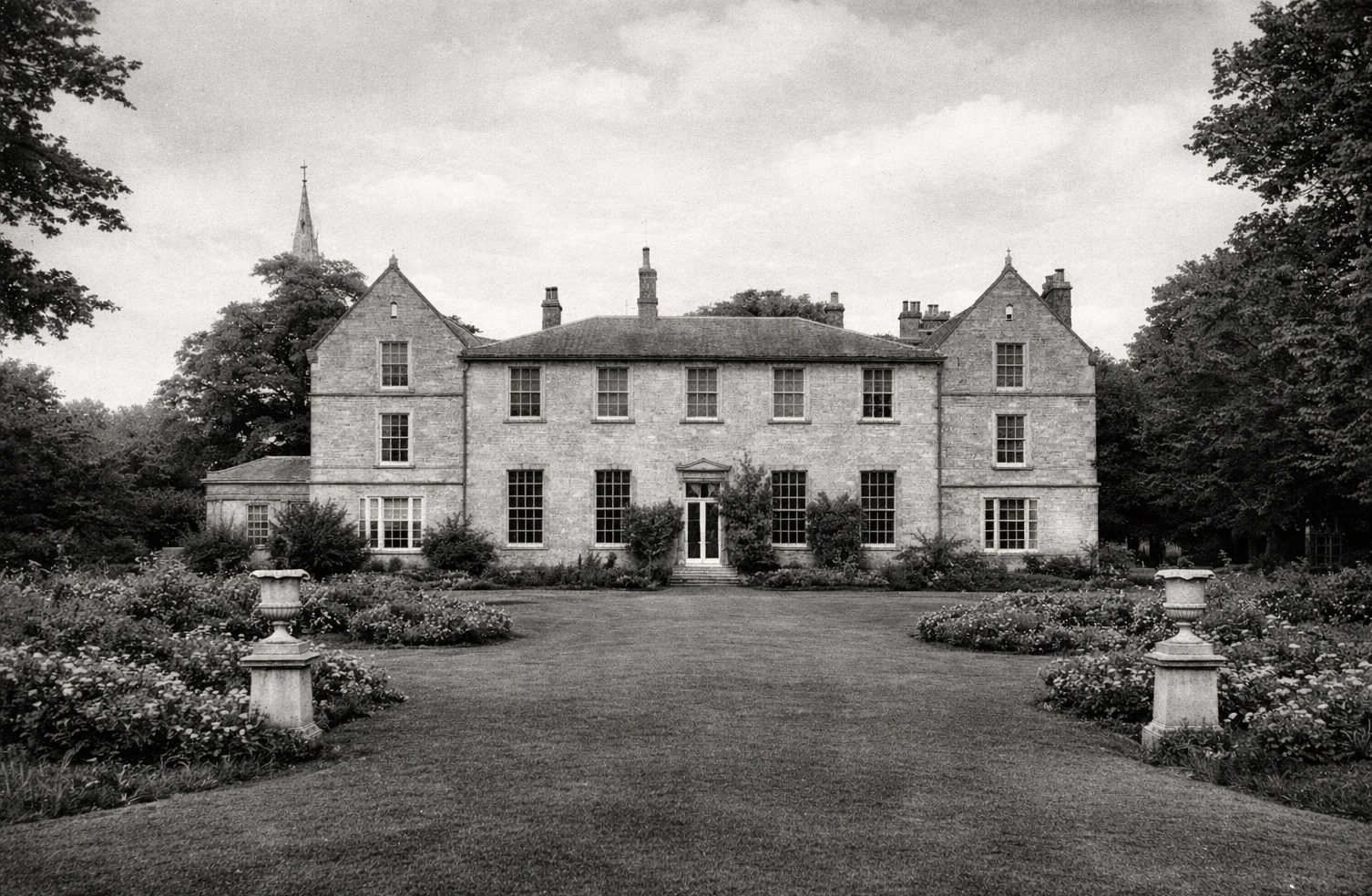
Harrold Hall

Harrold Hall was a country house in Harrold, Bedfordshire, England. Dated to 1210, the house was demolished in 1961.
