= RAE Bedford =

Private airfield in Bedfordshire, England

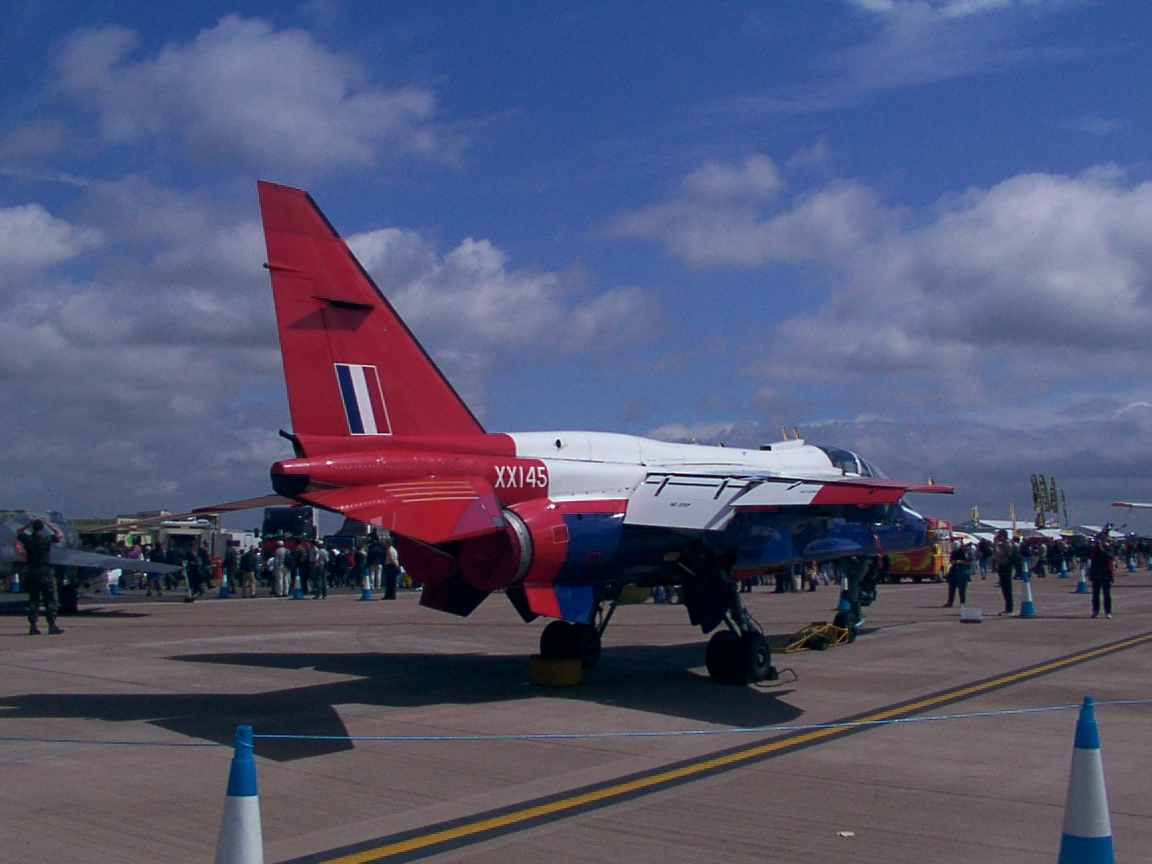
- The Jaguar was tested at RAE Bedford during the 1970s.
- IATA: none; ICAO: ~~EGVW~~

Summary
- Airport type: Disused RAF Airfield, Royal Aircraft Establishment
- Owner: Private
- Location: Thurleigh, Bedfordshire, England
- Elevation AMSL: 289 ft / 88 m
- Coordinates: 52°13′47″N 000°28′29″W

Map
- Location in Bedfordshire

Runways
Direction	Length		Surface
Direction	ft	m	Surface
~~05/23~~	~~6,000~~	~~1,829~~
~~11/29~~	~~4,200~~	~~1,280~~
~~18/36~~	~~4,200~~	~~1,280~~

RAE Bedford was a research site of the Royal Aircraft Establishment between 1946 and 1994. It undertook aircraft experimental development work.

RAE Bedford was located near to the village of Thurleigh, with an access road from neighbouring Clapham, north of the town of Bedford in England.

In the book A Short Illustrated History of the Royal Aircraft Establishment, Bedford, author Arthur Pearcy wrote that RAE Bedford is "the finest research and development establishment outside the USA."

Starting in 1946, construction work began to turn the wartime RAF Thurleigh airfield into what became known as the Royal Aeronautical Establishment, Bedford. The runway was extended in the post-war period to accommodate the Bristol Brabazon aircraft, which required a very long runway but which never went into production. A lot of the development for what became the Harrier was done here, one early version became known as the 'Flying Bedstead'. Also Thurleigh had a catapult runway and it was here that the 'ski jump' later fitted to some aircraft carriers was also developed. One local road was put in a cutting for a runway to be put above it, linking the Airfield site to the wind-tunnel site about a mile and a half away, although ultimately this was never carried out. The runway is some 10,500 ft long, and some 300 ft wide.

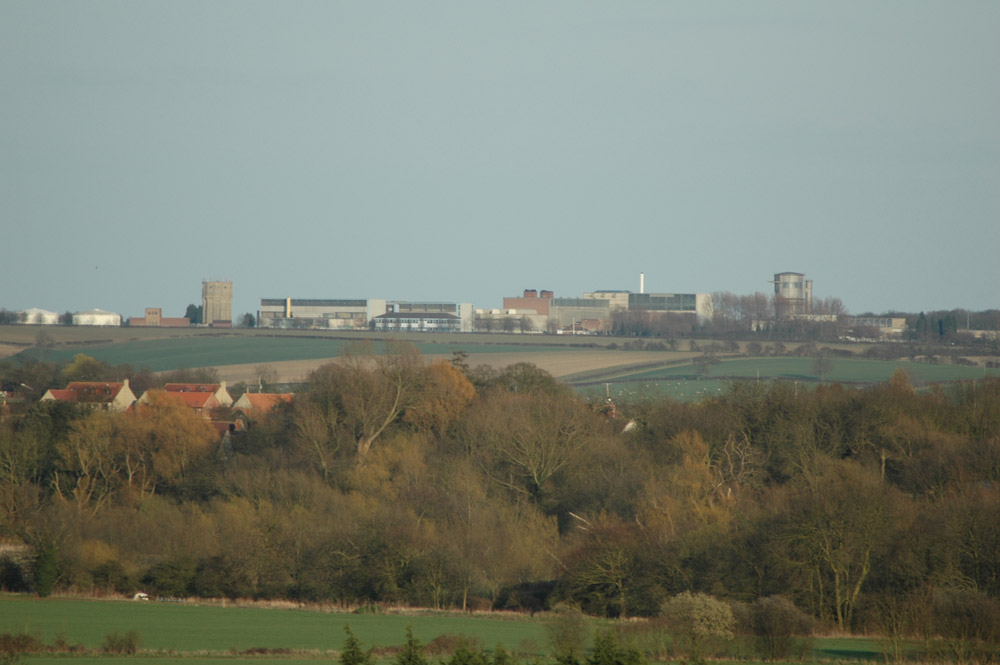
RAE Bedford seen from Odell

Naval Air Department and the BEA Helicopters Experimental Unit was here at some point.

The airfield was decommissioned in February 1994 after a lengthy study determined that flight operations should be centralised at Boscombe Down in Wiltshire. Due to the cost and impracticality of relocating the Advanced Flight Simulator system the site retains some of its development work (under the banner of QinetiQ from mid-2001 onwards). As of early 2007, QinetiQ have sold their remaining stake in the Bedford Airfield site (as well as the nearby 'Wind Tunnel' site) and are planning to relocate the remaining staff to Farnborough in early 2008, finally ending the site's long association with military aviation.

The airfield officially closed in March 1994 and sold in 1996 with the RAE having become the Defence Evaluation and Research Agency (DERA). DERA consolidated its experimental flying operations at Boscombe Down, moving aircraft from Farnborough Airfield as well as Bedford.

The site is now Bedford Autodrome. The wind tunnel site is now the Twinwoods Business Park and some of the buildings are in commercial use. Red Bull Racing use the remaining horizontal wind tunnel. The Vertical Spinning Tunnel (VST) was converted in 2005 by Bodyflight to be the first indoor skydiving wind tunnel in the UK, and at 16.4 ft in diameter remains the largest. On 1 March 2019, Historic England listed the VST as grade II due to its historic and architectural interest. The rest of the building was converted in 2007 and is used by Twinwoods Adventure as a multi-activity centre.

== See also ==
- RRE Defford
- RRE Pershore
