= Oakley railway station (Bedfordshire) =

Former railway station in England

Coordinates: 52.1729°N 0.5192°W

Oakley
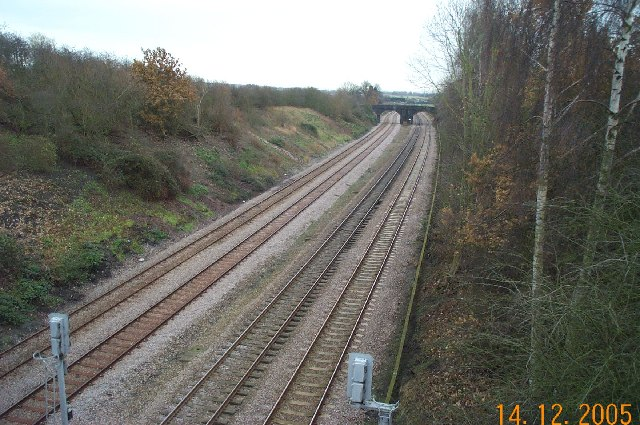
- The line near the site of the station in 2005

General information
- Location: Oakley, Borough of Bedford; England

Other information
- Status: Disused

History
- Original company: Midland Railway
- Pre-grouping: Midland Railway
- Post-grouping: London, Midland and Scottish Railway

Key dates
- 8 May 1857: Opened
- 15 September 1958: Closed (passenger)
- 1963: Closed (goods)
Location

Oakley railway station was built by the Midland Railway in 1857 on its extension from Leicester to Bedford and Hitchin.

It was closed to passengers in 1958 and closed completely in 1963. The station buildings remain in a dilapidated state though the goods yard is used by a haulage company. There are also a set of railway houses the opposite side of the line from the station building which were constructed between 1883 and 1901 as accommodation for railway workers which remain extant.

About 1 mile (1.6 km) north of the station is the point where the Midland installed its first troughs to allow locomotives to pick up water. The river valley here is very flat, and the line crosses it seven times in the space of about 7 miles (11 km) most prominently on the viaduct (which is two separate viaducts running parallel to each other) to the north of the village. The line is elevated because of problems with flooding. Even the local roads have raised walkways.

Croxhall opened in 1840 by the Birmingham and Derby Junction Railway was previously known as Oakley but was renamed on 1 December previously.

Two fatal railway accidents occurred around Oakley. One occurred on 21 January 1938 at the Junction between the Midland Main Line and the Bedford–Northampton line to the south of the village, when an Express train collided with an empty stock movement killing three and injuring eight. The other accident occurred 4 October 1949 on the viaduct that takes the Midland Main Line over the River Great Ouse to the north of the village, where a goods train collided with a stationary goods train on the viaduct, driving the goods train off of the viaduct and into a meadow, blocking the goods lines on the viaduct and killing the driver and the fireman.

== Route ==
Preceding station	Historical railways	Following station
Sharnbrook	Midland Railway; Midland Main Line	Bedford
