= Chellington =

Village in Bedfordshire, England

Coordinates: 52.196184°N 0.592713°W

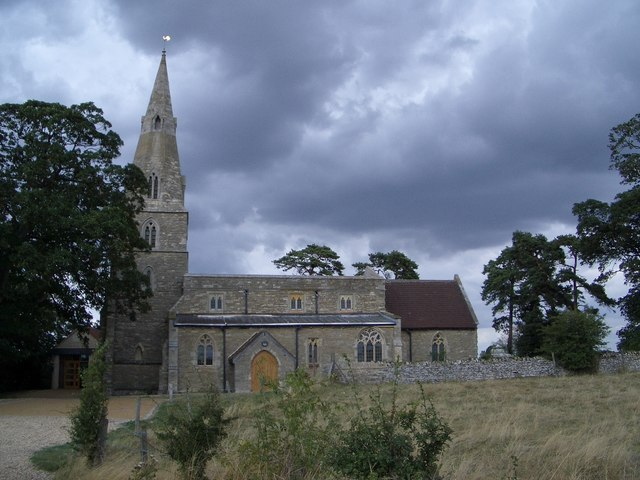
- Church of St Nicholas

- Location within Bedfordshire
- Civil parish: Carlton and Chellington
- Unitary authority: Bedford
- Ceremonial county: Bedfordshire
- Region: East
- Country: England
- Sovereign state: United Kingdom
- Post town: BEDFORD
- Postcode district: MK43
- Police: Bedfordshire
- Fire: Bedfordshire
- Ambulance: East of England
- UK Parliament: North Bedfordshire

Chellington is a village in the civil parish of Carlton and Chellington, in the Bedford borough of Bedfordshire, England. It is situated approximately 7 miles (11 km) north-west of Bedford town centre.

Chellington was recorded in the Domesday Book of 1086 as a parish within the Hundred of Willey. In 1934 the parish was merged with the neighbouring parish of Carlton to form a new parish called Carlton and Chellington. At the 1931 census (the last before the abolition of the parish), Chellington had a population of 78.
