= Bedford Autodrome =

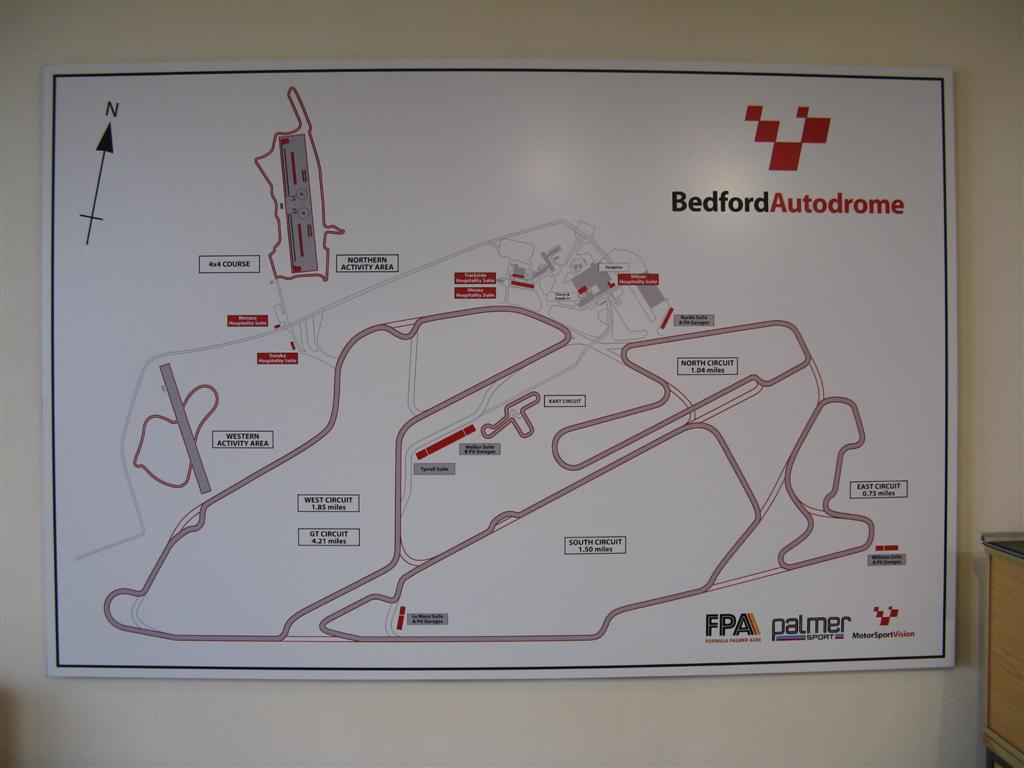
- The layout of the track
- Location: Thurleigh, Bedfordshire, England
- Coordinates: 52°14′1″N 0°28′20″W
- Owner: Jonathan Palmer
- Former names: RAE Bedford

Bedford Autodrome is an autodrome based on the former site of RAE Bedford, in the village of Thurleigh, Bedfordshire. It is owned by former Formula One driver Jonathan Palmer's MotorSport Vision organisation.

== The autodrome ==
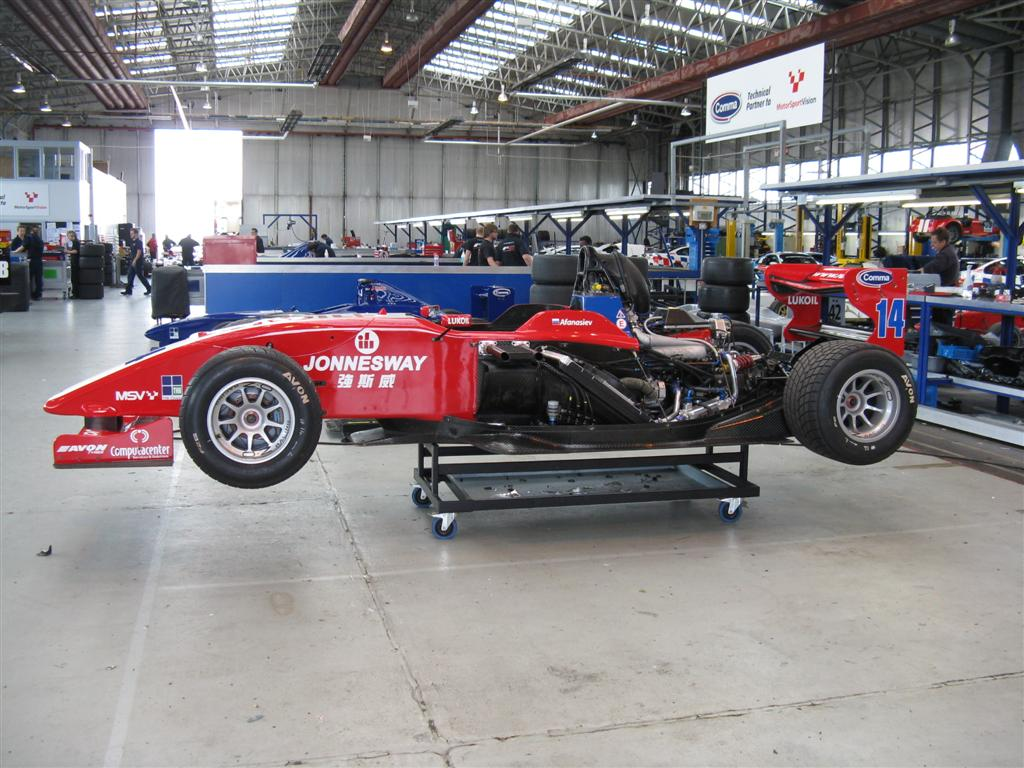
Cars on display at the autodrome

It is built on the northern section of the former site of the Royal Aerospace Establishment Bedford, a former Royal Air Force airfield and took five years to convert to a track using the latest in track-laying techniques to provide a quiet and smooth surface.

It was designed to be driven by high performance road cars and as such has larger than usual run off areas and does not have sections of Armco safety barriers which would potentially damage a car seriously if it left the track. Because the track has no Armco it is not eligible to hold races there or have an area for spectators due to the inability to ensure their safety.

Bedford Autodrome was used as an official training site for the 2012 Summer Olympics and Paralympics.

Sections of the main and secondary runways at the aerodrome were utilised for vehicle storage in relation to the UK vehicle scrappage scheme that ran between 2009 and 2010. A petition to the UK Government requesting allowance for recommissioning and resale of classic vehicles from this stockpile was submitted in March 2016, but ultimately rejected.

== Use as an airfield ==
Bedford Aerodrome
- IATA: none; ICAO: EGBF

Summary
- Airport type: Private
- Operator: MotorSport Vision Ltd.
- Location: Thurleigh
- Elevation AMSL: 273 ft / 83 m

Map
- Location in Bedfordshire

Runways
Direction	Length		Surface
Direction	m	ft	Surface
08/26	1,095	3,593	Concrete
- Sources: UK AIP at NATS

The autodrome has its own private aerodrome located on one of the former runways.

=== The 306th Bombardment Group Museum ===
The 306th Bombardment Group Museum is a small museum located within the Bedford Autodrome complex. The museum itself is housed in one of the few remaining buildings on the original airfield, now Bedford Aerodrome, built during the Second World War. The museum is primarily concerned with the Second World War and the history of the airfield and has a collection of artifacts assembled to re-create the activities and atmosphere of the airfield and surrounding area during the war years. The museum is supported and funded by the 306th Bombardment Group.

== Appearances in video games ==
- In rFactor, the track is one of the tracks available for download to be added into the game.
- The many configurations of the track are also available to be driven on in TOCA Race Driver 3.
