= Tanganda Tea =

Zimbabwean tea

Tanganda Tea is the biggest grower and producer of tea and coffee in Zimbabwe and one of the biggest tea producers in Africa. It is a competing food corporation in Zimbabwe, and forms part of the Meikles Group, a major Zimbabwean company which also owns hotels and department stores in southern Africa.

Tanganda is based in Mutare in the Eastern Highlands of Zimbabwe. The first tea bushes planted in Zimbabwe originated from a box of seeds smuggled out of India in 1924 by Mrs Florence Phillips, a tea-planter's wife from Assam, and were planted near Chipinge. The success of the harvest encouraged the formation of a company, Ward and Phillips (Pty) Ltd, which owned New Year's Gift and Ratelshoek Estates near Chipinge, and which formed the nucleus of the Tanganda Tea company. The bulk of the company's tea is still grown around Chipinge, although the company now buys in substantial amounts of tea from small-scale independent growers.

Tanganda Tea sells its brand of tea in Zimbabwe and throughout central Africa.
