= Harrold Calvados Society =

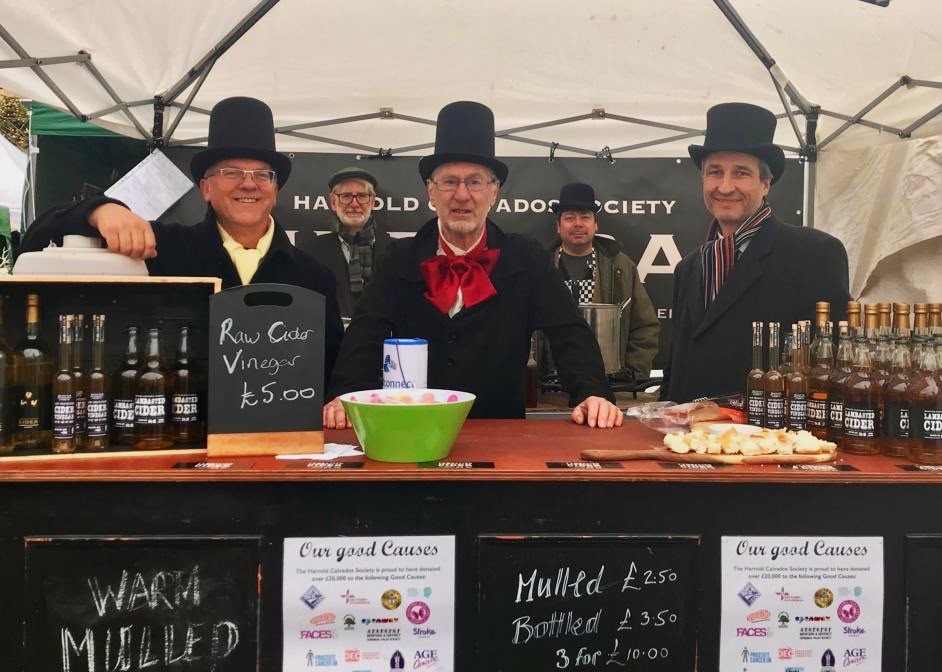
Harrold Calvados Society stall

The Harrold Calvados Society is a cider-making group based in the village of Harrold, North Bedfordshire, England. It operates entirely through the work of its volunteer members, donating all profits to local charities, having raised nearly £50,000 since its foundation in 2004. Monies are distributed each year to causes such as Cold Relief, Sue Ryder Care, Riding for the Disabled, Dine With Us, and Prostate Cancer initiatives.

Making use of locally donated apples where possible, the Society sells up to 2,000 litres of cider per year. The main product is branded Lambasted Cider, available in draught, bottled, and mulled varieties; the Society also makes a distilled cider spirit (akin to Calvados), and a cider vinegar. These are sold from stalls at regional markets and village events, and in local outlets such as pubs and restaurants.

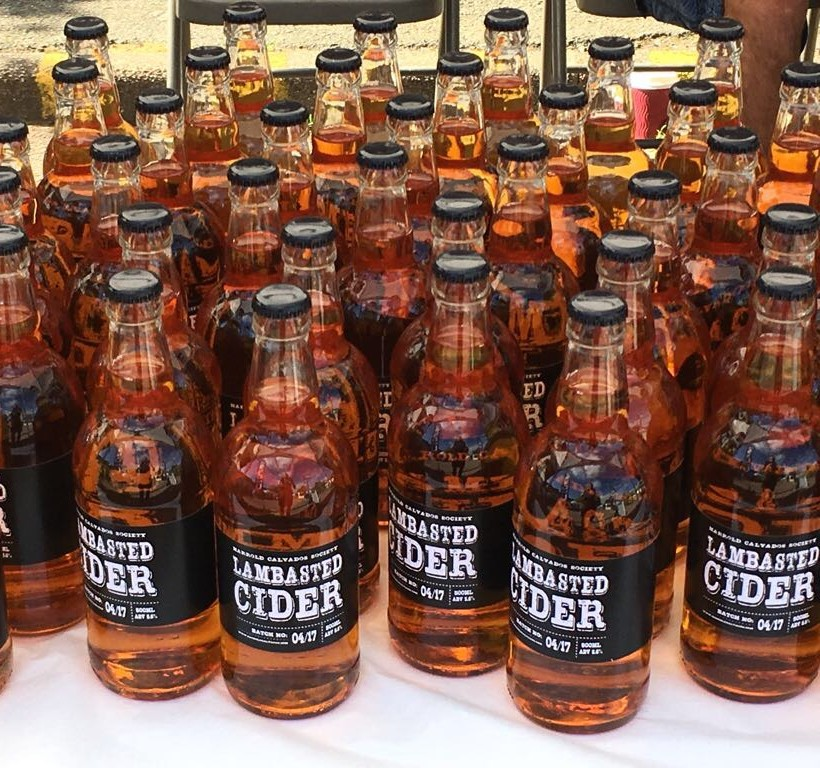
Lambasted cider at Harrold Calvados Society stall
