= Sharnbrook railway station =

Former railway station in England

Coordinates: 52.2254°N 0.5318°W

Sharnbrook
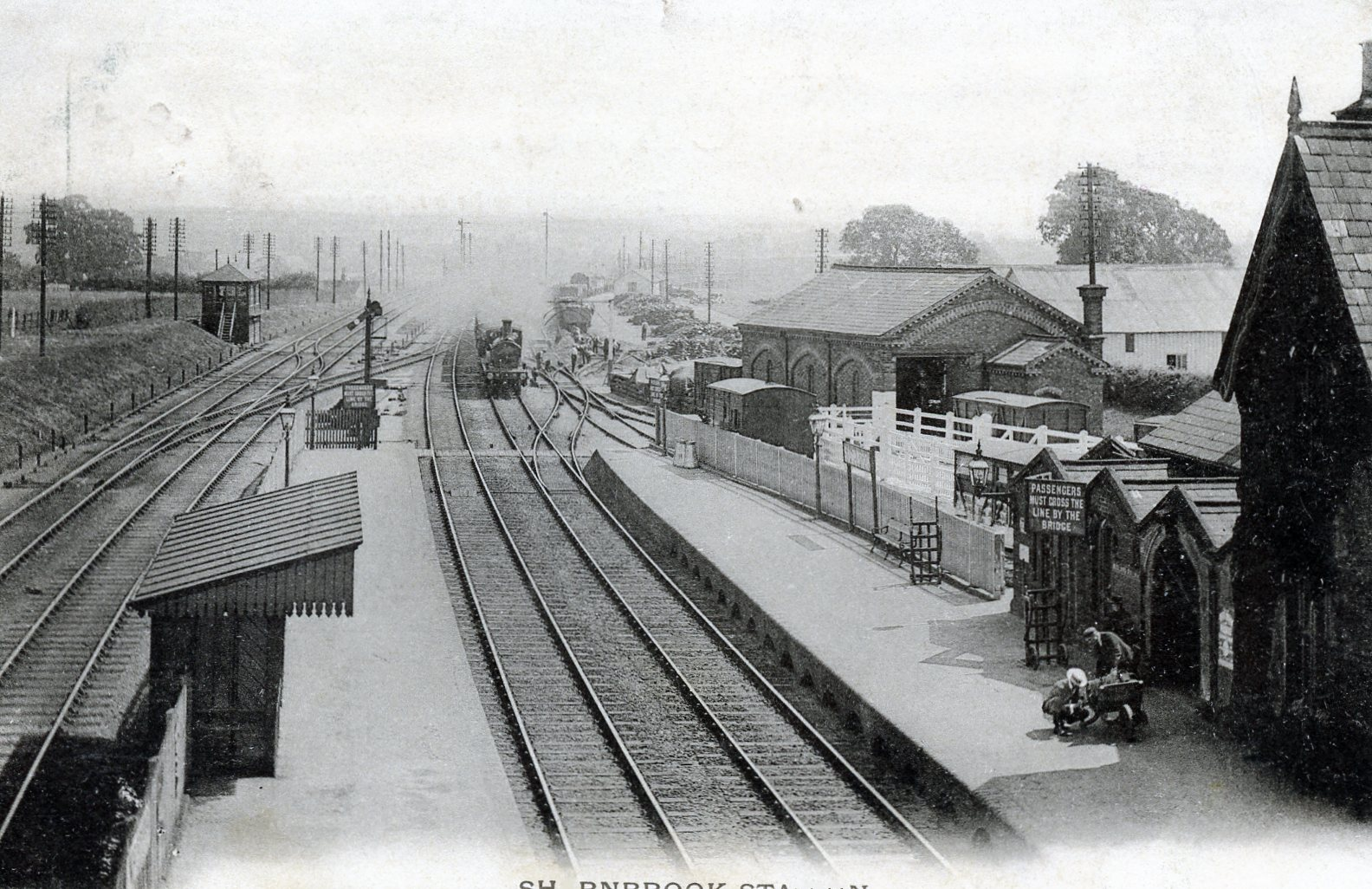

General information
- Location: Sharnbrook, Borough of Bedford; England
- Platforms: 2

Other information
- Status: Disused

History
- Original company: Midland Railway
- Pre-grouping: Midland Railway
- Post-grouping: London, Midland and Scottish Railway

Key dates
- 1857: Opened
- 1960: Closed
Location

Sharnbrook railway station was opened in 1857 by the Midland Railway to serve the village of Sharnbrook in Bedfordshire, England. It was on the Midland's extension from Leicester to Bedford and Hitchin.

It was situated near to Sharnbrook Summit. Here, originally there was a 1 in 119 gradient from the south taking the line to 340 feet above sea level. Around 1880, the line was quadrupled, with the new goods tracks taken through 1,800 yd (1,600 m) long Sharnbrook Tunnel. Following this, in 1884, a long curve, the Wymington Deviation allowed the ruling gradient on the slow/goods lines to be reduced to 1 in 200.

It closed in 1960 and the station buildings were subsequently demolished.

The slow/goods lines were singled and put up to passenger standard in 1987. As of 2007 they see one train a day plus occasional engineering diversions, such as on the weekend 6/7 May 2007.

Quadruple track was restored between Sharnbrook Junction and Kettering South Junction in 2020; electrification was in progress as at September, 2020. The existing Down Slow remains signalled for bi-directional use; the Up Slow is signalled for use in that direction only.

== Stationmasters ==
- H. Robinson until 1861 (afterwards station master at Thorpe)
- Joseph Wright 1861 - ca .1864 (formerly station master at Finedon)
- William G. Hawkins ca. 1869 - 1873
- William Grant 1873 - 1885 (formerly stationmaster at Barrow upon Soar, afterwards station master at Codnor Park and Ironville)
- Edwin Hoe 1885 - 1898 (formerly station master at Finedon)
- John V. Hawkins 1898 - ca. 1916
- W.E. Turner 1924 - 1931 (afterwards station master at Kegworth)
- J.A. Dowdeswell 1931 - 1938 (formerly station master at Swannington)
- A.J. Chamberlain 1938 - 1939
- Harold Joseph Miller 1939 - 1948 (formerly station master at East Horndon)
- W.H. Shepperson 1948 - 1959 (afterwards station master at Selly Oak)

== Route ==
Preceding station	Historical railways	Following station
Irchester	Midland Railway; Midland Main Line	Oakley
