= Amanda Hooton =

Australian journalist

Amanda Hooton is an Australian journalist and columnist and a senior writer with Good Weekend. Her work has appeared in the Sydney Morning Herald and The Age "Good Weekend" Magazine is a supplement that is distributed with those newspapers. She has also provided articles and worked for Stuff.co.nz, The Sunday Age, The Canberra Times, Brisbane Times, WAtoday, Domain, Newcastle Herald, Essential Baby, Illawarra Mercury, Bendigo Advertiser, Queensland Country Life, Shoalhaven & Nowra News, Stock & Land, North Queensland Register, Narooma News, Bay Post / Moruya Examiner, Crookwell Gazette.

She has won a Walkley award in 2005 and a British Press Award in 1997.
