= Hooten =

Hooten is a surname. Notable people with the name include:

- David B. Hooten (born 1962), American musician and politician
- Jason Hooten (born 1969), American basketball coach
- Max Hooten (born 2001), American Entrepreneur
- Katie Hooten, American producer and actress
- Leon Hooten (born 1948), American baseball player
- Peter Hooten (born 1950), American actor

== See also ==
- Hooten & the Lady, British television series
- E.E. Hooten House, historic house
- The Hooten Hallers, blues-rock band
- Hooton (disambiguation)
