= Charles Hooton =

English novelist and journalist

Charles Hooton (10 May 1810 – 16 February 1847) was an English novelist and journalist.

== Life and works ==
Hooton's first novel, The Adventures of Bilberry Thurland, was published in 1836, while he was editor of a newspaper in Leeds. He moved to London about 1837, and published in Bentley's Miscellany a novel, Colin Clink (republished in three volumes in 1841 with illustrations by John Leech). He was sub-editor of The True Sun and editor of The Woolsack, both short-lived newspapers, in the one attacking political economy and the other the court of chancery.

He left for Texas, where for nine months he led an almost savage life. He afterwards attempted newspaper work in New Orleans, New York, and Montreal, and then returned to England in failing health. He wrote a series of ballads for The New Monthly Magazine, describing American life and literature, and a novel Launcelot Wedge, which was running in Ainsworth's Magazine at the time of his death (republished in three volumes in 1849). He died on 16 February 1847, at his father's home in Nottingham, from an overdose of morphia.

Two further works were published posthumously: St. Louis' Isle, or Texiana, with Additional Observations made in the United States and in Canada, 1847; and Woodhouselee, or the Astrologer, in three volumes, 1848.
