= Thurleigh =

Village in Bedfordshire, England

Coordinates: 52.21468°N 0.457835°W

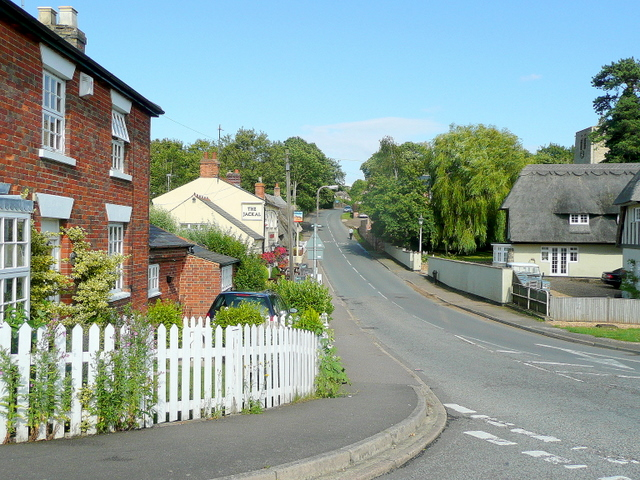
- Thurleigh High Street

- Location within Bedfordshire
- Population: 696; 694 (2011 Census)
- OS grid reference: TL053585
- Unitary authority: Bedford
- Ceremonial county: Bedfordshire
- Region: East
- Country: England
- Sovereign state: United Kingdom
- Post town: Bedford
- Postcode district: MK44
- Dialling code: 01234
- Police: Bedfordshire
- Fire: Bedfordshire
- Ambulance: East of England
- UK Parliament: North Bedfordshire

Thurleigh is a village and civil parish in the Borough of Bedford, north Bedfordshire, England, situated around 5 miles (8.0 km) north of Bedford town centre.

== History ==
Excavations have shown evidence the locality was occupied in the Iron-Age, Roman and Saxon periods.

In Domesday of 1086 the Middle English orthography as to both modern 'th' digraph sounds was often in different forms particularly as to this county — the place is LaLega. By 1372 it is Thyrleye. In 1813, Thurleigh, or Thurley, is recorded as being in the Hundred of Willey and the Deanery of Eaton. The scribes were particularly ecclesiastical for the county as Lega is a very Latin-esque form of leigh. The latter is a very common word, rarely used today for meadow or clearing (lea) almost certainly an Anglo-Saxon word perhaps preceded by the definite article, as early written in unrelated prose þǣre lēa. Being in the Danelaw however a link to Thor cannot be ruled out.

There was a church here in Saxon times. The current church has some parts still dating from around 1150, and at about that same time a castle was built here.

The deanery of Eaton contains the rectories of Bolnhurst, Colmworth, Shelton, Staughton Parva, Tilbrook, Wilden and Yelden; the vicarages of Eaton Socon, Keysoe, Melchburn, Pertenhall, Renhold, Ravensden, Riseley, Roxton, Great Barford and Thurleigh; and the perpetual curacy of Dean.

=== Airfield ===
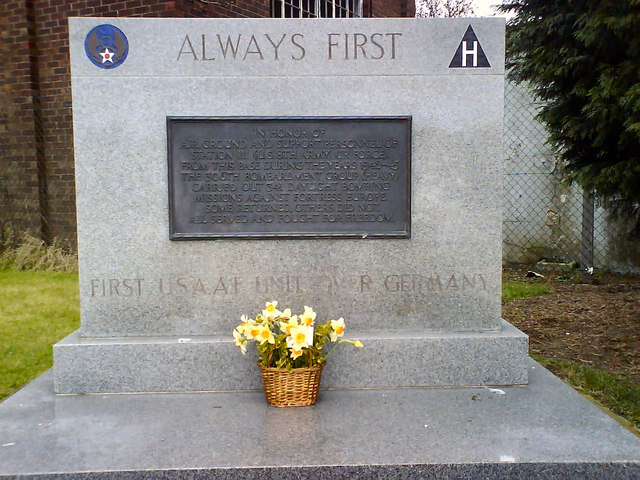
Thurleigh WWII USA Memorial – geograph.org.uk – 386824

In 1941, during World War II, an airfield known as RAF Thurleigh was constructed on a plateau just north of the village for RAF Bomber Command. It was used initially for training both RAF and Polish personnel, but in 1942 was turned over to the USAAF and four squadrons of B-17 Flying Fortresses moved in, and over the next three years flew 341 bombing missions. A memorial to these men stands in the village. Events and characters from the USAAF's time at Thurleigh were used as the basis of the novel and film Twelve O'Clock High.

After the war the airfield was used by the Royal Aeronautical Establishment for research and development work. The runway was extended, necessitating the closure of the road between Thurleigh and Keysoe, and the demolition of the hamlet of Backnoe End.

In 1968–71 the Commission for the Third London Airport (the "Roskill Commission") considered Thurleigh as one of its four short-listed sites, along with Cublington, Foulness (later known as Maplin Sands) and Nuthampstead.

The RAE was largely closed down in the 1990s and the site is now used by various commercial enterprises.

== Geography ==
Thurleigh is about 6 miles (10 km) north of the county town of Bedford. As well as the village centre, the parish is spread across five "Ends", local parlance for a hamlet – Church End, Cross End, Scald End, Backnoe End and Park End, covering an area of about six square miles. The land is undulating boulder clay, ranging in height from 200 ft. to 275 ft. above sea level. A stream runs through the Parish to the south forming a valley which cuts through to the underlying Oxford Clay. The countryside around is in the main used for arable farming. A former airfield to the north of the village is now a business park and motor sports track. There are only minor roads in the parish, though the A6 and B660 are just a few miles away. These roads however are used as a rat run and a 2007 survey recorded 600 vehicles per hour on Mill Road during the morning and evening rush hours, and 121 HGVs throughout the day.

== Demography ==
The population of the civil parish, recorded in the 2001 census, is 696, and their mean age is 38.6 years with 88 of the people being over the age of 65 years. 372 of the population are considered to be economically active. There were 272 dwellings, of which 9 were unoccupied.

== Economy ==
Part of the site of the former airfield now accommodates Thurleigh Business Park, and the runway is currently used for storage of cars. Another part of the site is used by Bedford Autodrome, a corporate hospitality centre. This includes Thurleigh Museum which is dedicated primarily to the airfield and life in the area during World War 2. Other major employers include Jackson Demolition, Monster Events, Star Hire and a number of agricultural businesses.

== Community, sport and recreation ==
Regular events are held at the Village Hall, the Church, the Playing Field Club and the parish's only pub, the Jackal. There has been a hall in the village since 1927, and the current building dates from the 1980s. A youth club meets there bi-monthly. The playing field is used for cricket and football, and has a small children's play area. It is a registered charity. The Playing Field Club, built in the 1970s, provides changing rooms for the cricket team, which is the only organised sports team in the village. There are about 30 miles (48 km) of footpaths and bridleways within the parish. There are a few bus services that stop in the village.

Thurleigh Primary School and Pre-School takes children aged between 2½ and 11 years old, and Breakfast Club and After-School extends the hours of care for the children of working parents. Older children are served by Sharnbrook Academy.

== Landmarks ==
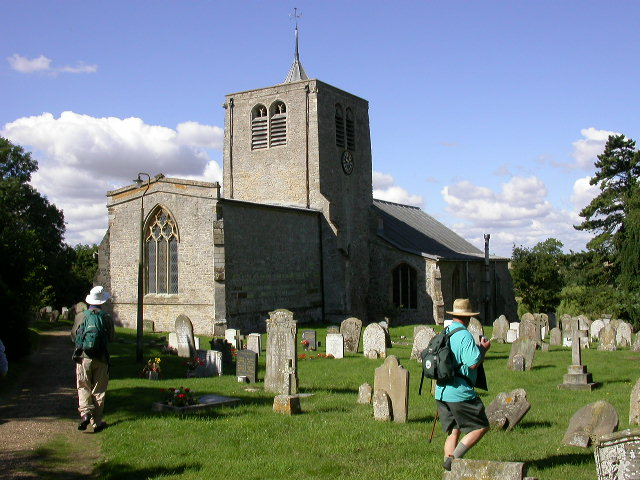
St Peter’s Church, Thurleigh

The Parish Church of Saint Peter is a grade II* listed building dating from approximately 1130, with 14th- and 15th-century additions and restored in the 1880s. The former vicarage was finished in 1750 for vicar Robert Lerogne. Other listed buildings include a windmill tower, built c.1890, and dwellings dating mainly from the 17th,18th and 19th centuries. The Baptist Chapel was built in 1888 on the same site as an earlier building. Thurleigh Castle was a medieval timber, motte-and-bailey, castle, but only earthworks survive today. In addition to the USAAF memorial previously mentioned, there is a War Memorial near the church to the men of the village who gave their lives in two world wars. Part of the village is a conservation area.
