= Sharnbrook =

Village in Bedfordshire, England

Coordinates: 52.2166°N 0.5333°W

- Location within Bedfordshire
- Population: 2,293 (2011 Census)
- OS grid reference: SP994596
- Unitary authority: Bedford
- Ceremonial county: Bedfordshire
- Region: East
- Country: England
- Sovereign state: United Kingdom
- Post town: BEDFORD
- Postcode district: MK44
- Dialling code: 01234
- Police: Bedfordshire
- Fire: Bedfordshire
- Ambulance: East of England
- UK Parliament: North Bedfordshire

Sharnbrook is a village and civil parish located in the Borough of Bedford in Bedfordshire, England, situated around 7 miles (11 km) north-west of Bedford town centre.

The settlement was recorded in the Domesday Book of 1086 as a parish within the Hundred of Willey but was probably first developed in Saxon times. The oldest surviving building, St Peter's Church, is Norman. The name is believed to be derived from the Anglo Saxon word sharn meaning dung. Many of the older buildings in the village are constructed of the local oolitic limestone, also used in other traditional north Bedfordshire settlements.

Situated just north of a loop in the River Great Ouse and almost due north of Bedford, the village has developed as a ribbon-settlement running south-east to north-west, with the core of the community clustered at the north-western end.

== Education ==
The village has two schools. The larger, Sharnbrook Academy, has a campus on the west of the village and serves a wide area. It was attended by the marathon world record holder Paula Radcliffe, who opened the Paula Radcliffe Sharnbrook Community Sports Centre named after her in April 2005, used by both students and the wider local community. The village's other school is Sharnbrook Primary which caters for local children aged from 3–11 years.

== Industry ==
Another major presence is the multinational company Unilever which has the Lipton Institute of Tea research centre on the north-western edge of the village. This uses the grounds of Colworth House, originally built in the early 17th century and rebuilt in its present form by 1774 as a private house. The house itself is used as office space, with modern laboratory buildings beside and behind it. The site is being turned into a science park for use by a number of companies.

== Sport ==
Sharnbrook is home to the village's boys' and men's football teams, which predate by many years the women's team that was established in 2002.

== Transport ==
Sharnbrook railway station opened in 1857, but was closed in 1960.

Sharnbrook is served by bus service 50 which is operated by Stagecoach and operates between Kettering and Bedford. The service is hourly Monday to Saturday and two hourly on Sundays and Bank Holidays.

== Literature ==
Sharnbrook is the village where the prototype of Uncle Silas, Joseph Betts, the protagonist of H.E. Bates's My Uncle Silas lived.

== Wildlife ==
Sharnbrook is home to a colony of red kites.

== Gallery ==
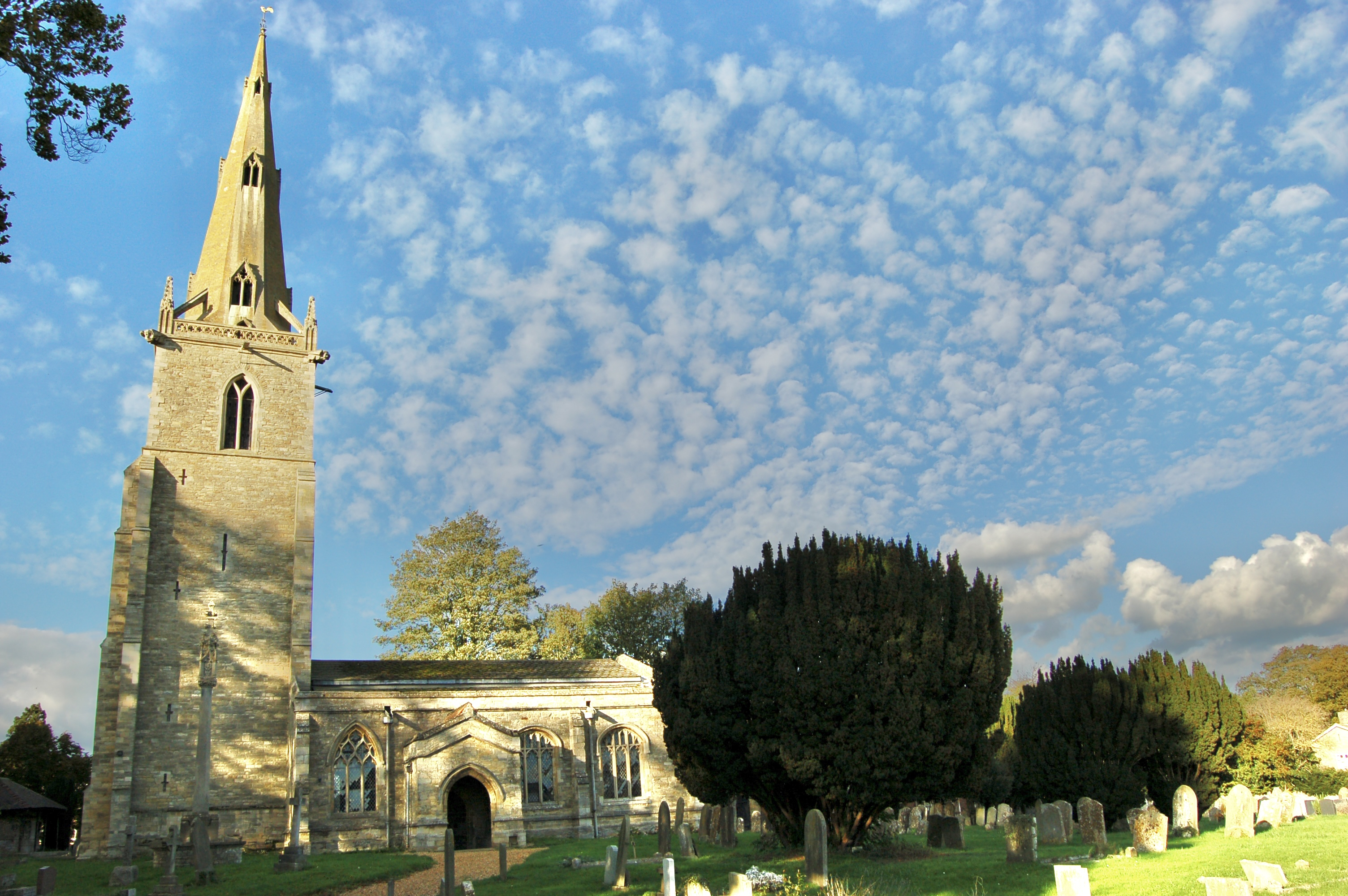
St Peter's Church

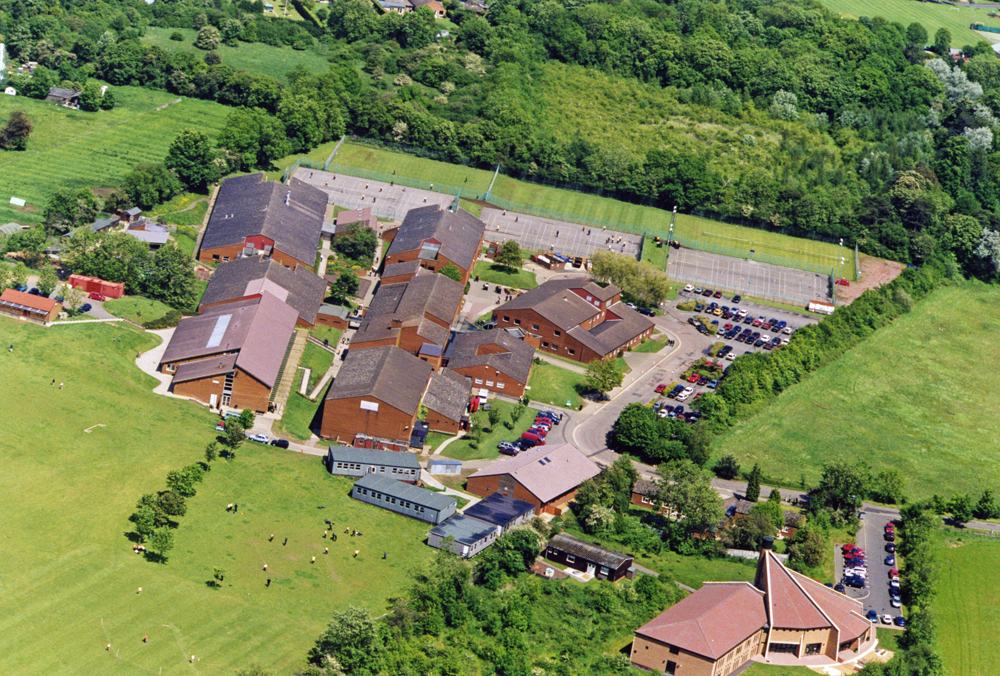
Sharnbrook Upper School

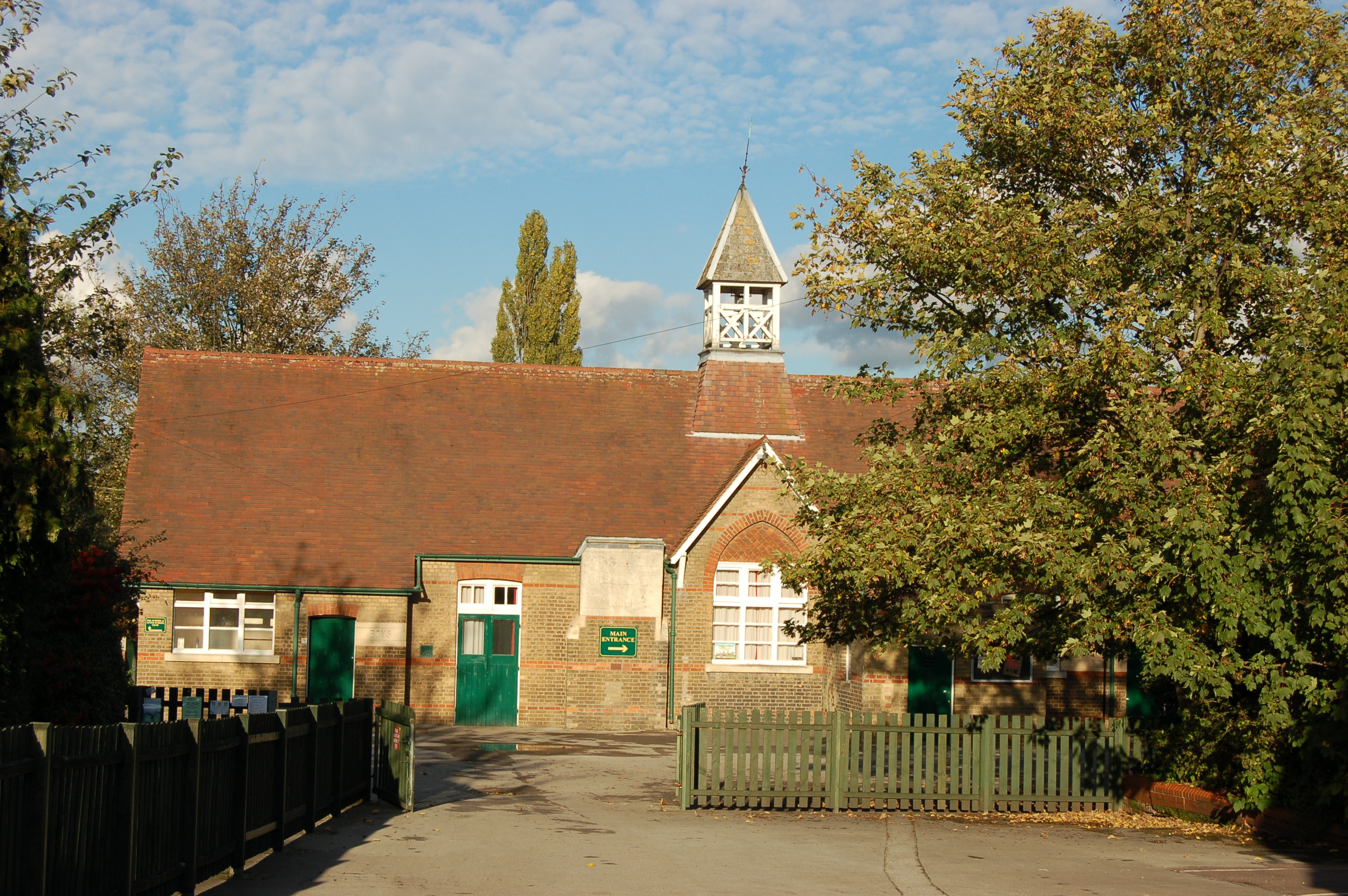
Sharnbrook Primary (previously John Gibbard Lower School)

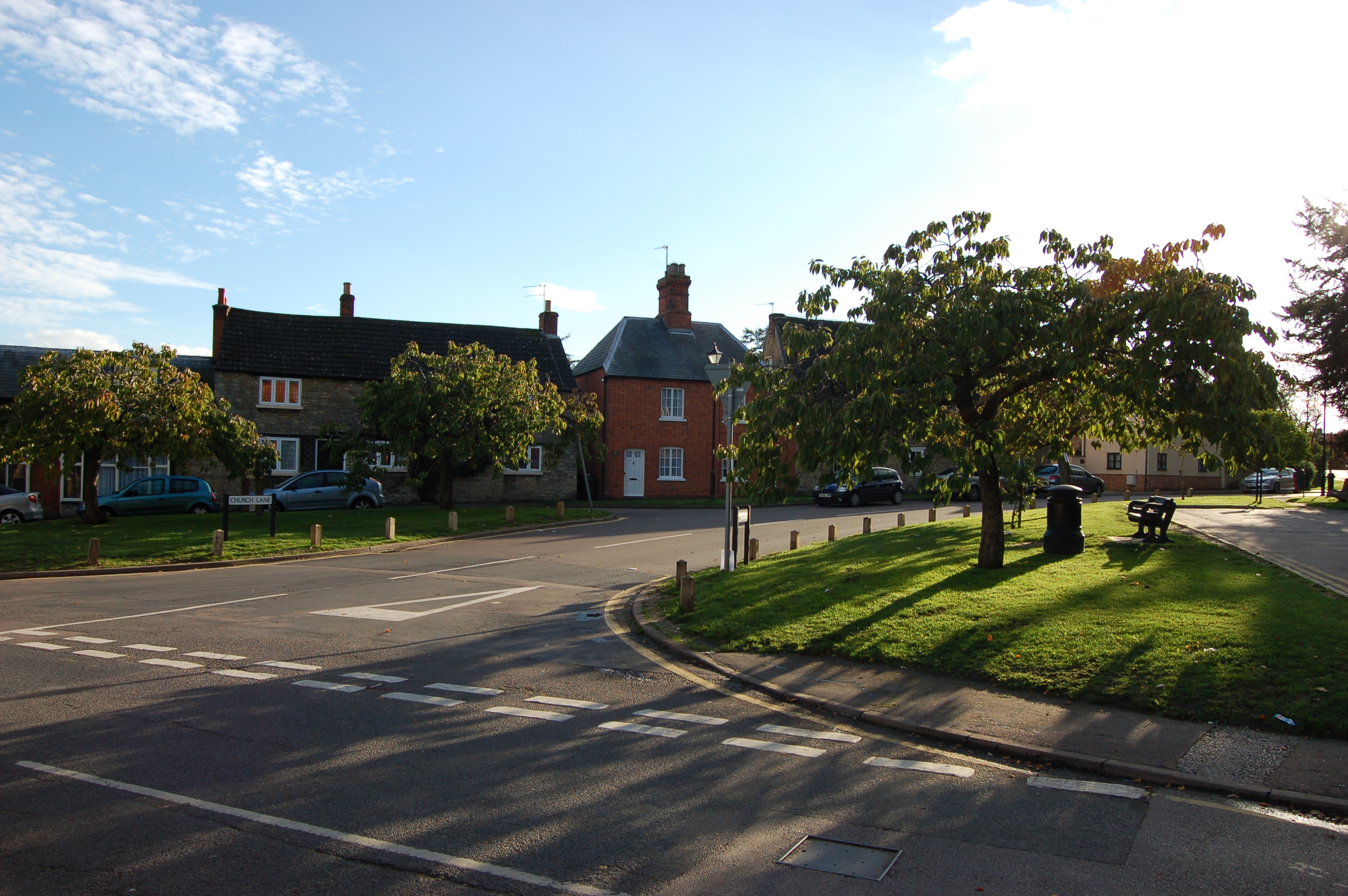
The High Street

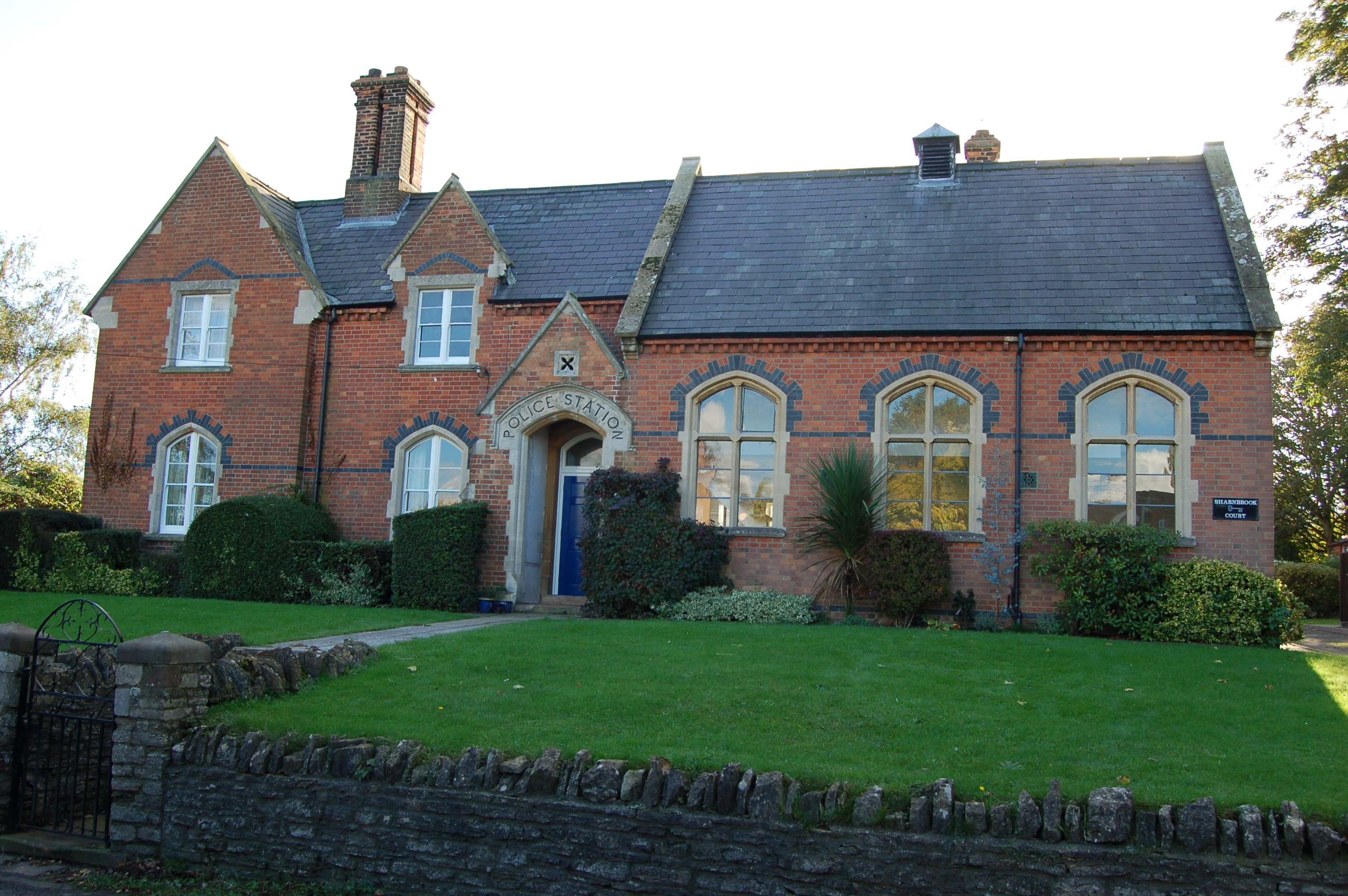
The Old Police Station

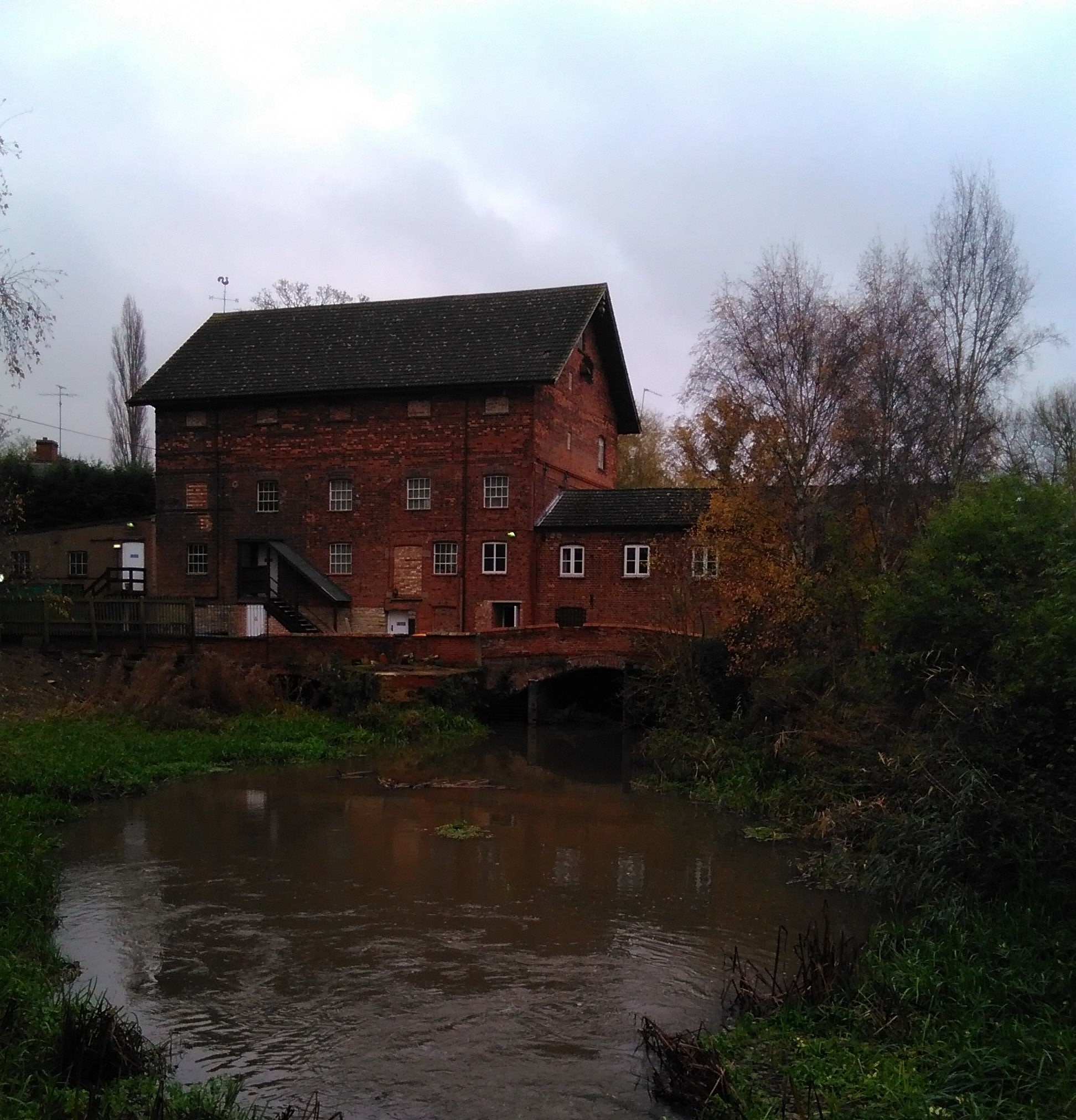
The Mill

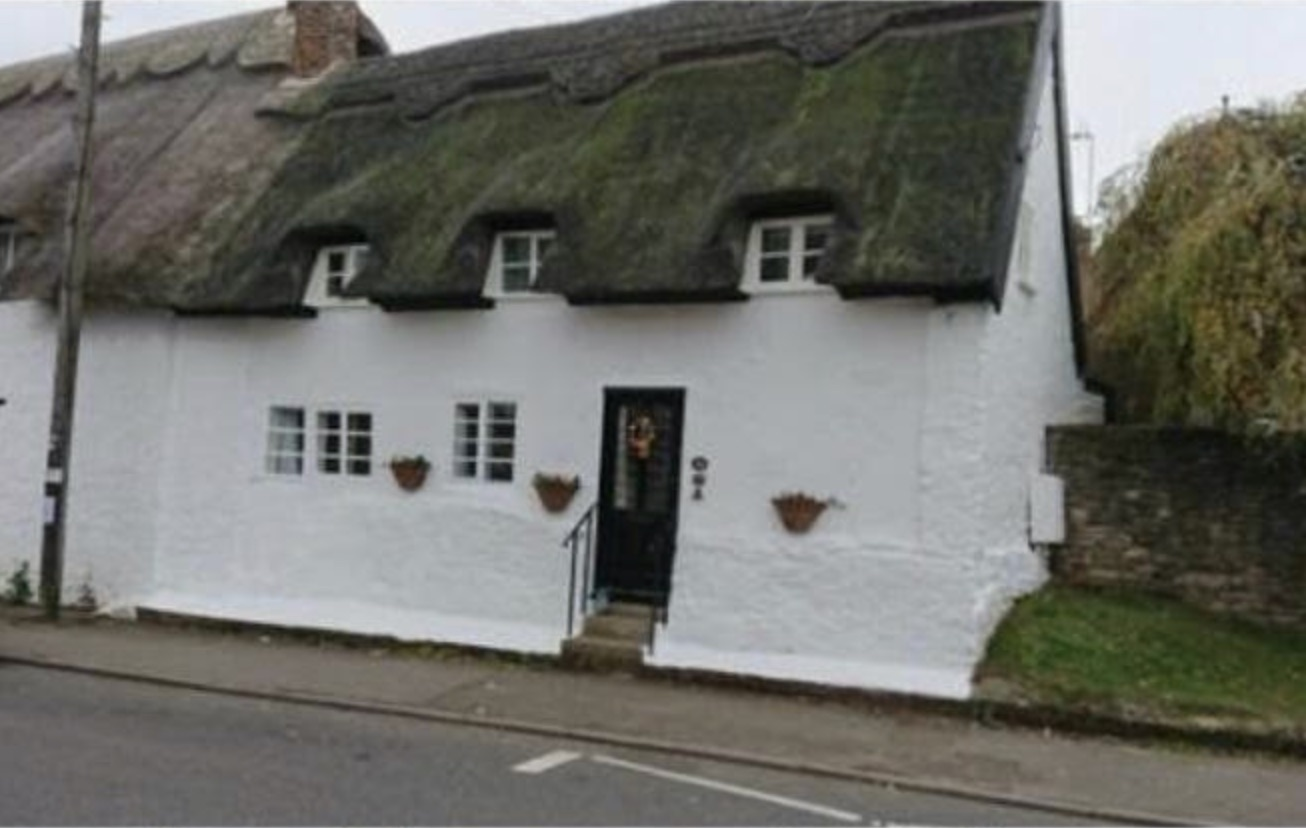
32 High Street, oolitic limestone, C18 or earlier
