= Odell, Bedfordshire =

Village in Bedfordshire, England

Coordinates: 52.2073°N 0.5898°W

Odell
- Location within Bedfordshire
- Population: 287 (2011 Census)
- OS grid reference: SP963575
- Unitary authority: Bedford
- Ceremonial county: Bedfordshire
- Region: East
- Country: England
- Sovereign state: United Kingdom
- Post town: BEDFORD
- Postcode district: MK43
- Dialling code: 01234
- Police: Bedfordshire
- Fire: Bedfordshire
- Ambulance: East of England
- UK Parliament: North Bedfordshire

Odell is a small village and civil parish in the Borough of Bedford, north Bedfordshire, England, approximately 7 miles (11 km) north-west of Bedford town centre, near the villages of Harrold, Felmersham, Sharnbrook and Carlton.

== History ==
=== Roman and Saxon period ===
Evidence of occupation includes the remains of a farm dating from just before the Roman invasion. It comprised two round timber buildings inside a fenced enclosure, and two cremation pits. After the conquest its survival and prosperity may have been linked to there being a Roman presence at Irchester.

The evidence is that the farm was abandoned in the 4th century and remained unoccupied until the 6th or 7th century. After this it no doubt experienced a chequered history owing to attacks by Danish Vikings.

In the early 11th century the area where the present village lies was part of five or more hides that were under Levenot, a thane of King Edward the Confessor, who owned much land.

At that time the village was already known by the name of Wadelle, or Wadehelle. This name means "the hill where woad grows". Woad (Isatis tinctoria) was important as a source of indigo blue textile dye.

=== Wahul history 1066–1633 ===
After the Battle of Hastings in 1066, William the Conqueror and his Normans progressively took control of the whole of England. In many cases regions were given to fellow soldiers to manage. The lands owned by Levenot, along with the title of baron, were passed to a Walter Flandrensis, the Count of Flanders, who is thought to have fought alongside William.

Walter is mentioned as early as 1068, and sometimes as Walter de Wahul (Wahul being a variant of Wadehelle). His arrival marked the start of a period of centuries during which a family bearing an Odell-type name continued to hold most of these lands.

Odell was recorded in the Domesday Book of 1086 as a parish of the Hundred of Willey.

Amongst the de Wahul dynasty were a number of interesting characters. The wild Simon de Wahul was described by the Archbishop of Canterbury as an "invader" of Ramsey Abbey. It is also known that Simon sided with Prince Henry in 1172 when Henry rebelled against his father. On the other hand, Simon's own son, another Simon, was very devout. He ended up dying in 1191 on a crusade.

In 1542, in the absence of a male heir, the estate came to 17-day-old Agnes Woodhall (like Wodelle this is another variant of the name). She married twice and her son by Richard Chetwood, also called Richard, became the heir to the estate on her death in 1575.

About this time the village often becomes referred to as Odell.

In 1613 Richard made efforts to be recognised as Baron of Odell (a claim his 18th-century great-great-grandson and 19th-century descendant also later pursued) but without success. In 1633, Richard sold the estate to William Alston and, after five hundred years, Odell village was no longer under the influence of a descendant of the family bearing the same name.

=== Church history ===
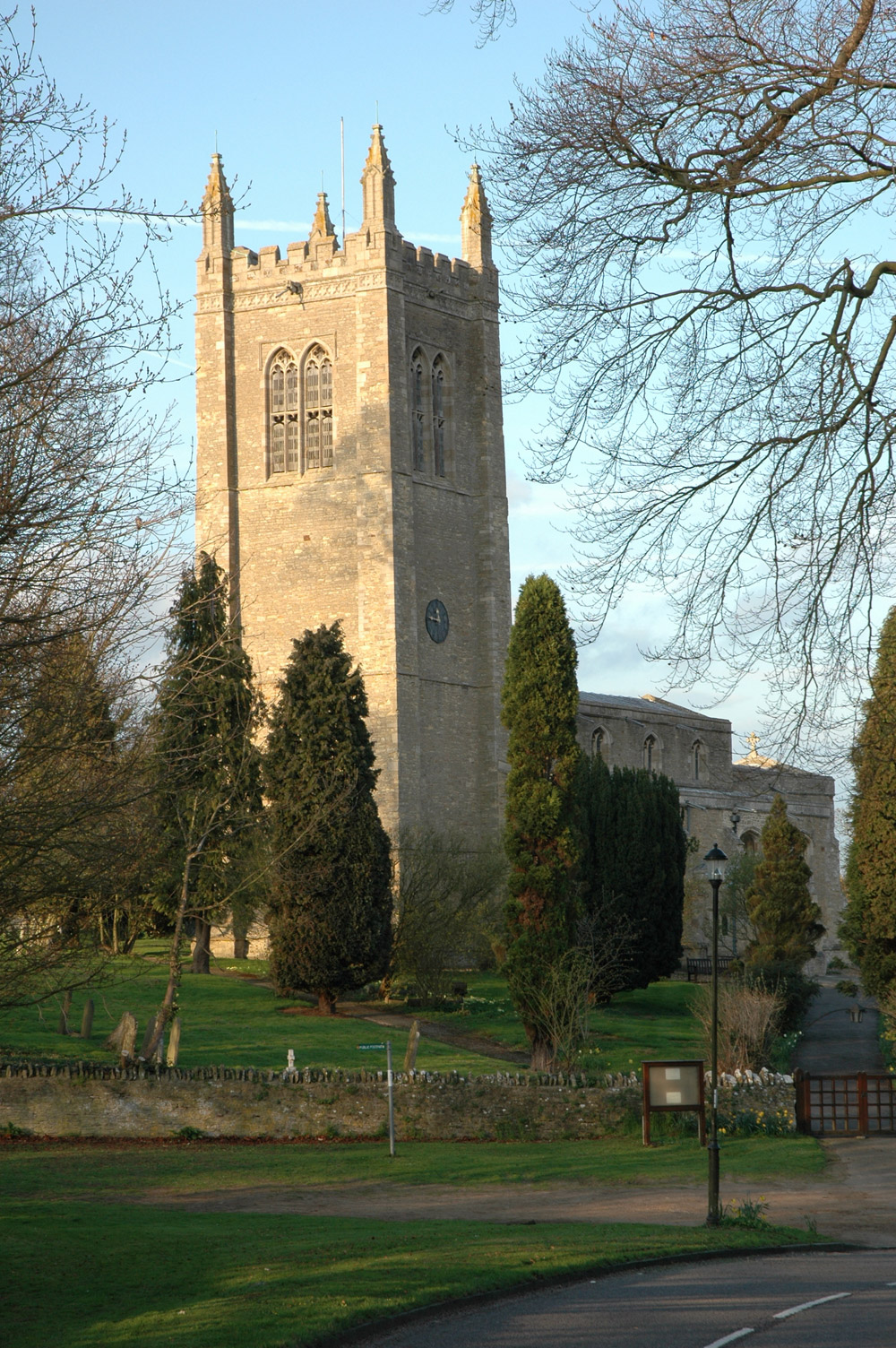
All Saints' Church

There is evidence that there was a church building in Odell village from as early as 1220, when Robert of Dunton is recorded as minister. A coffin lid also survives from this century. The present All Saints, however, dates from the 15th century. Built of limestone from Northamptonshire, it is a little atypical of Bedfordshire churches. In the late 17th century the building was greatly improved and in 1820 a clock was put in the tower. Further improvements were made in 1868, and in 1958 a sixth bell was added to the ring.

One of the more famous ministers at All Saints was Peter Bulkeley. Born in Odell in 1582, he became its rector in 1624, but since he did not "conform" to the requirements of the establishment, was suspended. In May 1635, like many other Nonconformists of the time, he emigrated to New England on the Susan and Ellen. On arrival he moved on to found the town of Concord, Massachusetts, becoming its first minister.

Between 1975 and 1981, All Saints' Church and Odell Castle played host to the Greenbelt Festival, attended by up to 15,000 people.

A park bench on the village green, outside the pub and against the wall of the castle, was given to the village by the organisers in 1979.

Odell was one of the first villages in England to have its own website with its parish magazine uploaded every month. This continues today on odellbeds.net the village's website.

=== The village: 18th century to today ===
Notable events include:

- 1717: The Bishop of Lincoln counted 66 families on a visit.
- 1771: An epidemic of smallpox occurred in which 12 people died.
- 1776: The area was enclosed by Act of Parliament.
- 1801: The population was 361.
- 1851: The census listed 22 Odells.
- 1863: Reverend Searle persuaded newlyweds George and Sarah Odell to emigrate to New Zealand
- 1931: The population was 226.
- 1982: The village welcomed folk from Concord, Massachusetts, as part of their 350-year celebrations.

== Today ==
Over recent years All Saints has become a place visited by those people round the world who seek to trace their ancestry to Odell, and to spend some time in the church or churchyard. Many of these visits are recorded in the church's visitors' book.

While there is still a hill at Odell (with a wood on it), there is little woad to be found; the plant is not as common in England as it once was. Commercially produced indigo has replaced woad as a dye (although seeds of woad can still be obtained). Odell Great Wood is located near the centre of the parish.

During the 1970s, several gravel pits between Odell and nearby Harrold were flooded with water from the nearby Great Ouse. In the early 1980s, the area was turned into Harrold-Odell Country Park. A wide variety of native waterfowl and other birds are seen on or near the lakes, including great crested grebes, moorhens, Canada geese, herons, swans, cormorants and a wide variety of ducks, as well as aquatic insects such as damselflies and dragonflies.

== Pronunciation ==
Most people pronounce the village's name as "oh-DEL", like the surname. Some commentators, however, consider it should be pronounced "OH-dl", rhyming with Yodel.
