= Harrold, Bedfordshire =

Village and civil parish in England

Coordinates: 52.2°N 0.61°W

Harrold
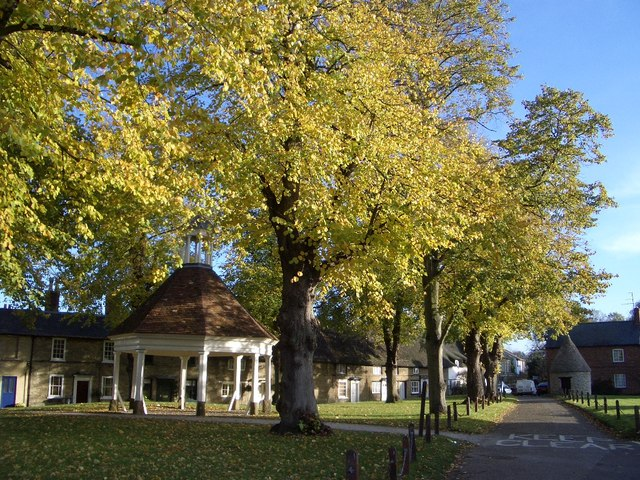
- Village green

- Location within Bedfordshire
- Population: 1,667 (2021 census)
- OS grid reference: SP950567
- Unitary authority: Bedford
- Ceremonial county: Bedfordshire
- Region: East
- Country: England
- Sovereign state: United Kingdom
- Post town: Bedford
- Postcode district: MK43
- Dialling code: 01234
- Police: Bedfordshire
- Fire: Bedfordshire
- Ambulance: East of England
- UK Parliament: North Bedfordshire

Harrold is a village, civil parish and electoral ward in Bedfordshire, England, nine miles north-west of Bedford on the north bank of the River Great Ouse, close to the county boundaries of Buckinghamshire and Northamptonshire. An ancient bridge links the village with Carlton with Chellington on the south bank. Immediately to the east of the village is Odell.

The Church of St Peter is in the village.

== History ==
Harrold was recorded in the Domesday Book of 1086 as a parish within the Hundred of Willey.

An early medieval sword mount was unearthed by a metal detectorist in 2006. It is believed the tiny phallic decoration could have adorned the sword belt of a high-ranking Saxon warrior.

There are two public houses in Harrold. The Muntjac and the Oakley Arms. Paul McCartney reputedly gave the first live performance of "Hey Jude" in the Oakley Arms in Harrold on 30 June 1968.

The village was struck by an F1/T2 tornado on 23 November 1981, as part of the record-breaking nationwide tornado outbreak on that day.

== Culture and Community ==
The Harrold Pit Run is a village fair on Harrold Village Green held every April since the 1980's, with a 3-mile run via Harrold-Odell Country Park (established from former gravel pits). There are also shorter races for children.

== Demographics ==
Census population of Harrold civil parish
Census	Population	Female	Male	Households	Source
2001	1,235	626	609	544	
2011	1,691	874	817	706	
2021	1,667	848	819	731	

== Electoral ward ==
Today an electoral ward within the Borough of Bedford, it contains four civil parishes within its boundaries. Civil parishes and settlements within the ward (from south to north) are Harrold CP, Odell parish, Podington CP including Hinwick and Farndish, and Wymington CP including Little Wymington. Harrold itself is near the southern boundary of its ward which follows some of the River Great Ouse. The ward extends northward from Harrold and fills the northwest corner of Bedfordshire, bordering Northamptonshire.

== Twin towns ==
- (France) Sainte-Pazanne, Loire-Atlantique

== Notable people ==
- W. T. Godber (1904–1981), English agriculturalist; worked in Harrold.
- George Le Fevre (1848–1891), surgeon and politician in colonial Australia; born in Harrold.
- Leslie Prentice (1886–1928), Australian-born English cricketer; died in Harrold.
- Ashley Walker (1844–1927), English amateur cricketer; died in Harrold.

== Gallery ==
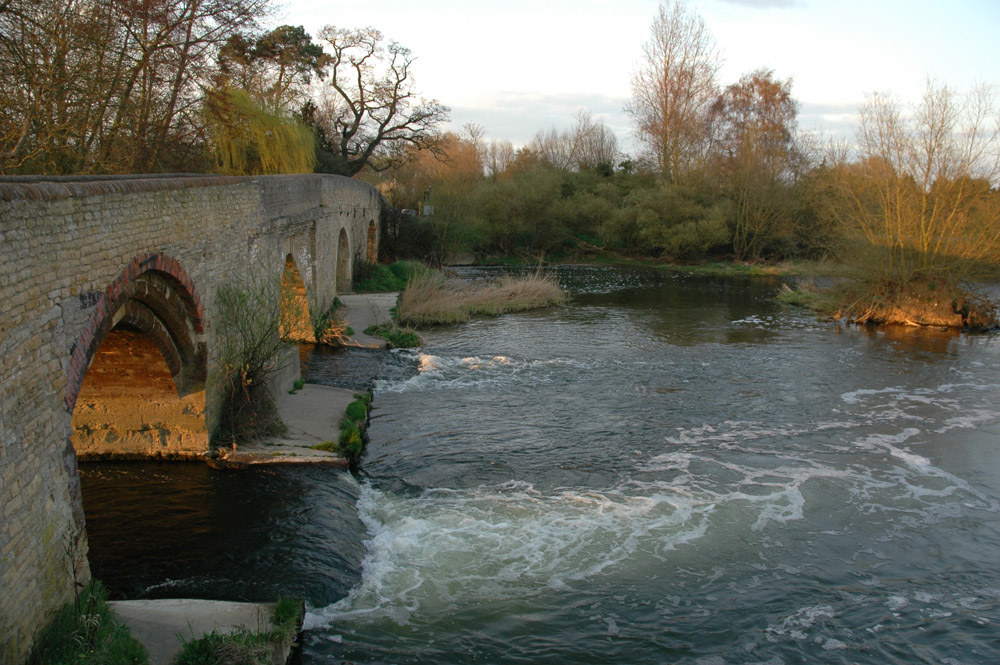
The bridge at Harrold

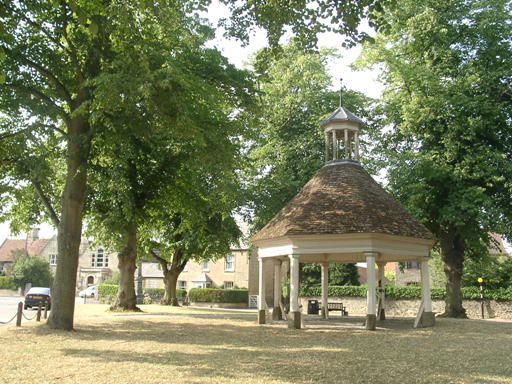
Harrold Buttermarket

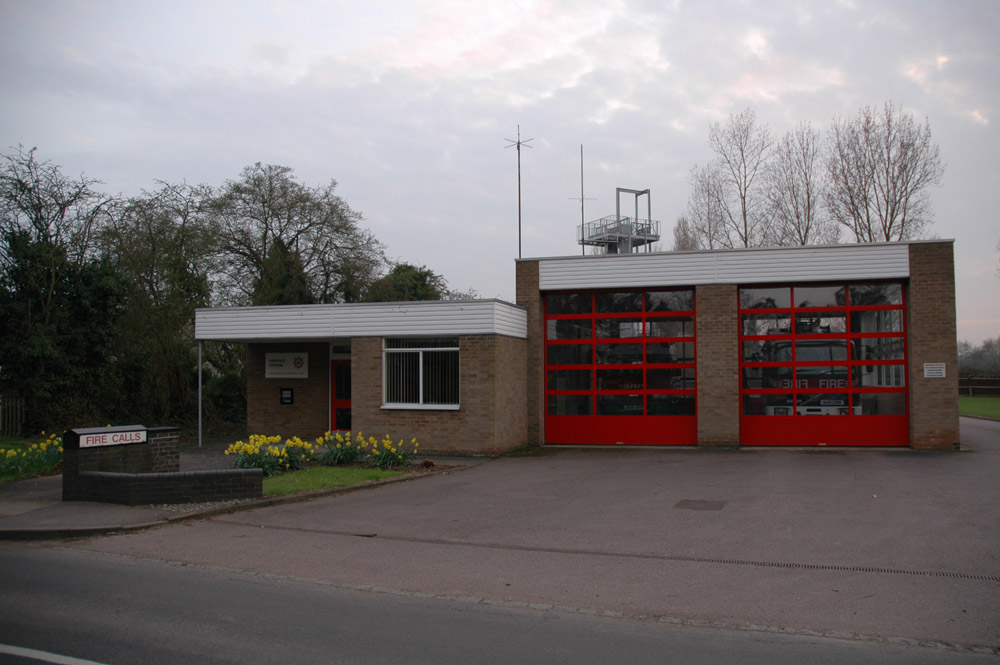
Harrold Fire Station

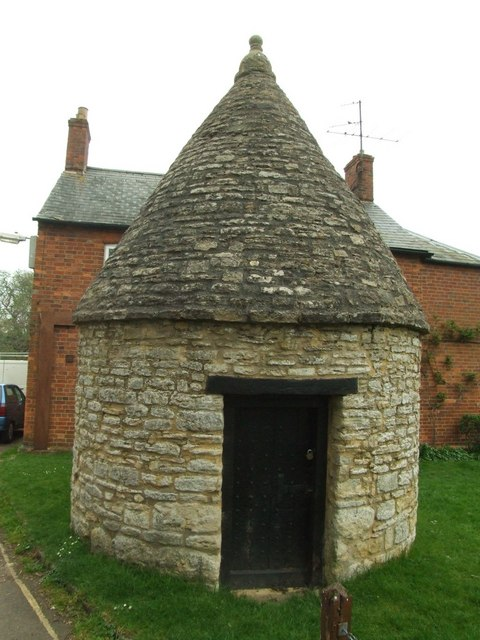
Harrold lock-up

== Freedom of the Parish ==
Jason Chandler, the village's long-serving postman, was awarded honorary Freedom of the Parish of Harrold in April 2023.

== See also ==
- Harrold Hall
- Harrold-Odell_Country_Park
- Harrold Calvados Society
