= Grade II* listed buildings in Bedfordshire =

Bedfordshire shown within England

There are over 20,000 Grade II* listed buildings in England. This page is a list of these buildings in the county of Bedfordshire by district.

== Bedford ==
Name	Location	Type	Completed (Note: The date given is the date used by Historic England as significant for the initial building or that of an important part in the structure's description.)	Date designated	Grid ref. (Note: The grid reference is based on the British national grid reference system, sometimes known as OSGB36, used by the Ordnance Survey.) Geo-coordinates	Entry number (Note: The "List Entry Number" is a unique number assigned to each listed building and scheduled monument by Historic England.)	Image
Bletsoe Castle	Bletsoe	Country house	Late 16th century	7 May 1952	TL0248958411; 52°12′52″N 0°30′05″W	1114219	Bletsoe Castle More images
Church of St Mary the Virgin	Bletsoe	Parish church	Probably late 13th century	13 July 1964	TL0234158330; 52°12′49″N 0°30′13″W	1158715	Church of St Mary the Virgin More images
Church of St Dunsten	Bolnhurst, Bolnhurst and Keysoe	Parish church	13th century	13 July 1964	TL0807658689; 52°12′57″N 0°25′10″W	1114777	Church of St Dunsten More images
Bromham Hall	Bromham Park, Bromham	House	Early 17th century	7 May 1952	TL0168651226; 52°09′00″N 0°30′55″W	1158818	Upload Photo
Howard's House	Cardington	House	18th century	7 May 1952	TL0864047985; 52°07′10″N 0°24′53″W	1114147	Howard's House
Low Farmhouse	Colmworth	Farmhouse	Early 17th century or earlier	18 August 1983	TL1008856680; 52°11′51″N 0°23′27″W	1114876	Low Farmhouse
Cardington Number 1 Shed at RAF Cardington	Eastcotts	Airship hangar	1916–17	29 January 1982	TL0807946833; 52°06′33″N 0°25′24″W	1114165	Cardington Number 1 Shed at RAF Cardington More images
Cardington Number 2 Shed at RAF Cardington	Eastcotts	Airship hangar	1928	29 January 1982	TL0818346760; 52°06′31″N 0°25′18″W	1136810	Cardington Number 2 Shed at RAF Cardington More images
Manor Farmhouse	Cotton End, Eastcotts	Farmhouse	Late 16th century	17 May 1984	TL0847445585; 52°05′53″N 0°25′04″W	1114166	Upload Photo
Bunyan's Mead	Elstow	House	16th century	13 July 1964	TL0498647531; 52°06′58″N 0°28′05″W	1136945	Bunyan's Mead
Moot Hall	Elstow	Moot hall	c. 1500	13 July 1964	TL0492947518; 52°06′58″N 0°28′08″W	1136906	Moot Hall More images
Parish church of All Saints	Great Barford	Parish church	15th century	13 July 1964	TL1339851706; 52°09′07″N 0°20′38″W	1137682	Parish church of All Saints More images
The Old Manor	Harrold	House	Late 16th or early 17th century	13 July 1964	SP9532056821; 52°12′05″N 0°36′24″W	1159476	Upload Photo
Box End House	Kempston Rural	House	17th or early 18th century	8 September 1977	TL0106648556; 52°07′34″N 0°31′30″W	1159567	Upload Photo
Church of All Saints	Souldrop, Knotting and Souldrop	Church	Late 13th century	13 July 1964	SP9852361543; 52°14′36″N 0°33′30″W	1159751	Church of All Saints More images
Parish church of St Denys	Little Barford	Parish church	Late 12th century Norman	13 July 1964	TL1775156953; 52°11′54″N 0°16′43″W	1114892	Parish church of St Denys More images
Melchbourne House	Melchbourne, Melchbourne and Yielden	Country house	1741	13 July 1964	TL0301465313; 52°16′35″N 0°29′30″W	1114819	Melchbourne House More images
Oakley House	Oakley	House	c. 1795	7 May 1952	TL0046053229; 52°10′05″N 0°31′57″W	1321524	Upload Photo
Harrold Bridge	Odell	Bridge	Mid-14th century	13 July 1964	SP9555756542; 52°11′56″N 0°36′12″W	1321535	Harrold Bridge More images
The Old Rectory	Pertenhall	House	Late 18th century	7 May 1952	TL0847265416; 52°16′34″N 0°24′42″W	1114828	Upload Photo
Garden entrance gates, Hinwick Hall	Hinwick, Podington	Gate	18th century	13 July 1964	SP9348562336; 52°15′05″N 0°37′55″W	1114353	Garden entrance gates, Hinwick Hall
Hinwick Hall	Hinwick, Podington	Country house	16th century	7 May 1952	SP9345462360; 52°15′05″N 0°37′57″W	1310545	Hinwick Hall More images
Congregational Chapel	Roxton	Chapel	1808	13 July 1964	TL1518654442; 52°10′34″N 0°19′01″W	1146376	Congregational Chapel More images
Parish church of St Mary Magdalen	Roxton	Parish church	14th century	13 July 1964	TL1534554520; 52°10′37″N 0°18′52″W	1114927	Parish church of St Mary Magdalen More images
Colworth House	Colworth Estate, Sharnbrook	Country house	1714–20	7 May 1952	SP9810060108; 52°13′50″N 0°33′54″W	1160878	Colworth House More images
Basmead Manor Farmhouse	Staploe	Farmhouse	1973–74	7 May 1952	TL1396861195; 52°14′14″N 0°19′57″W	1321617	Upload Photo
Stevington Windmill	Stevington	Post mill	1770	7 May 1952	SP9919452760; 52°09′51″N 0°33′04″W	1310161	Stevington Windmill More images
Village Cross	Stevington	Village cross	14th century	13 July 1964	SP9894553247; 52°10′07″N 0°33′17″W	1310180	Village Cross More images
Churchyard cross near south door of church	Thurleigh	Cross	15th century	18 August 1983	TL0514158450; 52°12′51″N 0°27′45″W	1114123	Upload Photo
Parish church of St Peter	Thurleigh	Parish church	Norman	13 July 1964	TL0513558466; 52°12′52″N 0°27′45″W	1311731	Parish church of St Peter More images
Parish church of All Saints	Wilshamstead	Parish church	14th century	13 July 1964	TL0626743486; 52°04′46″N 0°27′03″W	1321582	Parish church of All Saints More images
Wootton House	Wootton	Country house	Late 17th century	7 May 1952	TL0023845046; 52°05′41″N 0°32′18″W	1249255	Upload Photo
Bedford Modern School	Bedford	School	1831–34	6 June 1952	TL0489649763; 52°08′10″N 0°28′08″W	1138232	Bedford Modern School More images
Bedford School Chapel	Bedford	School	1907–08	14 May 1971	TL0533650508; 52°08′34″N 0°27′44″W	1321037	Bedford School Chapel More images
Church of St Mary the Virgin	Goldington	Church	13th century	6 June 1952	TL0762751011; 52°08′49″N 0°25′43″W	1321043	Church of St Mary the Virgin More images
Harpur Suite	Bedford	Public library	1834	6 June 1952	TL0494649757; 52°08′10″N 0°28′05″W	1129009	Harpur Suite More images
House on north side of St Mary's Square	Bedford	House	c. 1707	6 June 1952	TL0508749401; 52°07′59″N 0°27′58″W	1129024	House on north side of St Mary's Square More images
North-west block of Bedford Modern School	Bedford	School	1831–34	7 November 1969	TL0484749798; 52°08′12″N 0°28′10″W	1129010	Upload Photo
St John's Hospital	Bedford	Hospital	13th century	14 May 1971	TL0517049228; 52°07′53″N 0°27′54″W	1321010	Upload Photo
St Mary's House	Bedford	House	c. 1707	6 June 1952	TL0524949368; 52°07′57″N 0°27′50″W	1128998	St Mary's House
The Swan Hotel	Bedford	Hotel		6 June 1952	TL0513749631; 52°08′06″N 0°27′55″W	1311924	The Swan Hotel More images
Bedfordshire and Hertfordshire Regimental War Memorial	Kempston	War memorial	1921	17 May 1984	TL0393148470; 52°07′29″N 0°29′00″W	1114178	Bedfordshire and Hertfordshire Regimental War Memorial More images

== Central Bedfordshire ==
Name	Location	Type	Completed	Date designated	Grid ref. Geo-coordinates	Entry number	Image
Avenue House	Ampthill	House	1775	17 July 1951	TL0355238180; 52°01′57″N 0°29′31″W	1114436	Upload Photo
Dynevor House	Ampthill	Country house	1725	17 July 1951	TL0368438229; 52°01′58″N 0°29′24″W	1137916	Upload Photo
Ampthill Park House	Ampthill	Country house	1694	17 July 1951	TL0267039058; 52°02′26″N 0°30′16″W	1137595	Ampthill Park House More images
37 Church Street	Ampthill	House	Early 18th century	17 July 1951	TL0364438178; 52°01′56″N 0°29′26″W	1321441	Upload Photo
Aspley House	Aspley Guise	Country house	Pre-1749	22 October 1952	SP9436836094; 52°00′55″N 0°37′35″W	1113948	Upload Photo
Church of St Botolph	Aspley Guise	Parish church	Medieval	23 January 1961	SP9424936248; 52°01′00″N 0°37′41″W	1312070	Church of St Botolph More images
Guise House	Aspley Guise	Country house	Early 18th century	23 January 1961	SP9428636077; 52°00′54″N 0°37′39″W	1113952	Upload Photo
The Old House	Aspley Guise	House	Early 19th century	22 October 1952	SP9440036218; 52°00′59″N 0°37′33″W	1113954	Upload Photo
Church of St Michael	Aspley Heath	Parish church	1868	1 March 1972	SP9285835343; 52°00′32″N 0°38′55″W	1312016	Church of St Michael More images
Church of St Guthlac	Astwick	Parish church	15th century	31 October 1966	TL2134938566; 52°01′56″N 0°13′57″W	1113827	Church of St Guthlac More images
Church of St Andrew	Biggleswade	Parish church	14th century	20 May 1952	TL1880144602; 52°05′13″N 0°16′03″W	1321424	Church of St Andrew More images
Church of All Saints	Caddington	Church	Late 12th century	3 February 1967	TL0639819847; 51°52′01″N 0°27′22″W	1321349	Church of All Saints More images
Campton Manor	Campton, Campton and Chicksands	House	18th century	16 January 1952	TL1290537988; 52°01′44″N 0°21′21″W	1137564	Upload Photo
Orangery approximately 100 metres north-east of Chicksands Priory	Chicksands, Campton and Chicksands	Orangery	c. 1800	11 October 1973	TL1217939414; 52°02′30″N 0°21′57″W	1113727	Upload Photo
Church of All Saints	Campton, Campton and Chicksands	Parish church	Late 13th century	31 October 1966	TL1299138069; 52°01′46″N 0°21′16″W	1113722	Church of All Saints More images
Church of All Saints	Clifton	Parish church	Early 14th century	31 October 1966	TL1658939249; 52°02′22″N 0°18′06″W	1321771	Church of All Saints More images
Church of St Mary the Virgin	Clophill	Church	14th and 15th century	23 January 1961	TL0918938852; 52°02′14″N 0°24′34″W	1113735	Church of St Mary the Virgin More images
Chew's House	Dunstable	House	c. 1715	25 October 1951	TL0213221654; 51°53′03″N 0°31′03″W	1114595	Upload Photo
Marshe Almshouses	Dunstable	Almshouse	c. 1743	25 October 1951	TL0218821986; 51°53′13″N 0°31′00″W	1114583	Marshe Almshouses More images
Priory House (Council Offices)	Dunstable	House	18th century	25 October 1951	TL0198721774; 51°53′07″N 0°31′11″W	1114593	Upload Photo
13 High Street North	Dunstable	Gatehouse	Early 17th century	4 March 1976	TL0182821903; 51°53′11″N 0°31′19″W	1114592	Upload Photo
Church of St Mary	Dunton	Church	14th and 15th century	31 October 1966	TL2373944224; 52°04′57″N 0°11′44″W	1114060	Church of St Mary More images
Doolittle Mill	Eaton Bray	House	18th century	26 September 1980	SP9901320179; 51°52′17″N 0°33′48″W	1321286	Doolittle Mill More images
Church of St Michael	Eggington	Church	Early 14th century	3 February 1967	SP9567925171; 51°55′01″N 0°36′37″W	1158463	Church of St Michael More images
Eggington House	Eggington	House	c. 1696	29 April 1952	SP9604925356; 51°55′06″N 0°36′17″W	1114682	Eggington House More images
Church of St John the Baptist	Church End, Eversholt	Parish church	12th century	23 January 1961	SP9829632505; 51°58′56″N 0°34′13″W	1138155	Church of St John the Baptist More images
Tyrells End Farmhouse	Tyrells End, Eversholt	House	15th century	16 March 1987	SP9821032911; 51°59′10″N 0°34′17″W	1311955	Upload Photo
Flitwick Manor	Flitwick	House	Earlier 17th century	22 October 1952	TL0291534173; 51°59′47″N 0°30′09″W	1137690	Flitwick Manor More images
Parish church of St Giles	Upper Gravenhurst, Gravenhurst	Parish church	12th century	23 January 1961	TL1130535987; 52°00′40″N 0°22′47″W	1113746	Parish church of St Giles More images
Church of St Michael and All Angels	Great Billington	Church	13th century	3 February 1967	SP9404522557; 51°53′37″N 0°38′05″W	1311613	Church of St Michael and All Angels More images
Harlington Manor	Harlington	House	Late 14th century	22 October 1952	TL0365330451; 51°57′46″N 0°29′34″W	1137774	Harlington Manor More images
Church of St Mary the Virgin	Church End, Haynes	Parish church	14th century	23 January 1961	TL0810941190; 52°03′31″N 0°25′28″W	1311867	Church of St Mary the Virgin More images
Heath Manor	Heath and Reach	Manor house	Late 16th or early 17th century	29 April 1952	SP9252627698; 51°56′24″N 0°39′20″W	1114690	Upload Photo
Henlow Grange	Henlow	Country house	Mid-18th century	16 January 1952	TL1838938381; 52°01′52″N 0°16′32″W	1113835	Henlow Grange More images
Church of St Nicholas	Church End, Hockliffe	Church	14th century	3 February 1967	SP9660826968; 51°55′58″N 0°35′47″W	1114693	Church of St Nicholas More images
17th-century range of outbuildings to north-west of Houghton Hall	Houghton Regis	Outbuilding	17th century	26 September 1980	TL0217023710; 51°54′09″N 0°30′59″W	1114706	Upload Photo
Houghton Hall	Houghton Regis	House	Late 17th century	29 April 1952	TL0219723695; 51°54′09″N 0°30′58″W	1321335	Houghton Hall More images
Crawley House	Crawley Park, Husborne Crawley	Country house	1777–78	22 October 1952	SP9533036002; 52°00′51″N 0°36′44″W	1321680	Upload Photo
Parish church of St James	Husborne Crawley	Parish church	13th century	23 January 1961	SP9556536227; 52°00′58″N 0°36′32″W	1321642	Parish church of St James More images
Hyde Mill (including attached granary and store)	Hyde	Corn mill	Late 19th century	22 June 1998	TL1324916995; 51°50′24″N 0°21′27″W	1119785	Hyde Mill (including attached granary and store)
Luton Hoo Stables, including frontage range and rear courtyard buildings, incorporating stablemaster's house	Luton Hoo Estate, Hyde	House	Early 19th century	3 February 1967	TL1046218212; 51°51′06″N 0°23′52″W	1114713	Upload Photo
The Hyde	East Hyde Park, Hyde	House	18th century	3 February 1967	TL1356017649; 51°50′45″N 0°21′10″W	1158916	Upload Photo
Lynch House	Kensworth Lynch, Kensworth	House	18th century	3 February 1967	TL0441518155; 51°51′08″N 0°29′08″W	1114724	Lynch House
Library at the Cedars School	Leighton Buzzard	Clergy house	Early 18th century	27 May 1954	SP9184024962; 51°54′56″N 0°39′58″W	1321402	Upload Photo
Market Cross	Leighton Buzzard	Market cross	15th century	27 May 1954	SP9214025060; 51°54′59″N 0°39′42″W	1321381	Market Cross More images
Moat Farmhouse (now Morteyne Manor)	Marston Moretaine	Farmhouse	Early 16th century	22 October 1952	SP9931041330; 52°03′41″N 0°33′10″W	1114050	Moat Farmhouse (now Morteyne Manor) More images
Church of St Mary the Virgin	Maulden	Parish church	14th century	23 January 1961	TL0584138054; 52°01′51″N 0°27′31″W	1321701	Church of St Mary the Virgin More images
Church of St Mary the Virgin	Meppershall	Parish church	12th century	31 October 1966	TL1345935925; 52°00′37″N 0°20′54″W	1312589	Church of St Mary the Virgin More images
St Thomas' Chapel approximately 20 metres south of Chapel Farmhouse	Meppershall	Chapel	c. 1175	31 October 1966	TL1471536215; 52°00′45″N 0°19′48″W	1113845	Upload Photo
Church of St Michael	Millbrook	Parish church	13th century	23 January 1961	TL0136238528; 52°02′09″N 0°31′25″W	1113934	Church of St Michael More images
London Lodge, gateway and walls	Milton Bryan	Gate lodge	1805–10	23 January 1961	SP9633330890; 51°58′05″N 0°35′57″W	1311905	London Lodge, gateway and walls More images
Former principal stable block of Moggerhanger House	Mogerhanger	Stable	1790–92	6 March 1985	TL1351348640; 52°07′28″N 0°20′36″W	1113882	Former principal stable block of Moggerhanger House
Dovecote at Ickwell Bury	Ickwell, Northill	Dovecote	1680s	31 October 1966	TL1458145657; 52°05′51″N 0°19′43″W	1321726	Upload Photo
Barns at Warden Abbey Farm	Old Warden	Barn	Late 16th century	16 March 1972	TL1195843926; 52°04′57″N 0°22′03″W	1274805	Upload Photo
Bridge between Upper and Middle Ponds	The Swiss Garden, Old Warden	Swiss garden	Late 19th century	11 October 1973	TL1498244757; 52°05′21″N 0°19′23″W	1222503	Bridge between Upper and Middle Ponds More images
The Grotto and Fernery	The Swiss Garden, Old Warden	Grotto	Early 1830s	11 October 1973	TL1492144703; 52°05′20″N 0°19′27″W	1222502	Upload Photo
Moat bridge south of Middle Pond	The Swiss Garden, Old Warden	Swiss garden	Early 19th century	11 October 1973	TL1496044756; 52°05′21″N 0°19′25″W	1274616	Moat bridge south of Middle Pond
Old Warden Park (Shuttleworth College)	Old Warden	House	Earlier	6 March 1985	TL1464444236; 52°05′05″N 0°19′42″W	1222169	Old Warden Park (Shuttleworth College) More images
The Indian Kiosk	The Swiss Garden, Old Warden	Garden house	Early 19th century	11 October 1973	TL1493944790; 52°05′22″N 0°19′26″W	1237794	The Indian Kiosk
The North Bridge north of Middle Pond	The Swiss Garden, Old Warden	Swiss garden	Early 19th century	11 October 1973	TL1496244804; 52°05′23″N 0°19′24″W	1222504	Upload Photo
The Swiss Cottage	The Swiss Garden, Old Warden	Garden house	1820s	11 October 1973	TL1491344653; 52°05′18″N 0°19′27″W	1237818	The Swiss Cottage More images
Church of St Mary the Virgin	Potsgrove	Parish church	14th century	22 October 1952	SP9515529851; 51°57′32″N 0°37′00″W	1321686	Church of St Mary the Virgin More images
Church of St James	Pulloxhill	Church	14th century	23 January 1961	TL0616233800; 51°59′33″N 0°27′19″W	1138002	Church of St James More images
Old Church of All Saints	Segenhoe, Ridgmont	Parish church	12th century	23 January 1961	SP9811935789; 52°00′43″N 0°34′18″W		Old Church of All Saints More images
Parish church of All Saints	Ridgmont	Parish church	1854–55	23 January 1961	SP9758736057; 52°00′52″N 0°34′46″W	1114055	Parish church of All Saints More images
Segenhoe Manor	Segenhoe, Ridgmont	House	Early 18th century	12 May 1993	SP9825935995; 52°00′49″N 0°34′11″W	1158084	Upload Photo
Church of St Swithun	Sandy	Church	Medieval	21 December 1979	TL1739349071; 52°07′39″N 0°17′11″W	1137790	Church of St Swithun More images
Hazells Hall	Sandy	Country house	1720s	29 May 1979	TL1892049999; 52°08′08″N 0°15′50″W	1137713	Upload Photo
Catholic Church of St Francis of Assisi	Shefford	Roman Catholic church	1884	10 January 1985	TL1426039011; 52°02′16″N 0°20′08″W	1113767	Catholic Church of St Francis of Assisi More images
Parish church of St Margaret	Higham Gobion, Shillington	Parish church	14th century	23 January 1961	TL1037832784; 51°58′57″N 0°23′39″W	1113758	Parish church of St Margaret More images
Bath house and cascade	Wrest Park, Silsoe	Bath house	c. 1769–71	10 January 1985	TL0888535350; 52°00′21″N 0°24′54″W	1113790	Bath house and cascade More images
Bowling Green House and two urns on pedestals 5 metres to the south-east and north-east	Wrest Park, Silsoe	Pavilion	c. 1735	10 January 1985	TL0896635110; 52°00′13″N 0°24′50″W	1158672	Bowling Green House and two urns on pedestals 5 metres to the south-east and north-east More images
Four statuary groups in the South Parterre (also known as the French Garden) south of Wrest House, depicting Aeneas and Anchises, the Abduction of Helen of Troy, Venus and Adonis and Meleager and Atalanta	Wrest Park, Silsoe	Statue	c. 1730	10 January 1985	TL0909535532; 52°00′27″N 0°24′43″W	1113789	Four statuary groups in the South Parterre (also known as the French Garden) south of Wrest House, depicting Aeneas and Anchises, the Abduction of Helen of Troy, Venus and Adonis and Meleager and Atalanta More images
Group of five altars approximately 50 metres south of Ladies Lake	Wrest Park, Silsoe	Altar	1st–2nd century BCE	10 January 1985	TL0930635022; 52°00′10″N 0°24′33″W	1311237	Upload Photo
Mithraic altar approximately 40 metres east of the Hutton Monument	Wrest Park, Silsoe	Garden ornament	1748	10 January 1985	TL0906734723; 52°00′01″N 0°24′46″W	1158808	Mithraic altar approximately 40 metres east of the Hutton Monument More images
Orangery, steps and four cherub statues on pedestals	Wrest Park, Silsoe	Orangery	c. 1835	10 January 1985	TL0896935360; 52°00′22″N 0°24′50″W	1158549	Orangery, steps and four cherub statues on pedestals More images
Statue of Lady Jemima, 27 metres south of the West Half House	Wrest Park, Silsoe	Statue	Erected c. 1748	10 January 1985	TL0903634879; 52°00′06″N 0°24′47″W	1113805	Statue of Lady Jemima, 27 metres south of the West Half House More images
Statue of William III 30 metres north of the Archer Pavilion	Wrest Park, Silsoe	Statue	1730s	10 January 1985	TL0918034782; 52°00′03″N 0°24′40″W	1158878	Statue of William III 30 metres north of the Archer Pavilion More images
Parish church of All Saints	Southill	Parish church	1814	31 October 1966	TL1458742231; 52°04′00″N 0°19′47″W	1274447	Parish church of All Saints More images
The Temple	Southill Park, Southill	Garden building	c. 1800	16 January 1952	TL1449143179; 52°04′31″N 0°19′51″W	1237890	Upload Photo
Church of St Mary the Virgin	Stotfold	Parish church	12th century	31 October 1966	TL2202936680; 52°00′54″N 0°13′24″W	1113866	Church of St Mary the Virgin More images
Packhorse Bridge	Sutton	Bridge	18th century	31 October 1966	TL2205847423; 52°06′42″N 0°13′08″W	1321630	Packhorse Bridge More images
Church of St Peter	Tempsford	Parish church	14th century	31 October 1966	TL1619253032; 52°09′48″N 0°18′10″W	1114096	Church of St Peter More images
Gatehouse to Manor Farm	Tilsworth	Gatehouse	15th century	29 April 1952	SP9761624201; 51°54′28″N 0°34′57″W	1114739	Gatehouse to Manor Farm
Church of St Mary Magdalen	Westoning	Parish church	12th century	23 January 1961	TL0281232792; 51°59′03″N 0°30′16″W	1138118	Church of St Mary Magdalen More images
Church of St Mary Magdalen	Whipsnade	Church	15th century	3 February 1967	TL0117217959; 51°51′04″N 0°31′57″W	1159770	Church of St Mary Magdalen More images
Elephant House	Whipsnade Zoo, Whipsnade	Elephant house	1935	1 September 1988	TL0031617319; 51°50′44″N 0°32′43″W	1235411	Elephant House More images
Holly Frindle Bungalow	Whipsnade Zoo, Whipsnade	Bungalow	1933–36	1 September 1988	TL0002516903; 51°50′30″N 0°32′58″W	1321291	Upload Photo
Atrium Antiques	Woburn	House	c. 1725	22 October 1952	SP9489233158; 51°59′20″N 0°37′10″W	1114002	Atrium Antiques More images
Chinese Pavilion, at centre of maze	Woburn Park, Woburn	Garden building	c. 1833	23 January 1961	SP9671132292; 51°58′50″N 0°35′36″W	1158303	Chinese Pavilion, at centre of maze More images
Church of St Mary	Woburn	Parish church	1865–68	1 March 1972	SP9504033273; 51°59′23″N 0°37′02″W	1321663	Church of St Mary More images
North gatepier of pair adjacent to Lion Lodge	Woburn Park, Woburn	Gate pier	Mid-18th century	23 January 1961	SP9517833297; 51°59′24″N 0°36′55″W	1321664	North gatepier of pair adjacent to Lion Lodge More images
Old Church of St Mary	Woburn	Parish church	1865–68	23 January 1961	SP9486633246; 51°59′22″N 0°37′12″W	1146524	Old Church of St Mary More images
South gatepier of pair adjacent to Lion Lodge	Woburn Park, Woburn	Gate pier	Mid-18th century	23 January 1961	SP9518233290; 51°59′24″N 0°36′55″W	1114005	South gatepier of pair adjacent to Lion Lodge More images
The Chestnuts	Woburn	House	Late 18th century	22 October 1952	SP9496433063; 51°59′16″N 0°37′07″W	1113991	Upload Photo
The Gifford Gallery/Woburn Fine Arts	Woburn	House	Early 18th century	22 October 1952	SP9493433194; 51°59′21″N 0°37′08″W	1157988	The Gifford Gallery/Woburn Fine Arts More images
The Grotto	Woburn Park, Woburn	Grotto	c. 1839	23 January 1961	SP9669032654; 51°59′02″N 0°35′37″W	1114010	The Grotto More images
The Old Parsonage	Woburn	House	Mid-18th century	22 October 1952	SP9489633231; 51°59′22″N 0°37′10″W	1321695	The Old Parsonage More images
The Thornery	Woburn Park, Woburn	Cottage ornee	1808	4 August 1980	SP9718334324; 51°59′56″N 0°35′09″W	1158441	Upload Photo
4–7 Market Place	Woburn	House	Late 18th century	22 October 1952	SP9493533173; 51°59′20″N 0°37′08″W	1157972	4–7 Market Place More images

== Luton ==
Luton has no Grade II* listed buildings.

== See also ==
- Grade I listed buildings in Bedfordshire
