= Gilbert Inglefield =

Architect, Lord Mayor of London (1909–1991)

Sir Gilbert Samuel Inglefield (13 March 1909 – 14 October 1991) was a British architect and Lord Mayor of London from November 1967 to November 1968.

Inglefield was the son of Admiral Sir Frederick Samuel Inglefield KCB FRGS DL, and Millicent Evelyn Cecilia Crompton the heiress of the Derbyshire banker John Gilbert Crompton

He was an Alderman of the City of London. In 1957, he was appointed chairman of the Barbican Committee, responsible for building the Barbican Estate, replacing Eric Wilkins, who had died.

He appeared as a castaway on the BBC Radio programme Desert Island Discs on 1 July 1968; his chosen favourite piece of music, book and luxury item were "The Nightingale Chorus" from Handel's Solomon, A History of Western Philosophy by Bertrand Russell, and Botticelli's The Mystical Nativity from the National Gallery, respectively.

On 23 September 1968, he laid the foundation stone of the relocated London Bridge, at Lake Havasu City, Arizona, United States.

From 1950 to 1976 he lived at Eggington House, the manor house of the village of Eggington, near Leighton Buzzard, Bedfordshire. Gilbert Inglefield Middle School (now Gilbert Inglefield Academy) at Leighton Buzzard was named in his honour.

His brother, Colonel John Frederick Crompton-Inglefield of Parwich Hall, served as High Sheriff of Derbyshire in 1938.

== Awards and honours ==
Inglefield was knighted in the 1965 New Year Honours, and appointed a Knight Grand Cross of the Order of the British Empire (GBE) in the 1968 Birthday Honours.
