= John Owen Sanders =

British railway engineer (1892–1954)

Sir John Owen Sanders CMG MIT AMICE
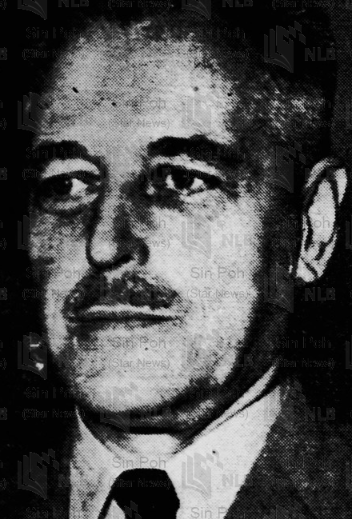
- Sanders from a 1954 publication
- Born: 30 September 1892
- Died: 21 March 1954 (aged 61); London
- Education: Manchester University
- Occupations: Railway engineer and administrator
- Years active: 1924–1954

Sir John Owen Sanders (30 September 1892 – 21 March 1954) was a British railway engineer and administrator who served as General Manager of Malayan Railways from 1946 to 1953. During his thirty years of service in Malaya, he played a leading role in the development of the railways and its rehabilitation after the Second World War.

== Early life and education ==
Sanders was born on 30 September 1892. He was educated at Elstow School; Owen's College, and Manchester University.

== Career ==
Sanders received his training with London and North Western Railway company locomotive works at Crewe. From 1915 to 1920, he was in army service. In 1924, he went to Malaya where he served as works manager of Federated Malay States Railways, and was tasked with reorganising the railway's workshops. In 1927, he was transferred to the post of locomotive superintendent and in 1930, on the amalgamation of the commercial, traffic and locomotive departments, he was appointed transportation manager. In 1934, he served as acting General Manager.

Sanders was evacuated from Singapore the day before it was captured by the Japanese. The ship was sunk but he escaped, reaching Sumatra and eventually India. In 1942, he entered war service having been commissioned into the Royal Engineers and was sent to Eritrea as Director of Transport. In the following year, he was appointed to the Malayan Planning Unit attached to the War Office where he was responsible for ordering equipment for technical services. In 1945, he returned to Malaya where he served as Technical Adviser to the Chief Civil Affairs Officer, Malaya. In 1946, he served as Senior Civil Affairs Officer for Malaya.

In 1946, Sanders was appointed General Manager of Malayan Railways, with the rank Brigadier, while from 1951 to 1954 also serving as Member for Railways and Ports. While in office, he is credited with restoring the railway system in Malaya after it suffered severely during the Japanese occupation. Much of the track had been torn up, many bridges had been destroyed, and most of the locomotive and wagon stock was unusable or had been moved abroad. Many of the railway workshops had been destroyed in air raids. His post-war programme of rehabilitation of the railways, including returning locomotives and rolling stock, tracks and workshops to their pre-War condition, despite the added difficulties caused by the Malayan Emergency, was regarded as a great achievement. He retired as general manager in 1953. In the same year, he also served as temporary member of the Federal Executive and Legislative Councils.

== Personal life and death ==
Sanders married Margaret Flachner in 1933. He was chairman of the Railway Institute in Malaya and an associate member of the Institution of Civil Engineers.

Sanders was due to retire in April 1954, but died on 21 March 1954 at Middlesex Hospital, London having been taken ill and flown to England.

== Honours ==
Sanders was appointed Companion of the Order of St Michael and St George (CMG) in the 1948 Birthday Honours. He was created a Knight Bachelor in the 1954 New Year Honours.
