= Listed buildings in Elstow =

Elstow is a civil parish in Bedford, Bedfordshire, England. It contains 31 listed buildings that are recorded in the National Heritage List for England. Of these, three are listed at Grade I, two are listed at Grade II*, the middle of the three grades, and the others are at Grade II, the lowest grade. The parish adjoins the large town of Bedford. Almost all the listed buildings are houses. Also listed are a church, a moot hall, two public houses and the ruined Hillersdon mansion.

== Key ==
Grade	Criteria
I	Buildings of exceptional interest, sometimes considered to be internationally important
II*	Particularly important buildings of more than special interest
II	Buildings of national importance and special interest

== Buildings ==
Name and location	Photograph	Date	Notes	Grade
Elstow Lower School	—	1873	School dates from 1873.	II
War Memorial at Elstow Lower School; 52.11794°N 0.46873°W	—	1919	War memorial to both the First and Second World Wars.	II
172 High Street; 52.1172°N 0.4689°W	—	1700s or earlier	A thatched house dating back to the seventeenth century. It became a listed building on 13 July 1964. The building was originally grade I listed but downgraded to grade II in 2018.	II
Base of Market Cross; 52.11587°N 0.46995°W	—	medieval	Remains of Elstow's medieval market cross.	II
Barn to North of Number 200, Wilstead Road; 52.10961°N 0.46591°W	—	19th century	Small 19th century timber framed barn with a thatched roof.	II
173 High Street	—	17th century	17th century timber-framed house.	II
Parish Church Tower; 52.11507°N 0.46956°W		15th century	Parish church tower, stands on its own northwest of the main parish church.	I
193 Wilstead Road	—	17th century	Timber-framed house.	II
Bunyan's Mead, 28 High Street; 52.11519°N 0.46698°W	—		Timber-framed house.	II
St Helena	—	17th century	17th century timber-framed house with some 19th-century additions.	II
The Old Vicarage	—	1796	Former vicarage.	II
174 High Street	—	16th Century	16th Century timber-framed house.	II
Bunyan's Mead, 19 and 20 High Street; 52.11553°N 0.46752°W	—	16th Century	Pair of 16th-century cottages that were renovated in the 1970s	II
215 and 216, West End Lane	—	17th Century	17th Century house that was later divided into two.	II
Post Office	—	1700	18th century house that was a post office	II
Village Farmhouse	—	17th Century	17th Century farmhouse with some 19th or possible 20th century alterations.	II
Merrick Cottage; 196 Wilstead Road; 52.11106°N 0.46579°W	—	18th Century	House that was previously two 18th-century cottages.	II
199 and 200, Wilstead Road	—	18th Century	Pair of 18th-century cottages.	II
Lynn Farmhouse	—	17th Century	17th century farmhouse with some 19th-century alterations	II
170 and 171 High Street	—	17th Century	Two 17th-century timber-framed houses which could have potentially been one.	II
204 High Street	—	1600	Timber-framed house from the 1600s.	II
Red Lion Public House	—	1798	Public House	II
Bunyan's Mead, 1-11 High Street; 52.11613°N 0.46813°W		15th Century	Row of 15th-century or potentially older houses, with some alterations in the succeeding centuries.	II*
208-210 Church End	—	1600	17th century house now divided into three.	II
Swan Public House	—	16th Century	Public House	II
Acacia Cottage	—	17th Century	Timber-framed house that was previously two 17th-century houses.	II
Parish Church of St Mary and St Helena		1078	Parish church that was formerly part of a nunnery founded in the 11 century. Many additions and alterations were made to the church between the 12th and 16th centuries. It was restored in 1881.	I
Bunyan's Mead, 12-17 High Street; 52.11571°N 0.46777°W		16th Century	Row of 16th-century houses that were restored in the 1970s.	II
Green Corner	—	17th Century	House.	II
Moot Hall		1500	Moot Hall from 1500.	II*
Hillersdon Mansion		1620-1630	Mansion built for Thomas Hillersdon in 1620-1630 it incorporates parts of cloisters from a Benedictine abbey.	I
