= Bletsoe Castle =

Castle in Bedfordshire, England

- Bletsoe, Bedfordshire, England
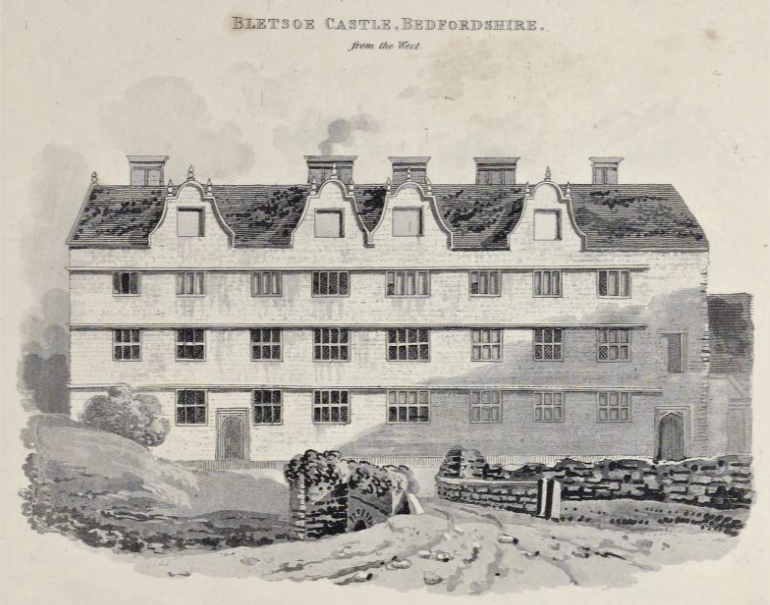

Site information
- Type: Fortified manor house
- Condition: Earthworks only remain, with parts of the later 16–17th century building

Location
- Bletsoe Castle shown within Bedfordshire
- Location within Bedfordshire
- Coordinates: 52.21435°N 0.50131°W
- Grid reference: grid reference TL024584

Site history
- Built by: John Pateshull

Listed Building – Grade II*
- Official name: Bletsoe Castle
- Designated: 7 May 1952
- Reference no.: 1114219

Scheduled monument
- Official name: Moated site with garden earthworks at Bletsoe Castle
- Designated: 4 March 1963
- Reference no.: 1012365

Bletsoe Castle was a late medieval fortified manor house in the village of Bletsoe, Bedfordshire, England.

== Details ==
Bletsoe Castle was created by John Pateshull, who received a licence to crenellate an existing manor house on the east side of Bletsoe in 1327. Pateshull had owned the manor of Bletsoe since 1313, but with the death of his mother, in 1324, he inherited additional lands, allowing him to acquire permission to crenellate the property.

In 1421 the house descended to Margaret Beauchamp who married Sir Oliver St John. On his death in 1437 she remarried John Beaufort, 1st Duke of Somerset and had one daughter, Margaret Beaufort, Countess of Richmond and Derby, who was born in the house on 31 May, although it remains in dispute whether she was born in 1441 or 1443. Margaret Beaufort later became the mother of Henry VII of England.

The house later passed down in the St John of Bletsoe family. In the late 16th or early 17th century, a new building was erected around the castle, quadrangular in design with three or four storeys and gable windows. Much of this later building was pulled down, leaving a much smaller building, still incorporating parts of the older castle, within the older medieval earthworks.

Today the castle is a scheduled monument and a Grade II* listed building. The medieval moat has a diameter of 130 metres (430 ft), is on average 18 metres (59 ft) wide and 2.4 metres (7 ft 10 in) deep. The moat is water-filled in parts though the south side has been destroyed by the construction of agricultural buildings over it.

== See also ==
- Castles in Great Britain and Ireland
- Grade II* listed buildings in Bedfordshire
- List of castles in England

== Bibliography ==
- MacKenzie, James Dixon. (1896/2009) The Castles of England: Their Story and Structure. General Books LLC. ISBN 978-1-150-51044-1.
- Rickard, John. (2002) The castle community: the personnel of English and Welsh castles, 1272–1422. Woodbridge, UK: Boydell Press. ISBN 978-0-85115-913-3.
