= Moot Hall, Elstow =

Municipal building in Bedfordshire, England

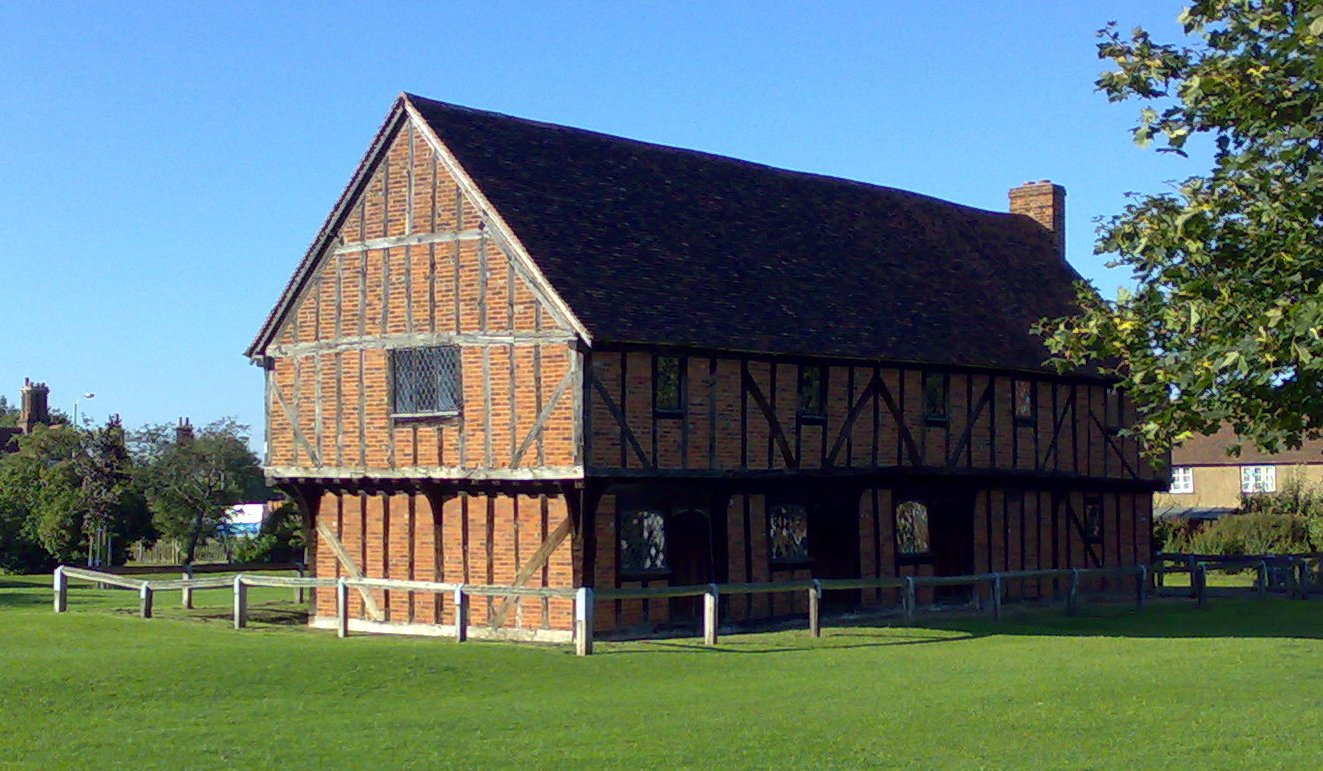
- Moot Hall, Elstow

- Location in Bedfordshire
- 52.1160°N 0.4690°W
- Location: The Green, Elstow, Bedfordshire, England
- OS grid reference: TL0492947518

History
- Built: c. 1500
- Built for: Elstow Abbey

Site notes
- Architectural style: Tudor
- Website: moothall.weebly.com

Listed Building – Grade II*
- Official name: Moot Hall
- Designated: 13 July 1964
- Reference no.: 1136906

The Moot Hall, also known as the Green House, is a medieval structure on The Green in Elstow, Bedfordshire, England. The structure, which currently operates as a museum, is a Grade II* listed building.

== History ==
The building was originally commissioned as a market hall to serve Elstow Abbey. It was designed in the Tudor style, built in timber frame in-filled with wattle and daub and was completed around 1500. The original design involved an asymmetrical main frontage of four bays facing onto Church End. On the ground floor, the first three bays from the west end featured round headed doorways which provided access to the original shop units. The first floor involved extensive use of jettied timber framing allowing the creation of extra space for the meeting room on that floor. The building was fenestrated by bi-partite casement windows on the ground floor and by single casement windows on the first floor. The roof was formed by rows of clay tiles.

In addition to being used as a manorial court, the room on the first floor was used for hearings of the court of piepowders which resolved commercial disputes among merchants. Following the dissolution of the monasteries, the estate was leased to Edward Harvey. His daughter, Isabel Harvey, married the local Member of Parliament, Humphrey Radcliffe, and in July 1553, he was granted ownership of the estate.

The building was extended to the east by an extra bay later in the 16th century, and, around the same time, the wattle and daub was replaced by bricks. The estate was then acquired by a local squire, Sir Thomas Hillersden, in 1616. The moot hall was one of the venues at which the writer, John Bunyan, who was born in the village, developed his nonconformist ideas in the mid-17th century.

The estate was then acquired by the brewer, Samuel Whitbread, in 1792. The Whitbread family allowed a religious group known as "the Congregation of the Bunyan Meeting" to use the moot hall for their meetings during much of the 19th century. Major Simon Whitbread presented the Moot Hall to Bedfordshire County Council in 1950 and council restored the building as part of their celebrations for the Festival of Britain. It became a museum displaying items related to John Bunyan in 1951 and works of art in the museum include a painting by Andrew Geddes depicting Bunyan in prison.

== See also ==
- Grade II* listed buildings in Bedfordshire
- Listed buildings in Elstow
