= The Paranormal Diaries: Clophill =

- Film poster
- Directed by: Kevin Gates; Michael Bartlett
- Written by: Kevin Gates
- Starring: Craig Stovin; Criselda Cabitac; Kevin Gates
- Cinematography: George Carpenter
- Edited by: Kevin Gates
- Music by: Pete Renton
- Production companies: Bleeding Edge Films; Off World Films
- Distributed by: Second Sight Films
- Release date: 24 August 2013 (Film4 FrightFest)
- Running time: 88 minutes
- Country: United Kingdom
- Language: English

The Paranormal Diaries: Clophill (also stylized as Paranormal Diaries: Clophill) is a 2013 British horror film that was written and directed by Kevin Gates and co-directed by Michael Bartlett. The film had its world premiere on 24 August 2013 at the London FrightFest Film Festival. The Paranormal Diaries: Clophill, which contains both factual interviews and a written storyline, centers on the St Mary's Church in Clophill and rumours that the church is the site of paranormal and occult activity. In September 2014, writer Kevin Gates released a book tie-in containing his research material for the film.

== Synopsis ==
The film follows a film crew over a long weekend during the summer solstice at the St Mary's Church in Clophill, which has long been rumored to be a supernatural hot spot. On the first day a film crew spend their time interviewing various locals and witnesses to events up at the ruin. They are told that the church was home to black magic rituals and that one in 1963 involved the bones of a corpse from the late 1700s. The following day the crew chooses to investigate the surrounding cemetery in hopes of finding a ghost and are joined by a paranormal investigation group. Fearing that they will be bothered by people intent on vandalizing the property, they also decide to hire a security team.

On the third day the crew witness a group in the woods drumming, but do not approach them. Later that night the crew chooses to take turns monitoring one of the locations where supernatural activity allegedly took place, resulting in a number of strange events, including a sinister face seen watching them. The police arrive and two of the crew decide to investigate beyond the church into the woods and stumble upon a black magic ceremony and are forced to flee. The following day the police are unable to find any trace of the ritual. The remaining crew members go home, however Criselda and Craig find that their daughter is behaving oddly and is in contact with a hostile spirit.

== Cast ==
- Craig Stovin as himself
- Criselda Cabitac as herself
- Kevin Gates as himself
- Michael Bartlett as himself
- Mark Jeavons as himself
- Rob Whitaker as himself

== Reception ==
Critical reception for The Paranormal Diaries: Clophill has been mixed. Common praise for the film centered upon the directors' usage of real-life interviews with people familiar with St Marys Church and blurring the boundaries between fact and fiction, as they felt that it added a level of realism to the movie's premise. Criticism mostly centered upon what the reviewers felt was the movie not living up to its potential and for being too overly derivative of similar found footage films.
