= Leedon =

Area of Leighton Buzzard, Bedfordshire, England

Coordinates: 51.9196°N 0.64922°W

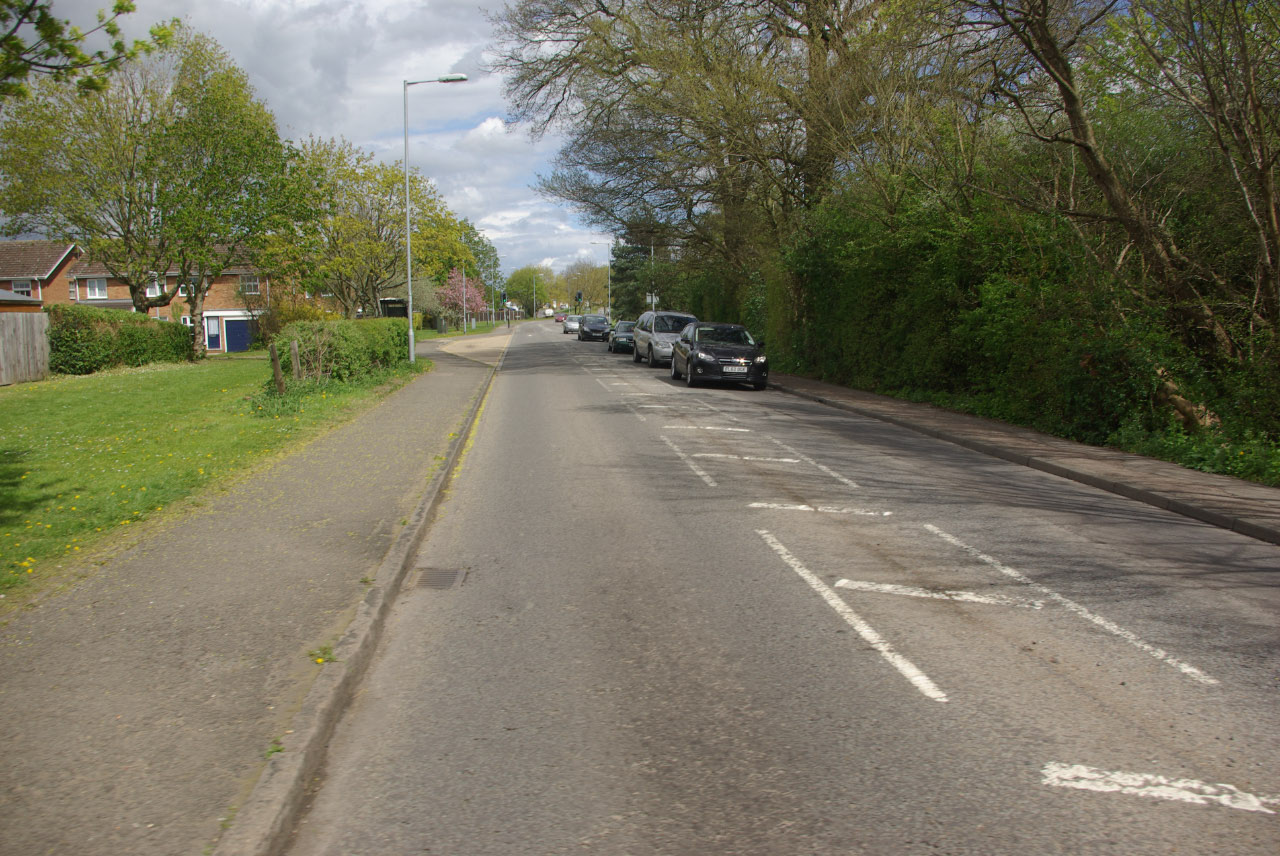
- Hockliffe Road at Leedon

- Location within Bedfordshire
- OS grid reference: SP929254
- Civil parish: Leighton-Linslade
- Unitary authority: Central Bedfordshire
- Ceremonial county: Bedfordshire
- Region: East
- Country: England
- Sovereign state: United Kingdom
- Post town: LEIGHTON BUZZARD
- Postcode district: LU7
- Dialling code: 01525
- Police: Bedfordshire
- Fire: Bedfordshire
- Ambulance: East of England
- UK Parliament: South West Bedfordshire

Leedon is a former hamlet in Bedfordshire, England, which is now part of Leighton Buzzard town. Originally, Leedon was a small rural settlement and was part of the Eggington civil parish. However, the expansion of Leighton Buzzard eastwards led to Leedon being encompassed in the wider Leighton-Linslade urban area. Today, Leedon represents the eastern part of Leighton Buzzard town. At the 2011 Census the population of the hamlet was included in the civil parish of Leighton-Linslade
