= Eggington House =

Listed building in Bedfordshire, England

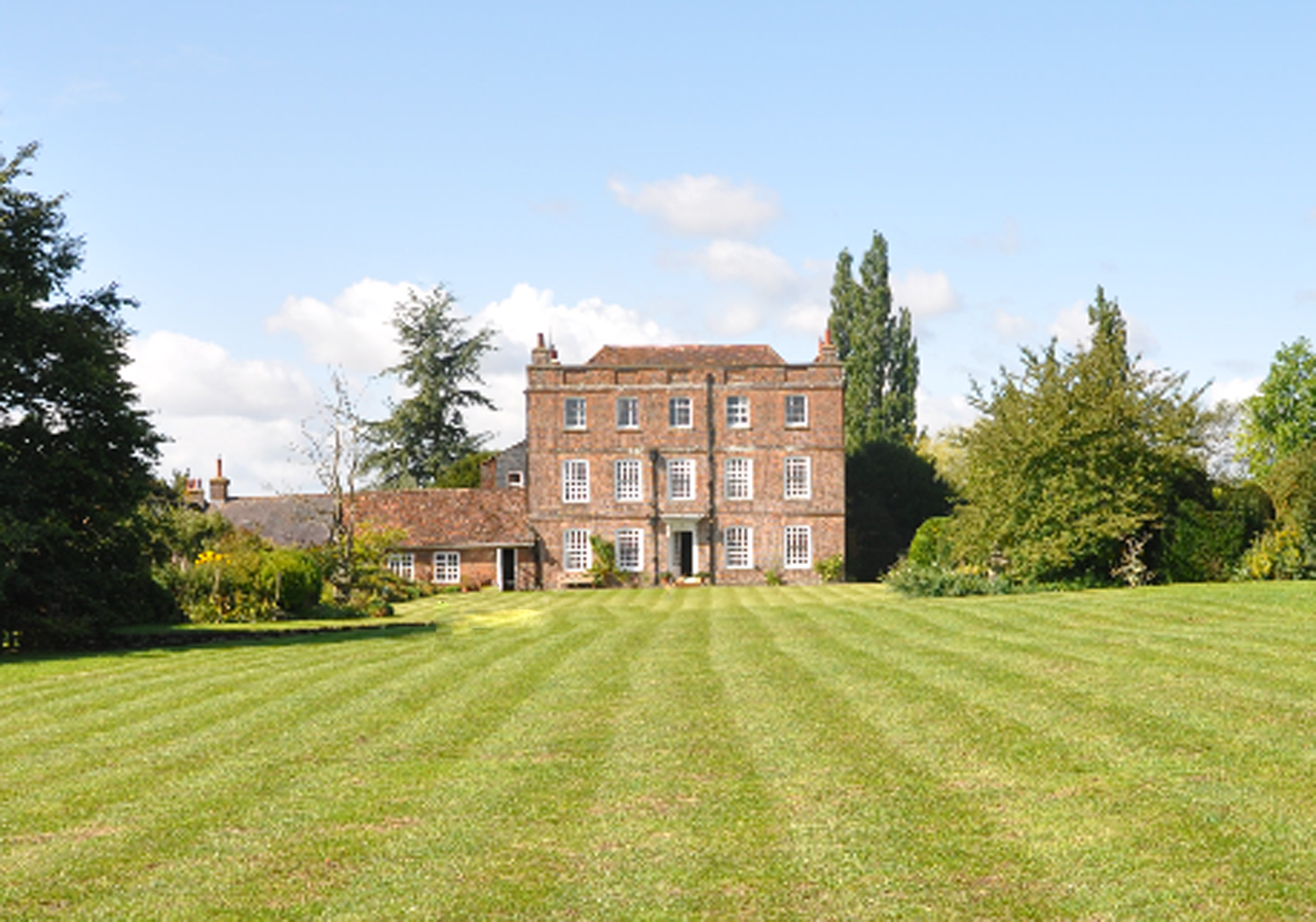
- Eggington House in 2016

- Location within Bedfordshire

General information
- Location: Eggington, Bedfordshire, England
- Coordinates: 51.9173°N 0.61145°W
- Ordnance Survey: SP9604925356
- Year built: 1696
- Client: John Reynal

Listed Building – Grade II*
- Official name: Eggington House
- Designated: 29 April 1952
- Reference no.: 1114682

Eggington House is the manor house of the village of Eggington situated near Leighton Buzzard, Bedfordshire, England. The house is regarded as a very fine example of late 17th-century domestic architecture, and is a Grade II* listed building. At the time of its construction in 1696 it was completely up to date and innovative in its design - which was unusual in the provinces, where architectural styles usually lagged behind that of the larger cities.

The small mansion, built for a Huguenot from Montauban in France, a Merchant taylor John Renouille who became Sheriff of Bedfordshire. The house is of red brick. The main facade is of seven bays of classical sash windows and three storeys tall. The roof line is concealed by a panelled parapet decorated with urns. The interior contains a staircase with twisted balusters.

The house has had a varied ownership, the Renouille family anglicised their name to Reynal moved to nearby Hockliffe Grange and let Eggington. The last of the Reynal's predeceased his wife, who remarried which caused the property to pass to her new husband Francis Moore. By 1840 Eggington House belonged to a family called Adams. Later, circa 1900, it belonged to a family called Hodgson who frequently entertained the suffragette Sylvia Pankhurst. During World War I the house was requisitioned by the Army. From 1950 to 1976 it was the home of Sir Gilbert Inglefield, the 1967 Lord Mayor of London, and his wife. It was then the residence of Lord Slynn of Hadley and his wife.

Today, the house remains in private ownership.

== The Reynal family ==
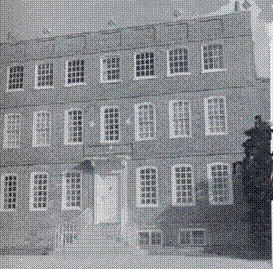
Eggington House circa 1900

John Reynal built Egglington House in 1696. He was a Huguenot from Montauban in France and became a prosperous tailor in London. In 1697 he married Mary Magdalen Marlett in London. They lived in the house for over 20 years and then in 1718 they bought Hockliffe and the family moved to this property and Egglington house was rented by many notable tenants.

John Reynal died in 1737 at St Andrews Holborn which was another property owned by him and is buried at Hockliffe Church with his wife Mary Magdalen who died in 1735. He left the house to his son John James Reynal (1714–1762) who became a barrister. He married Sarah Weale in 1737 and their eldest son John Sayer Weale Reynal inherited the house in 1762 when his father died.

John Sayer Weale Reynal (1749–1784) was born in 1749. In 1777 he became High Sheriff of Bedfordshire. He married Sarah Millard (1749–1835) who was the daughter of Collins Millard from Leighton Buzzard. Unfortunately John died in 1784 at the age of 35. He left his property to Sarah and in 1785 she married the widower Colonel Francis Moore (1747–1810) who was a wealthy landowner from Aspley Guise. He built Moore Place in Aspley Guise in 1786 which still exists today. He died in 1810 and Sarah died in 1835. In her Will Sarah left Egglington House and the other property she had inherited from the Reynal family to her nephew Millard Adams.

Millard Adams (1792–1871) was the son of William Adams and Sarah’s sister Mary Millard. When he died in 1871 his son John Warner Adams (1822–1903) inherited the house. When he died in 1903 he was described as one of the largest landowners in Bedfordshire. His son John James Reynal Adams (1848–1909) inherited his property. He did not marry and had no children but when he died in 1909 he left a trust which provided for his housekeeper Mrs Sarah Ann Mann. He stated that he did this “in grateful recognition of her many kindnesses to him and of her long residence with his family and particularly of her attention to his father in his illness and his infirmity." When she died he stated the estate was to go to Groom Cooper Bunker (1857–1932). This did occur when Mrs Mann died in 1925.

== John and Joan Hodgson ==
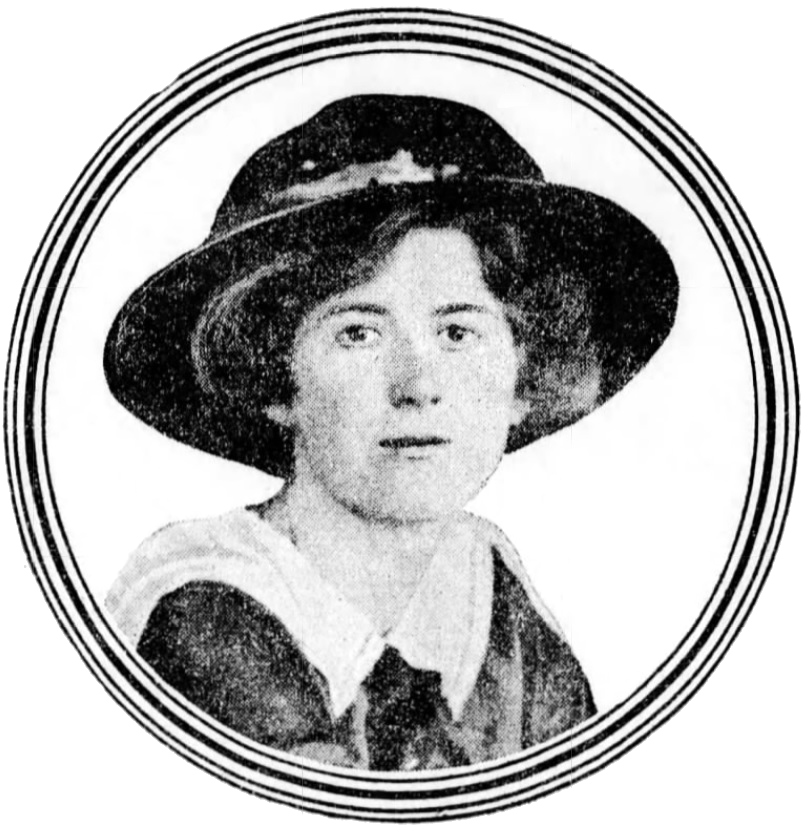
Joan Hodgson when she was Miss Joan Wickham, suffragette, 1913

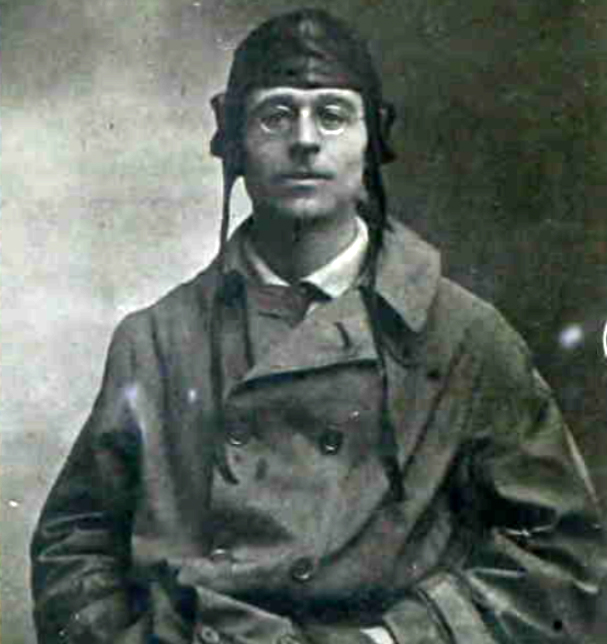
John Lawrence Hodgson when he obtained his flying certificate, 1917

John and Joan Hodgson lived at Eggington House between 1918 and 1936. During that time Sylvia Pankhurst, the famous suffragette made frequent visits to the house. Pankhurst was a friend of Joan when they were both in the suffragette movement. At that time her maiden name was Miss Joan Wickham and she was for some time the Secretary of Sylvia's famous mother Emmeline Pankhurst. In 1913 she organised Emmeline Pankhurst’s tour of the US and received a great deal of publicity for her work.

Joan was born Alice Joan Wickham in 1888 in London. Her father was Lieutenant Colonel Henry Wickham and her mother was Lady Ethelreda Caroline Gordon who was the daughter of Charles Gordon, Marquess of Huntly. Joan spent much of her childhood living at Barnwell Castle and later Cotterstock Hall.

In 1918 she married John Lawrence Hodgson who was a civil and electrical engineer. Immediately after their marriage the couple moved into Eggington House. Here they held numerous house parties. Besides Sylvia Pankhurst they entertained other notable people. One of these was Sir Albert Richardson, a leading architect who lived in Avenue House in Ampthill. In his biography his visits to Eggington House are mentioned. The house is described in the following terms:

"Eggington was tall and Queen Anne, three storeys of white sash windows looked out on to a carriage sweep and lavender-filled gardens, it deserved the high praise that John Hodgson had bestowed on it. The Hodgsons became firm friends and the visits between Ampthill and Eggington were frequent."

John Hodgson died in 1936 and Joan moved from Eggington House. She died 30 years later in Eton, Berkshire.

In 1952 Eggington House was designated a Grade II* listed building.

== See also ==
- Grade II* listed buildings in Bedfordshire
