= Clipstone, Bedfordshire =

Hamlet in Bedfordshire, England

Coordinates: 51.927°N 0.623°W

Clipstone
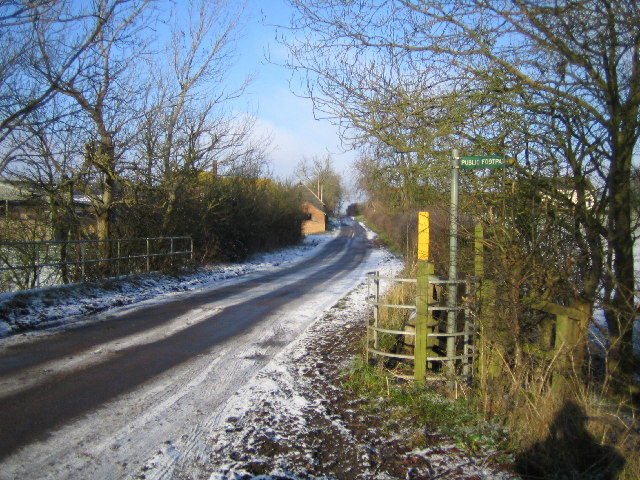
- Clipstone

- Location within Bedfordshire
- OS grid reference: SP946742
- Civil parish: Eggington
- Unitary authority: Central Bedfordshire
- Ceremonial county: Bedfordshire
- Region: East
- Country: England
- Sovereign state: United Kingdom
- Post town: LEIGHTON BUZZARD
- Postcode district: LU7
- Dialling code: 01525
- Police: Bedfordshire
- Fire: Bedfordshire
- Ambulance: East of England
- UK Parliament: South West Bedfordshire

Clipstone is a small hamlet in Bedfordshire, England. It lies within the parish of Eggington that borders with Leighton Buzzard, Heath and Reach and Hockliffe. The hamlet may be small but it gives its name to the largest tributary to the River Ouzel, the Clipstone Brook.

It has only a couple of farms and houses and lies on a back road leading off of the main A4012 road just outside the eastern end of Leighton Buzzard.
