= Flitwick Manor =

Listed house in Bedfordshire, England

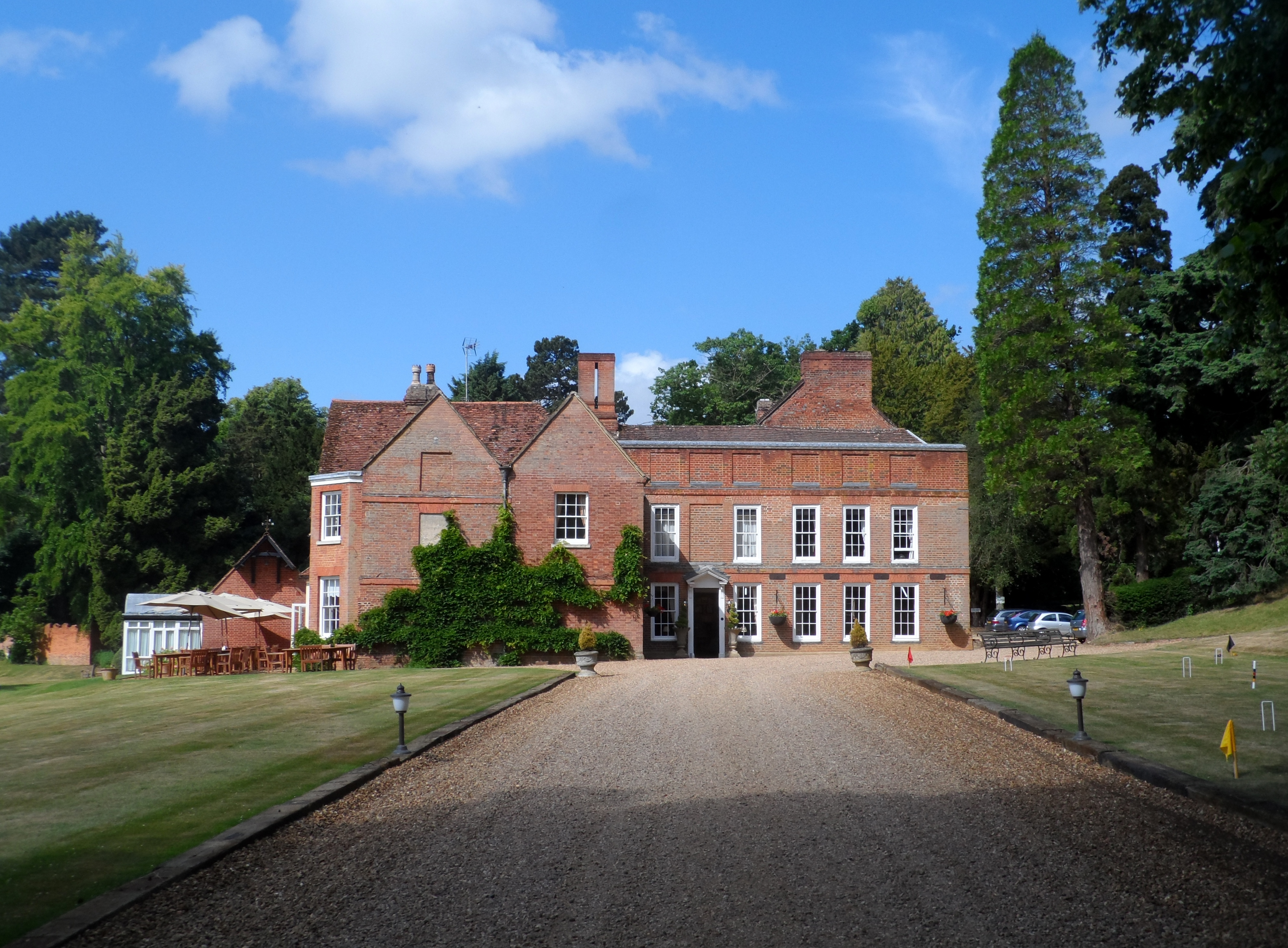
- Flitwick Manor in 2015

- Location within Bedfordshire

General information
- Architectural style: Georgian; Gothic Revival, garden frontage
- Location: Flitwick, Bedfordshire, England
- Coordinates: 51.9965°N 0.5024°W
- Years built: 18th century, with earlier origins and later additions
- Client: Edward Blofield
- Owner: Flitwick Town Council

Listed Building – Grade II*
- Official name: Flitwick Manor
- Designated: 22 October 1952
- Reference no.: 1137690

Listed Building – Grade II
- Official name: Grotto 50m west of Flitwick Manor
- Designated: 23 January 1961
- Reference no.: 1321732

National Register of Historic Parks and Gardens
- Official name: Flitwick Manor park and garden
- Designated: 1 July 1989
- Reference no.: 1000383

Flitwick Manor is a Georgian country house in the south of Flitwick, Bedfordshire, England. It is located on Church Road off the A5120. Now operating as a hotel, the manor is a Grade II* listed building. It is owned by Flitwick Town Council and much of the Grade II listed park is accessible to the public.

== History ==
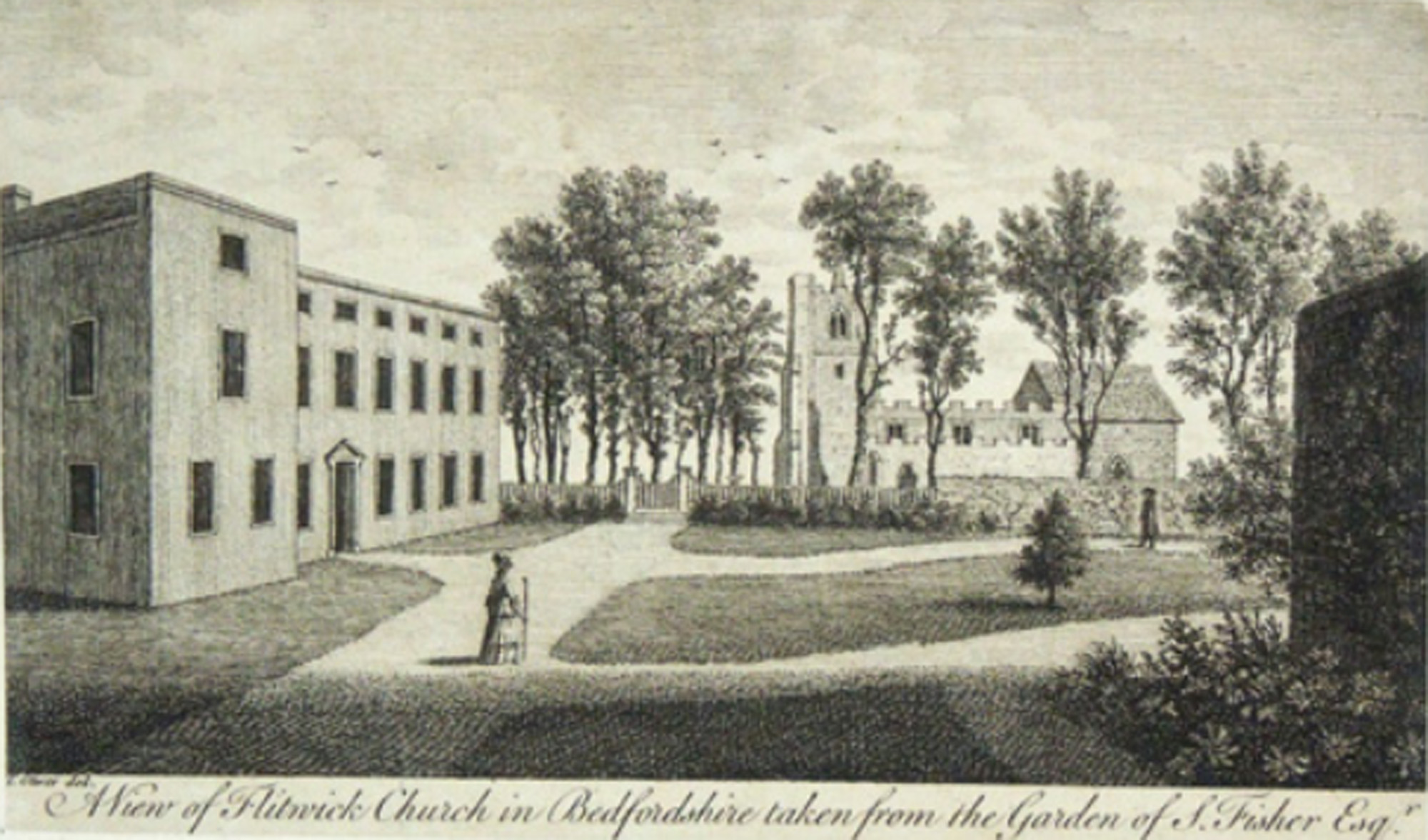
Flitwick Manor and Church 1776

Edward Blofield built Flitwick Manor in 1632. He died in 1663 and left the property to his wife Jane. In 1668 she married Samuel Rhodes and the property passed through the Rhodes family until it was bequeathed in 1736 by Benjamin Rhodes to Humphry Dell who was a relative. Humphry Dell (1706–1764) was a physician who practised in Flitwick. He was a friend of Jeffrey Fisher and acted as godfather to his daughter Anne who was born in 1757. When Dell died in 1764 he left Flitwick Manor to Anne Fisher, his goddaughter, but as she was only seven years old her father Jeffrey Fisher was the proprietor until she turned twenty-one. An engraving of Flitwick Manor was made during this time in 1776. Anne married James Hesse of Edmonton in 1778 but he died in 1783 and in 1789 she married George Brooks (1741–1817). The manor then came into the possession of the Brooks family where it remained for the next 145 years.

=== Brooks family ===
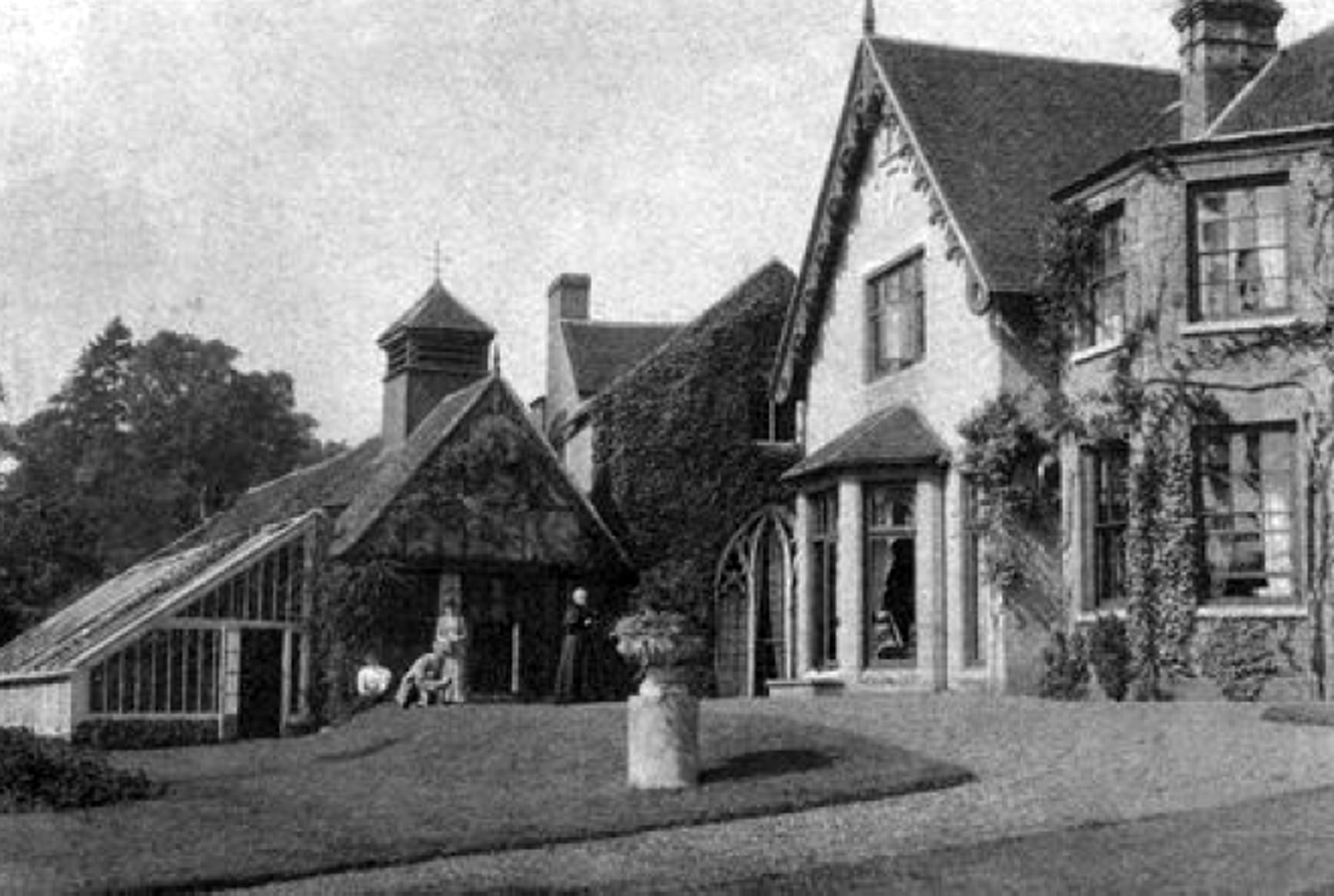
Playing croquet at Flitwick Manor in about 1870

George Brooks was a barrister and banker in London. After he married Anne he continued to live there and let Flitwick Manor to tenants. Robert Trevor was a very significant tenant as it was he who instigated the significant changes to the manor between 1793 and 1808. He agreed with George Brooks to pay half of the costs. In 1816 George's son John Thomas Brooks (1794–1858) was given Flitwick Manor on his marriage to Mary Hatfield. The couple lived there for the rest of their lives, and made extensive improvements. The grounds were praised by the landscape architect John Claudius Loudon in the 1820s and 1830s, especially the arboretum, planted in a "natural arrangement".

John Thomas Brooks wrote several diaries which give a picture of life at Flitwick Manor. The most important event in these diaries seems to be the death of his only daughter, Mary Ann Brooks (1822–1848), who died aged 26, in 1848. He was particularly fond of his garden and made major improvements to the grounds. When he died in 1858, his eldest son John Hatfield Brooks (1824–1907) inherited the manor.

Major John Hatfield Brooks was educated in Rugby, Warwickshire and later became an officer in the 1st Bengal Light Cavalry. He served over in British India. It was in Calcutta that he married Sophia Margaret Cloete in 1850. The couple had two daughters. When John died in 1907, his eldest daughter Catherine Mary Frances Brooks (1853–1934) inherited the house. Catherine did not marry and lived in the house until she died at the age of 81 in 1934. Her obituary outlined her work in the village of Flitwick and praised her generosity. When she died she had no heirs so she left the property to her cousin Robert Adolphus Lyall (1876–1948). When he died in 1948 it was left to John Comyn Lyall. He advertised it for sale in 1953.

=== Later history ===
After being advertised for sale, Flitwick Manor was bought by Anthony Gilkison, a film director, who lived there until the early 1970s, when it was purchased by the Saxby family. The manor stayed in private hands until 1984, when it was converted to a restaurant. This was sold in 1990 and the manor is now a hotel, operated by Best Western. In 2009 the main park, including the arboretum and two adjoining fields to the south of the property, were acquired by Flitwick Town Council to preserve it for the community. Access to the public is available during daylight hours. Disabled parking is available at the main entrance to the park on the corner of Dunstable Road and Church Road.

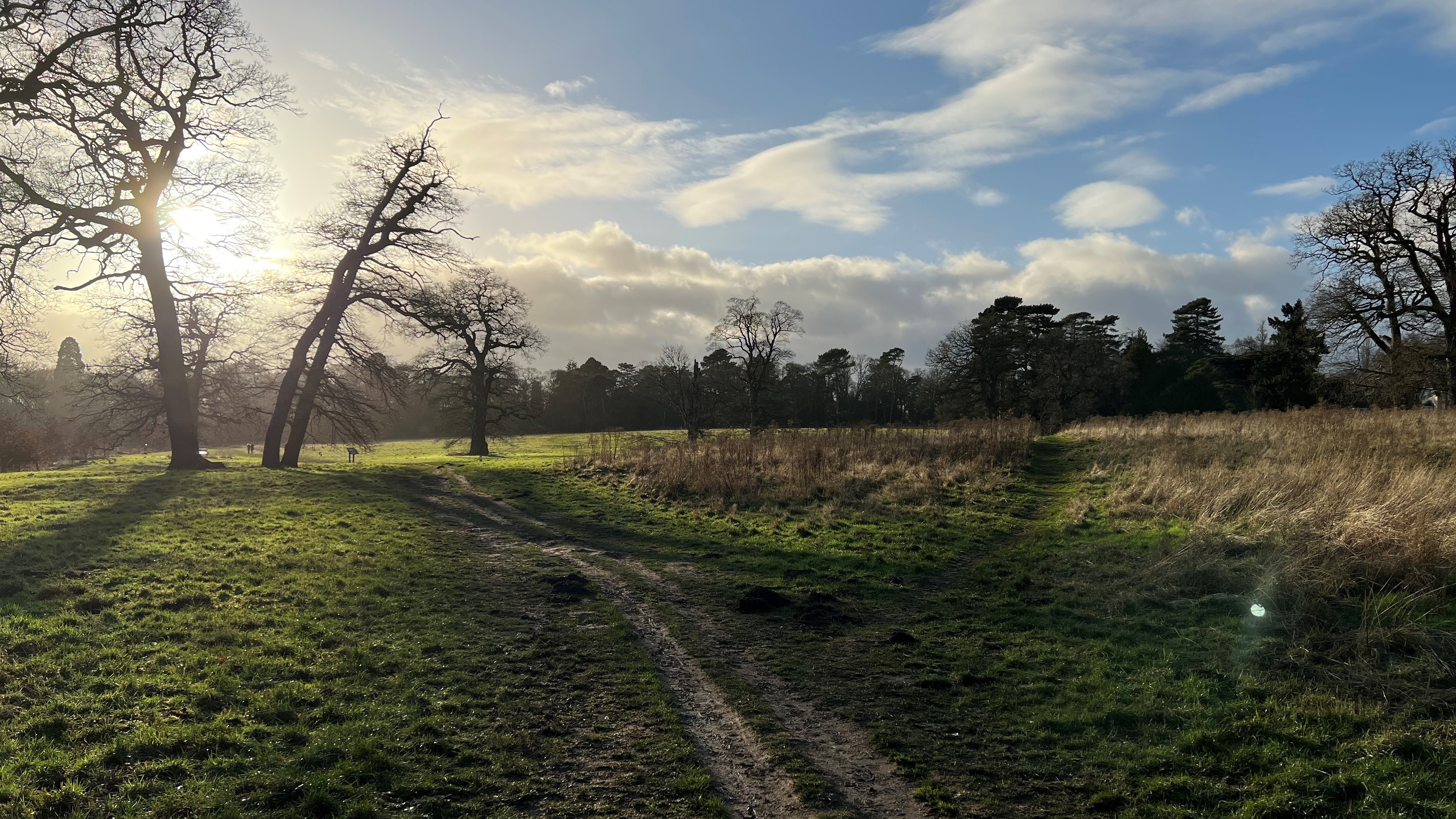
Manor Park looking south (January 2022)

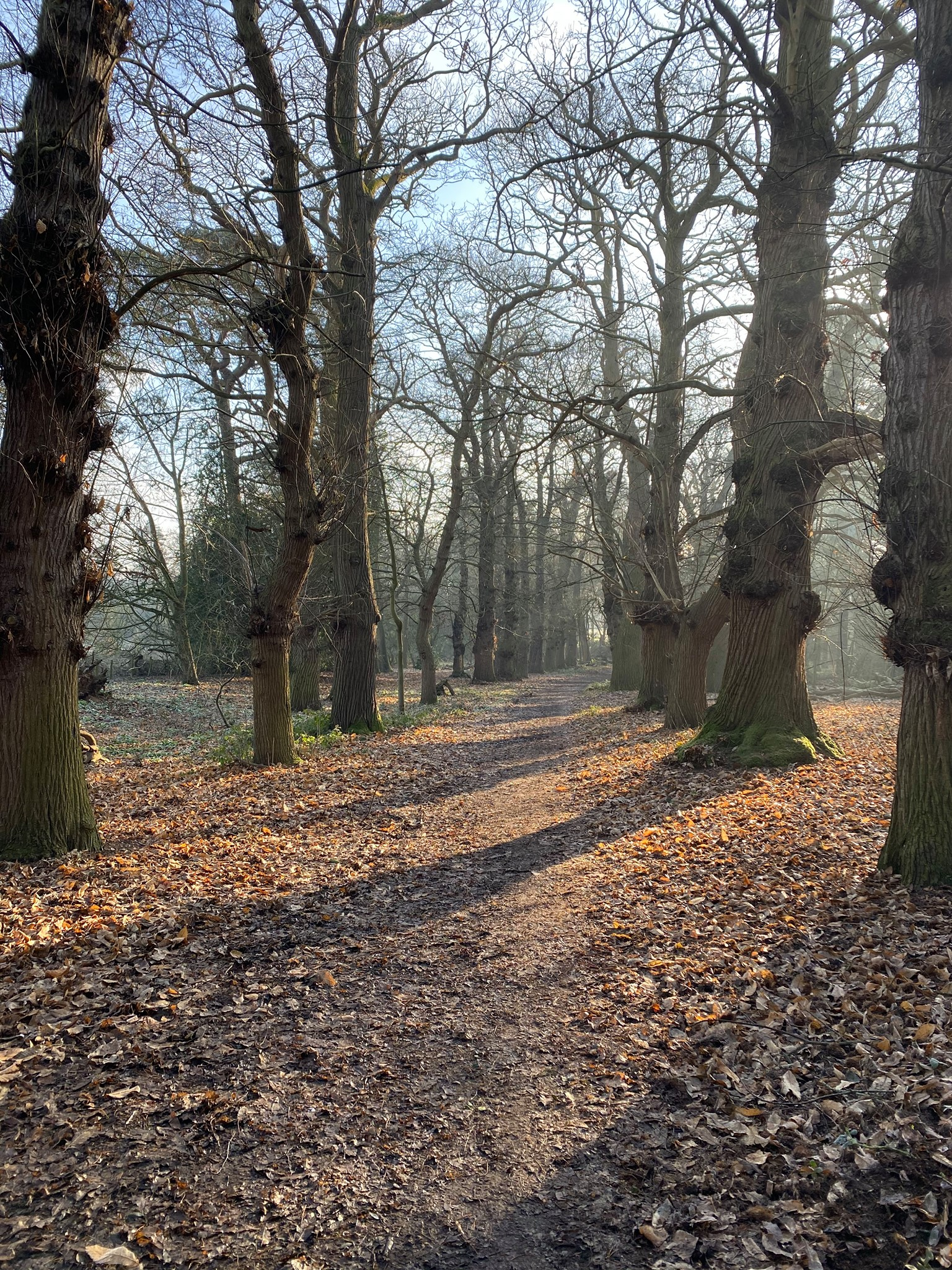
Manor Park - Sweet Chestnut Avenue and former carriage drive

== Architecture ==
The main part of the existing house is the entrance block which dates from the early 18th century. It is two-storeys and is built of red brick. This block encases the earlier 17th-century house and has a mansard roof below a parapet. The architectural style is Georgian, in contrast to the garden frontage which is later and was undertaken in a Gothic Revival style. Charles O'Brien, in his 2014 revised Bedfordshire, Huntingdonshire and Peterborough, in the Pevsner Buildings of England, series, identifies earlier work from the late 17th century and later, 19th and 20th century, extensions. Historic England dates the 20th-century work to 1936 and ascribes it to Sir Albert Richardson. (Note: Albert Richardson was a noted neoclassical architect and a founder of the Georgian Group. He lived in Bedfordshire for the latter part of his life, in a Georgian townhouse in Ampthill where he refused to install electricity on the grounds that living in the Georgian style enabled him to better understand Georgian architecture.) Flitwick Manor is a Grade II* listed building. The pleasure gardens surrounding the house were laid out by George and John Thomas Brooks in the late 18th and early 19th centuries. They were much admired by contemporaries, including Loudon. Much is now lost under 20th-century housing developments. The park is listed Grade II on the Register of Historic Parks and Gardens. A grotto in the grounds is also listed Grade II. (Note: The grotto mirrors the mixed architectural styles of the house in that its west frontage is Gothic while the east front is Neoclassical.)

== Popular culture ==
The manor was featured in the episode "The Jim Twins/Flitwick Ghost" of the ITV television series Strange but True? in 1995.

== See also ==
- Grade II* listed buildings in Bedfordshire

== Sources ==
- Adams, Paul; Brazil, Eddie (2013). Extreme Hauntings: Britain's Most Terrifying Ghosts. History Press. ISBN 978-0-7524-8956-8.
- Blaydes, Frederick Augustus (1890). Genealogia Bedfordiensis: Being a Collection of Evidences relating chiefly to the Land Gentry of Bedfordshire. London: The Chiswick Press. OCLC 865600360.
- Loudon, John Claudius (1838). Arboretum et fruticetum britannicum; or, the trees and shrubs of Britain, native and foreign, hardy and half-hardy, pictorially and botanically delineated, and scientifically and popularly described. OCLC 270646614.
- O'Brien, Charles; Pevsner, Nikolaus (2014) [1968]. Bedfordshire, Huntingdonshire and Peterborough. Buildings of England. New Haven, US and London: Yale University Press. ISBN 978-0-300-20821-4. OCLC 1276650843.
- O'Dell, Damien (2008). Paranormal Bedfordshire: True Ghost Stories. Stroud: Amberley. ISBN 978-1-445-62992-6.
- Puttick, Betty (1996). Ghosts of Bedfordshire. Newbury: Countryside Books. ISBN 978-1-853-06386-2.
- Thompson, Francis (2007). English Landed Society in the Nineteenth Century. New York & London: Routledge. ISBN 978-0-415-41285-8.
- Wiltshire, Kathleen (1973). Ghosts and legends of the Wiltshire countryside. Salisbury: Compton Russell Ltd. ISBN 978-0-859-55007-9.
