= Town Bridge, Bedford =

19th century bridge in Bedford, England

Coordinates: 52.1345°N 0.4662°W

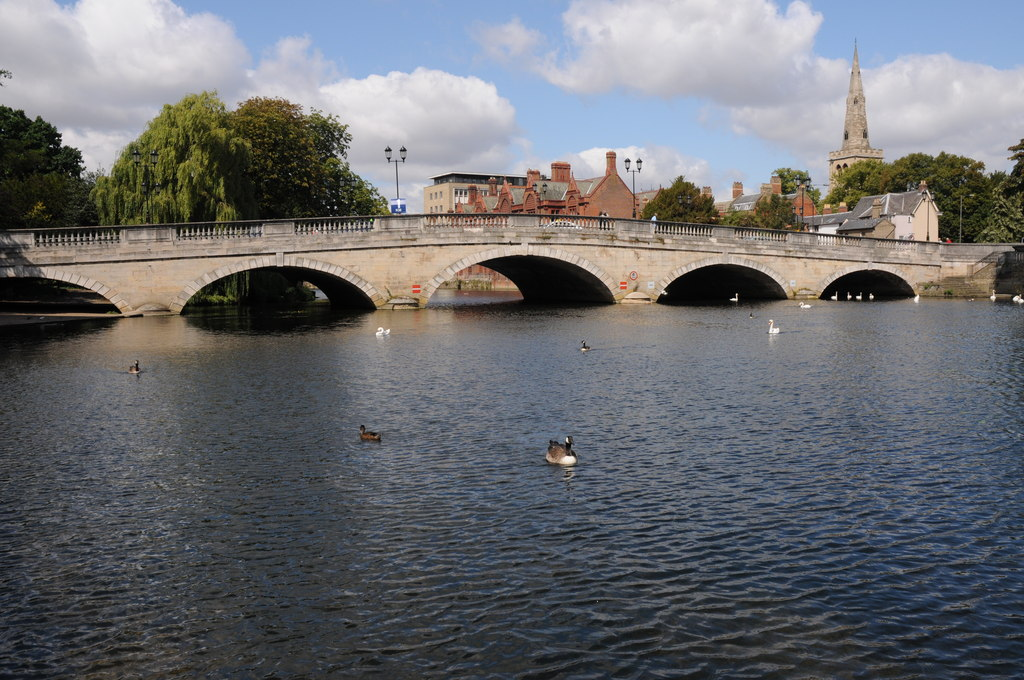
The bridge in 2011. The Shire Hall and St Paul's Church can be seen in the background

The Town Bridge is located in Bedford, the county town of Bedfordshire in England. Spanning the River Great Ouse, it connects the town centre of Bedford with St Johns, historically a separate settlement but now a suburb of Bedford.

The current bridge was designed by the architect John Wing between 1811 and 1813, replacing an earlier bridge said to date back to 1224.. It was widened between 1938 and 1940. The Swan Hotel and the remains of Bedford Castle are located nearby, the stone from the latter was said to have been used for construction of the medieval bridge. It has been Grade II listed, having first been listed in 1952.

== Bibliography ==
- Pevsner, Nikolaus. Bedfordshire and the County of Huntingdon and Peterborough. Yale University Press, 2002.
