= Bletsoe =

Village in Bedfordshire, England

Coordinates: 52.2130°N 0.5052°W

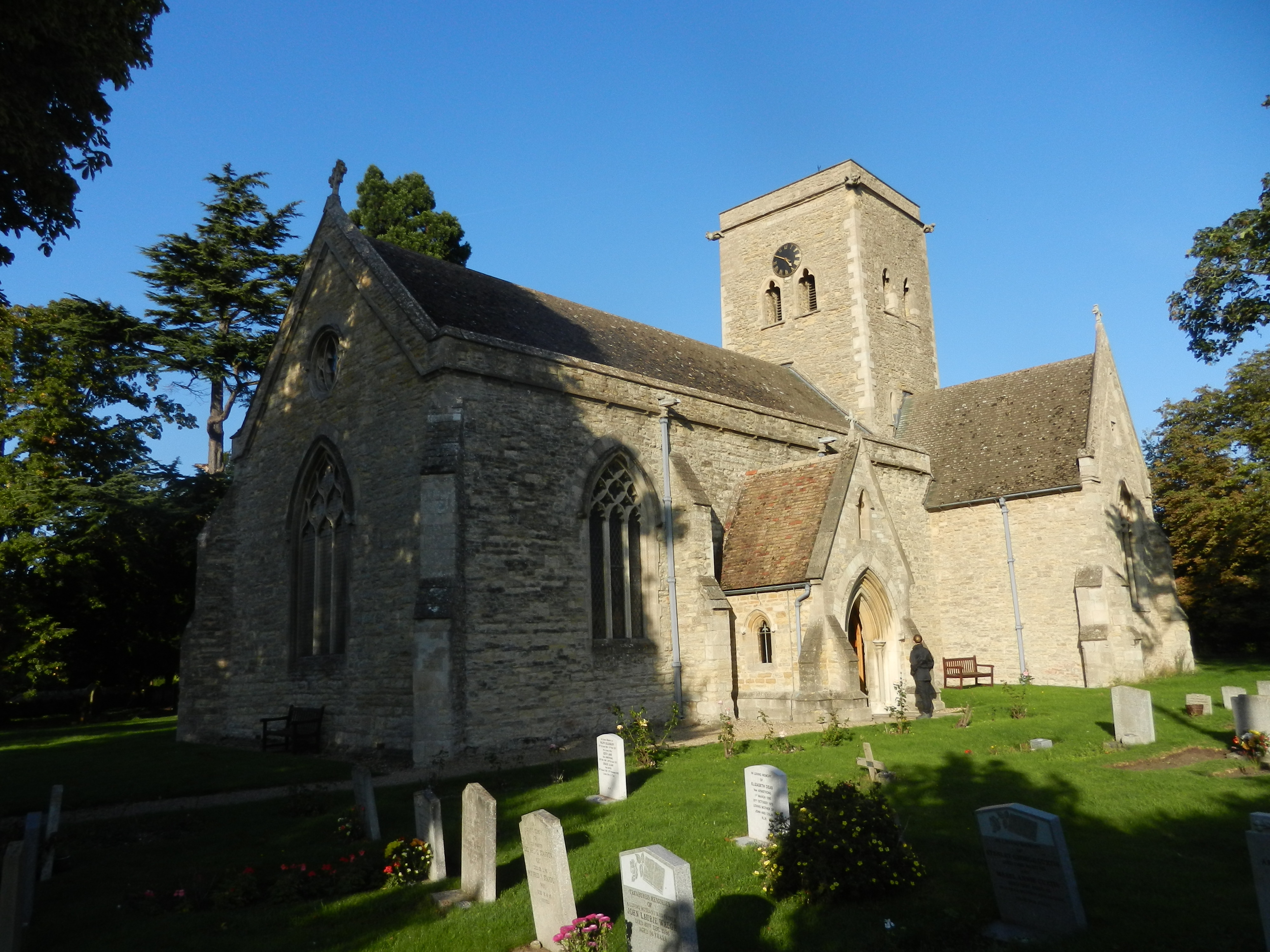
- Parish church of St Mary

- Location within Bedfordshire
- Population: 281; 260 (2011 Census)
- OS grid reference: TL025585
- Unitary authority: Bedford
- Ceremonial county: Bedfordshire
- Region: East
- Country: England
- Sovereign state: United Kingdom
- Post town: BEDFORD
- Postcode district: MK44
- Dialling code: 01234
- Police: Bedfordshire
- Fire: Bedfordshire
- Ambulance: East of England
- UK Parliament: North Bedfordshire

Bletsoe is a village and civil parish in Bedfordshire, England. It is on the A6, and about eight miles north of Bedford. The village has a small park, the former site of Bletsoe Castle and a church. Nearby places are Sharnbrook, Milton Ernest, Riseley, Thurleigh, Odell, Souldrop, and Swineshead. The nearest town to Bletsoe is Bedford.

The small hamlet of Bourne End borders Bletsoe and is part of the civil parish. In 1086, Bletsoe parish was within the ancient hundred of Buckelowe. The parish was added to the Hundred of Willey when the ancient hundred was parceled out.

Bletsoe Castle was the birthplace of Margaret Beaufort. She was the mother of Henry VII and grandmother of Henry VIII.
