= St Mary's Church, Woburn =

St Mary’s Church, Woburn
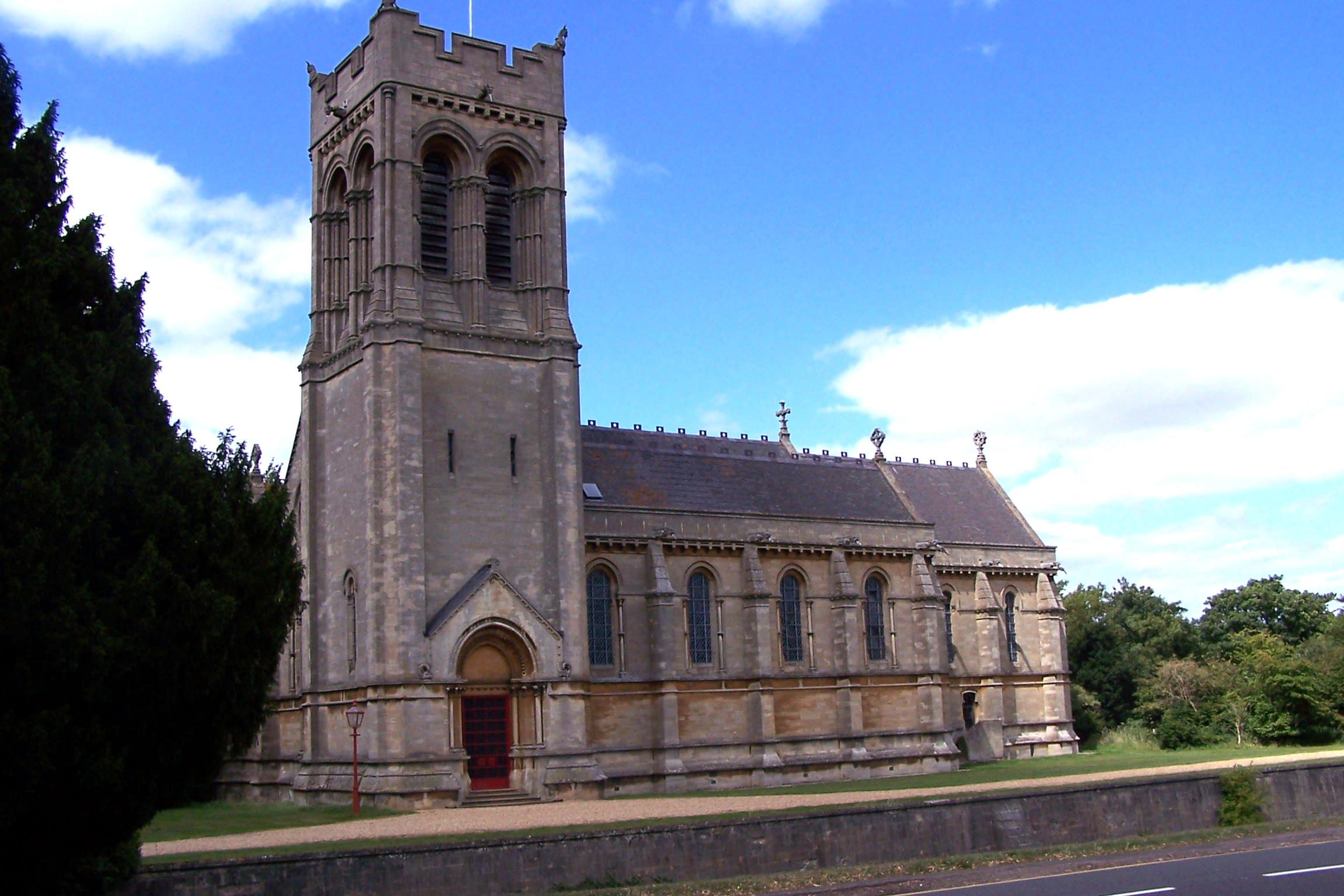
- St Mary’s Church, Woburn
- St Mary’s Church, Woburn
- 51°59′23.03″N 0°37′2.76″W
- OS grid reference: SP 95040 33273
- Location: Park Street, Woburn, Bedfordshire MK17 9PG
- Country: England
- Denomination: Church of England
- Website: woburnparishchurch.org.uk

History
- Founder: 8th Duke of Bedford
- Dedication: St Mary the Virgin
- Consecrated: 23 September 1868

Architecture
- Heritage designation: Grade II* listed
- Architect: Henry Clutton
- Construction cost: £30,000 (equivalent to £2,930,000 in 2025).

Specifications
- Length: 148 feet (45 m)
- Height: 61 feet (19 m)

Administration
- Province: Canterbury
- Diocese: St Albans
- Archdeaconry: Bedford
- Deanery: Ampthill and Shefford
- Parish: Woburn

St Mary's Church, Woburn, is a Grade II* listed parish church in the Church of England in Woburn, Bedfordshire.

== History ==
The church, on Park Street, Woburn, was built to the designs of the architect Henry Clutton between 1865 and 1868 and paid for by William Russell, 8th Duke of Bedford. It replaced the old parish church in the town which, except for the tower, was demolished when the new church opened.

The tower was equipped with a monster bell (said to be the largest in a parish church at the time) of 55 cwt (6,160 pounds (2,790 kg)), cast in C by Mears and Stainbank of London.

On opening the church tower was surmounted by a spire which reached to a height of 181 ft. This was itself crowned with a copper cross at its summit, which took the total height to 195 feet (59 m). However, structural problems caused the removal of the spire in 1890.

The church was consecrated on 23 September 1868 by the Rt. Revd. Harold Browne, Bishop of Ely.

The east window was inserted in 1894 as a memorial to George Russell, 10th Duke of Bedford and is by Charles Eamer Kempe.

== Organ ==
The original organ of 1868 by T.J. Robson was replaced in 1904 by a new instrument by Norman and Beard. A specification of the organ can be found on the National Pipe Organ Register.
