= St Mary's Church, Potsgrove =

Coordinates: 51.9590°N 0.6167°W

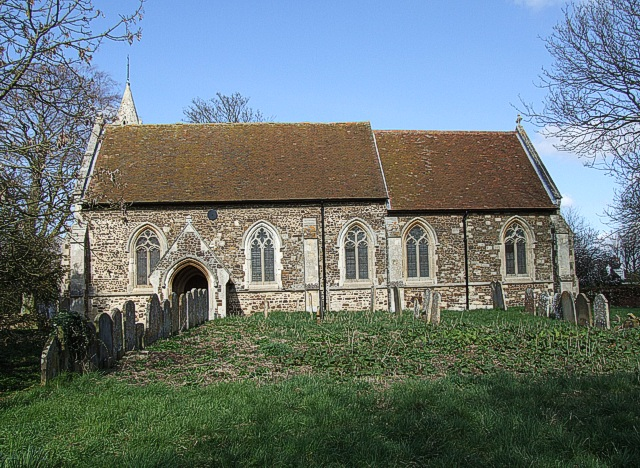
- St Mary's Church, Potsgrove, from the south

- Location in Bedfordshire
- OS grid reference: SP 951 298
- Location: Potsgrove, Bedfordshire
- Country: England
- Denomination: Anglican
- Website: Churches Conservation Trust

History
- Dedication: Saint Mary the Virgin

Architecture
- Functional status: Redundant
- Heritage designation: Grade II*
- Designated: 22 October 1952
- Architect: J. D. Sedding (restoration)
- Architectural type: Church
- Style: Gothic, Gothic Revival

Specifications
- Materials: Ironstone and clunch Roofs tiled

St Mary's Church is a redundant Anglican church in the village of Potsgrove, Bedfordshire. England. It is recorded in the National Heritage List for England as a designated Grade II* listed building, and is under the care of the Churches Conservation Trust. The church stands at the end of a country lane, north of the A5 road, some 5 miles (8 km) northeast of Leighton Buzzard.

== History ==
The church dates from the 14th century, and was "heavily reworked" in 1880–81 by the architect J. D. Sedding. The nave walls had been raised in the 15th century when the present roof was installed, and the chancel roof is of a later date. There are a few 12th and 13th-century stones incorporated in the fabric of the north wall of the nave, indicating that an earlier church was present on the side.

== Architecture ==
St Mary's is constructed mainly in ironstone rubble with some clunch, and has ashlar dressings. The roofs are tiled. Its plan consists of a nave with a south porch, a chancel, and a northwest bell turret. The east window in the chancel has five lights and contains panel tracery. On the north and south sides of the chancel are two two-light windows. There are similar windows in the nave, two on the north side and three on the south. On the north side is a doorway above which is a dripstone, its stops being carved with a male and a female head. In the south porch is another doorway with similar carvings. At the west end of the nave is a two-light window, above which is an ogee-headed niche containing a statue of the Virgin and Child. The bell turret is octagonal and has a stone spire. On each side of the turret are two tiers of openings. The spire contains lucarnes, and is surmounted by a cross finial.

The chancel is divided from the nave by a wooden screen, the older parts of which date from the 14th century. In the north wall of the chancel is a recessed tomb, and also in the chancel are a piscina and a sedilia. There are more piscinae in the nave. The font is constructed from Purbeck marble. In the wall of the nave are two brasses, one dated 1535 and the other from later in that century. In the west window of the nave are pieces of 14th and 15th-century stained glass.

== External features ==
In the churchyard are two items that have been designated Grade II listed buildings. The first is a limestone headstone dated (probably) 1711, and the other is a row of six limestone headstones dating from the late 18th and early 19th centuries.

== See also ==
- List of churches preserved by the Churches Conservation Trust in the East of England
