= St Mary's Church, Clophill =

Church in Bedfordshire, England

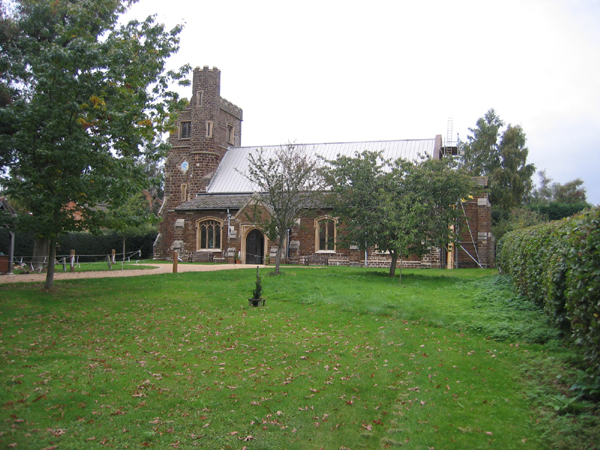
The Victorian St Mary's Church building continues to serve as the parish church of Clophill

The present St Mary's Church is located in the centre of the small village of Clophill, between Bedford and Luton in the county of Bedfordshire in the East of England. The new church, built in 1848, replaced the old church by order of the Church Commissioners in 1850. The old church building, formally The Church of St Mary The Virgin (shortened to The Church of St Mary) and known colloquially as Old St Mary's or The Old Parish Church, is at the edge of the village, and is estimated to be around 650 years old. It sits at the crest of the Greensand Ridge, offering views over the surrounding countryside. Its graveyard is a haven for wild flowers and wildlife. After the church moved to the village centre, incorporating various items from the old church building, the old building was converted for use as a mortuary chapel, but in the 1950s it fell into ruin.

The Church of England no longer has responsibility for the Old Parish Church, nor is it deemed to be consecrated; legally it is the responsibility of Central Bedfordshire Council.

It acquired first local, then more widespread, notoriety in the 1960s, as a result of the desecration of a number of the church's graves, with the attendant sensationalist suspicions of Satanism and black masses.

Several first hand, personal accounts are documented in the book "Clophill" by William Church. The short story mystery focuses on the young US Air Force airman stationed in England who becomes obsessed with solving the 900-year-old mysteries and dark legends surrounding the church ruins.

In 2010 Central Bedfordshire Council, prompted by local activists concerned with the condition of the church, announced it would attempt to restore the Old Church and adopt it for use as a bothy on a regional walking trail. Those plans proved too expensive for the council; instead, in 2012 a new project was announced, which included stabilising the existing ruin and providing a viewing platform on the top of the tower, besides building a heritage centre next to the church.

== The Church of St Mary The Virgin ==
The Church of St Mary The Virgin
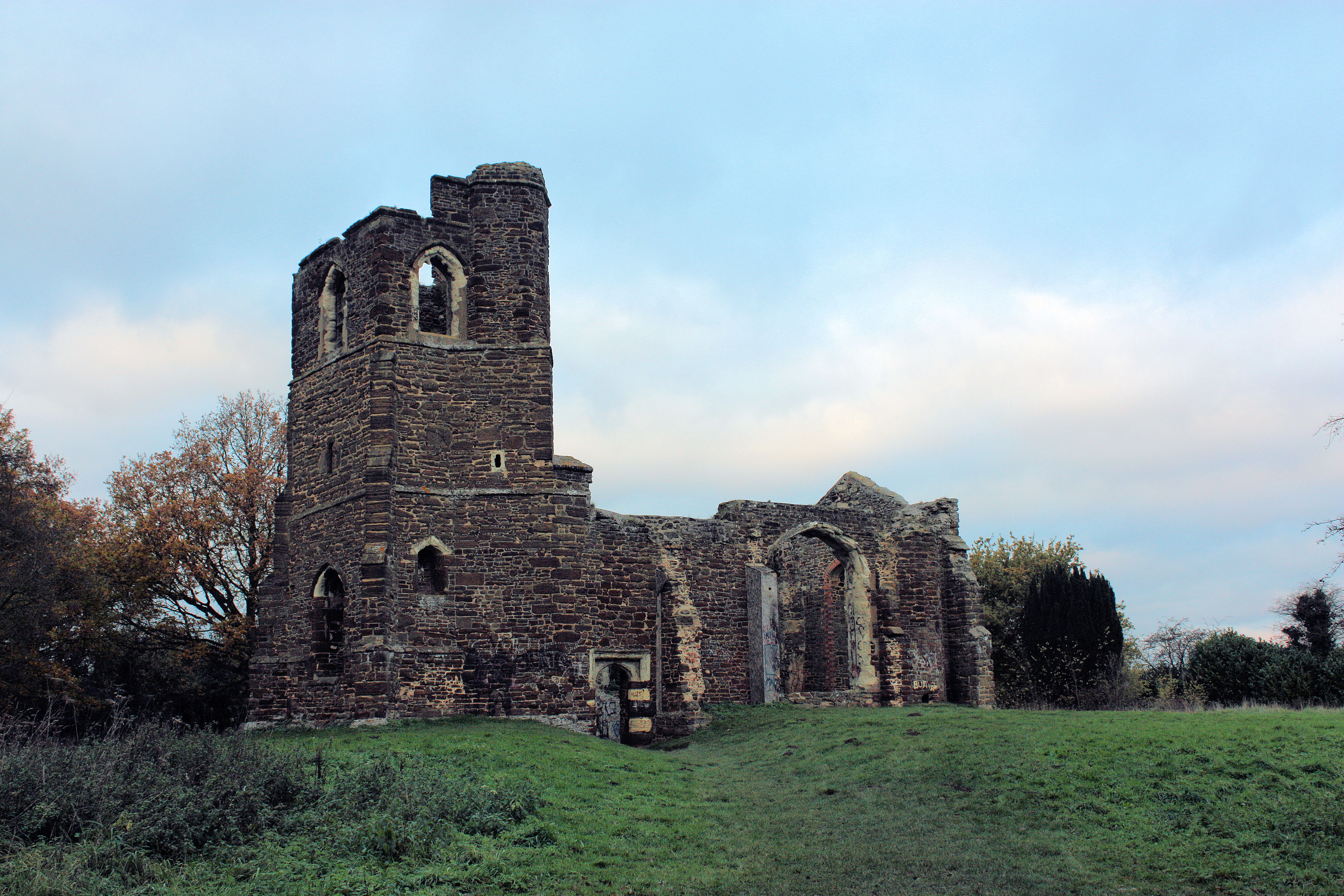
- The original church which fell into ruin in the 1950s
- Former names: The Old Parish Church
- Alternative names: St Mary's Church

General information
- Status: Redundant
- Type: Ruined church
- Location: Clophill, England
- Coordinates: 52.03733°N 0.40956°W
- Construction started: c. 1350
- Owner: Central Bedfordshire Council

The ruined church at the village edge is a Grade II* listed building, first listed in 1961 and formerly called The Old Parish Church, but later re-listed under the name The Church of St Mary The Virgin. It was probably built c. 1350. It was built in the Perpendicular style, the fabric being mostly of coarse ironstone rubble with ashlar dressings. William Henry Page, writing in 1908, dated the two-light windows of the belfry, the two-light west window, and the tower arch to the 15th century, and noted that the nave walls are older than the tower. Improvements were made in the early 19th century, with a west gallery added in 1814 and a new east end to the chancel in 1819. By the 1820s the church's seating capacity had become insufficient. Plans to enlarge it came to naught partly as a consequence of the rector falling ill. He died in 1843, and a new rector was appointed, who wanted to relocate the church to the village centre.

So instead, a new church was built (1848–1849) and the old one used, for a while, as a mortuary chapel for the graveyard, which remained in use. One of those uses, apparently, was extraordinary: according to the 1908 A History of the County of Bedford, vol. 2, edited by Page, "The churchyard possessed the unenviable reputation of being a haunt of body snatchers, and many human bones have been dug up in the fields of Brickwall Farm".

In 1854 the remains of the original church consisted of little more than the nave and tower. The chancel and the galleries had been removed in its conversion for use as a chapel, and several items (including the lych gate and two of the bells) had been transferred to the new building. Stephen Glynne in 1854 described it as "a poor, small church on top of a very high hill, having only a nave and tower, the chancel having been destroyed and the church is now wholly abandoned". In 1898, the church was described in Kelly's Directory for Bedfordshire, which said it "contains several interesting memorial tablets to the Rev. Charles Fletcher M.A., 1753, the Rev. William Pierce Nethersole, vicar of Pulloxhill, 1799, and another to members of the family of the Rev. Ezekiel Rouse: the roof is of ancient oak. The register dates from the year 1568".

Repairs were made in 1901, which ironically prevented Page (in 1908) from being able to date precisely the nave and tower. After the lead was stolen from the roof in 1956, however, the building fell into ruin.

=== 1960s desecration ===
In the 1960s the church became a focus of media attention after a widely reported incident of graveyard desecration was followed by a series of similar incidents, both at Clophill and across Britain.

On 16 March 1963, in a street in Clophill, a local couple saw two Luton youths playing with a human skull. The youths claimed that they had taken it from inside St Mary's, where they had discovered it stuck on a broken piece of window frame that had been jammed into a wall. On the floor were a breastbone, pelvis and leg bones laid "in the pattern used for the Black Mass", as it was described in newspaper reports of police statements. Scattered cockerel feathers and tracings of two Maltese crosses infilled in red, one newly done and the other somewhat weatherworn, were found inside the church. The rector at that time, Rev. Leslie Barker, reported that six graves of females had been tampered with before the stone slab above a seventh, that of Jenny Humberstone who had died in 1770 aged 22, had been dislodged and the coffin broken open. Barker, speaking to the press, stated that "Satan worshippers are known to always use a female at the centre of their ceremonies", and his churchwarden ascribed the damage to "some kind of devil worship". Similarly, police reportedly stated that, as animal sacrifice was commonly described in accounts of satanic rites, the cockerel was possibly "sacrificial", and the crosses were possibly painted with animal blood (although on this point Barker disagreed, thinking them more likely to be simply red paint). Author and researcher Bill Ellis, writing some years later, opined that the police's idea of a "sacrificial cockerel" had been derived from a scene in Denis Wheatley's 1934 novel The Devil Rides Out, where a black cock and white hen are sacrificed.

The remains of Jenny Humberstone were reinterred on 23 March, but the incident was not to be an isolated one, thanks to the newspaper publicity. Her grave was desecrated again on two occasions before 2 April, and the church had become a night-time attraction for local teenagers. Humberstone's grave was resealed but was reopened on the night of the following full moon, and there was a run on books about magic at Luton Central Library. The discovery of the heads of six cows and a horse in Bluebell Wood, Caddington, south of Luton, on 9 April was linked to the desecration at St Mary's, fueling further interest.

Around the time of the Bluebell Woods incident, a local newspaper interviewed a student from Silsoe Agricultural College who admitted to having visited the church in 1961 with a group of students, i.e. two years before the March 1963 incident at Clophill that saw the disinterment of Jenny Humberstone's bones. They had killed a cockerel, spread its feathers and blood around, and drawn a Celtic cross as "a huge joke" that "doesn't seem so funny now". Notably, these particular students didn't admit to opening any graves or exhuming any human bones.

Stories about St Mary's, and about Clophill in general, continued. The church and the reputation that it had gained from the incident were mentioned in a coffee-table book on witchcraft by the folklorist Eric Maple, who described "desolate Clophill" with a "wilderness of desecrated and looted tombs, symbols of the revival of black magic in the twentieth century", and recommended that people visit it for a "truly Gothic experience". Leslie Barker retired in 1969, and reported that since the first incidents in 1963 there had been numerous instances of graves being broken into "and some sort of rite performed".

The desecration of St Mary's in 1963 was followed by a spate of similar newspaper reports of "black magic rites" in churches in 1963 and 1964, including reports of a series of desecrations in Lancashire, symbols painted on the porch of a church in Bramber, Sussex, and a pentagram and a sheep's heart pierced with thirteen thorns in St Clement's in Leigh-on-Sea.

The incident was covered in the 2013 film The Paranormal Diaries: Clophill.

=== Transfer to BCC and future use ===
Central Bedfordshire Council (then Bedfordshire County Council) acquired the old church in 1977. The site continued to suffer from vandalism, as well as fly-tipping, under Council ownership. In 2010, local activism led to plans for the church to acquire a new function. It was proposed to convert it into a bothy to provide overnight accommodation for walkers on the Bedfordshire Greensand Ridge walk, with a full-time warden on site. However, there were concerns that the Council would not be able to afford the £75,000 that it would have to spend on such a project.

Instead, in 2012 English Heritage and Heritage at Risk agreed to fund restoration work on the church. The work, which was scheduled to start in 2013, has now been completed to include the stabilising of the ruin and putting in a gravel pathway inside the church; and restoring a spiral staircase and providing a viewing platform to allow visitors to climb to the top of the tower and observe the view. Currently the tower tours run daily at 10am and 2pm. Visitors may need to telephone ahead (there is a number to call at the site of the church) as the tours are run by volunteers. Further planned work will then include building a heritage centre next to the church building. The total cost of completing the project is stated to be £225,000, of which £75,000 is to be contributed by English Heritage and £100,000 by Heritage at Risk. The remaining balance of £50,000, to be used for the stabilisation and restoration, is to be funded by Waste Recycling Environmental Limited's Heritage Fund.

== St Mary's Church ==
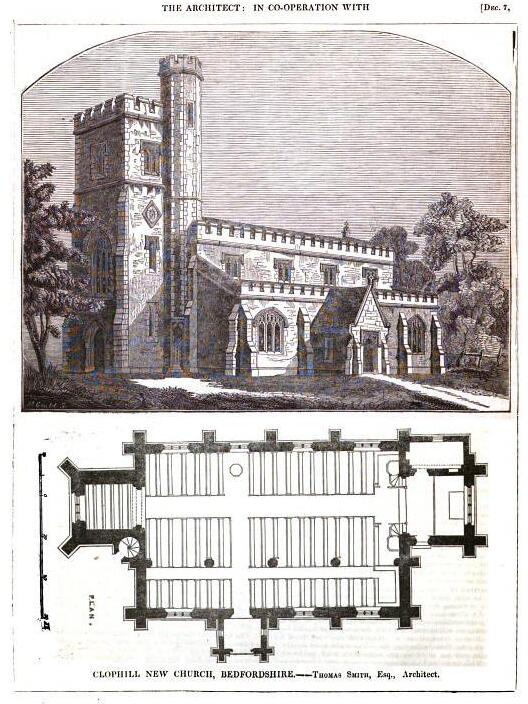
Architect's floor plan and engraving of the replacement church, published in The Civil Engineer and Architect's Journal in 1850.

The replacement church in the village centre, the current St Mary's Church, was built over the period 1848–1849. The lych gate was transferred there from the old church, as were two of the church bells, one made in 1623 and the other, a treble, made by Emerton of Wootton in 1774. A third bell, bearing only the initials "R.C.", was left behind in the old building. The parish church was officially transferred to the new building from what was then named the Church of St Mary in September 1850.

The architect in charge of building the new church was Thomas Smith of Hertford, who had also built the church at Silsoe. Built by Smith & Appleford of Pimlico, the Clophill church was constructed out of brown sandstone in rubble courses, with details in Portland stone. The nave was exactly 60 feet (18 m) long and 25 feet 6 inches (7.77 m) wide, with the aisle 12 feet 6 inches (3.81 m) wide. It had a gallery at the west end, an open tower that allowed a view of the west end window, and open uniform pews in the nave and aisle to accommodate 530 people. In total, with the exception of the south aisle and the sandstone that were donated by the then parish rector J. Mendham and Earl de Grey respectively, the building cost £2,300 (equivalent to £250,000 in 2025).

In May 1957, an additional bell was moved from the old church to the new by Whitechapel Bell Foundry, at a cost of £123. This was one of several removals from the old church that were performed as reaction to the theft of the lead from its roof the year before. The cross-beam from its roof, which Page in 1908 had described as "enriched with a vine pattern of sixteenth-century character" was moved to a new memorial Chapel of St Alban in the new building, which was consecrated on 17 June 1958 by the bishop who was then the Archbishop in Jerusalem (now the Anglican Bishop in Jerusalem). John Gedge, architect, of Bedford, drew up the plans for this new chapel, which involved reorienting the organ, as well as a new altar and altar rail, a new choir vestry, a new credence table, and a new prayer desk. The altar rail in the new chapel was made from new oak and an 18th-century staircase taken from old church.

Some years later, in 1964, dry rot was discovered in the roof of the new church. Chrystal & West, another firm of Bedford architects, drew up plans to remove the existing roof and clerestory, and substitute the steep pitched roof that remains today.

Kelly's Directory of 1898 noted that the church had been erected by public subscription and was "approached by a noble avenue of elms."

Today the parish church is part of the benefice of Campton, Clophill and Haynes, in deanery of Ampthill and Shefford, and the archdeaconry of Bedford.

== See also ==
Thundridge Old Church
