= Swan Hotel, Bedford =

Hotel in Bedford, England

Coordinates: 52.1350°N 0.4652°W

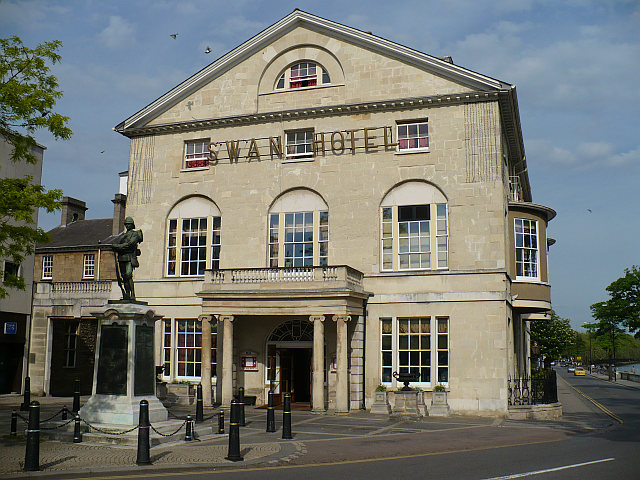
The Swan Hotel in 2008

The Swan Hotel is a historic coaching inn in the town of Bedford, in the ceremonial county of Bedfordshire, England. The building is located next to the Town Bridge over the River Great Ouse. Historically known as the Swan Inn, it was owned by the Dukes of Bedford. In the mid-1790s, the fifth Duke commissioned the architect Henry Holland to replace the older Swan Inn with a new Neoclassical building to serve both as a hotel and a political headquarters. The older staircase from the recently demolished Houghton House at Ampthill was rebuilt at the Swan. Like his predecessors, Bedford was a noted Whig magnate. The building was extended in the Edwardian era to the designs of Thomas Thurlow. It is now Grade II* listed.

In 1823 the tenancy of the Swan was taken over by Charles Higgins. By 1837 the successful management of the Swan allowed Higgins family to start the Castle Brewery nearby, also part of the Bedford estate around the ruins of Bedford Castle. Today the old brewery building serves as the The Higgins Art Gallery & Museum.

== Bibliography ==
- Pevsner, Nikolaus. Bedfordshire and the County of Huntingdon and Peterborough. Yale University Press, 2002.
- Stroud, Dorothy. Henry Holland: His Life and Architecture. Country Life, 1966.
