= Eggington =

Village in Bedfordshire, England

Coordinates: 51.9171°N 0.6096°W

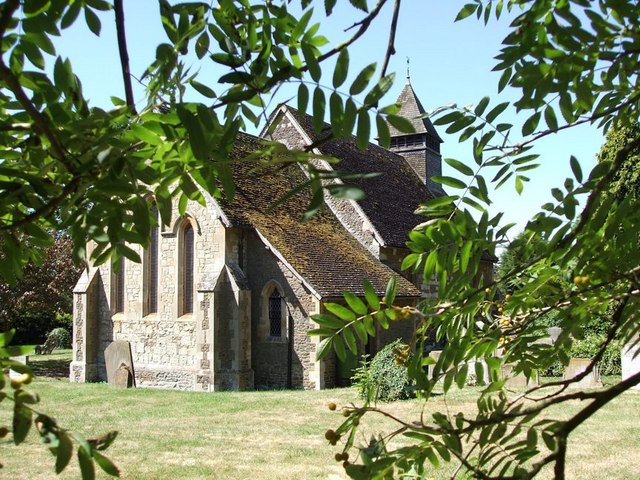
- Parish church of St Michael

- Location within Bedfordshire
- Population: 1,146 (parish)
- OS grid reference: SP956251
- Unitary authority: Central Bedfordshire
- Ceremonial county: Bedfordshire
- Region: East
- Country: England
- Sovereign state: United Kingdom
- Post town: LEIGHTON BUZZARD
- Postcode district: LU7
- Dialling code: 01525
- Police: Bedfordshire
- Fire: Bedfordshire
- Ambulance: East of England
- UK Parliament: South West Bedfordshire

Egginton – or Eggington as it is now known – is a village and civil parish in the Central Bedfordshire district of Bedfordshire, England, about three miles east of Leighton Buzzard.

Apart from the village itself, the parish also includes the hamlet of Briggington on the road to Leighton Buzzard, and the hamlet of Clipstone to the north of Clipstone Brook. The hamlet of Leedon was in Eggington parish, but became part of Leighton Buzzard when the parish boundary was redrawn in the early 1980s.

The village itself is relatively small – with some 190 residents living in 94 houses. It now has an Indian restaurant, a church and a village hall, formerly the village school (which closed in 1984). The Congregational chapel was pulled down in the 1970s: the village shop also closed in that era, and the old Methodist chapel was converted to a dwelling in 1988.

Nearby places are Leighton Buzzard, to the west, Hockliffe, to the east and Stanbridge to the south. At the eastern end of the village is Eggington House built in 1696. In the 1960s this was the home of Sir Gilbert Inglefield (a former Lord Mayor of London), then in 1978 it became the home of Lord Slynn of Hadley, the first English judge to move from the Queen's Bench Division to the Court of Justice of the European Community in Luxembourg, where he was one of six Advocates General. It is now in the private ownership of the Garrigue family and can be hired as a venue for wedding receptions, events and conferences.

The White House – a former parsonage in the village – was used to house the elderly blind who were evacuated from London for the duration of the Second World War. It was subsequently purchased by Bedfordshire County Council and became Children's Home between 1952 and 1983, since when it has become a private Care Home for the elderly.

The Three Horseshoes pub was eventually taken over by Louis Appert, who ran it as a rural French restaurant. This was replaced by Lavang – an Indian restaurant – in 2007. It was then purchased by Mr B. Choudhury who extensively renovated the property in 2011, adding an extension/function room to the property.

South of the village runs Eggington Brook, approximately three miles east of Leighton Buzzard.

In August 2021, the brook flood defences were upgraded by ECL Civil Engineering and Dr Andy Hughes, the reservoir dam consultant, to withstand a 1 in 100,000 projected annual flood with the new embankment dam to achieve an official Dam/Reservoir status.

Flood Protection is now in place for Leighton Buzzard and the surrounding area under the Reservoirs Act 1975.

Eggington is part of the political ward of 'Heath and Reach' which sends a Councillor to Central Bedfordshire Council. The ward includes the villages of Heath and Reach, Hockliffe, Eggington, Stanbridge, Tilsworth, Tebworth and Wingrave. The ward was created in 2011 and has since been represented by Councillor Mark Versallion.

Eggington was the home village of the British comedian and gameshow host Bob Monkhouse OBE (1928–2003).
