= Elstow =

Village in Bedfordshire, England

Coordinates: 52.1069°N 0.4648°W

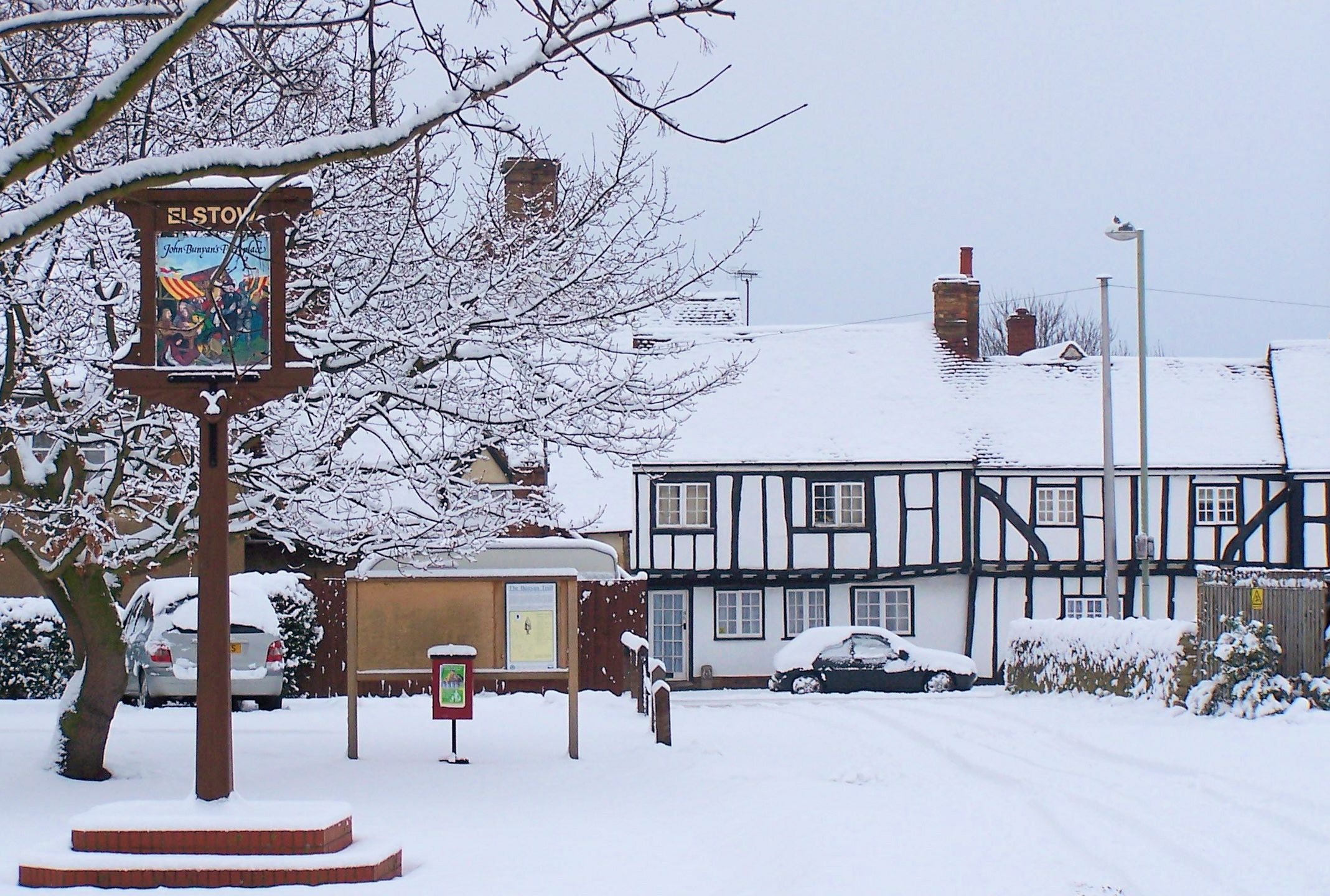

- Location within Bedfordshire
- Population: 2,702 (2011 Census)
- OS grid reference: TL052465
- Unitary authority: Bedford
- Ceremonial county: Bedfordshire
- Region: East
- Country: England
- Sovereign state: United Kingdom
- Post town: BEDFORD
- Postcode district: MK42
- Dialling code: 01234
- Police: Bedfordshire
- Fire: Bedfordshire
- Ambulance: East of England
- UK Parliament: Mid Bedfordshire

Elstow is a village and civil parish in the Borough of Bedford, Bedfordshire, England, about 2 miles (3.2 km) south of Bedford town centre.

== History ==
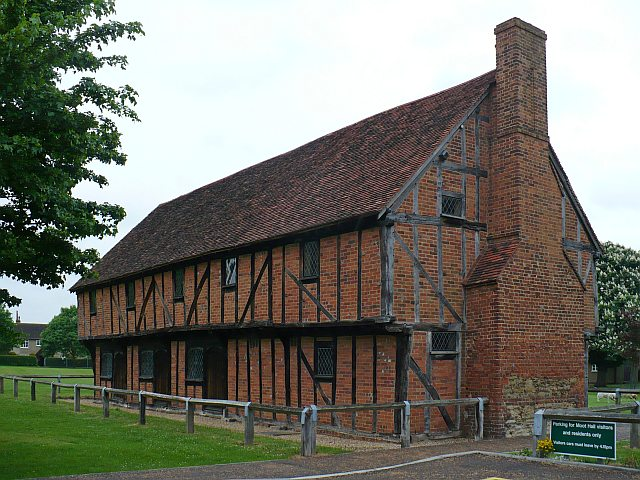
The Moot Hall

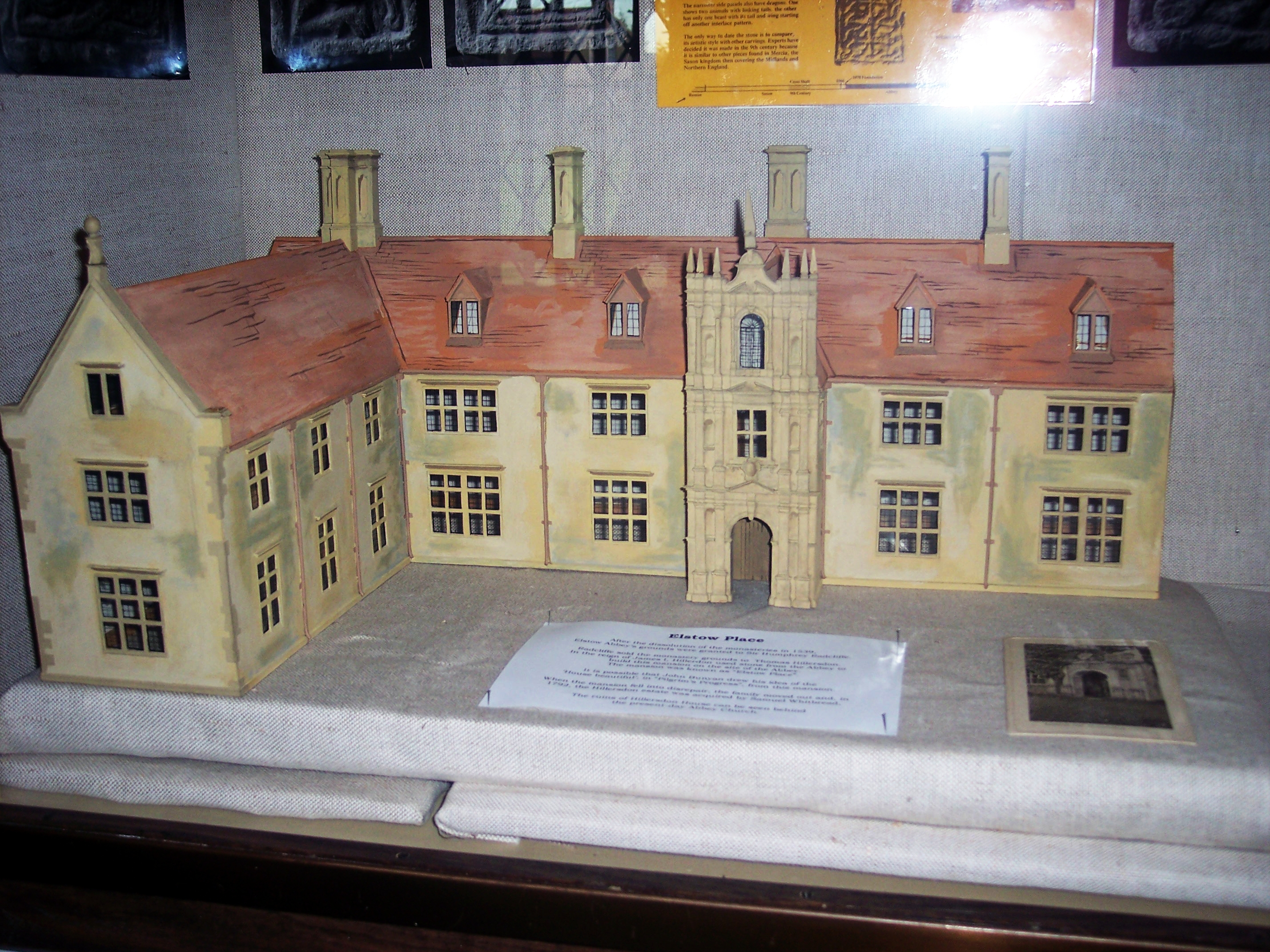
A model of Elstow Place

The Countess Judith of Lens, niece of William the Conqueror, founded a Benedictine nunnery in Elstow in the year 1078.

The Moot Hall, is an important example of timber frame construction, was built 1440-50 and extended sometime before 1539. From about 1810, it was used as a day school and a night school, until the Education Act 1872 lead to the building of a school in Elstow's High Street. From 1810 to 1910, Moot Hall was used as a chapel and Sunday school for the Elstow congregation of the Bunyan Meeting church. It is now a registered Ancient Monument and is used as a museum of 17th century life and as a small music events venue.

In 1538, Elstow Abbey was valued as being the eighth richest nunnery in England. On 26 August 1539, the Abbess surrendered the Abbey, the manor of Elstow and the Abbey's other lands and estates throughout England, to King Henry VIII, as part of his Dissolution of the Monasteries.

So large and significant was the Abbey at Elstow that, in the 16th century, Bishop Stephen Gardiner of Winchester sponsored a bill in Parliament to make it a cathedral for Bedfordshire, but this motion never received royal assent.

John Bunyan was born in 1628 at Bunyan's End, which lay approximately halfway between the hamlet of Harrowden and Elstow's High Street.

South of the village, a World War II munitions factory called ROF Elstow operated from 1942 to 1946, Author H.E. Bates wrote about it in The Tinkers of Elstow (1946).

== Elstow today ==
The village and most of the populated part of Elstow parish are located inside Bedford's southern bypass, with the hamlet of Harrowden lying just to the south-east of that road. The central part of Elstow is a conservation area, with many historic buildings and a village green.

Primary education is provided by Elstow School, with around 420 pupils on the roll.

== May Festivals ==
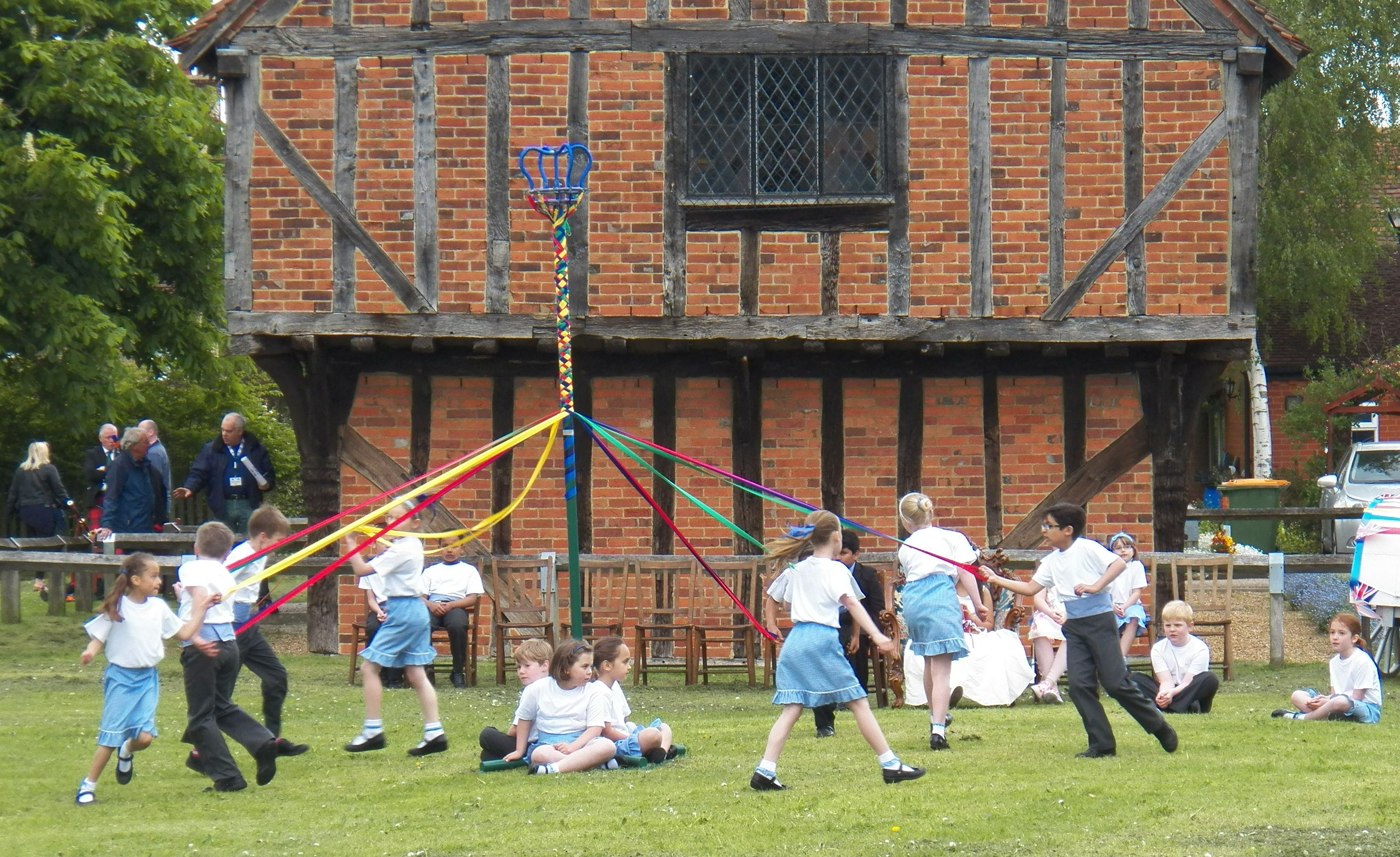
Elstow May Festival

May festivals are thought to have taken place in the village from long before the formation of the nunnery in 1078, possibly from pagan times. These were abandoned in about 1889 but then revived by the local headmaster, 'Bob' Wadsworth, in 1925. They were discontinued in 1968 and were then revived again in 2006 by the Reverend Jeremy Crocker, rector of Elstow Abbey.
