= Listed buildings in Podington =

Podington is a civil parish in Bedford, Bedfordshire, England. It contains 62 listed buildings that are recorded in the National Heritage List for England. Of these, three are listed at Grade I, the highest of the three grades, two are listed at Grade II*, the middle grade, and the others are at Grade II, the lowest grade.

== Key ==
Grade	Criteria
I	Buildings of exceptional interest, sometimes considered to be internationally important
II*	Particularly important buildings of more than special interest
II	Buildings of national importance and special interest

== Buildings ==
Name and location	Photograph	Date	Notes	Grade
Barn to South East of Hinwick Lodge; 52.24319°N 0.59786°W	—	1769	Coursed limestone rubble barn, topped by a later corrugated iron roof. A set of full height double doors adorn the building, alongside a date plaque in the gable end.	II
Stable Block to Hinwick Hall; 52.25164°N 0.63182°W	—	1908	The early 20th century stable block is constructed from coursed limestone rubble, with stone gable coping and a tiled roof. The building is laid out in a horseshoe shape around three sides of a courtyard. To the south elevation are a pair of segmental-arched carriage entrances, a set of four leaded casement windows, and a doorway. The other elevations have plainer windows, and the west elevation of the west wing has large projecting gables.	II
Parish Church of St Mary; 52.25427°N 0.62176°W		Medieval	The parish church is built of coursed limestone rubble with some use of Northamptonshire stone. The earliest elements, including the chancel windows, south and north aisles, and piscina date from the 13th century. The chancel itself is Norman, but heightened and had a parapet added in the 15th century, whilst the south aisle has 14th century-style Victorian windows and a 19th-century porch. Both the north and south aisles have 20th-century ironstone buttresses. The tower consists of two bottom stages of 13th-century origin, a 14th-century upper stage, and 15th century crocketed spire. In regards to the interior, the north wall of the chancel has a set of four arches that appear to be blocked tomb recesses, with the two inner having stops in the form of carved human heads, and the outer pair having finial decoration. A number of monuments to members of the Orlebar family are also present, whilst the nave's 15th century roof is supported by corbels decorated with heads of kings and queens.	I
Rosedean; 52.24376°N 0.63103°W	—	1790	A row of three houses, later converted into just two, with the east gable end bearing a datestone of 1790, and the west 1892. They are mainly of coursed limestone rubble, however a large part of the no. 6's south elevation has been reconstructed in brick. A corrugated iron roof tops the two storeys, with each house stepping down in height from east to west. The north elevation facing the road, has a single centrally-placed first floor window, whilst the ground storey below one three-light, two two-light, and a small fixed-light window. To the south elevation are nine ground floor windows, and seven first floor, mainly dating to the 20th century.	II
Hinwick Hall; 52.25149°N 0.63244°W		16th century	A small country house that was later remodelled in the early 18th century, before being extended and altered again in the early 20th century, leading to most identifiable original work being lost. It is constructed from coursed limestone rubble with ashlar dressings, with the two storeys and attics topped by red tile and Colly-slate roofs. Laid out in an L-plan, due to a large wing being added to the northwest end in the late 19th century. The east elevation serves as the front of the building, cornered with full-height Corinthian pilasters, and with a central projecting porch of two storeys under an attic, that is adorned with a doorway flanked by Corinthian pilasters and topped by a broken scroll pediment. A square weatherboarded turret stands on top of the porch, and is surmounted by an octagonal arcaded wooden cupola, topped by a ball finial and wrought iron weathervane.	II*
5 and 6 Gold Street; 52.25384°N 0.62325°W	—	17th to 18th century	Single storey coursed limestone rubble house, with a part-thatched, part-pantile roof, and a gable end facing the road. A rendered and pantile roof, single storey addition is present at the northeast end. The southeast elevation contains a pair of dormer windows, whilst a further three are present to the northwest elevation.	II
Entrance Gates and Gate Piers to Hinwick House; 52.24830°N 0.63003°W	—	c1710	Set at the entrance to Hinwick House, consisting of a pair of ashlar gate piers, each topped by a carved stone phoenix, with a set of contemporary wrought iron gates mounted.	II
Watts Cottage; 52.25215°N 0.61977°W	—	18th century	The coursed limestone rubble house was originally of two bays, however no has an additional bay to the south end. A thatched roof that is hipped to the south end sits atop the single storey dwelling. A pair of red brick gabled dormers with tiled roofs project from the main roof, underneath which a pair of windows flank a central doorway at the ground floor level.	II
Dovecote to Hinwick House; 52.24839°N 0.63162°W	—	17th century	A square dovecote of coursed limestone rubble construction with a red tile roof that is hipped below with a gablet above. The nestling boxes have all been destroyed.	II
25-28, High Street; 52.25377°N 0.62239°W		1680	Terrace of three houses with coursed limestone rubble walls and a thatched roof. The one storey block has a rear wing to the northeast end, and a set of three three-light windows adorning each floor, with the thatch being cut out around those at first floor level. Three doorways are set into the front elevation.	II
Church Farmhouse and Adjoining Barn; 52.25450°N 0.62219°W	—	Late 17th to early 18th century	Two storey house of coursed limestone rubble with a clay tile roof. A gabled timber porch sites on a stone plinth wall at the southeast elevation of the main block, whilst the southwest elevation has a further entrance with a pedimented bracket hood over. The barn sits at the southeast end, and is of stone, with a thatched roof and weatherboarded gable end.	II
Manor Farm Cottage and Manor Farm; 52.26196°N 0.64394°W		18th to 19th century	A range of houses of varying dates that were later converted into a single private dwelling, and now split again into two. Coursed limestone rubbles make up the two storeys, with a steeply pitched roof clad in concrete tiles to the north section, and shallower pitched roof in Welsh slate to the later south section. A pair of three-light casement windows adorn each floor.	II
3, Hinwick Village; 52.24346°N 0.63147°W	—	17th century	Coursed limestone rubble house underneath a corrugated iron roof that is laid over original thatch. The south elevation and east gable end of the single storey building are pebbledashed, and three 20th-century lean-tos are present to the south elevation.	II
Manor House; 52.26168°N 0.64445°W	—	Late 18th century	Three storey coursed limestone rubble house with a Welsh slate roof of two parallel gables accented by stone gable coping. The ground floor of the front elevation has a segmental-headed doorway flanked by a pair of sash windows, with a further three sash windows adorning both floors above. Flat-roofed stone extensions are present at the northeast and northwest elevations, whilst a small brick addition projects from the southeast end.	II
West Farmhouse; 52.24473°N 0.63139°W	—	Late 17th to early 18th century	The coursed limestone rubble house consists of a single storey and attics, and has an additional rear wing of 18th-century origin. The south wing has a clay tile roof with stone gable coping with three inserted gable dormers, whilst the rear wing is two storeys tall with a concrete tile roof and a pair of gabled dormers. Both wings contain a doorway with that to rear wing having a doorhead topped by a pent roof.	II
Fordlands; 52.24273°N 0.63180°W	—	Late 17th to early 18th century	A thatched roof, coursed limestone rubble house of two storeys. The front elevation contains two casement windows at first floor levels, with two further casements adorning the ground floor. A 20th-century porch topped by a clay tile roof projects out, and a rear wing sits at a right angle to the main block. This is a single storey tall, constructed from limestone rubble with a pantile roof, and has a 19th-century lean-to with a corrugated iron roof.	II
West Farm Barn; 52.24495°N 0.63138°W		18th century	Barn of coursed limestone rubble construction, topped by a corrugated asbestos roof, with a coped gable at the west end. A pedestrian archway with a brick surround leads through the building at the east end.	II
20-23, Gold Street; 52.25390°N 0.62291°W	—	17th century	A terrace of 17th-century houses, consisting of two storeys of coursed limestone rubble, with a thatched roof and stone coped gables. A single eyebrow dormer adorns the roof, and five casement windows line each floor.	II
Wellburn House; 52.25461°N 0.62600°W	—	18th century	The three storey house was later altered in the 19th century, with the original section consisting of three storeys of coursed limestone rubble under a Welsh slate roof with stone gable coping. Three casement windows adorn each storey, with those of the second floor being of later 20th century origin. A trellis porch with a gabled roof and bargeboards projects from the block. The additional wing is of only two storeys, and contains an entrance topped with a pedimented doorhood, alongside entablature supported on Ionic columns.	II
17, 18 and 19, Gold Street; 52.25399°N 0.62310°W	—	1858	A row of coursed limestone rubble houses, consisting of two storeys and attics under a concrete pantile roof that is pierced by a set of three 20th-century box dormers. All casement windows to the building are also of 20th-century origin, and two doorways are set into the building.	II
Quietways; 52.24363°N 0.63126°W	—	19th century	19th century house of two storeys, that is constructed from coursed limestone rubble with a Welsh slate roof. To the west elevation are four ground floor casement windows with slightly cambered stone arches, and a further three casement windows with timber lintels to the first floor. A 20th-century gabled porch is present to the front elevation also.	II
Cattern Barn; 52.25464°N 0.62269°W	—	Late 17th to early 18th century	Coursed limestone rubble barn with a thatched roof and stone gable coping to the southeast gable. A small four-light window is at the northeast elevation, and two doorways to the southwest.	II
Woodyard Cottage; 52.25354°N 0.62142°W	—	17th century	The single storey, 17th-century thatched house is of a coursed limestone rubble construction. A pair of eyebrow dormers interrupt the roof, and three further casement windows are set into the ground floor, alongside doorway overset with a gabled bracketed doorhood.	II
Outbuildings to Hinwick House; 52.24827°N 0.63076°W	—	19th century	A range of 19th-century outbuildings within the grounds of Hinwick House. These consist of stabling, cart sheds, and a tack room; all are of coursed limestone rubble and have Welsh slate roofs, less the west elevation of the most southerly building which has been partly rebuilt in red brick. The central block is the tallest, and is inset with four doorways topped by rectangular fanlights. A lower building to the north, is an open-fronted former cart shed that is now used as a garage; whilst the building to the south end has a gabled ridge louvre and fanlight-topped doorway.	II
Parsonage House; 52.26369°N 0.64124°W	—	1657	Formerly serving as the vicarage for the nearby parish church, it has been heightened and partly altered in the early 19th century, and has further 20th century modifications. Of coursed limestone rubble construction, the east section is a single storey topped by a steeply pitched concrete tile roof with stone gable coping, whilst the west section has been heightened to two storeys with a shallower pitched concrete tile roof also with stone gable coping, that have now been clad in concrete tiles. Two windows adorn each floor of both sections, alongside a centrally located door, and a clay-tiled lean-to extension at the west gable end.	II
The Old Barn; 52.26185°N 0.64424°W	—	Late 18th century	The late 18th century former barn adjoins and previously served Manor Farm Cottage. It has a Welsh slate roof over coursed limestone rubble walls, with a central full-height double doorway.	II
Gate Piers and Flanking Walls to Rear Entrance of Hinwick House; 52.24837°N 0.63045°W	—	19th century	Serving the rear entrance of Hinwick House, consists of a pair of gate piers constructed from roughly squared limestone blocks, each topped by a moulded cornice with stone cap and ball finial.	II
4, Hinwick Village; 52.24356°N 0.63144°W	—	18th century	18th century dwelling of coursed limestone rubble under an old clay tile roof with stone gable coping. The building consists of two storeys, the west elevation being adorned with 19th-century casement windows and a modern set of French doors, whilst the east elevation has a single casement window at ground floor level. A red brick lean-to with a corrugated iron roof projects from the north gable end.	II
Slade House; 52.24414°N 0.63157°W	—	Late 17th to early 18th century	The two storey house is of coursed limestone rubble and has a concrete tile roof with stone gable coping. A pair of 20th-century gabled dormers adorn the roof, and serve the attic. The east wing was added in the 19th century and is lower in height, although still two storeys in nature, and has a Welsh slate roof. Both the main block and additional wing similar style 20th century casement windows.	II
1-4, High Street; 52.25344°N 0.62296°W	—	1848	Previously a terrace of four houses, they have now been converted into only two, each of two storeys. Constructed from coursed limestone rubble with a concrete pantile roof. Eight cast iron honeycomb-pattern casement windows are present to the first floor, and below a further six windows and two entrances are present.	II
Old School House; 52.25392°N 0.62249°W	—	1841	Formerly a school house and now a private dwelling, the single storey coursed limestone rubble building is topped with a Welsh slate roof. A pair of semi-circular, arch-headed, three-light casement windows with timber mullions and stone drip moulds flank a central projecting gabled porch with stone gable coping a semi-circular headed doorway.	II
Former Dovecote at Church Farmhouse; 52.25482°N 0.62265°W	—	18th century	Constructed from coursed limestone rubble with a hipped clay tile roof, including a gablet to the apex with louvred ends. The nesting boxes have been covered up, and a 20th-century addition is present to the east elevation with double garage doors.	II
The Cottage and Nos. 29, 31 and 33; 52.25354°N 0.62235°W	—	1773	A pair of two storey houses flanking a slightly projecting pedimented section, containing a central pedestrian archway with a deep ironstone head. The building is constructed from coursed limestone rubble with ironstone dressings, underneath an old clay tile roof with stone gable coping. The windows are mainly of 20th-century origin. A cottage located to the southwest end is a later addition, however in a similar style.	II
36, High Street; 52.25388°N 0.62171°W		1757	L-plan house of a single storey, of coursed limestone rubble construction and topped with an old clay tile roof with stone gable coping and two dormer windows with pent roofs. A 20th-century bow-fronted shop window is present to the front, alongside a doorway.	II
The Old Vicarage; 52.25396°N 0.62149°W	—	1778	The building formerly served as the vicarage for the Parish Church of St Mary, however is no a private house. Originally laid out as a two-storey L-plan, later wings have been added to the rear, including a single storey extension with a gabled slate roof to the southeast wing, and a 19th-century addition with a hipped Welsh slate roof to the northeast. The building is entirely of coursed limestone rubble, accented by ironstone quoins, bands, and window heads. To the northwest elevation is a slightly projecting centre section, with pedimented sash windows set in the first floor.	II
The Turret, Hinwick House; 52.24777°N 0.63090°W	—	Early 16th century	The remains of an early 16th-century manor house that was present before the current Hinwick House; altered in the 18th century, it now serves as cottage accommodation. Coursed limestone rubble walls lay under a concrete tile roof with stone gable coping and moulded kneelers. The main portion is of two storeys, whilst a gabled wing projects to the rear of one storey, and a rectangular loggia to the front has three storeys. The turret is open-fronted to both the ground and first floor levels, and inside is a staircase with a balustraded landing. A clock is mounted to the front of the building and is dated 1710, and a hexagonal timber cupola with a lead roof and weathervane tops the turret.	II
The Keepers Cottage; 52.24493°N 0.63191°W		17th century	A coursed limestone rubble house, with a thatched roof sitting atop the single storey. A gable end faces the road, and a 20th-century timber porch is present, with a gabled clay tile roof.	II
The Old Wheatsheaf; 52.24376°N 0.63143°W	—	1753	Mid-18th century house that was later extended and re-roofed in the 19th century. It is constructed from coursed limestone rubble, with a steeply pitched roof clad in Welsh slate. The two storey building has a set of three casement windows to each floor at both the east and west elevation, alongside a gabled porch with crested ridge tiles and scalloped bargeboards.	II
K6 Telephone Kiosk Adjacent to Numbers 6 and 7; 52.24377°N 0.63117°W	—	c1935	K6 type public telephone kiosk as designed by Sir Giles Gilbert Scott. Consist of a square kiosk of cast iron painted in red, topped with a domed roof, and with unperforated crowns adorning the top panel on each face.	II
Jetty Cottage; 52.24423°N 0.63145°W	—	17th century	The 17th century cottage adjoins the rear of the also listed Slade House. A concrete tile roof with stone gable coping lays on top of two storeys of coursed limestone rubble. A number of 20th-century casement windows with glazing bars adorn the front elevation, alongside a gabled stone porch with stone gable coping and topped by a finial.	II
Park Farmhouse and Adjoining Barn; 52.24478°N 0.63077°W	—	1597	The earliest part of the farmhouse is dated 1597 at the west gable, however it was later extended and altered both eastwards in 1704, and in 1795 with a further wing projecting northwards. All parts of the building are of coursed limestone rubble and clay tile roofs with stone gable coping, although the later additions have previously been thatched. Of two storeys throughout, a doorway is present to the ground floor complemented by a trelliswork porch with decorated bargeboards. A 14th-century crocketed canopy head and small crocketed ogee-panelled head are also incorporated into the building, and fragments of re-used medieval masonry are present in the east wall. The barn is situated to the rear, dated 1750, and is of rubble stone construction with a concrete tile roof.	II
7, Gold Street; 52.25397°N 0.62332°W	—	Late 17th to early 18th century	A single storey coursed limestone rubble dwelling with a thatched roof. A pair of ground floor casement windows flank 20th century brick buttresses at the northeast elevation, a gabled porch is present at the northwest gable end, and a single storey pantile-roofed extension projects from the southeast gable end.	II
Knapwell Farmhouse; 52.25169°N 0.62008°W	—	Late 17th to early 18th century	Farmhouse constructed from coursed limestone rubble, with a concrete tile roof and stone gable coping finishing the two storeys and attic. Two hipped dormers sit on the south elevation, with two further windows on each of the floors below. A wing projects from the west end, with a 20th-century porch set at an angle in between the wings.	II
Mullion Cottage; 52.25382°N 0.62274°W	—	Mid-19th century	Coursed limestone rubble house with a Welsh slate roof, each of the two storeys has a pair of three-light windows, and a segmental-arched door with a square-headed opening is present to the ground floor.	II
Manor Farm Cottages; 52.25467°N 0.62005°W	—	18th century	A pair of single storey coursed limestone rubble cottages with a thatched roof.	II
Dovecote to Grange Farm; 52.26295°N 0.64384°W	—	Late 17th to early 18th century	The former dovecote is of coursed limestone rubble topped by a pyramid roof of old clay tiles. An open gablet is present at the apex.	II
Hinwick Bridge; 52.24971°N 0.63197°W	—	1779	Late 18th century coursed limestone rubble bridge with rubble stone gable coping to parapet. It consists of three arches divided by three orders, with carved human heads mounted on plain keystones.	II
Poplar Farmhouse; 52.25364°N 0.62273°W	—	1766	Having been extended and altered in the 19th century, the farmhouse is constructed from coursed limestone rubble, topped by a roof clad in Welsh slates to the front and clay tiles to the rear. Stone gable coping is present to the southeast end, whereas the northwest bay has bargeboards. The L-plan building has a set of four casement windows to each floor, and an entrance topped with a gabled and bracketed doorhood.	II
Stonehenge; 52.25434°N 0.62394°W	—	1849	Coursed limestone rubble house of two storeys under a Welsh slate roof. The limestone is accented by red brick modillion eaves, and each storey has a pair of cast iron honeycomb-pattern casement windows.	II
Church of St Michael and All Saints; 52.26378°N 0.64173°W		Late 12th century	Small late 12th century former parish church, now under the care of the Churches Conservation Trust. Its construction is of coursed limestone rubble with Northamptonshire ironstone dressings. It consists of a chancel and aisleless nave with the west tower built in to the west bay, shallow-pitched roofs, and 14th century windows. Inside, the chancel retains traces of wall painting.	I
Alderman's House; 52.26319°N 0.64280°W		1689	Although the main wing of the house was constructed in the late 17th century, to the northwest of the house, a late 18th to early 19th century wing of similar style was added. It is of coursed limestone rubble, with a concrete tile roof to the original wing, and Welsh slate to the later element. Two storeys in height, the southwest elevation has a bay window and gabled porch to the ground floor of the newer wing.	II
The Moorings; 52.24296°N 0.63179°W	—	17th century	A pair of houses; one of 17th-century origin, with an additional one to the south end added in the 19th century. Both are of coursed limestone rubble, with the earlier, one storey house being colourwashed and topped with a corrugated iron roof. The newer house is lower in height, however consists of two storeys under a concrete tile roof.	II
Gatepiers to Drive Entrance, Hinwick Hall; 52.24999°N 0.63221°W	—	c1700	A set of four rusticated limestone piers at the entrance to Hinwick Hall. The tower inner have modillion cornices, blocking courses and ball finials atop, whilst the outer are smaller and simpler. A set of 20th-century wooden gates are mounted at the entrance.	II
Hinwick House; 52.24773°N 0.63040°W		1708–14	A small country house of early 18th-century origin, with an additional large domestic wing added to the north side in c1860. The three storey early elements are of finely coursed limestone rubble with ashlar dressings, less the top storey which is of slightly different stone and style, hinting that it was potentially a slightly later addition. It is set with an order of Corinthian pilasters leading to a moulded cornice at the top of the first floor, from which Doric pilasters lead to a roof cornice and balustraded parapet. The main elevation is to the east, and contains a centrally located half-glazed door with a semi-circular fanlight, architrave surround and topped by consoles supporting a broken scroll pediment. The south elevation contains round-headed semi-circular niches that flank the central windows on both the ground and first floors, and large carved pediment sits in the centre of the upper storey. Two projecting additional wings are to the west, accessed through a central doorway surmounted by an arched hood on carved brackets. The aforementioned domestic wing is at the north side, consists of two storeys, and is of coursed limestone rubble with ashlar dressings. The east face of the roof retains its Welsh slate, whilst the west face is now clad in plain concrete tiles. A series of three parallel hipped roofs top the east face behind a parapet, with a recessed section inset with a projecting gable to the north of these. Breaking through the pediment is a central large stack.	I
Hinwick Lodge; 52.24338°N 0.59792°W	—	1770	Altered added to in the late 19th and early 20th centuries, the house was originally laid out as an L-plan over two storeys, however an additional wing of two parallel gables was added to the southeast end. A further flat-roofed extension was added to the centre of the main block at the turn of the century. It is constructed from coursed limestone rubble beneath an old clay tile roof with stone gable coping, with the later wing also being rendered. Three gabled dormers are present to the front elevation. To the southeast is a coursed limestone rubble bridge covered with a clay tile roof, that leads to the farm buildings.	II
1 and 2, Hinwick Village; 52.24345°N 0.63170°W	—	1682	A pair of coursed limestone rubble houses with clay pantile roofs. No. 1 is two storeys tall and has stone gable coping, moulded kneelers, three casement windows and a 20th-century circular window to the first floor, two casement windows to the ground floor, and an entrance door topped with a rectangular fanlight and flat doorhood. No. 2 is partly one storey and partly two storeys, with a 20th-century box attic dormer window rising from the roof of the single storey portion. A glazed door and 20th century window are present to the ground floor.	II
Rose Cottage; 52.24392°N 0.63087°W	—	18th century	The cottage is of coursed limestone rubble construction, laid out in an L-plan, with the main wing being of one storey, and the later rear wing having two storeys. A concrete tile roof now tops the building and a lean-to is present to the left hand side including a 20th-century shop window and doorway. The rear wing has 20th-century windows and doorway with brick surrounds.	II
Ivy Cottage; 52.24496°N 0.63251°W	—	18th century	Formerly a pair of two storey houses, the building now serves as a single dwelling. Constructed from coursed limestone rubble surmounted by a clay tile roof with stone gable coping. To the north elevation are a set of four casement windows to each floor, and to the south elevation is a single casement window to the first floor, and a 20th-century door and window to the ground floor. A one-storey lean-to with a clay pantile roof is set to the right hand side.	II
Grange Farmhouse; 52.26227°N 0.64374°W	—	Late 17th century	Two storeys of coursed limestone rubble arranged in an L-plan underneath a concrete plain tile roof, with stone gable coping and moulded kneelers. A set of paired ashlar chimney stacks project from the roof, a number of casement windows dot the exterior, and a 20th-century door is set into the southeast elevation.	II
Cottage 30 Metres South of Sycamore; 52.25303°N 0.62047°W	—	17th century	17th century house, a 19th-century two storey addition to the rear projecting wing. It is laid out in an L-plan, with the main block of a single storey, constructed from coursed limestone rubble under a thatched roof with stone gable coping to the southwest gable end, less the addition which is of red brick with a pantiled roof. A set of eyebrow dormers and matching casement windows below adorn the northwest elevation, whilst the southeast elevation has a single eyebrow dormer and two ground floor casement windows. A doorhood is set into the angle between the wings.	II
Garden Entrance Gates, Hinwick Hall; 52.25126°N 0.63199°W		18th century	A set of 18th-century wrought iron gates with supporting flanking pilasters and side screens. The central gate is inset with scrollwork and is surmounted by a scrollwork overthrow that is decorated with waterleaves and flat nibs, whilst the side gates have plain verticals with ribbon end scrolls to both the top and bottom. The pierced pilasters flank the gates, lead onto side screens, and then another set of pilasters.	II*
32-35, High Street; 52.25374°N 0.62195°W		1694	A terrace of houses that were created in 1759 by extending No. 34, which is of late 17th-century origin. They are built from coursed limestone rubble and have a thatched roof with stone gable coping to the southwest gable end. One storey throughout, a series of five dormer windows are sat below the eaves level and serve the further attic storey. A series of six casement windows line the terrace, and an additional 19th century cast iron window has replaced the original doorway of no. 34. A large chimney stack also serves no. 34.	II
