= Diana Astry =

English diarist and compiler of recipes

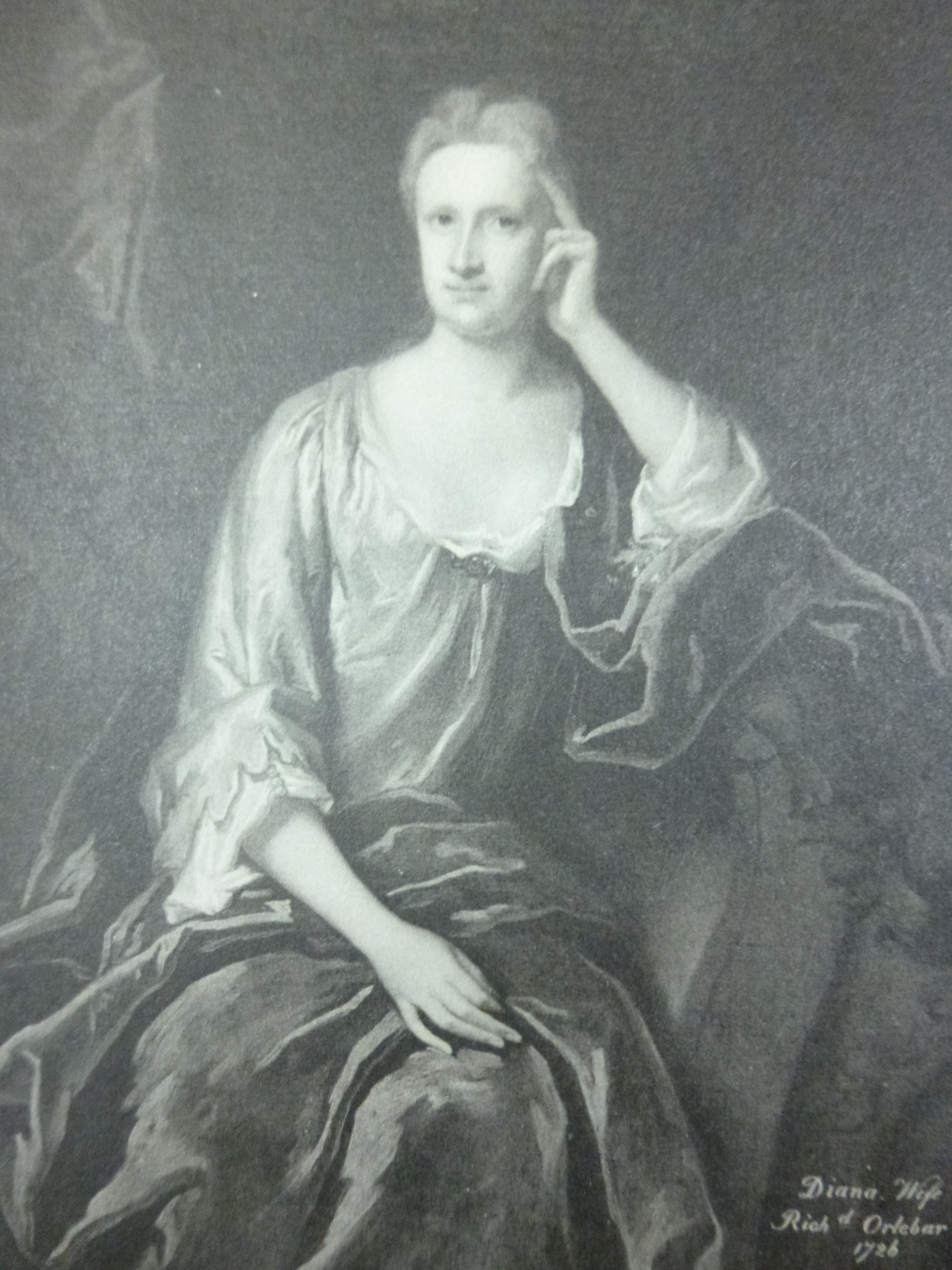
- Born: Diana Astry
- Died: 4 December 1716; Podington, Bedfordshire, England, UK
- Spouse(s): Richard Orlebar (m. 1708–1716; her death)

Diana Astry (baptized 2 January 1671 – 4 December 1716) was an English diarist and compiler of a recipe book containing 375 recipes acquired from a number of sources including family and friends.

== Biography ==
Astry lived at the Great House, Henbury, Gloucestershire, with her parents, Sir Samuel and Lady Elizabeth Astry, and her siblings, Elizabeth, Ann, Arabella, Luke and St John. Her father died in 1704, and in 1707, when their widowed mother married Sir Simon Harcourt, Diana Astry and her sister Arabella moved to Pendley, Hertfordshire.

In 1708, Astry married Richard Orlebar. She was an heiress with a fortune of £7000 who inherited even more money when her mother died 20 days after the wedding. The couple moved back to Henbury until the completion of their home, Hinwick House at Podington in Bedfordshire, in 1714. Diana Orlebar died childless two years later. Richard Orlebar, who was High Sheriff for Bedfordshire in 1720, was buried beside his wife in St Mary the Virgin, Podington when he died in 1733.

== Recipe book and notebook ==
Most of the 375 recipes Astry collected, before and just after her marriage, are of a practical nature, including general culinary, pickling, preserving, and medicinal entries. The sources of the recipes and tips are acknowledged and reflect not only the lifestyle of the upper middle classes in England and housekeeping knowledge required to run a country house, but also Astry's wide circle of influential friends and acquaintances.

The book includes recipes for 239 food dishes, 52 wines or cordials, 21 medicinal remedies, 25 pickles and 38 preserves. Among the sources mentioned are: Lady Drake, Lady Churchill, Lady Holt, Lady Torrington (whose recipe for "orange water" included "2 leaves of gold"), Lady Terret, Lady Chick(h)eley and Lady Fane. Where only initials have been recorded, the source may be a housekeeper; like the Orlebars’ Hannah French. Three men have contributed recipes: Mr Clark – "To make red strake sider"; Captain Rider – "An orange pudding"; and Dr Culpeper – "Dr Stephens' water (for use in childbirth)". Culpeper's recipe was one of many for "Dr Stephens' water" circulating in seventeenth-century texts.

Astry's vellum-bound recipe book is mostly written in her hand, although the writing deteriorates towards the end and a few recipes are written by another. The recipes are not in any particular order though there are more medicinal recipes towards the end, including for the plague and dog bite. The cordial with more than 80 herbs and spices "will cost 50 shillings a quart to make it".

"Her recipes are vague as to quantity...and timing...and rich in content. A good soup is made with a leg of beef, veal, mutton, a cock, lean bacon, a pigeon, cheese, ginger, mace, cloves, onions, carrot, turnip, horseradish, anchovies and sweet herbs". A venison pasty takes a side of venison, 14lb of flour, 6lb butter, 10 eggs + 6 whites. There are recipes for freshwater fish: carp, pike, eels, lamprey and tench. Sugar of various grades e.g. brown sugar candy, white sugar candy, brasile sugar, refined sugar, double refined sugar, is used for sweetening. Honey is mentioned in only three recipes for mead. There is a recipe for catchope/ catchop/ ceachup (ketchup) utilising white wine vinegar, 6 anchovies (‘unwasht’), cloves, mace, bay leaf, bunches of rosemary and sweet marjoram, and a little balm, to be coloured with claret. Alebaster (alabaster) was used for fining elder wine. Red hot brass farthings were put in white wine vinegar with salt to make a solution to green any sort of pickle. A powder of earthworms is recommended "for the yellow jaunders (jaundice)".

Astry's vellum notebook/ pocket book, dated 1706, contains a record of meals eaten at various dinner parties and venues (1701–1708) and a note of her weight as 4 score and 14 lbs (6 stone 10 lbs) on 8 October 1705. In her 2003 book The British Housewife, Gilly Lehmann comments that "There is not much evidence of French dishes in this notebook" even though "Astry's own collection of cookery receipts contained many fricassees and raggoos". She considers that at "a supper in London in 1706" where the dishes were "set on the table one at a time, imposing the order of consumption, was worthy of notice. She also notes that this supper started with a sweet posset".

== Personal life ==
Diana and Richard Orlebar did not have any children. In 1709, Simon Harcourt wrote to Richard Orlebar "hoping to hear the young ffox hunter thrives apace, & that you’l soon have occasion to demand my promise of making it a Christian" (being godfather).

In 1710, after believing she was pregnant, Diana Orlebar wrote to her sister Elizabeth about her longing for a child. Of Diana Astry's three sisters, Elizabeth (died 1715) married Sir John Smyth (Smith) of Long Ashton, Anne (died 1703 in childbirth) married Thomas Chester IV of Knole, and Arabella (died 1722) married Charles William Howard, 7th Earl of Suffolk.
