= Santa Pod Raceway =

Drag racing venue in Bedfordshire, England

Coordinates: 52°14′18.43″N 0°35′43.56″W

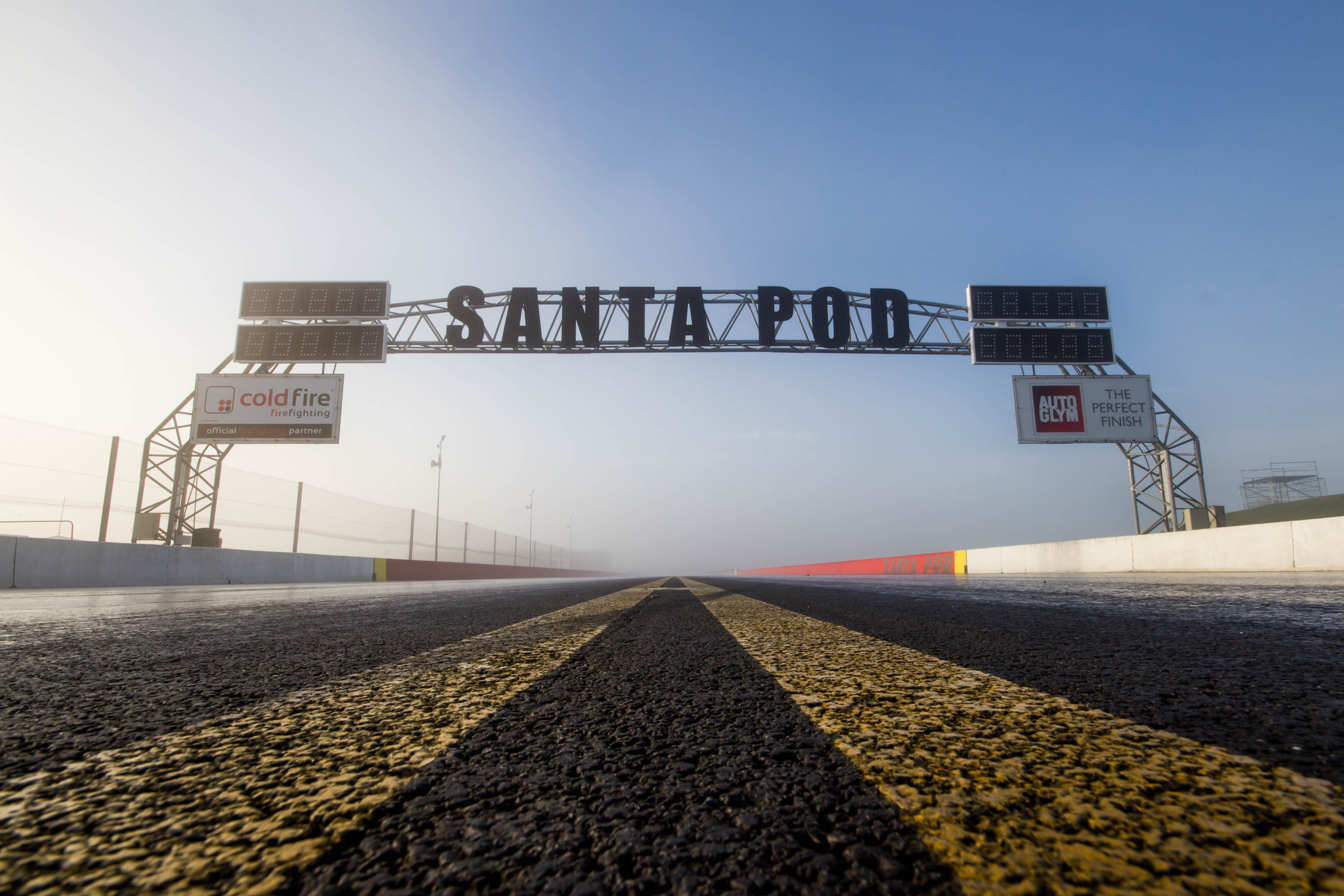
- The finish line gantry at Santa Pod Raceway
- Location: Podington, Bedfordshire, England
- Operator: Trakbak Racing
- Major events: FIA European Drag Racing Championship; FIM European Drag Racing Championship; British National Drag Racing Championships
- Website: https://santapod.co.uk

Dragstrip
- Surface: Concrete (from 2018)
- Race lap record: 03.58 seconds (Sammy Miller, Vanishing Point Rocket, 1984, Funny Car)

Santa Pod Raceway is Europe's first permanent drag racing venue for 1/4 mile (1,320 ft; 402 m) and 1/8 mile (660 ft; 201 m) racing. Located in Podington, Bedfordshire, England, the drag strip was built on a disused Second World War Royal Air Force (RAF) airbase, known as RAF Podington, once used by the USAAF's 92nd Bomb Group. The drag racing venue opened on Easter in 1966, and it is now the home of European drag racing and hosts both the first and last round of the FIA and FIM Europe European Drag Racing Championship, along with the British National Drag Racing Championships. It has also been the venue for the annual Bug Jam weekend since 1987.

== History ==
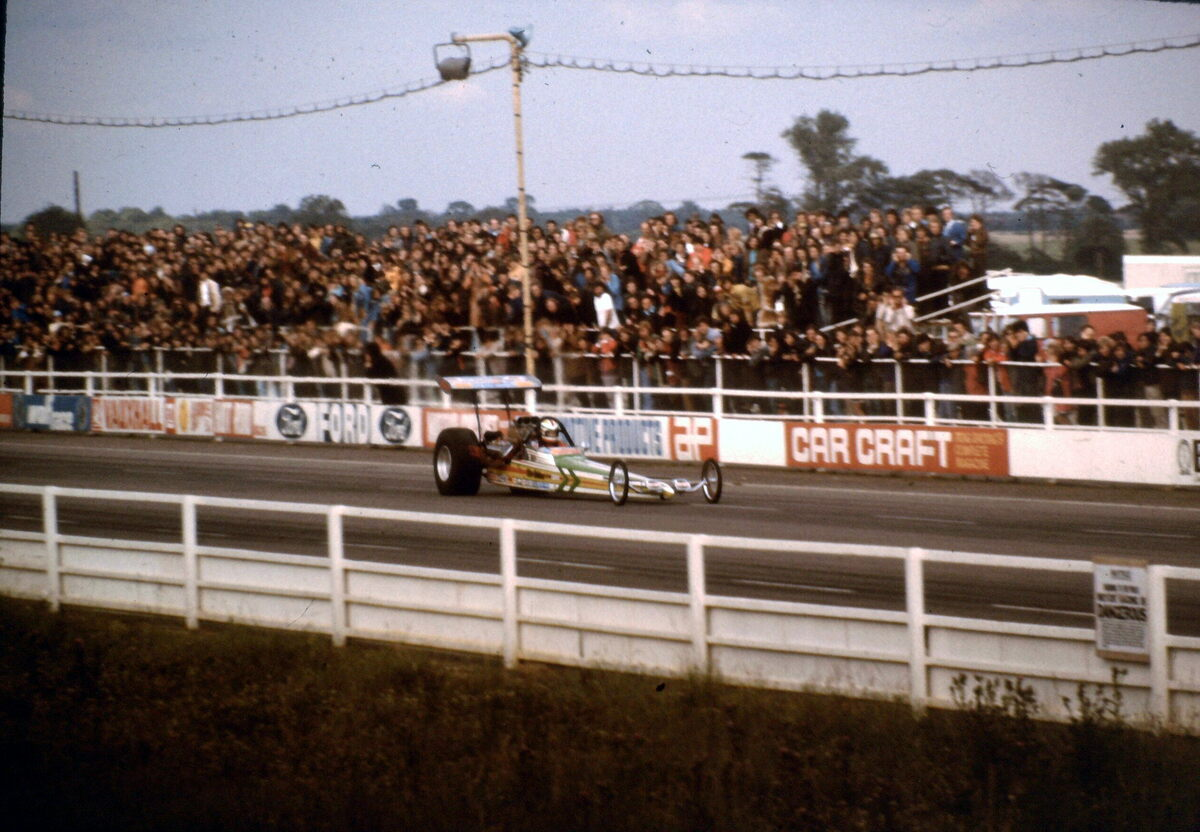
Clive Skilton's Revolution IV at Santa Pod, July 1973

Podington airfield, near the villages of Hinwick and Podington, was formerly a Second World War airbase. In 1966, permission was obtained to use the airfield as a drag racing complex, the 3/4 mile (4,000 feet; 1.2 kilometres) main runway being used as the drag strip. Santa Pod was named after Santa Ana Drags, a drag strip in California, USA, and the local village of Podington. Since then, the name Santa Pod has become synonymous with the sport of drag racing in Europe.

Informally known as 'The Pod', today the raceway hosts events throughout the year, including the FIA European Drag Racing Championships and the 'Run What You Brung' (RWYB) events where anyone with a valid driving licence can put their own vehicles and skills to the test. This also serves as a 'grassroots' recruitment ground, as many who start by running their road vehicle on the track for bragging rights progress to the next level and become competitors in national events after obtaining a licence from one of the official sanctioning bodies, Auto-Cycle Union or Motorsport UK.

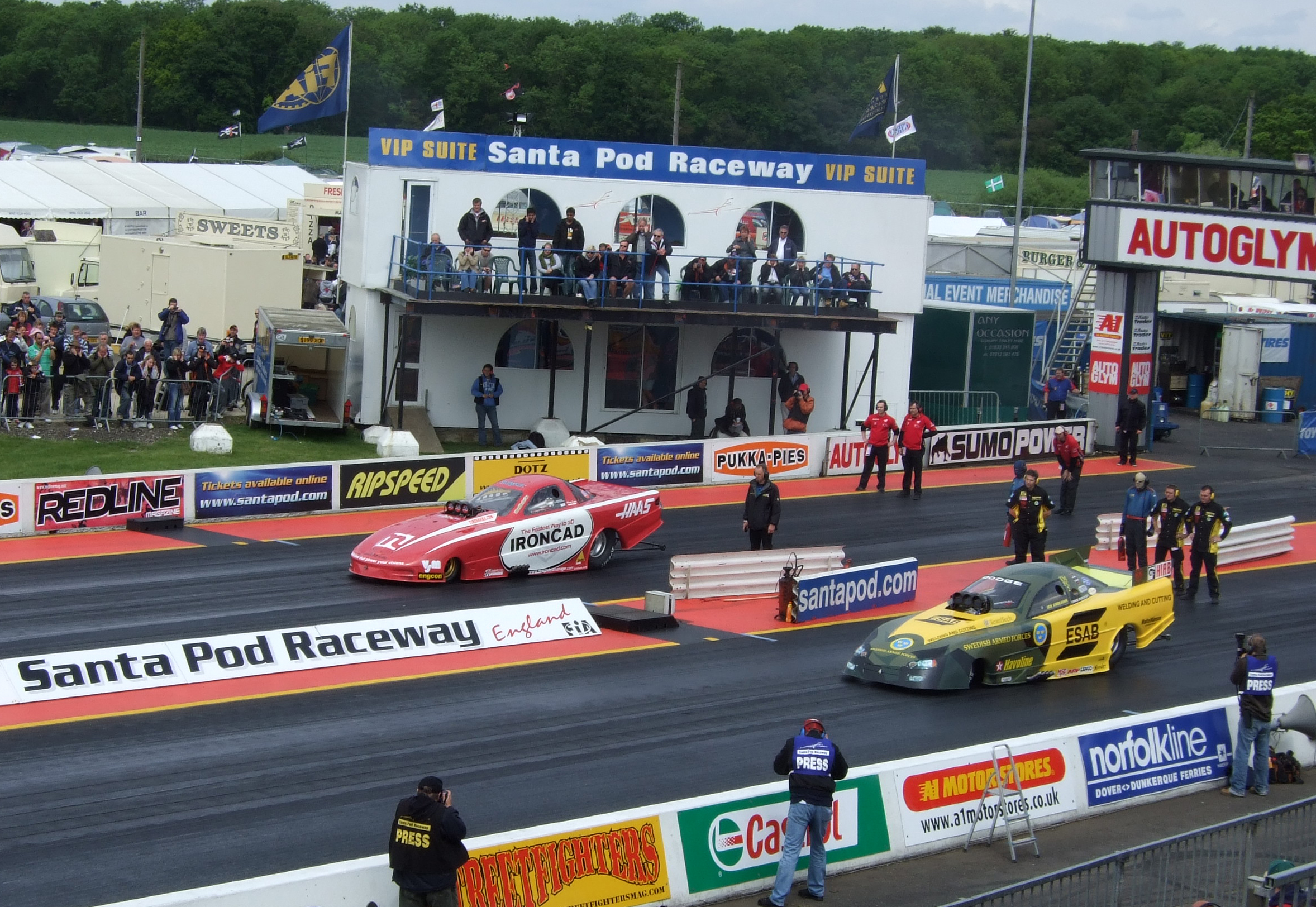
Starting line in 2007

Santa Pod is the venue at which the current world drag racing record, a time of 3.58 seconds at 386.26 miles per hour (621.63 kilometres per hour), was set by Sammy Miller in his Vanishing Point rocket-propelled funny car in July 1984. The world's fastest jet car (notably Santa Pod's 'resident') Fireforce 3, piloted by Martin Hill, broke the record at Santa Pod on Easter 2005 with a terminal speed of 336.10 miles per hour (540.90 kilometres per hour). Several other European drag racing records have been set, along with records unsurpassed outside the United States. In May 2010, Top Fuel dragster driver Urs Erbacher set a class speed record with a terminal speed of 314.87 miles per hour (506.73 km/h) reached in less than 5 seconds. At the same race meeting, Eric Teboul set a time of 5.2321 seconds at 249 miles per hour (400.73 km/h) on his Hydrogen Peroxide Rocket Bike, which he further improved to 5.19 seconds at the European championships in September 2010. In 2012, drag-racer Andy Frost set the record of 'the world's fastest accelerating road-legal car' at the UK's Santa Pod Raceway. In September 2010, 47-year-old Briton Perry Watkins drove a racing vehicle, a 1994 Reliant Scimitar Sabre, decorated as a formal Queen Anne style dining table, complete with tablecloth, chairs, place settings, food and various vessels. The vehicle was dubbed the 'Fast Food'. It performed two runs at Santa Pod, topping out at 130 miles per hour (209.21 km/h) and achieving an average speed of 113.8 miles per hour (183.14 km/h).

Santa Pod for many years remained the fastest all-asphalt dragstrip in the world, since most North American tracks are partially or entirely concrete in construction. However, during the winter of 2017/2018, the entire length of the track was lifted and replaced with a track constructed entirely in concrete, the reasoning being that concrete gives more consistent times, as it "moves around less" than asphalt.

Since 1987, the venue has hosted the annual Bug Jam weekend.

== In popular culture ==
Santa Pod appears in Led Zeppelin's concert film The Song Remains The Same. Drummer John Bonham drove a dragster at the raceway for his fantasy sequence in the film.

Santa Pod was also featured in a recurring segment of the British TV series Vroom Vroom.
