= Church of St Mary, Podington =

Grade I listed church in Bedfordshire, England

Coordinates: 52.2543°N 0.6218°W

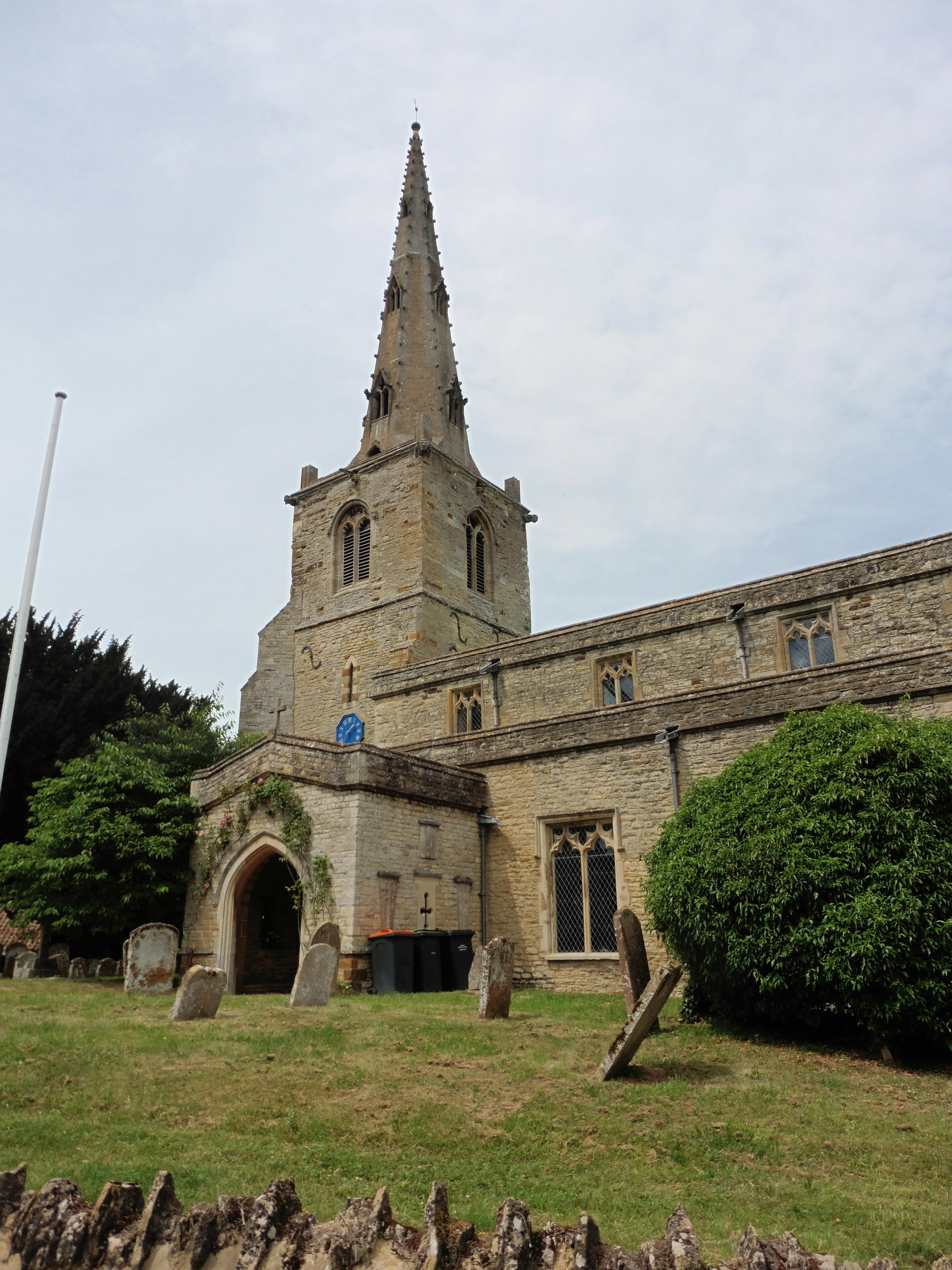
St Mary the Virgin church

Church of St Mary, also known as St Mary the Virgin, is a Grade I listed church in Podington, Bedfordshire, England. It became a listed building on 13 July 1964, (List Entry Number: 1321514). The National Grid Reference is SP 942 627.

Surviving architectural elements date back at least to the early 13th century. A 1912 report about the church indicated that it had a chancel, nave, north aisle, south aisle, south porch, and west tower. The south arcade of the nave, the north arcade, the chancel, and the tower were all dated to the 13th century. There were four bells in 1912, dating from 1609 to 1618. The leaning spire was built in the 14th century but was modified in the 14th and 15th centuries. It was in danger of collapse but was restored in the 19th century.

During the reign of Henry II, the church was part of the endowment to the Canons Ashby Priory by Stephen la Leye. During the Dissolution, it became Crown property. In 1545, the advowson was granted to Daniel Payne. The church is the final resting place of Richard Orlebar, the High Sheriff of Bedfordshire (died 1733) and his wife the culinary writer Diana Astry (died 1716), who had owned Hinwick House.

The pipe organ was restored by the 92nd Bomb Group Memorial Association. The 92nd group had been stationed at the RAF Podington airfield during WWII and flew nearly 300 operational missions from that base.

== See also ==
- Grade I listed buildings in Bedfordshire
