= Podington Castle =

Castle in the United Kingdom

- Podington, Bedfordshire, England

Site information
- Type: Castle
- Condition: Earthworks

Location
- Shown within Bedfordshire
- Coordinates: 52.2562°N 0.6199°W
- Grid reference: grid reference SP943629

Podington Castle, sometimes known as Puddington Manor Farm, was an 11th-century castle in the civil parish of Podington, in the county of Bedfordshire, England.

It was a Motte and triple bailey castle, surrounded by a moat, mentioned in the Domesday Book of 1086 as being owned by Hugh the Fleming. The castle was in ruins prior to the early part of the 17th century, when a new Podington Manor, now referred to as "Old Podington Manor", had been built just forward of its location. The new Podington manor became a farmhouse in 1694, when the owners moved their residence elsewhere.

The extensive earthworks remains of the castle can still be located, on the mound, in the field at the back of Old Podington Manor. Building foundations were still visible as of 1972.

== See also ==
- Castles in Great Britain and Ireland
- List of castles in England
