= Hinwick =

Hamlet in Bedfordshire, England

Coordinates: 52.24380°N 0.63290°W

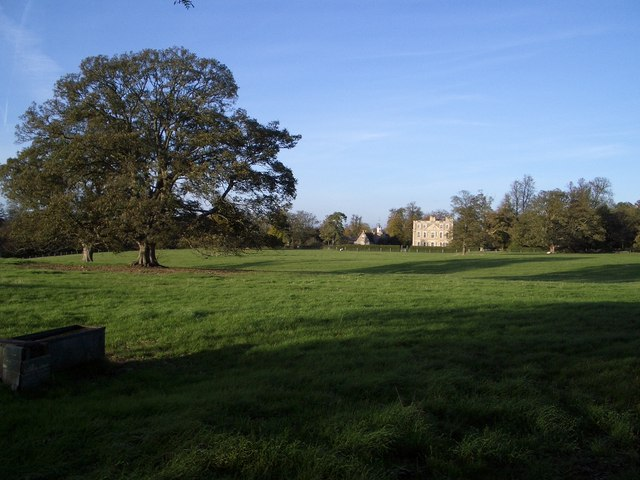
- Hinwick House and parkland

- Location within Bedfordshire
- OS grid reference: SP932615
- Civil parish: Podington
- Unitary authority: Bedford
- Ceremonial county: Bedfordshire
- Region: East
- Country: England
- Sovereign state: United Kingdom
- Post town: WELLINGBOROUGH
- Postcode district: NN29
- Dialling code: 01933
- Police: Bedfordshire
- Fire: Bedfordshire
- Ambulance: East of England
- UK Parliament: North Bedfordshire

Hinwick (/ˈhɪnɪk/ HIN-ik) is a hamlet in northwest Bedfordshire, England, United Kingdom; it is around nine miles north west of Bedford and is about 1 km (0.62 mi) east of the county border with Northamptonshire which is also the postal county. The hamlet is in the parish of Podington, which is sometimes called "Podington and Hinwick" and this parish was within the Hundred of Willey. Hinwick was recorded in the Domesday Book in 1086 as Haneuuich, also spelt Heneuuiche or Henewich and has also been recorded as Henewic and Hynewyk from the 13th century. In 1086, the population consisted of 19 households under six owners.

The area had been inhabited for centuries by that time. Paleoliths (stone tools) have been found and there is an indication that Bronze Age cinerary urn was also found. Some evidence of Roman habitation was also discovered including pottery, building materials and animal bones.

Today Hinwick is within the electoral ward of Harrold which is in the Borough of Bedford. Located around two miles south east of Hinwick are RAF Podington and Santa Pod Raceway.

At the cross roads, to the north side of the hamlet is Hinwick House, a manor house in its own 36 acres of grounds, built in 1709–14; its Victorian wing was added in 1860. The house is Grade I listed; it was extensively restored in 2014–2016.

Hinwick Numbers 1 and 2 (two houses) are Grade II listed, (Entry Number: 1114355). They were built around 1682 but modified since that time.

According to the 2015/2016 Hinwick Conservation report, the community has changed significantly over the centuries, from primarily agricultural "to a predominantly residential commuter village". Some historically significant buildings remain however, including Park Farm House, West Farm House, the barn at West Farm, the Old Wheatsheaf and the Keepers Cottage.

Less than one mile north north east along the main road is the village of Podington. Other nearby villages include, Farndish to the north and Wollaston to the north west, both just within two miles and also Bozeat around two and a half miles south west. The centre of the larger town, Rushden, is around three and a half miles north north east.

== See also ==
- Hinwick House
