= Hinwick House =

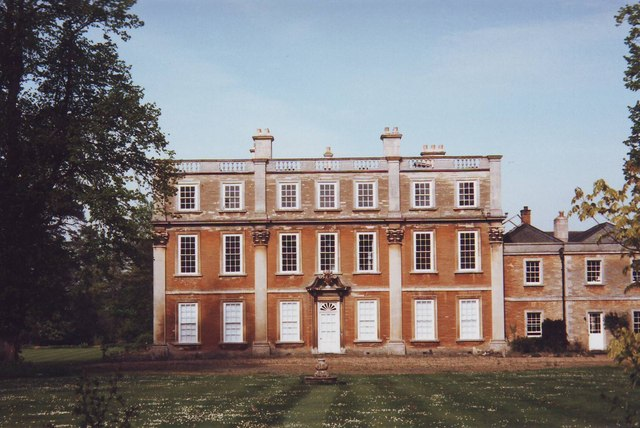
- Interactive map of the Hinwick House area

General information
- Type: Manor house
- Location: Hinwick, Bedfordshire, England
- Coordinates: 52.248°N 0.631°W
- Construction started: 1706; 320 years ago
- Completed: 1710; 316 years ago
- Renovated: 1992; 34 years ago, 2015; 11 years ago
- Owner: The Singh Family
- Landlord: Owner

Technical details
- Floor count: 3

Listed Building – Grade I

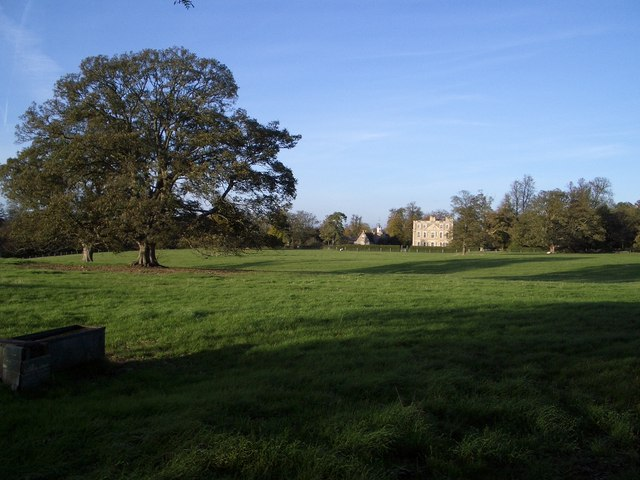
Hinwick House and parkland

Hinwick House is a Grade I-listed Queen Anne country house located about 90 minutes from Central London, near Podington in North Bedfordshire. The estate consists of the Queen Anne main house, the Victorian wing, the Victorian wing extension, garage block, stables, three cottages attached to a clock tower, a walled garden and a period dovecote. The house and estate has a total of 50 rooms. Hinwick House underwent a two-year restoration programme that concluded in 2016.

The house stands in its own park of about 38 acres (150,000 m^{2}) on the west side of the road from Podington and to the south of the Wollaston Road, from which the house is approached along a drive. At the end of which are wrought-iron gates with stone piers surmounted by collared eagles' heads with wings displayed, the crest of the Orlebar family by whom the house was built. At some time in the past, four soldiers were murdered; some say the house is haunted by their ghosts, since the soldiers were buried under the structure.

== History ==
Standing to the north of the hamlet of Hinwick, Bedfordshire, England, the property and a manor, known as Brayes Farm, was owned by William Payne since 1617. After his death in 1624, various relatives owned the estate. By 1709, his great-grandson, Richard Orlebar, was the owner and he decided to erect a massive new home for himself and his wife, the culinary writer Diana Astry. The house was modeled on Buckingham House, which, after later modifications, became the monarch's residence, Buckingham Palace. The architect was John Hunt of Northampton. Construction started in 1709 and some work continued until 1714 when the home was occupied; the cost was just over £3,848.

Between 1859 and 1860, Richard Longuet Orlebar modified the dining room and drawing room; he also added the Victorian north wing. For a time, Orlebar also owned a nearby house, Hinwick Lodge. The 1901 census records that Augustus S Olebar was Headmaster of a Preparatory School based at the house where the boys also boarded. A report from 1912 indicated that the owner of Hinwick House by that time was Richard Rouse Boughton Orlebar; at that time, the Turret was being used as a sanatorium. In 1834, William Orlebar of Hinwick House had acquired another property, Hinwick Hall, but sold it at the end of the 19th century.

According to Historic England, Hinwick House remained under the ownership of the Orlebar family until a sale in 1995. Another report indicates that the house was used as a school in the 1880s; during 1914 – 1918 it was used as a hospital for wounded soldiers and in 1990 was operating as the Flemish House Restaurant.

In 2014, the estate was sold and became the principal family home of The Singh Family. The Singh family is said to have spent £3.8 million on the restoration. Afterwards, the house was described by the Daily Telegraph as "a celebration of Britishness". It is Mr. Singh's understanding that the estate had been owned previous to their purchase by a family from Malaysia and then by a local businessman.

A report in late 2019 stated that the three-story home has 20 bedrooms and a dozen bathrooms, a Great Hall and a formal dining room, and separate apartments for staff. Three guest cottages, each with two bedrooms, are also on the property.

== Architecture ==
Including the Victorian wing, the house includes 25,797 square feet (2,396.6 m^{2}) of interior space.

Historic England provides this summary of the principal building:

It is a small country house of three storeys with a U-shaped ground plan, built of limestone rubble with ashlar dressings, with a two-storey stone service wing in Georgian style to the north added by C F Penrose c 1860. The two main fronts face east and south, overlooking the main garden and park areas, bounded by stone paths in which the flags are set in diamond pattern. The remains of a C19 conservatory (largely demolished in the mid C20) lie at the south corner of the west front, including low walls, a central path and steps down to the south lawn. On the west side of the stable court, facing the service buildings, lies the C19 range of stables and associated adjacent outbuildings (listed grade II), built of coursed limestone rubble. South of the stables, opposite the west front of the House, lies Turret House, the remains of the earlier manor house dating from the C16; the wooden cupola on the flat roof bears the date 1710. A small stone extension in Romanesque style (with ruinous interior, 1997) lies at the south-east corner of the building, projecting into the service court; this contains ornamentally painted wooden panelling, possibly a four-seater lavatory (G Peck pers comm., 1997) or a small gazebo.

The principal building is Grade I listed while the park and gardens are Grade II listed. The garden includes an orchard and paddock; the park area has been used by a farmer for grazing his animals.

According to the 2015/2016 Hinwick Conservation report, "the house is the architectural highlight of the surrounding area".

== See also ==
- Air Vice Marshal Augustus Orlebar
- The house was used as a college for adults with learning disabilities up until 23 July 2014 (https://www.livability.org.uk/blog/disability-care/hinwick-hall-college-closure-completion-update/)
- https://issuu.com/livability/docs/hinwick_hall_college
