= Podington =

Village in Bedfordshire, England

Coordinates: 52.254°N 0.623°W

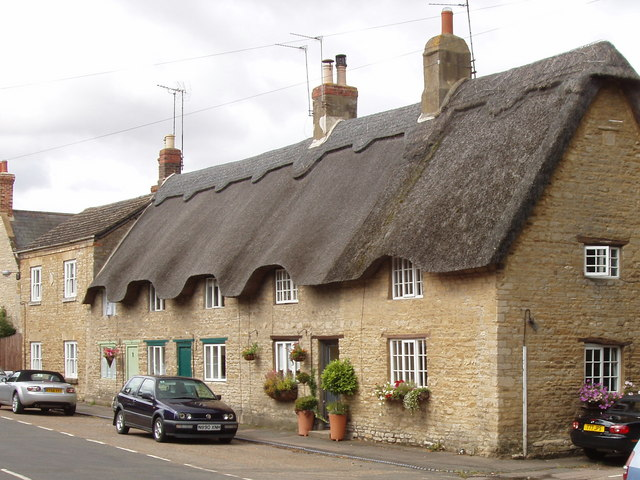
- Thatched cottages in Podington

- Location within Bedfordshire
- Population: 435 (2011 Census including Farndish & Hinwick)
- OS grid reference: SP940626
- Civil parish: Podington
- Unitary authority: Bedford
- Ceremonial county: Bedfordshire
- Region: East
- Country: England
- Sovereign state: United Kingdom
- Post town: WELLINGBOROUGH
- Postcode district: NN29
- Dialling code: 01933
- Police: Bedfordshire
- Fire: Bedfordshire
- Ambulance: East of England
- UK Parliament: North Bedfordshire

Podington is a village and civil parish in Bedfordshire, England, United Kingdom. The village is within the electoral ward of Harrold in the Borough of Bedford. Podington lies around 16 km (9.9 mi) northwest of Bedford and is about 2 km (1.2 mi) east of the county border with Northamptonshire.

Podington is a small picturesque rural village; many of its buildings are stone cottages dating from the 18th century or before. Podington was included in the Domesday Book 1086, with a population of 29 households; prominent landowners included Walter of Flanders, Hugh of Flanders and William Peverer.

The community was recorded as "Podintone" and "Potintone" from the 13th century and later as "Puddington". Today it is sometimes spelt (or misspelt) "Poddington". Located around 3 km (1.9 mi) southeast of the village are RAF Podington and Santa Pod Raceway. Hinwick House is found at a crossroads under 1 km (0.62 mi) south of the village.

Church of St Mary is a Grade I listed church in Podington. It became a listed building on 13 July 1964. Some surviving architectural elements date back at least to the early 13th century. A 1912 report about the church indicated that it had a chancel, nave, north aisle, south aisle, south porch and west tower. The south arcade of the nave, the north arcade the chancel and tower were all dated to the 13th century.

Mary I of England gave the manor to one of her servants George Brediman in 1557. Richard Orlebar, the High Sheriff for Bedfordshire and his wife, the culinary writer Diana Astry, were both buried at this church in the 1700s. They had been the owners of Hinwick House.

The church's pipe organ was restored by the 92nd Bomb Group Memorial Association. The 92nd group had been stationed at the RAF Podington airfield during WW II and flew nearly 300 operational missions from that base.

== Civil parish ==
The civil parish covering Podington also encompasses Hinwick and Farndish; although in the past Farndish had its own civil parish, it experienced depopulation and it was absorbed into the Podington parish. The civil parish is usually referred to as "Podington and Hinwick" but sometimes "Podington with Hinwick" or just "Podington". The parish is within the historic Hundred of Willey.

== Nearby places ==
Less than 1.5 kilometres (0.9 mi) to the south is the hamlet of Hinwick; the closest nearby villages between 1.5 and 3 kilometres (0.9 and 1.9 mi) away include Farndish to the northwest and Wymington to the northeast. Nearby larger settlements include Rushden to the north, Irchester to the northwest and Wollaston to the west, all around 5 km (3.1 mi) away. Wellingborough, which is 7 km (4.3 mi) northwest of Podington, is the village's post town.

== See also ==
- Podington Castle
- The Poddington Peas
- Church of St Mary, Podington
- RAF Podington
