= Santa Ana Drags =

Drag strip in the United States

Coordinates: 33°40′38″N 117°51′58″W

Santa Ana Drags was the first drag strip in the United States. The strip was founded by C.J. "Pappy" Hart, Creighton Hunter and Frank Stillwell at the Orange County Airport auxiliary runway in southern California and was operational from June 19, 1950 until June 21, 1959

== Making history ==
Many pioneers in drag racing began at Santa Ana. Art Chrisman, Don Yates, Calvin Rice, Joaquin Arnett, George "Ollie" Morris and others participated regularly.

The strip was created with $1000 startup money, and charged both spectators and participants 50 cents, of which 10% went directly to the owner of the airport. The strip installed timing clocks, so racers could actually get accurate times for each run. There was also a pit area, restrooms, a concession stand and primitive grandstands for spectators and plenty of parking. It was closed due to pressure from C.J Hart, whose wife had hired a private investigator to determine if Frank Stillwell was stealing money from the gate receipts in 1957.

== Main Street Malt Shop and Santa Ana Drag Strip Reunion ==
Reunions are held twice a year, in April and October in Santiago Creek Park in Santa Ana, California, including the April 14, 2012 event. They are now organized by Leslie Long, after being organized by Bill and Marie Jenks previously.

== See also ==
- National Hot Rod Association
- Wally Parks
