= Bradley & Craven Ltd =

Defunct British brickmaking machine manufacturer

- Company type: Private company
- Industry: Manufacturing
- Founded: 1843; 182 years ago
- Founder: William Craven and Richard Bradley
- Defunct: 1972; 53 years ago
- Fate: Merged
- Successor: Craven Fawcett Limited
- Headquarters: Wakefield, United Kingdom
- Area served: United Kingdom, Australia, South Africa and Germany
- Products: Brickmaking machinery, steam engines, and colliery winding gear

Bradley & Craven was a British manufacturing company specializing in brickmaking machinery that was based in Wakefield, England. The company also made steam engines, colliery winding gear and exhibited in the 1862 London International Exhibition. The company operated from 1843 until it was merged with a rival in 1972.

== History ==
It was founded in 1843 by two young engineers, William Craven and Richard Bradley to manufacture what was then revolutionary machinery for automating clay brick production. Their 1853 patented ‘Stiff-Plastic Brickmaking Machine’ in combination with the Hoffman continuous kiln were responsible for changes in the industry which eventually saw a shift from hand craft to mechanized production.

Their machines were manufactured at the Westgate Common Foundry in Wakefield and were sold throughout the United Kingdom as well as many oversees markets such as Australia, South Africa and Germany.

In 1972 Bradley & Craven, amalgamated with a rival Leeds company, Thomas C. Fawcett, forming Craven Fawcett Limited. However the name continued in use with a new private limited company of the same name incorporated on 1 October 1998 and dissolved on 30 July 2002.

== See also ==
- Brunswick brickworks
- Hoffman kiln
- Brick
- Brickwork
- Brickyard
- Masonry
- Factories

== External sources ==
- Falkirk Community Trust, Museum and Archive collection
- Model of brickmaking machine, Market Hall, Accrington
- Grace's Guide entry for Bradley and Craven
