= Milton Creek Country Park =

Park in Kent, England

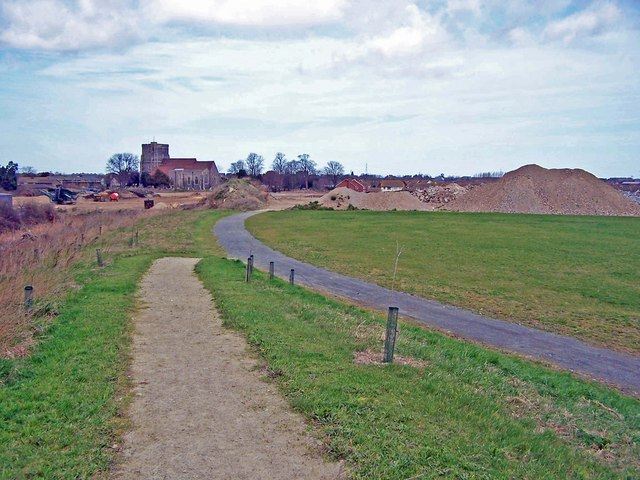
- Footpath under construction

- Location within Kent
- OS grid: TQ 912 653
- Coordinates: 51°21′18″N 0°44′42″E
- Area: 128 acres (52 ha)
- Created: 2011 (Was Church Marshes in 2001)
- Operator: Swale Borough Council,
- Open: 7 days a week, dawn until dusk
- Status: complete
- Website: Milton Creek Country Park

Milton Creek Country Park is situated in 128 acres between Milton Regis and Kemsley, on the west bank of Milton Creek in Sittingbourne, Kent, England. This site was once called Church Marshes Country Park.

== Geography ==
Church Marshes is at the base of Kemsley Down (hills near Kemsley), on the banks of Milton Creek where it flows into the Swale. It is partly due to these two navigable waters which link directly to the River Thames and its estuary across the English Channel to Europe, that marshes formed and gave nearby locations their rich history. The marshes are named after Holy Trinity Church in Milton Regis. (See Milton Regis for more details on the church).

== History ==
The site of the country park has been used since early times and archaeological evidence shows that Saxon and Roman Britain settlements were present in the vicinity. Holy Trinity Church and Castle Rough are the last remaining local historical features.

In the Victorian era the region was used for barge-building and gravel extraction for brick-making. Barges transported the bricks to London and returned with London’s domestic waste to be burnt or buried at the site. Churchfield Wharf was also formerly the site of a ship breaking company.

The Romani people formerly had a site in the Milton Creek area. It was a former brick and gravel pit; the area became a landfill site, which closed in 1973. After the site closed, it needed remedial work due to the Environmental Protection Act 1990, carried out jointly by Swale Council, Groundwork Kent & Medway and Rural Arising Ltd (a firm of engineers and ecologists, who specialise in urban regeneration of landfill sites and other similar industrial sites). Rural Arising Ltd, together with Groundwork Kent & Medway and Sittingbourne Community College also provided training and education to a group of 15- and 16-year-olds.

The main purpose of the country park was to create a green space which met the needs of a predominantly urban population within a countryside setting rich in biodiversity. Groundwork started work in 2001. The project took place over eight phases, including dealing with the contamination and landfill gases, wildlife conservation works, planting of trees, scrubs, pond-side and meadow plants, construction of paths, picnic/play areas, etc.

When Swale Council started planning for the Sittingbourne Northern Relief Road (SNRR) which passes on the northern boundary of the park near Church Wharf on Milton Creek, it decided in 2008 to increase the size of the park to incorporate the Saxon Shore Way (running along the Milton Creek), which links Sittingbourne town centre to the country park, which was renamed in 2009 as Milton Creek Country Park. The Saxon Shore path passes through a sequence of viewpoints, one at each of the historic wharves along the creek, including Grandsdens Wharf, Eastwoods’ Wharf and Church Wharf. The aim of the project was to provide a ‘green heart’ for Sittingbourne.

Creating the park cost £2.25 million – £2 million of which was Thames Gateway funding awarded via the Homes and Communities Agency. The rest was provided by Kent County Council.

Groundwork established a Friends of Church Marshes voluntary group, which meets quarterly and a summer fete was held in 2007. They also helped construction of various paths within the park.

Various artists have been commissioned to create works to promote the country park.

The official opening of the country park was on 4 June 2012.

== Facilities ==
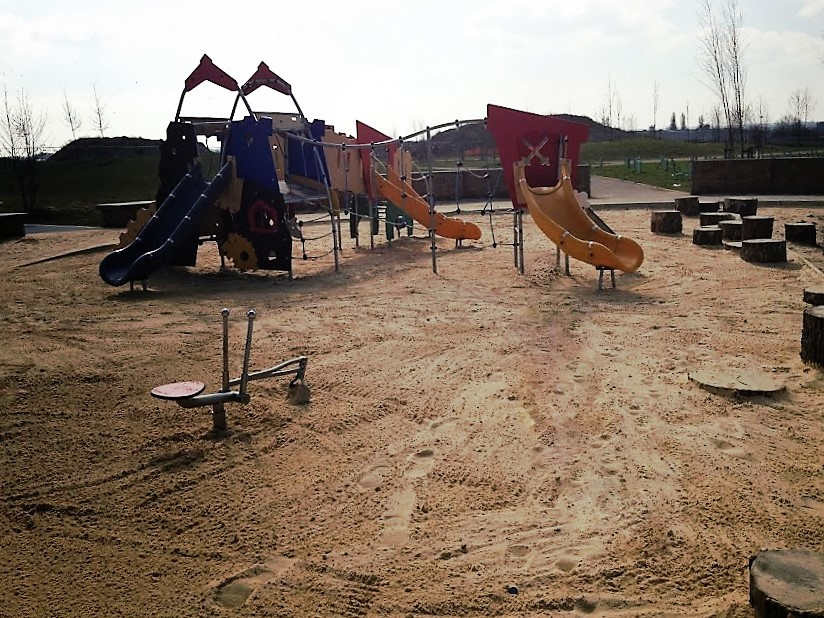
Milton Creek Country Park Play Area

As part of the Thames Gateway Parklands development, new footpath surfaces and various artworks have been placed along the Milton Creek on the Saxon Shore Way from Gas Road to the country park.

A new car park on Saffron Way was finished in 2012.

There is a large community events space and Churchfield Wharf, located next to the new road bridge, provides a 'mini-destination' next to the creek.

The 'sandscape' area has been designed for toddlers and has slides, a bridge and a large seat for parents. The 'marshland' space, has been primarily designed for older children, it features a 7m space-net, reminiscent of the rigging on barges that travelled on the creek. The hill is a place where teenagers can sit.

The large lake within the park is controlled by Kemsley Community Angling Preservation Society (KCAPS) which is a community run club for members and the public. .

== Wildlife ==
Working with Kent Wildlife Trust, various groups have created ecological habitats for several rare creatures, including great crested newt and the shrill carder bee. Other wildlife found within the park includes the common lizard, Colias (clouded yellow butterfly), glow worms and slowworms.

The land at the northern end of the creek lies within the Swale Estuary Special Protection Area (SPA), Site of Special Scientific Interest (SSSI) and Ramsar Site.

A small orchard, which was ‘lost’ is being restored as a feature of the park.

Some trees have already been planted in the woodland area – funded by the Forestry Commission.

Known birds visiting the site include the redshank, black-tailed godwit, teal and grey plover.

== Park access ==
The park can be accessed in various ways, for example via Kemsley Recreation Ground, Grovehurst Road, Newman Drive (as it turns into Recreation Way), Walsby Drive (in the housing estate), Miller Close (in the housing estate), Green Porch Close (by Holy Trinity Church), Gas Road (by CPM - formerly Milton Pipes) and via the Northern Relief Road.

Also, National Cycle Route 1 passes the country park via the B2005, Saffron Way. The Swale Heritage Trail (another long distance local trail) now ends at the park via the Northern Relief Road.
