= Brickworks =

Factory where bricks are made

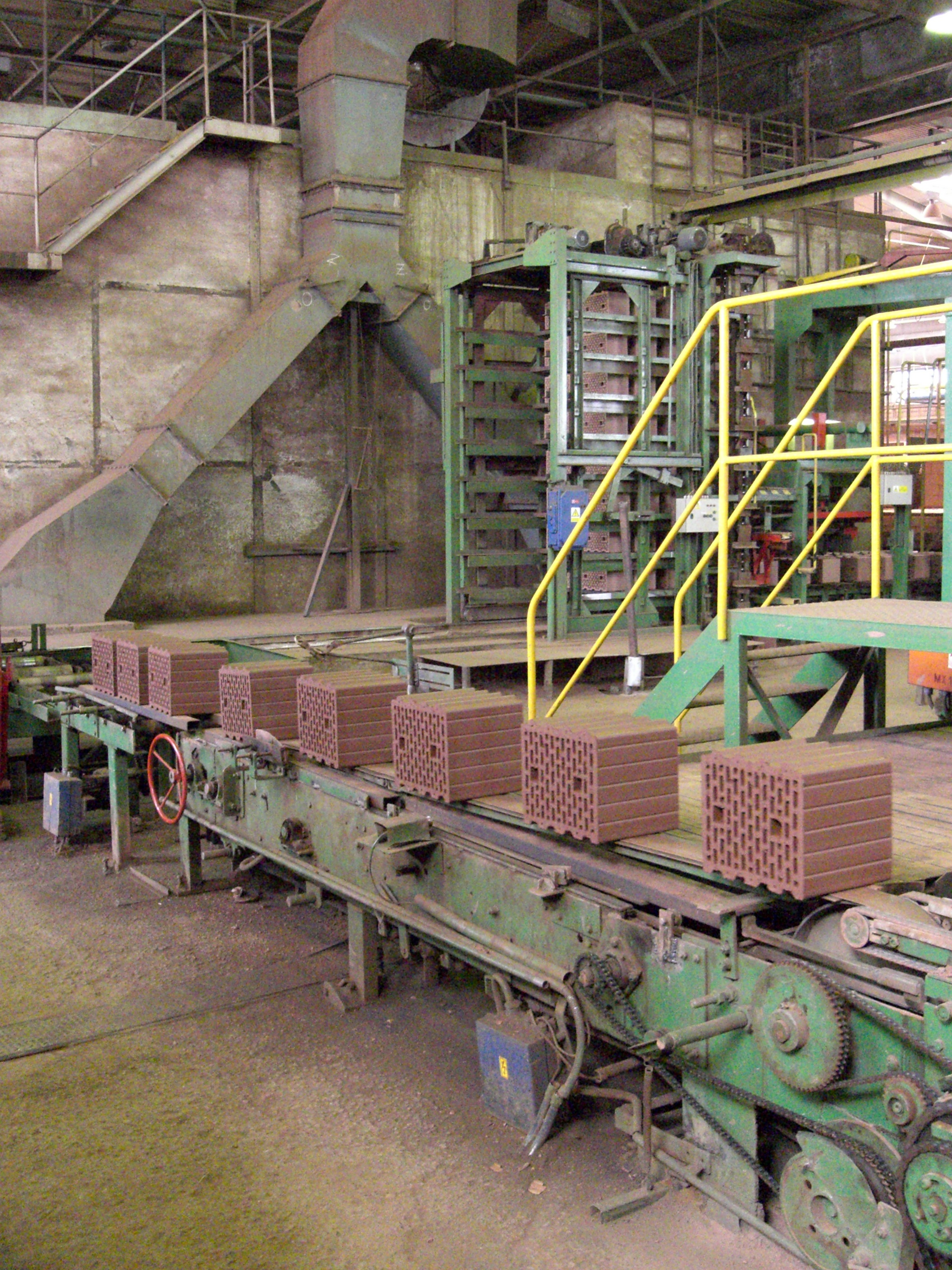
Large bricks on a conveyor belt in a modern European factory setting

A brickworks, also known as a brick factory, is a factory for the manufacturing of bricks, from clay or shale. Usually a brickworks is located on a clay bedrock (the most common material from which bricks are made), often with a quarry for clay on site. In earlier times bricks were made at brickfields, which would be returned to agricultural use after the clay layer was exhausted.

== Equipment ==
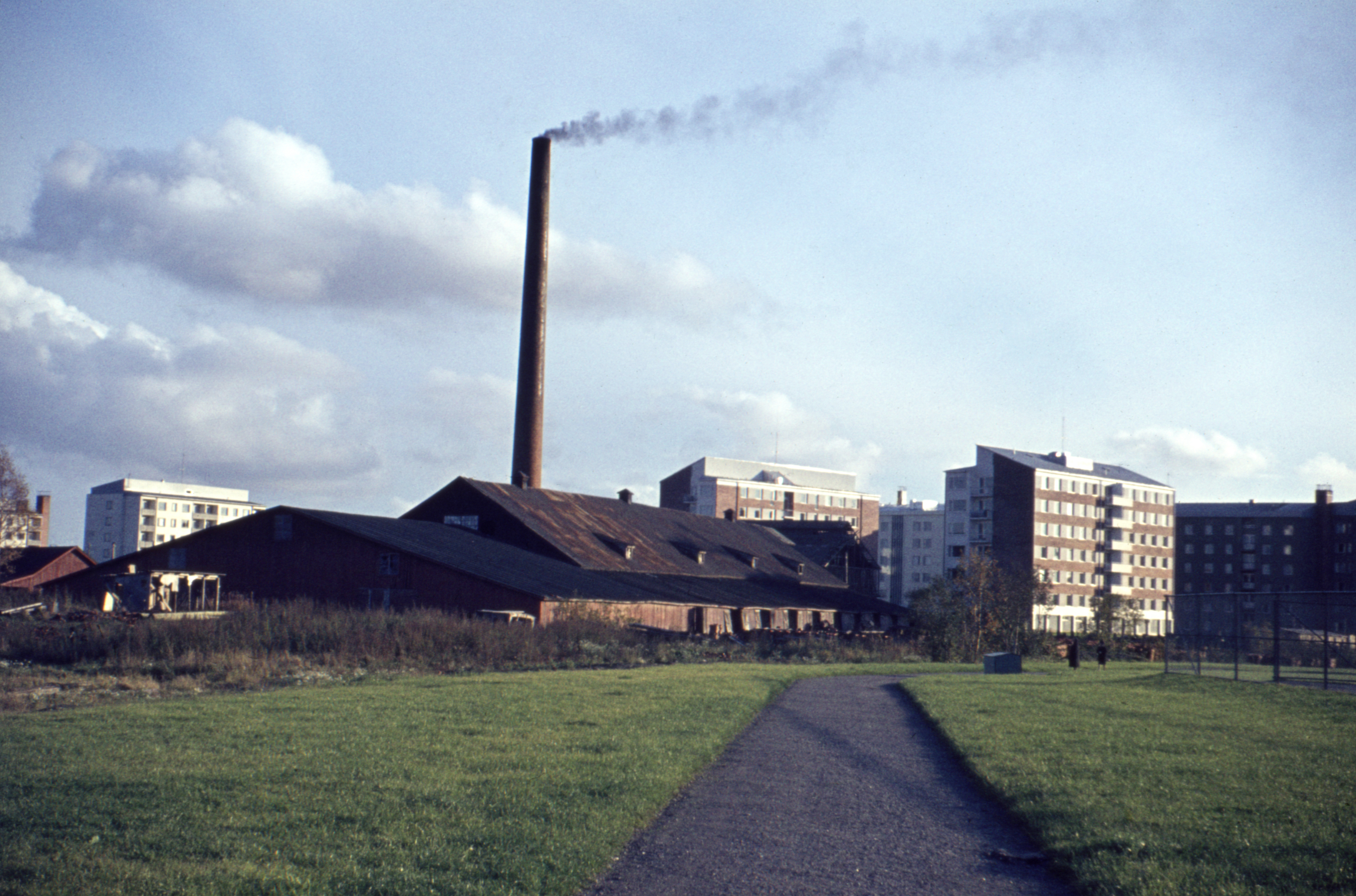
An old Puolimatka's brick factory in Kissanmaa, Tampere, Finland, in the 1960s

Most brickworks have some or all of the following:

- A kiln, for firing, or 'burning' the bricks.
- Drying yard or shed, for drying bricks before firing.
- A building or buildings for manufacturing the bricks.
- A quarry for clay.
- A pugmill or clay preparation plant (see below).

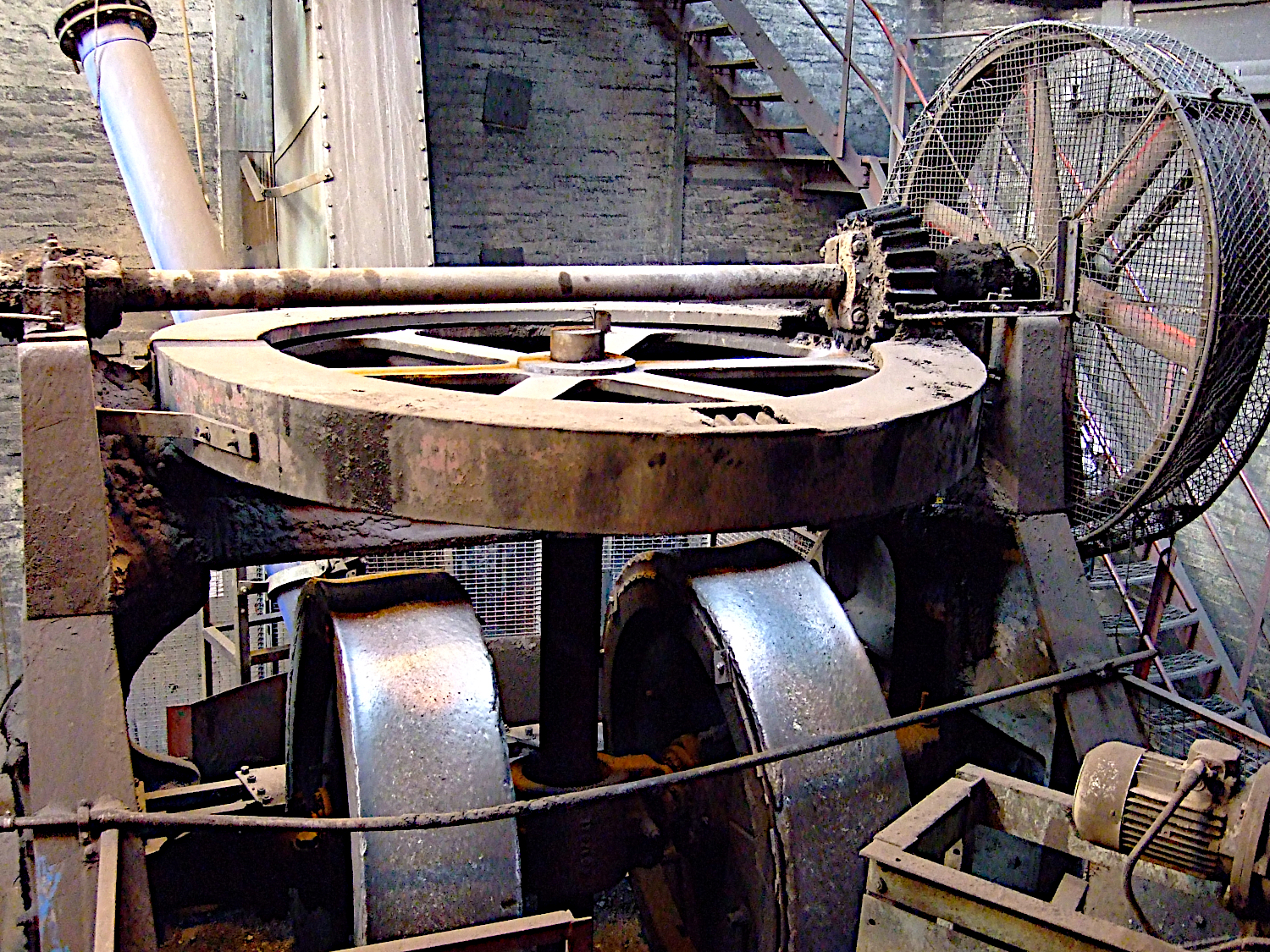
A pan mill at Etna Brickworks in Armadale, West Lothian, Scotland. A pan mill is used for grinding crushed raw materials before screening (2012).

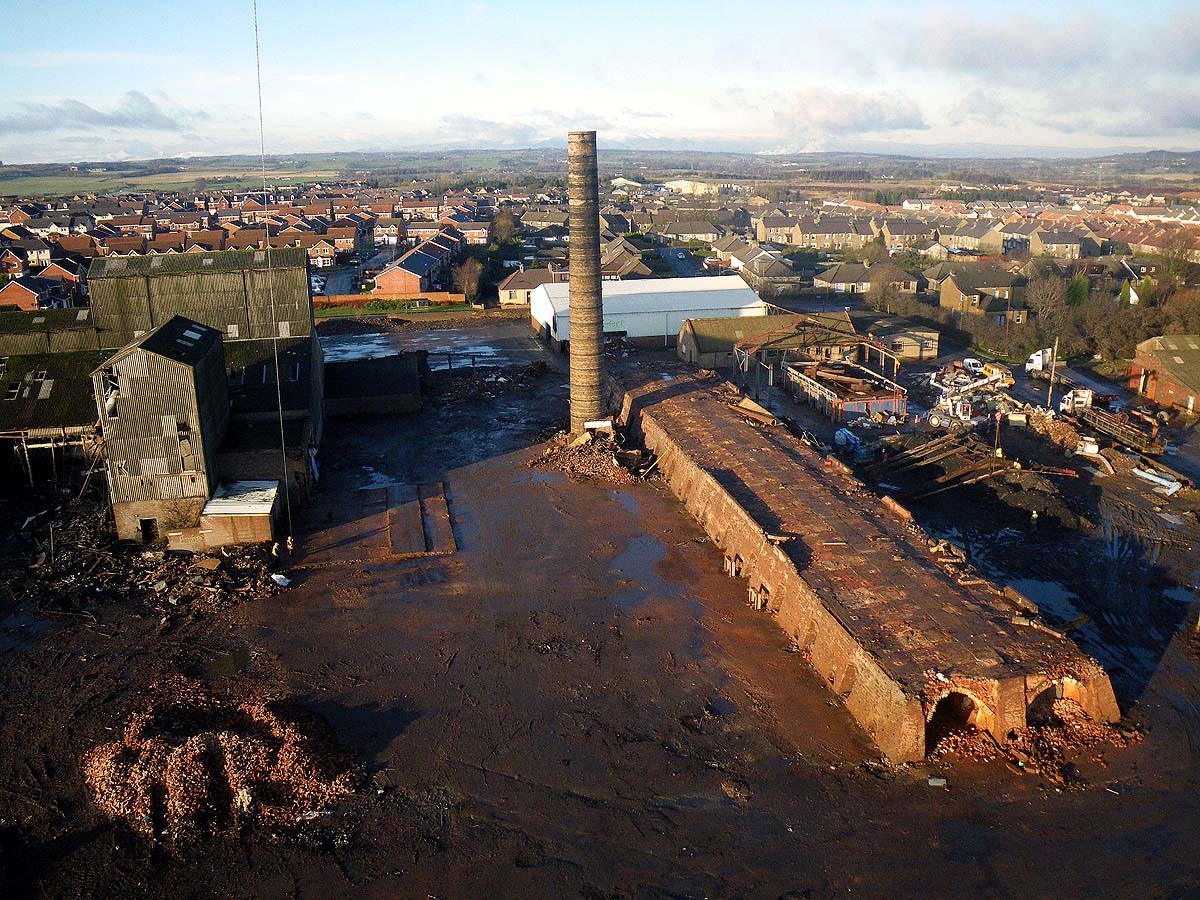
A kite aerial photo of the Hoffmann kiln at Etna Brickworks in Armadale, Scotland, during demolition in 2012.

== Brick making ==
Bricks were originally made by hand, and that practice continues in developing countries and with a few specialty suppliers. Large industrial brickworks supply clay from a quarry, moving it by conveyor belt or truck/lorry to the main factory, although it may be stockpiled outside before entering the machinery. When the clay enters the preparation plant (Clay Prep) it is crushed, and mixed with water and other additives which may include breeze, a very fine anthracite that aids firing. This process, also known as pugmilling, improves the consistency, firing qualities, texture, and colour of the brick. From here, the processed clay can either be extruded into a continuous strip and cut with wires, or be put into moulds or presses (also referred to as forming) to form the clay into its final shape. After the forming or cutting, the bricks must be dried - in the open air, in drying sheds, or in special drying kilns. The dried bricks must then be fired or "burnt" in a kiln, to give them their final hardness and appearance.

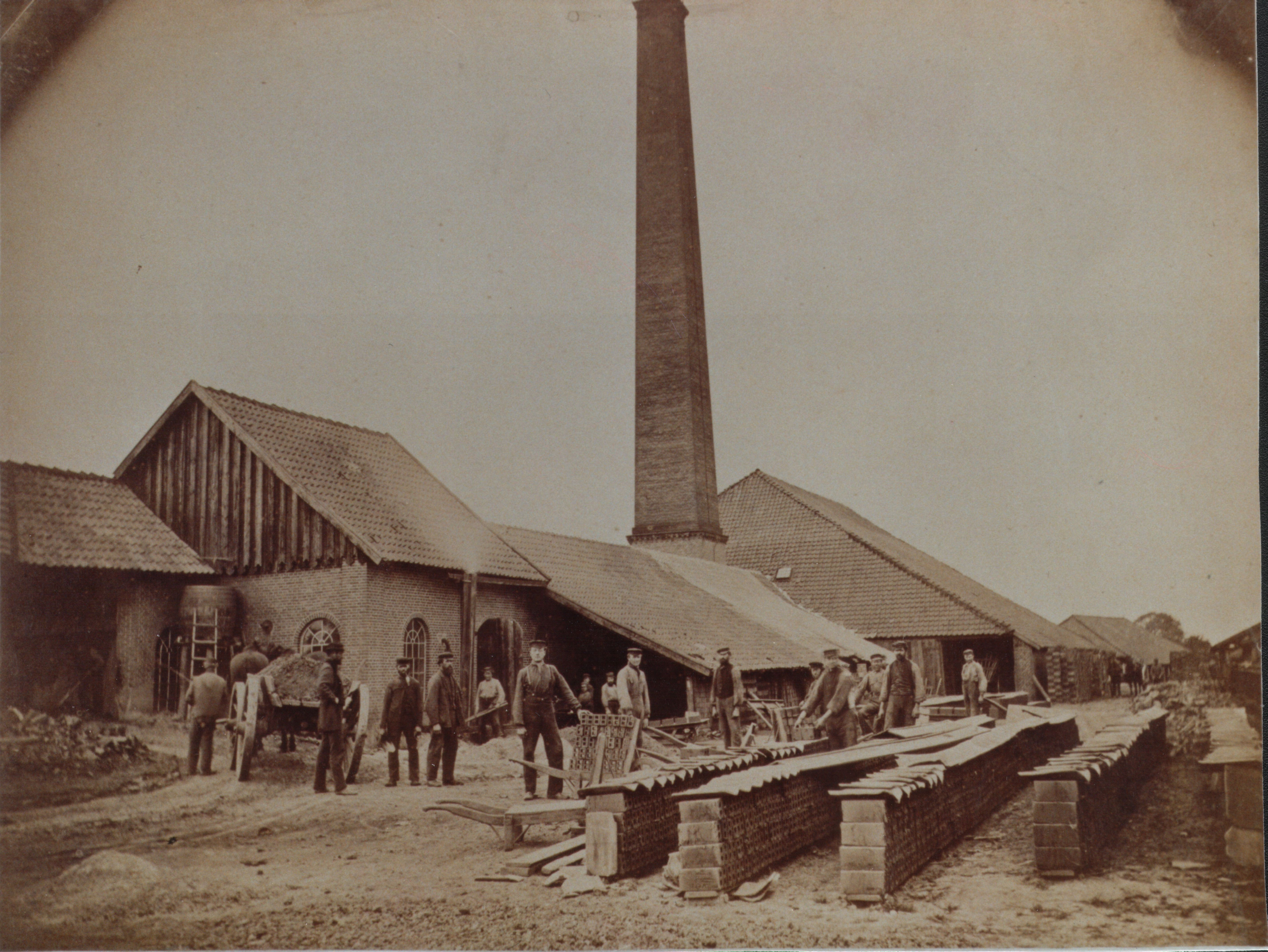
Men working in the yard of a brickworks in Germany, the tall chimney of the kiln visible, 1890

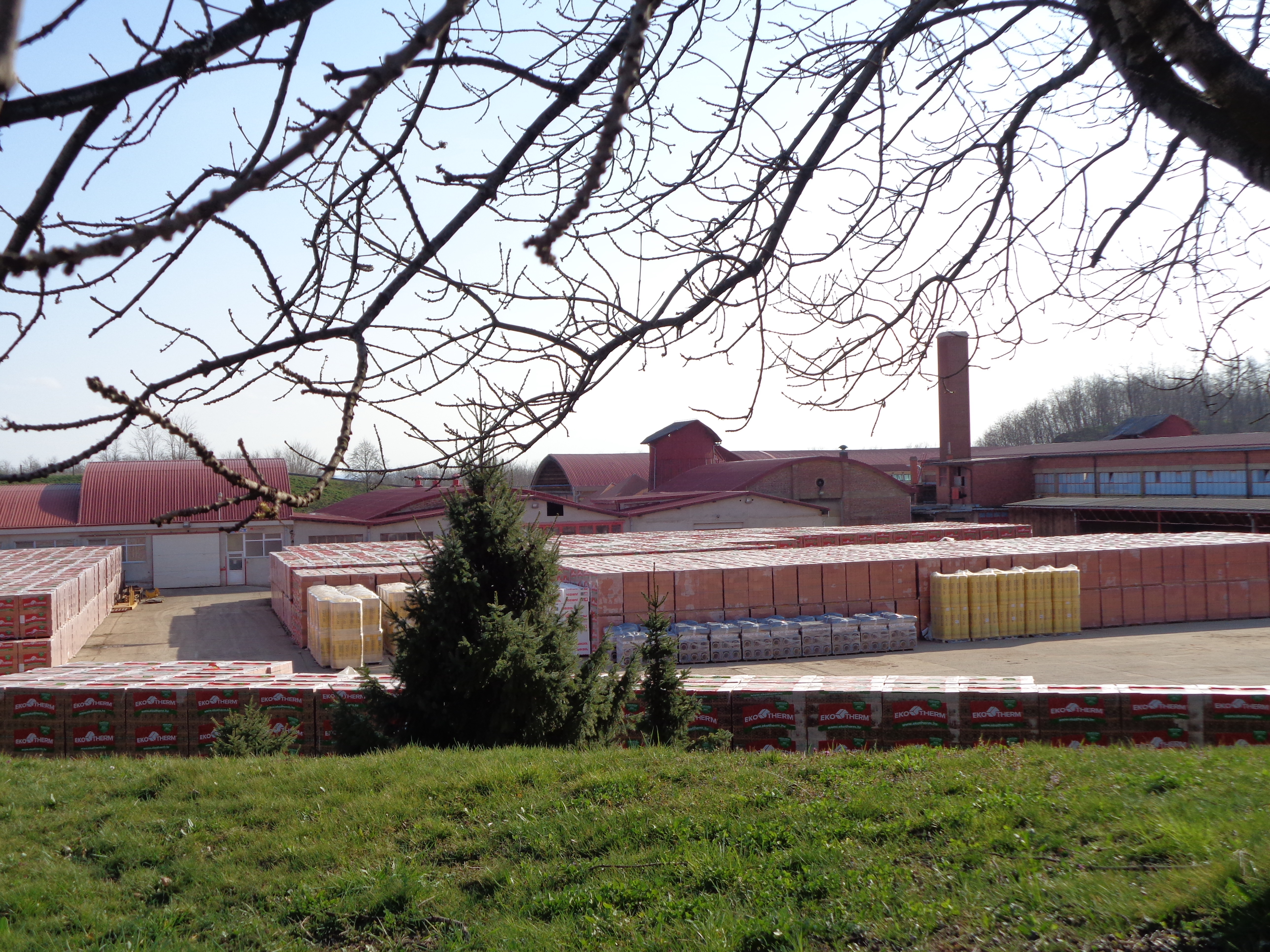
Packed bricks stored in a brickworks in Croatia

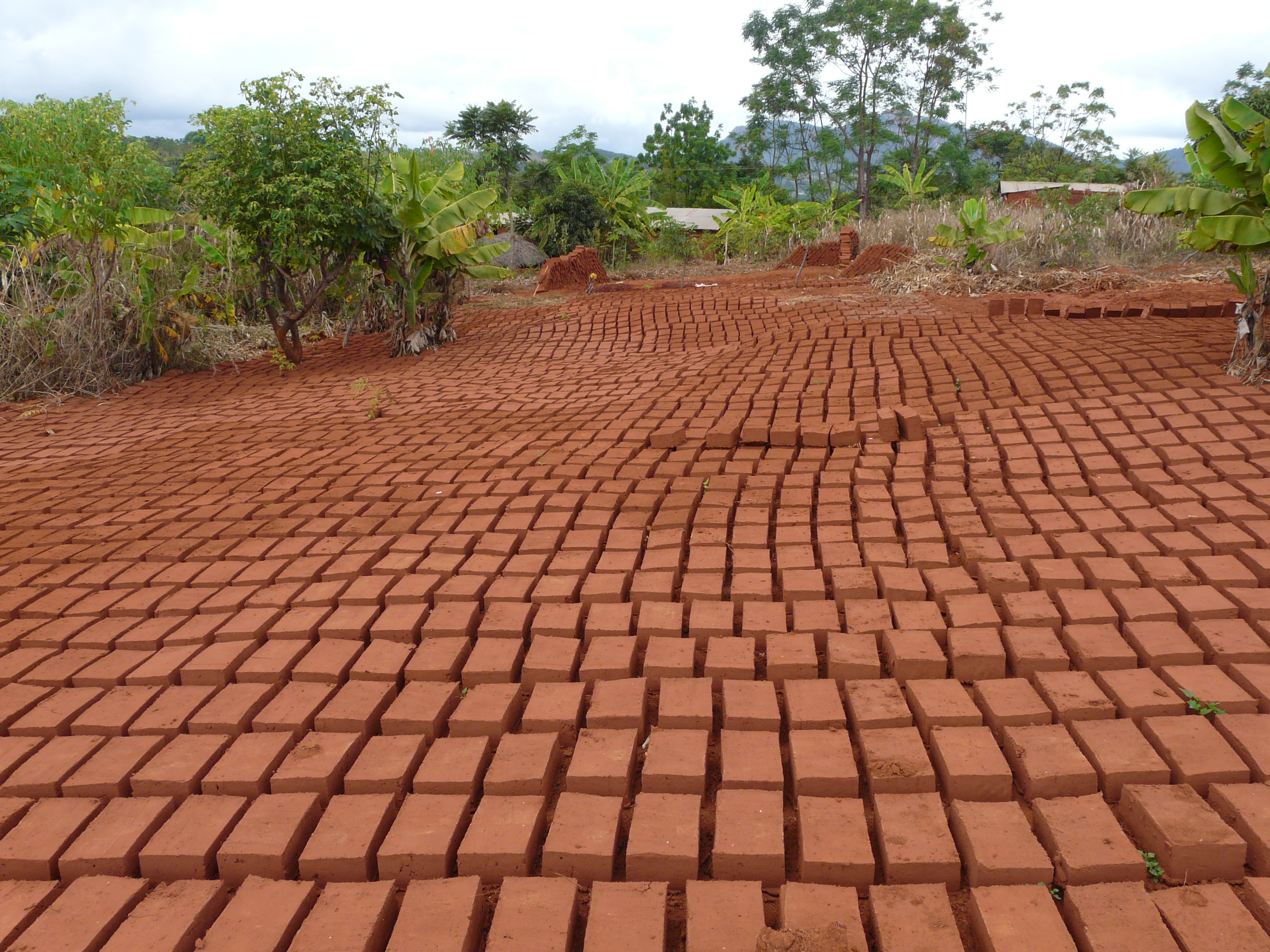
Bricks set out to dry in Songea, Tanzania

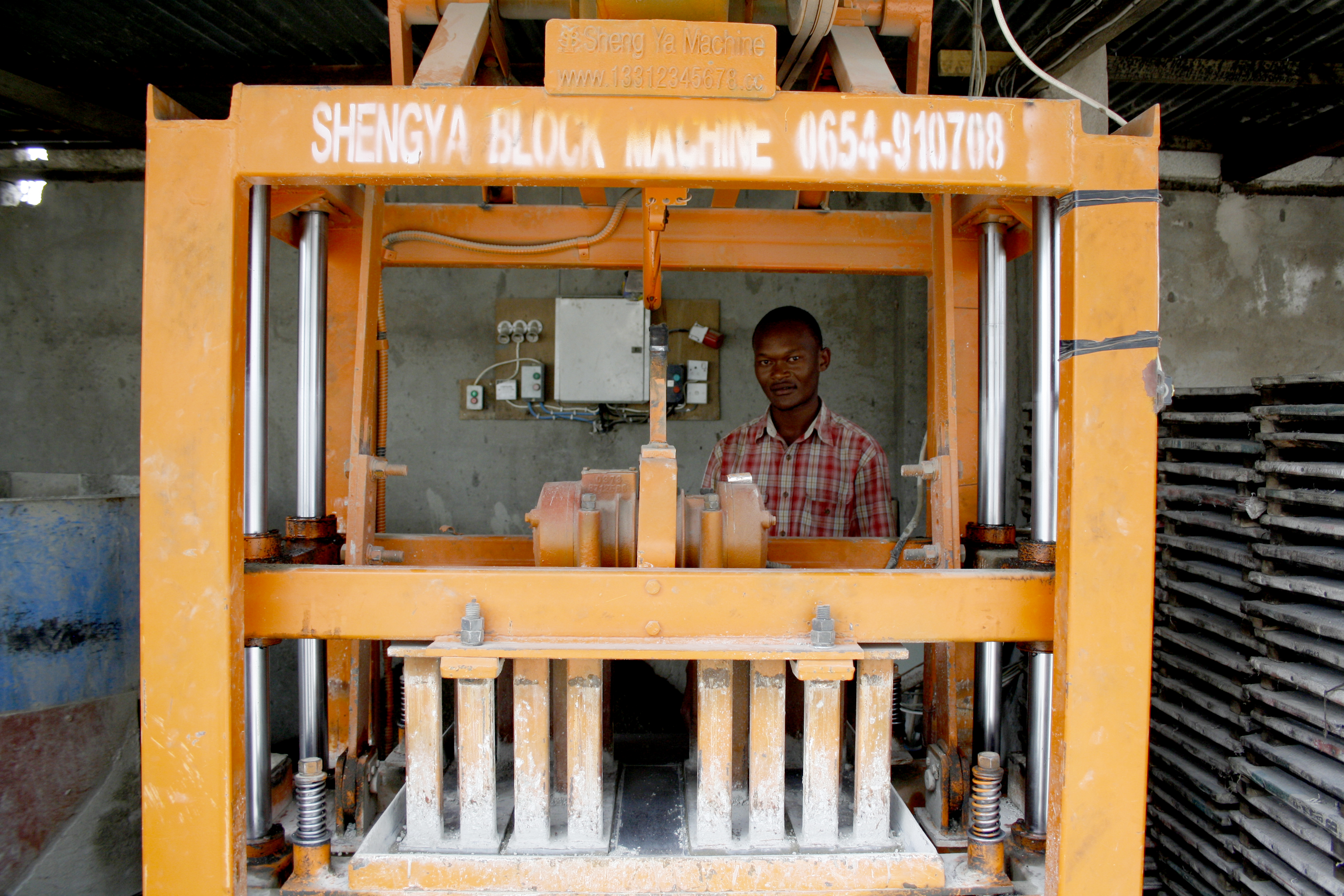
A brick-making machine in Tanzania

In the mid-nineteenth century the development of automated brickmaking machines such as Bradley and Craven's "Stiff-Plastic Brickmaking Machine" revolutionised the brick-manufacturing process.

As of 2016, one of the largest single brickworks site in the world able to manufacture one million bricks per day stands on the banks of the Swan River in Perth in Western Australia.

== Environmental effects ==
Zigzag brick kilns are recommended over traditional brick kilns because they consume less coal.

== Historical notes ==
In the past, clay was often transported from the quarry to the brickworks by narrow gauge railway or aerial ropeway.

== Notable brickworks ==
- The London Brick Company
- Bursledon Brickworks
- Evergreen Brickworks

== See also ==
- Brick clamp – Open-air brick kiln
- Brickfield – Places where bricks are made
- Brickyard – Factory for manufacturing bricks
- Masonry – Building of structures from individual units of stone, bricks, or blocks
- Program on Energy Efficiency in Artisanal Brick Kilns in Latin America to Mitigate Climate Change
