= Milton Regis =

Village in Kent, England

Coordinates: 51.349998°N 0.750000°E

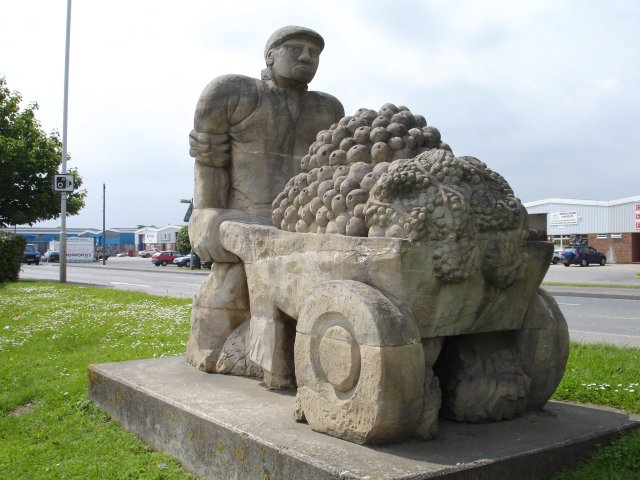
- Known by their fruits

- Location within Kent
- Population: 4,801 (2005); 4,947 (2011)
- OS grid reference: TQ892653
- District: Swale
- Shire county: Kent
- Region: South East
- Country: England
- Sovereign state: United Kingdom
- Post town: Sittingbourne
- Postcode district: ME10
- Dialling code: 01795
- Police: Kent
- Fire: Kent
- Ambulance: South East Coast
- UK Parliament: Sittingbourne and Sheppey

Milton Regis is a village in the district of Swale in Kent, England. Former names include Milton-next-Sittingbourne, Milton Royal, Middleton, Midletun and Middletune. It has a population of about 5,000. Today it is a suburb of Sittingbourne, although this has not always been the case. Until around 1800, Sittingbourne was a small hamlet and under the control of the Manor of Milton Regis.

The ancient settlement was near the church, and the current Milton Regis dates back only to 1052. There are still many timber-framed houses and buildings, including a Medieval Court Hall (a seat of Justice and Administration) that dates back to 1450.

The town and Manor of Middleton Regis, as it was called then, was recorded as the largest and most powerful manor in the lathe of Scraye (in the centre of Kent). Milton Regis was formerly part of the Sittingbourne and Milton urban district.

== Geography ==
The area occupied by Milton Regis is low-lying, often marshy, land along the banks of Milton Creek.

The creek is a drying arm (Note: An arm in this context is a branch off the main river. A drying arm is one where the arm dries out at low tide.) of the River Swale which divides the Isle of Sheppey from the mainland. The Swale connects in the west with the lower reaches of the River Medway and was the main transport route to the cities and towns of Rochester, Chatham and Maidstone. The Medway drains into the Thames estuary and allows inshore craft easy passage up to London and beyond. The eastern end of the Swale connects directly into the Thames estuary near Whitstable. Small coastal craft can navigate down the Thames into the North Sea and then by the short sea passage to Europe. Around a mile to the south of Milton is the old Roman road of Watling Street, linking London to Canterbury and Dover.

One of the small hills in the area is occupied by Holy Trinity Church, and the area below this, between the hillock and the creek, was the original site of the town. The area is prone to flooding, and after the sack of 1052 the town centre was moved atop the next hillock south, where it remains to this day. The old site is now the northern part of the Milton Creek Country Park.

== History ==
The very early history of the site is speculative based on geography and the few remains found.

An excavation at Castle Rough to the north of Milton Regis in 1972 uncovered around a hundred Mesolithic flint artifacts. They were present in disturbed material, but indicate an unknown flint factory was in the vicinity. Slightly further north, beyond the modern Kemsley village, there used to be a Neolithic site from which worked stone implements have been retrieved. The site was destroyed by brick earth digging in the 1880s.

The 1972 dig at Castle Rough also revealed sherds of Romano-British pottery in the disturbed layers. The Romans noted the quality of the barley and the oysters from Milton and established the town.

Local tradition records that princes Hengist and Horsa, during their takeover of the kingdom of Kent from the local sub King Vortigern in circa 449, built a fortress or garrison near the remains of a Roman fort.

In 680, the Queen Seaxburh of Kent, the widow of King Eorcenberht of Kent, passed the Kingdom of Kent to her eldest son Ecgberht of Kent at his coming of age, crowning him King of Kent at a grand ceremony held at the doors of Holy Trinity Church, Milton. There she became a nun: "St. Seaxburh ... took the holy veil at the minster which is called Milton in Kent. And the island in Sheppey belongs to Milton".

The Anglo-Saxon Chronicle for 893 records: "Then ... Haesten came with eighty ships into the mouth of the Thames, and made himself a fort at Milton Royal". This naval force was only part of a larger fleet of 250 ships, the remaining group under the command of Jarl Harald (Bloodhair) landing at Appledore in the Romney Marsh in the south of Kent. It has long been supposed that this fort was at Castle Rough, but modern archaeological research has thrown doubt on the identity.

The Anglo-Saxon Chronicle also records Godwin, Earl of Wessex, a powerful nobleman at the time, burning the town to the ground in 1052. This was one of several Royal towns and property possessions belonging to King Edward the Confessor that were destroyed by Earl Godwin's army, during a dispute which lasted over many years in respect of Earl Godwin's challenge and claim to the throne of England. The town was later rebuilt to its former eminence.

Domesday Book of 1086 records the town as Middleton Terra Regis (Royal lands) the Kings town of Kent. It is noted as a town and a port of wealth, which William the Conqueror took into his personal possession and then gave into the hands of his half-brother Odo for safe keeping, also appointing a portreeve, Hugh de Port, to preside over the town. Later, he was to become the shirereeve or Sheriff of Kent.

Edward Hasted notes that a document of 21 Edward I (1259–60) records the hundred as being the King's hundred. Queen Philippa was given the hundred by her husband King Edward II. A document of 1 anno Richard II (1367–68) exempts the men of the hundred from "all watch and ward" on the sea coasts; excepting Sheppey, most of which was within the hundred itself.

Local folklore has assigned the origins of Castle Rough to the Iron Age, Romans, Hengist and Horsa, Haestan and to a medieval fortified manor house. In order to investigate it further, the 1982 dig put in a trench on the southern side of the mound. Various layers of dumped material were identified, giving a confused stratigraphy. The topsoil yielded a silver penny of Henry VI issued in York between 1454 and 1460. The base layer contained green glazed pottery of the 13th–14th century. The extant earthworks are therefore no earlier than circa 1300.

In 1798, the town was described as "... nor is it in any degree pleasant, the narrow streets, or rather lanes in it, being badly paved, and for the most part inhabited by seafaring persons, fishermen, and oyster-dredgers".

== Holy Trinity Church ==
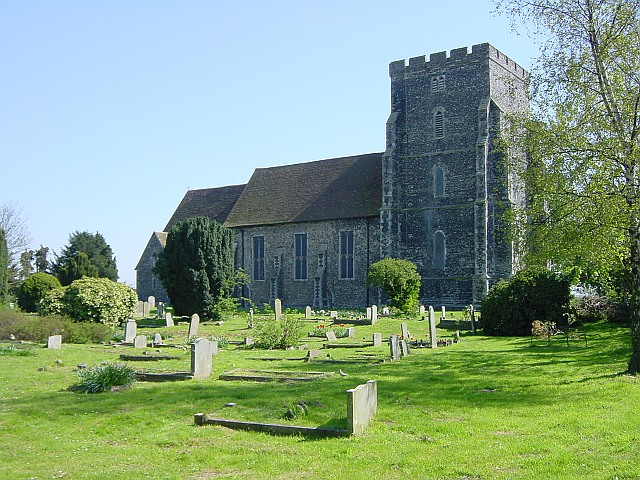
Holy Trinity Church

The church has a long history. It is believed to occupy what was originally a pagan site of worship. There was a Roman villa nearby, and Roman bricks are still visible in the church walls.

The Cathedral records of Ely in 680 state that Seaxburh of Ely (Queen Sexburga, Abbess of Minster in Sheppey) left her 'life' at the doors of 'Mylton' Church. This refers to her leaving her secular life by taking the veil as a nun.

The present church is of Augustinian foundation, though with substantial additions and rebuilding in the Saxon and Norman periods. Other parts added were a family chapel and chancery by the local Barons (the Norwode (or Norwood) family) in about 1420. In the 13th century, Stephen de Northwode built a manor in the Parish of Milton. The house was known as "Norwood without Sheppey" and also known as "Norwood Chasteners."

The church claims to have one of the thickest-walled Norman towers and to be one of the oldest churches in Kent.

For such a large tower, the ring of bells is surprisingly light. A ring of five bells was recorded in 1681, tenor 12 long cwt 15 lb (1,359 lb or 616 kg), The tenor was recast as 11 long cwt 1 qr 24 lb (1,284 lb or 582 kg) in 1890. In 1934, the whole ring was retuned and rehung, the tenor again recast, and a new treble added. In 2019, two new trebles were added, bringing the ring up to eight bells with a tenor of 10 long cwt 3 qr 13 lb (1,217 lb or 552 kg) in G hung in the English style for full circle ringing.

Local legend tells that after the village had moved to its current location, the church was going to be rebuilt in the centre. However, each time stones were moved from the old site to the new place, St Augustine came down and put them back overnight, because he had put the church where he wanted it to be and did not want it to be moved.

== Industry past and present ==
In 1887, the area was heavily involved in the paper manufacturing industry, starting under the ownership of the Lloyd family (see Edward Lloyd), wealthy newspaper publishers from London. The local mill ceased production in January 2007.

During a similar period, the area around Milton Regis and its marshlands was much involved with brick making, being rich in brick earth as a local resource. The yellow London stock brick required 64% brick earth, 25% ash, 11% chalk. Chalk was extracted from along the Medway, and the ash (or breeze as it was called) was a return cargo from London. Other components of the London rubbish provided the fuel needed to slow-fire the bricks.

The water flow from the creek provided a power source for the paper mills at Milton Regis and Kemsley to operate and was an effective, safe and cheap method of transporting the materials in and the goods out. The long commercial and industrial history of Milton Creek generated a need for a large fleet of trading barges at that time, now passed.

A major industry remaining in the area is Milton Pipes, producers of pre-cast concrete drainage pipes.

Starting in 2011, a Heritage Lottery Fund (HLF) funded community oral history project took place in Sittingbourne and Milton Regis recording the memories of people of the former industries along Milton Creek, mainly barge-building, brick and cement making, and the paper mills. In 2019 Robin Close was built on the site of a long-term derelict garage area. Named after Robin Draper, whose family have a long-term association with the area, the close finally provides a metalled road for inhabitants of Middletune Avenue to gain pedestrian access to Vicarage Road and the High Street.

== Places of interest ==
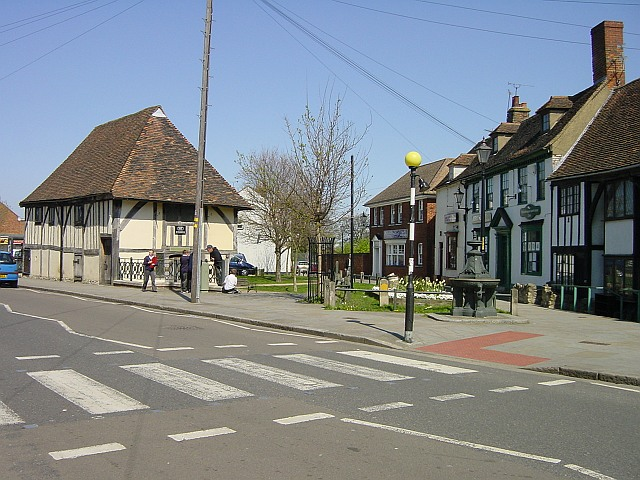
The Court Hall and Milton Regis High Street

- Holy Trinity church.
- The Sittingbourne and Kemsley Light Railway.
- The Periwinkle Water Mill. In 1985, plans to restore the mill and create a Periwinkle Water Mill Museum were announced, although the project was not completed.
- The Old Court Hall (see right), and other timber-framed buildings in and near the village centre.
- Milton Creek Country Park, previously known as Church Marshes Country Park.

== See also ==
- Regis (Place)
- List of place names with royal patronage in the United Kingdom

== Bibliography ==
- Dockray-Miller, Mary (2000), Motherhood and Mothering in Anglo-Saxon England, Palgrave Macmillan, ISBN 0312227213
- Hasted, Edward (1798a), "The Hundred of Milton, Alias Middleton", History and Topographical Survey of the County of Kent, vol. VI
- Hasted, Edward (1798b), "Milton", History and Topographical Survey of the County of Kent, vol. VI
- "History of Holy Trinity", The Parish Church of Holy Trinity Milton Regis, archived from the original on 17 April 2014
- "The Castle Rough Training Project - Part 1.", KAR articles, Council for Kentish Archaeology, 1973
- "The Castle Rough Training Project - Part 2.", KAR articles, Council for Kentish Archaeology, 1973
- "Apparent Demolition of the Neolithic Settlement at Grovehurst near Sittingbourne", KAR articles, Council for Kentish Archaeology, 1976
- Final recommendations on the future electoral arrangements for Swale in Kent (PDF), Local Government Commission for England, May 2001, archived from the original (PDF) on 4 June 2012
- Love, Dickon, "Milton Regis", Love's Guide to the Church Bells of Kent, archived from the original on 21 March 2012
- Medway Pilots, History of the River Medway, archived from the original on 25 March 2012
- Milton Precast (Company website)
- Risbridger, Rob (2010), Castle Rough - Kemsley Down Milton Regis - revisited, Friends of Milton Creek
- Rolfes, Lloyd (6 January 2011), Godwin, King Harold II to the Norwood Family, ancestry.com, archived from the original on 17 March 2012
