= Brunswick brickworks =

Australian mechanical brickworks

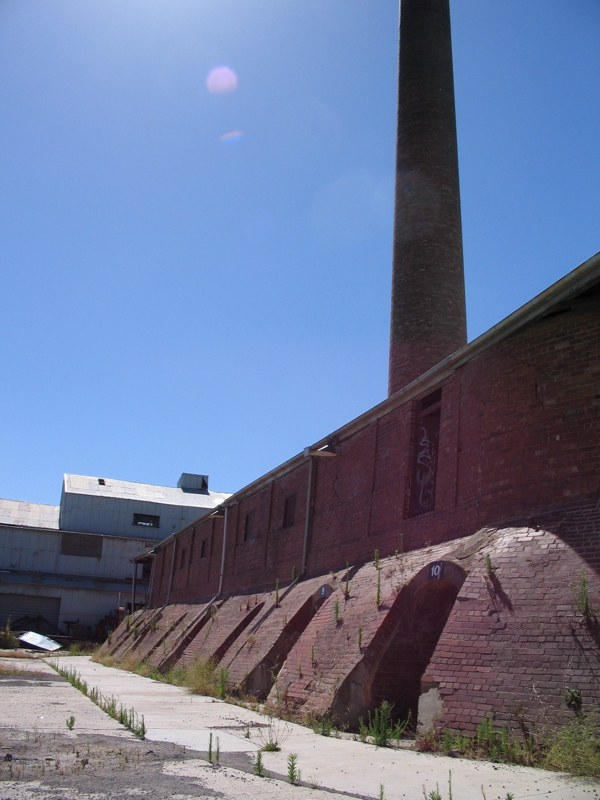
- A kiln exterior and chimney at the former brickworks No. 2 site

- Location of the former brickworks No. 2 site in Melbourne
- Built: 1870 (No. 1 site); 1884 (No. 2 site)
- Operated: 1870–1947 (No. 1 site); 1884–1993 (No. 2 site)
- Location: 72–106 Dawson Street; Brunswick, Melbourne, Victoria, Australia
- Coordinates: 37°46′12″S 144°57′09″E
- Industry: Brickworks
- Products: Bricks; tiles; earthenware; decorative pottery; terracotta pipes
- Employees: c. 400
- Owners: Brunswick Brick Tile & Pottery Company; Austral Brick Company
- Defunct: 1993

Site notes
- Area: 3 ha (7.4 acres)

Victorian Heritage Register
- Official name: Former Hoffman Brickworks
- Type: Registered place
- Criteria: A, B, C, D, F
- Designated: 20 September 1989
- Reference no.: H0703
- Heritage overlay no.: HO63
- Category: Manufacturing and Processing

Register of the National Estate
- Official name: Hoffmans Brick and Pottery Works
- Type: Defunct register
- Designated: 27 October 1998
- Reference no.: 18522

The Brunswick brickworks is a former brickworks located at 72–106 Dawson Street, Brunswick, an inner-city suburb of Melbourne, in Victoria, Australia. The three-hectare (7.4-acre) site, known as the Hoffman Brickworks, or simply Hoffman's, was built from 1884, on the traditional land of the Wurundjeri, and was the second site for the Brunswick Brick Tile & Pottery Company, (Note: The company was also known as the Hoffman Patent Brick & Tile Company.) having established, in 1870, a 4.9-hectare (12-acre) brick-making site on Albert Street, Brunswick. Collectively, the sites were the location of one of the first modern mechanical brickworks in Australia.

The No. 1 site on Albert Street was repurposed from 1947. The No. 2 site on Dawson Street was in continual use as a brickworks until 1993 and was added to the Victorian Heritage Register on 20 September 1989 in recognition of its archaeological, architectural, historical and scientific significance. The Dawson Street site is one of two surviving early Melbourne brickworks, the other being the Box Hill brickworks; and the Dawson Street site contains the largest collection of Hoffman kilns in Australia. The site was also added to the now defunct Register of the National Estate on 27 October 1998, and, on 22 August 1988, to a non-statutory heritage list by the Victorian branch of the National Trust of Australia.

Since the 2010s, large parts of the former brickworks site on Dawson Street were redeveloped for housing.

== History ==
The Brunswick Brick Tile & Pottery Company was founded by Jenkin Collier, James McKenzie, Barry Owen and Mr Rourke. Initially the firm used Pratt brick presses, and constructed continuous firing Hoffman kilns, developed by Friedreich Hoffman in Prussia in 1859. The company ordered Bradley & Craven Ltd automatic brick presses in 1887, fabricated by the Langlands foundry and a year later purchased another at the centennial exhibition. The first kiln was circular, and the company rapidly expanded and built at least five oblong Hoffman kilns between 1880 and about 1914.

In 1884, the company erected the No. 2 site in Dawson Street, south of the No. 1 site on Albert Street, as the existing clay pit was exhausted, having excavated adjacent to nearby houses. Over 400 men were employed at the No. 2 site that produced over 40 million bricks per year, reflecting the importance of the industry on the land boom of the 1880s. After the depression of the 1890s, the company expanded throughout the following decades. The Hoffmans factory whistle, which rang from 7:15 to 7:20 in the morning, to wake workers, was so regular that locals could set their watches by it.

The company also added a pottery works, much of the production going to terracotta sewage pipes as the Melbourne Sewage Scheme was being construction around the turn of the century. The pottery also manufactured a wide range of domestic wares including the Mel-rose Australian Ware.

The Hoffman No. 1 site was used as a rubbish tip from 1947, taking seventeen years to be filled completely. By 1981, it had settled sufficiently to be redeveloped by the local council as a park, named the M. W. Clifton Reserve.

== Description ==
The retained No. 2 Brunswick brickworks site on Dawson Street was instrumental both in introducing new technology into the Australian brick industry, and also in restructuring the commercial basis, leading the move to takeovers and mergers and the creation of a brick cartel or combine to set the price and production quotas for many competing brick companies.

Brick-making kilns 1, 2, and 3 – each containing a Hoffman kiln – the pressing shed (building No. 5), and an engine house (building No. 6) were retained partially intact, together with each of the kilns' chimneys. The kilns are the largest collection of Hoffman kilns in Australia. Other buildings on the site include coal conveyor equipment and change rooms (building No. 4), a grinding shed (building No. 7), a laboratory (building No. 16), a warehouse, and an office (building No. 23), and remnants of the pottery store (buildings No. 17 and 18), pottery works (buildings No. 19) and pottery kilns (buildings No. 20 and 22).

=== Sale, closure, and redevelopment ===
In 1960, the Brunswick brickworks were taken over by Clifton Holdings, another brick–maker from St Georges Road, Preston. Clifton Holdings downsized operations and sold off assets at Brunswick and other brickworks, before it was taken over by Nubrick to form the Austral Brick Company. The Brunswick brickworks operated until 1993, and, in 1996, was sold to a developer who was granted permission to demolish portions of the brickworks for apartments in exchange for preserving the most historic parts and creating a living museum or interpretive centre on the site.

The site was partly redeveloped for apartments and retained the brick press building that was in extremely poor condition and was further damaged by fire in March 2018. In June 2020, the roof of the former engine-house building collapsed. The building was also proposed to be demolished by current owners. Two Hoffman kilns, which were converted by reconstruction of the upper levels for residences, and a third kiln chimney remain. Some of the adjacent pottery-work buildings were converted into housing. Following a 2024 application for redevelopment of the remaining facilities, there was community concern that the heritage value of the site would be significantly impacted.

== See also ==
- List of manufacturing plants in Melbourne
- List of places on the Victorian Heritage Register in the City of Merri-bek
