= Llanymynech Heritage Area =

Historic industrial site in Shropshire, England

Coordinates: 52.783°N 3.087°W

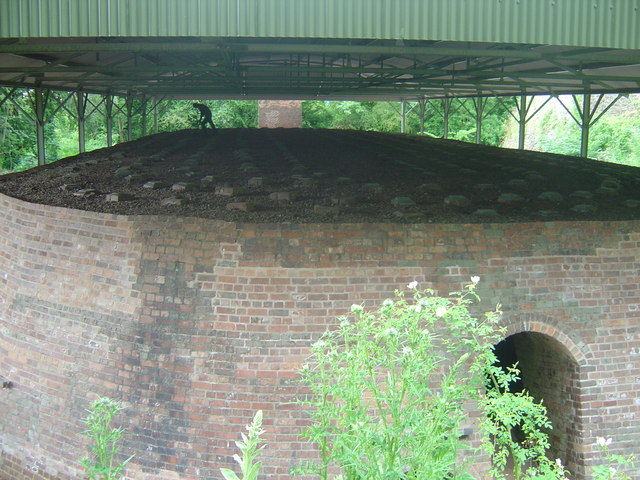
Llanymynech Hoffmann lime kiln

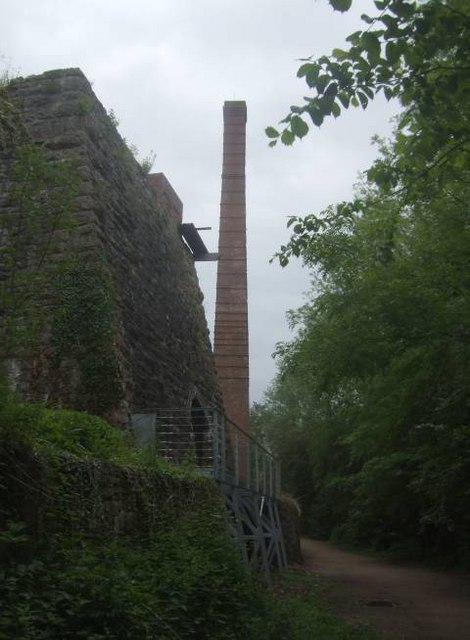
Lime kilns and chimney

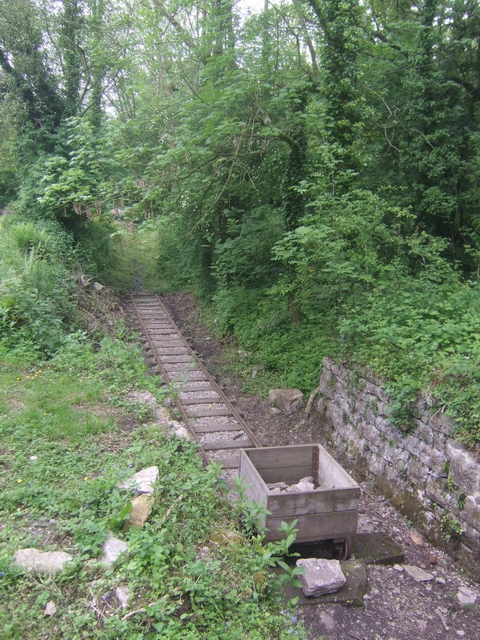
Reconstructed tramway

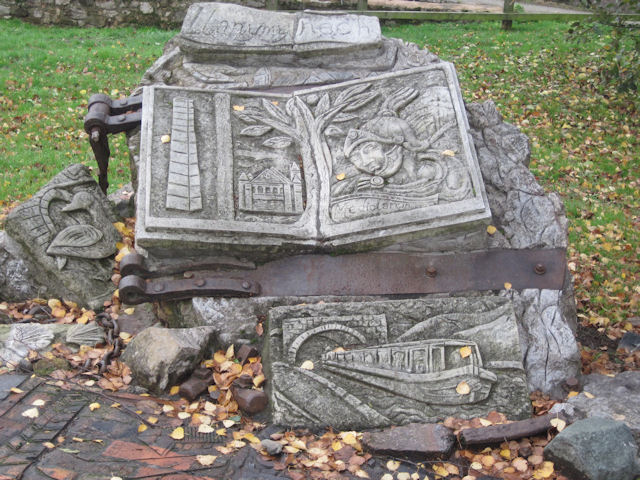
Sculpture at Llanymynech Heritage Area

Llanymynech Heritage Area is an historic former lime kiln, quarry and industrial site near the village of Llanymynech, Shropshire in the Welsh Marches. The site is adjacent to the A483 road and close to the Montgomery Canal. It is about 6 miles (10 km) south of Oswestry on the English side of the border, and about 9 miles (14 km) north of the Powys town of Welshpool.

== History and significance ==
This is a nationally significant industrial heritage area, containing one of only three remaining Hoffmann kilns in the country. It provides key insights into industrial archaeology, as it was a major centre of the lime industry until the early 20th century. It is not known when the lime industry started here, but it may date back to medieval times or possibly earlier. The first reference to the site is on a map from 1753. Evidence of early settlement locally includes a prehistoric hill fort on Llanymynech Hill, while Offa's Dyke runs close to the site on the western perimeter. The area also has a long history of industrial activity, including copper and lead mining dating back to at least the Roman period.

== Description of the site ==
Prior to the opening of the Montgomery Canal (then known as the Ellesmere Canal) in 1796, limestone quarrying was undertaken on the site on a relatively small scale, although lime kilns for lime burning appear to have been within the quarry from at least 1753. In 1806 a tramway and incline was constructed to transport limestone from the quarry to a new wharf on the canal. A second tramway was constructed to the east of the site sometime between 1807–1837 and this became the main transport route, remaining in use until the closure of the quarry in 1914.

The 1863 opening of the Llanfyllin branch line, part of Cambrian Railways, had a major impact on the quarry, enabling much faster transportation of limestone and opening up new potential markets. Additional track and sidings were built along with two draw kilns – located to the west of the Hoffman kiln. Designed for continuous operation and built after 1874, these two kilns were abandoned by 1900.

The Hoffman kiln was the last major development on the site and is believed to have been built around 1900, along with additional tramways and rail track. The kiln, which is exceptionally well preserved, measures around 44.8 × 17.5 metres (147 × 57 ft) and has two tunnel vaults entered through 14 round-headed arches. The chimney, a local landmark, stands on a plinth and is around 42.5 metres (139 ft) high.

== Restoration and community project ==
A restoration project ran from 2006 to 2009, with funding from both the Heritage Lottery Fund and English Heritage. Additional financial support also came from the Aggregates Levy Sustainability Fund and project partners, with the aim to conserve the site for visitors and educational purposes.

As part of the project, an archaeological investigation was carried out. Its main aim was to gather information about key features of the site – particularly the location of former tramways, ground surfaces and turntable track-beds.

A local community project also received funding from the Heritage Lottery Fund, highlighting the importance of the area through initiatives including:

- Commissioning a sculpture, information boards, signage and leaflets
- Providing picnic benches and seating
- Volunteer research visit, wharf clearance, tours and opening of the canalside stable block.
- Creating a website and producing a social history archive.

== Artefacts from the site ==
Some artefacts discovered at the site in recent years are on display at Oswestry Town Museum. These range from tools and a quarryman's boot to a tramway sleeper, couplings and a pulley wheel.

== Walking activities ==
This area contains a variety of short or long walks with routes leading passed lime kilns, woodland, canals, old railways, and grazed pastures. Along these routes are various information panels and sculptures to inform you about the area, some of these pathways are rough and so suitable footwear is recommended.
