= Root cellar =

Structure for storing vegetables, fruits, nuts or other foods

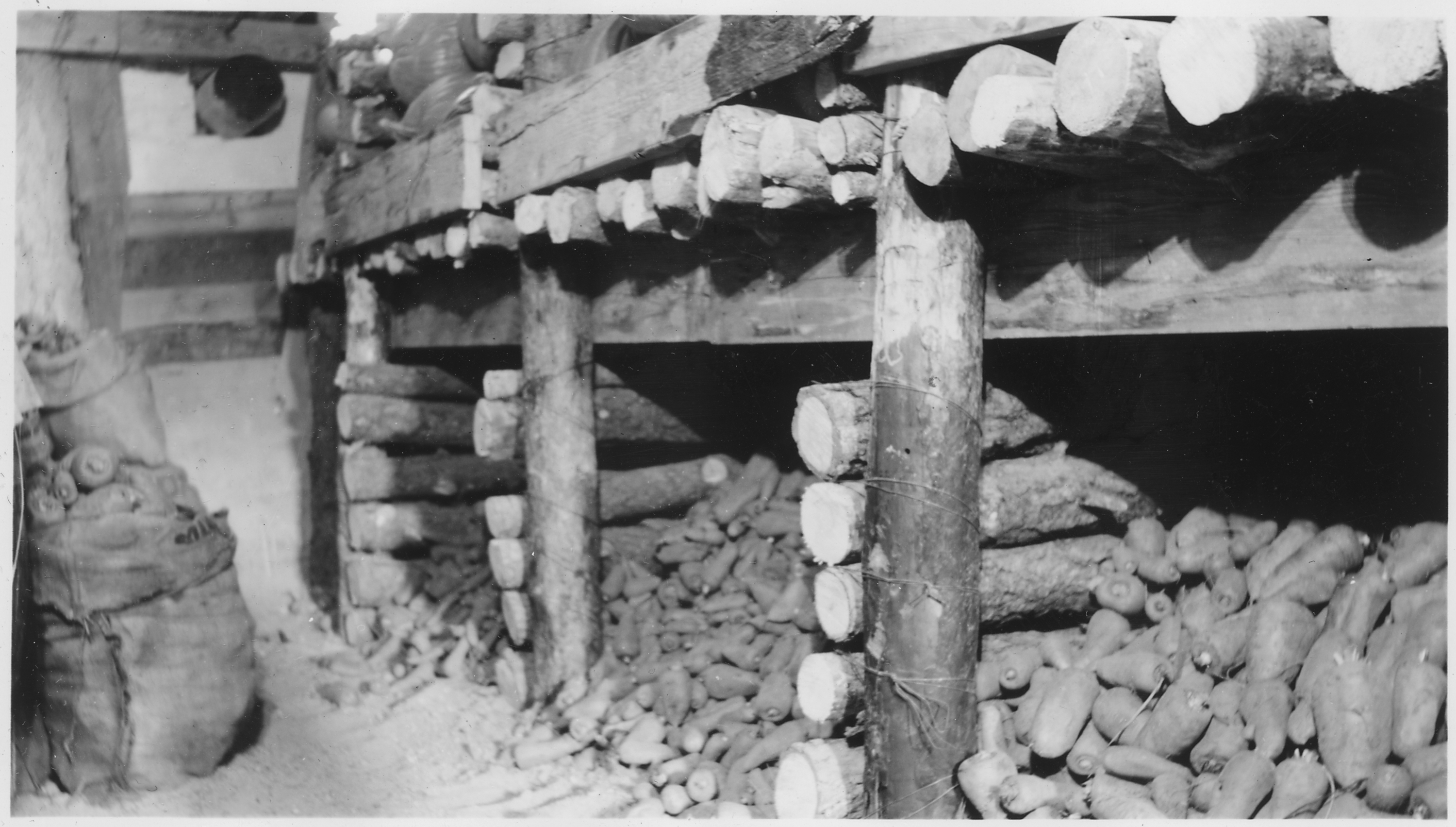
Interior of a large Wyoming root cellar with crops

A root cellar (American and Canadian English), fruit cellar (Mid-Western American English) or earth cellar (British English) is a structure, usually underground or partially underground, used for storage of vegetables, fruits, nuts, or other foods. Its name reflects the traditional focus on root crops stored in an underground cellar, which is still often true; but the scope is wider, as a wide variety of foods can be stored for weeks to months, depending on the crop and conditions, and the structure may not always be underground.

Root cellaring has been vitally important in various eras and places for winter food supply. Although present-day food distribution systems and refrigeration have rendered root cellars unnecessary for many people, they remain important for those who value self-sufficiency, whether by economic necessity or by choice and for personal satisfaction. Thus, they are popular among diverse audiences, including gardeners, organic farmers, DIY fans, homesteaders, anyone seeking some emergency preparedness (most extensively, preppers), subsistence farmers, and enthusiasts of local food, slow food, heirloom plants, and traditional culture.

== Function ==
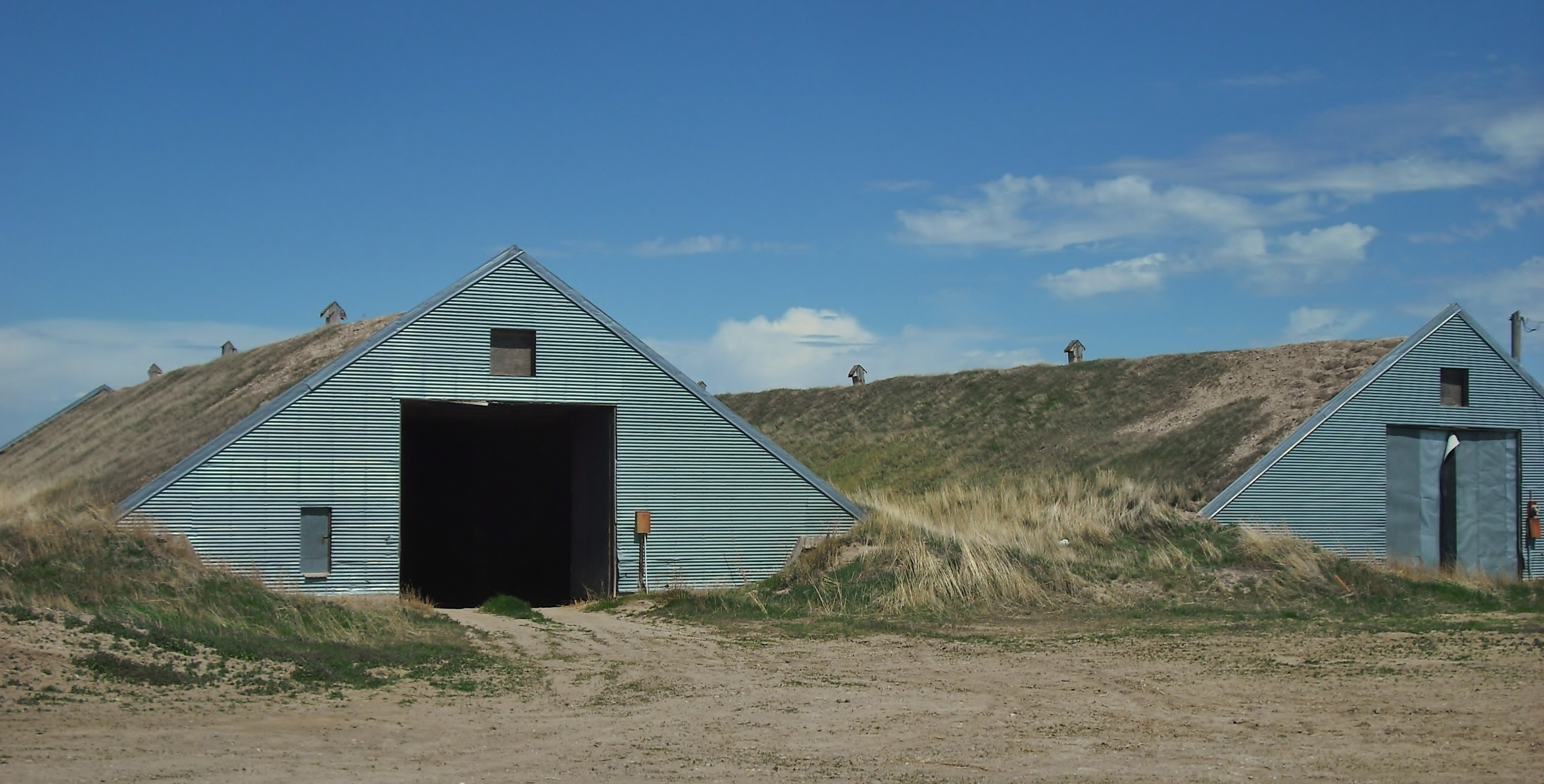
Two traditional sod-covered potato cellars in southeastern Idaho

Root cellars are for keeping food supplies at controlled temperatures and steady humidity. Many crops keep longest just above freezing (32–35 °F (0–2 °C)) and at high humidity (90–95%), but the optimal temperature and humidity ranges vary by crop, and various crops keep well at temperatures further above near-freezing but below room temperature, which is usually 65–70 °F (18–21 °C). A few crops keep better in low humidity. Root cellars keep food from freezing during the winter and keep food cool during the summer to prevent the spoiling and rotting of the roots, which may include potatoes, onions, garlic, carrots, parsnips, and others. These are placed in the root cellar in the autumn after harvesting. A secondary use for the root cellar is as a place to store wine, beer, or other homemade alcoholic beverages.

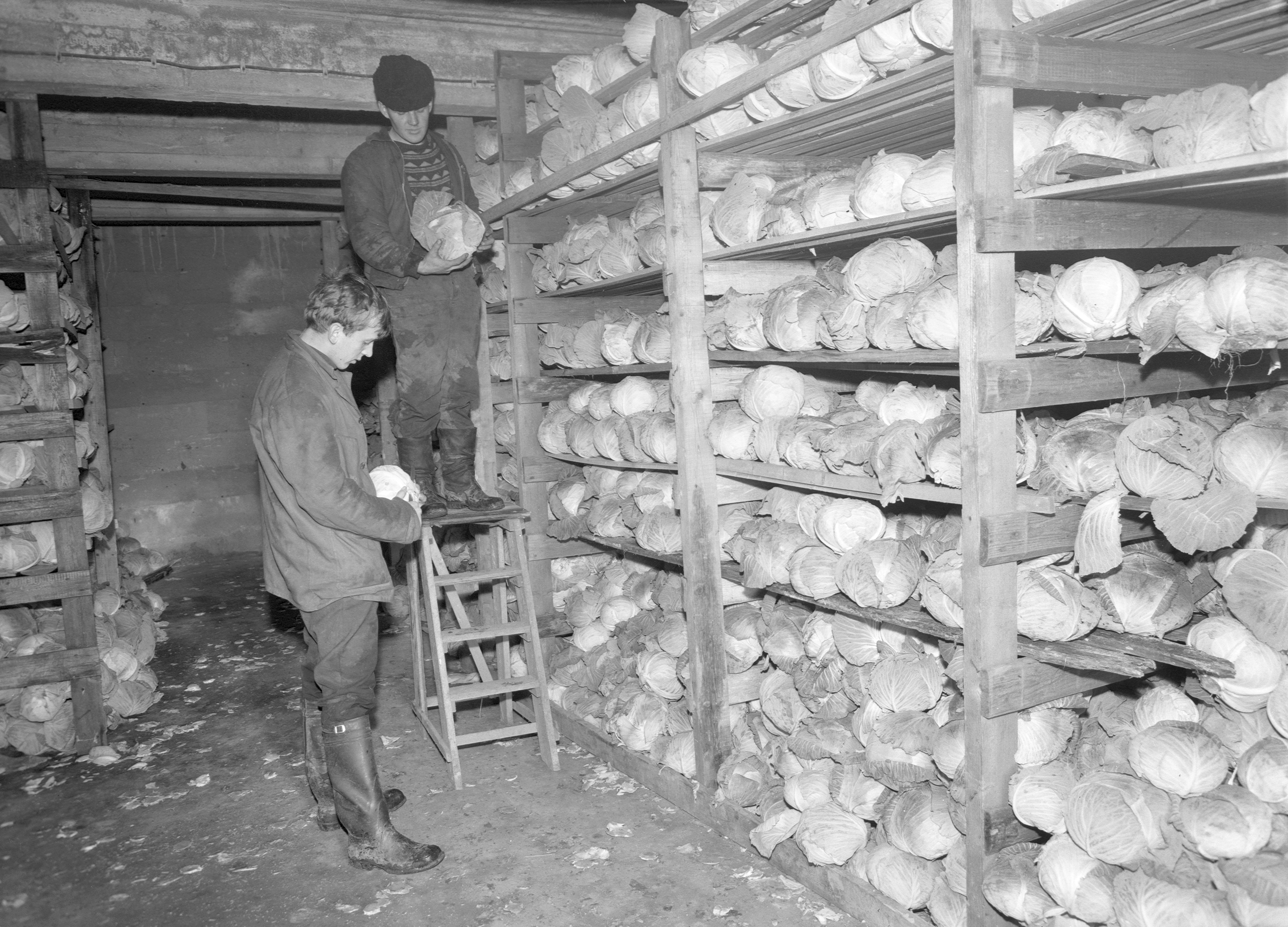
Cabbages stored in a root cellar in Nurmijärvi, Finland (1964)

Vegetables stored in the root cellar primarily consist of mostly root vegetables (thus the name): potatoes, turnips, and carrots. Other food supplies placed in the root cellar during winter include beets, onions, jarred preserves and jams, salt meat, salt turbot, salt herring, winter squash, and cabbage. Summer squash (also known as courgettes or zucchini) may last as long as three months at room temperature; American pumpkins and pattypan squash can endure six months in storage, while kabocha, turban, butternut, and spaghetti squash can be stored for as long as eight months.

A potato cellar is sometimes called a potato barn or potato house.

Separate cellars are occasionally used for storing fruits, such as apples. Apples can give off enough ethylene gas to hasten the overripening or spoilage of other crops stored nearby, although this effect is variable, and many farms successfully store vegetables without segregating their apples. Water, bread, butter, milk, and cream are sometimes stored in the root cellar. Items such as salad greens, fresh meat, and jam pies are kept in the root cellar early in the day to keep cool until they are needed for supper.

The ability of some vegetables and fruit to keep for months in favorable cellar conditions stems in part from the fact that they are not entirely inanimate even after picking. Although they may no longer qualify as living, the plant cells continue to respire in some impaired but nonzero way, resisting bacterial decomposition for a time. The effect can be compared to the way that cut flowers in a vase of water last much longer than cut flowers lying on a table: the flowers in the vase are not entirely dead yet and continue to respire. The analogy is not exact, but the high humidity that supports many cellared crops is involved in this residual respiration.

In some cases, plants are transplanted from the field to the soil floor of a cellar in autumn, and they then continue living in the cellar for months. The fact that they cannot thrive or grow larger in the low-light, low-temperature conditions is not a problem; the only objective is to keep them alive instead of dead, thus warding off decomposition. This is a form of season extension in which the growing season is not extended but the harvest season is substantially extended.

Closets, crawlspaces, garages, sheds, and attics have all been used successfully for storage of at least some kinds of crops. Even the space under a bed can store some crops (such as pumpkins) for several weeks. Especially before rural electrification, farms with springhouses have often used them for root cellar duty (as well as milkhouse duty).

== Construction ==
Common construction methods are:

- Digging down into the ground and erecting a shed or house over the cellar (access is via a trap door in the shed).
- Digging into the side of a hill (easier to excavate and facilitates water drainage).
- Building a structure at ground level and piling rocks, earth, and/or sod around and over it. This may be easier to build on rocky terrain where excavation is difficult.

Most root cellars were built using stone, wood, mortar (cement), and sod. Newer ones may be made of concrete with sod on top.

== Regional variations ==
=== Newfoundland and Labrador ===
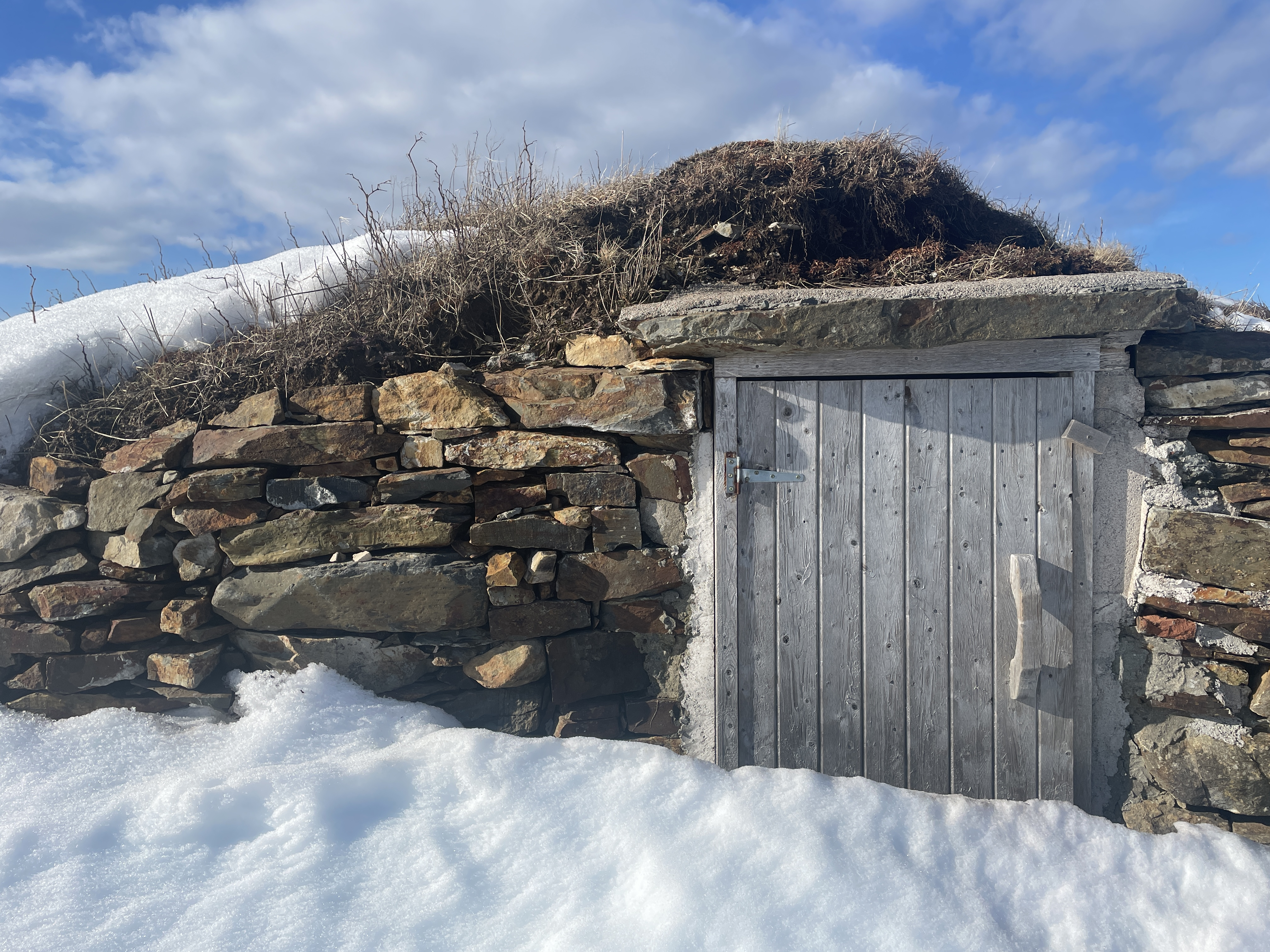
Root cellar in Elliston, Newfoundland, 2024

Historian Sean Cadigan writes, "Newfoundland and Labrador's climate and soil have not been conducive to agriculture, but outport isolation and poor incomes in the fishery have made supplementary farming crucial." People grew root vegetables: potatoes, carrots, turnip, cabbage and beets, while others grew a wider variety of vegetables in their gardens. Growing enough vegetables to last the winter was imperative to the survival of Newfoundlanders, and without refrigerators, root cellars were one of the few methods to preserve crops. Architect Robert Mellin noted the following on root cellars during his research in Tilting, Fogo Island:

Root cellars are dark, damp, and quiet subterranean structures used for storing vegetables [such as] potatoes and turnips. They are heavy-timbered, gable-roof structures built with logs (or later, sometimes with concrete), covered with shingles made of birch bark to reduce moisture penetration, and then topped with a thick layer of sod held in place by a perimeter picket fence. This precaution keeps animals off the top of the cellar and helps to retain the cellar’s shape.

Many Newfoundland and Labrador cellars use a two-door airlock-type system as a method of temperature regulation, as they allowed people ample time to enter the first door, shutting it behind them before entering the main portion of the root cellar. Folklorist Crystal Braye notes in her study of Newfoundland root cellars:

There are two basic designs for cellar foundations: the double door ground level entrance and the hatched entrance. In the double door ground level entrance, a small porch separates the exterior door from the interior door. Designed to keep frost out, the exterior door is closed before opening the interior door to access the cellar. Hatched entrance cellars are similar in size and interior arrangement but are entered from above, most commonly through a hatch located in floor of a shed constructed on top of the foundation. While lacking the porch component, the intermediate space of the shed creates a frost barrier between the cellar and outdoors. In the less common example where there is no shed, an exterior cover was placed over an interior hinged hatch, leaving a gap between the cellar interior and the outdoors.

The town of Elliston has so many of the structures, the town's motto is the "Root Cellar Capital of the World".

=== Potato hole ===
A potato hole is a hole dug in an earthen floor where a large deep opening was covered by boards and was mainly used to store sweet potatoes during the winter. The “potato hole” or root cellar was also used by slaves to hide food and personal possessions from their slave owners resulting in some slave owners to raise slave cabins off the ground to prevent their slaves attempting to create their own hidden personal space. The storing of valuables in pits was common among many cultures but for some enslaved Africans, like those from the Igbo people of southeastern Nigeria, storing valuables under the floors of their houses was often practiced.

== See also ==
- Basement – Floor of a building which is below grade
- Bunker silo – Structure for storing crops
- Canning – Method of preserving food
- Earth shelter – House partially or entirely surrounded by earth
- Larder – Cool room for storing food
- Pantry – Room where provisions are stored
- Pithouse – Type of earth shelter with ancient origins
- Refrigeration – Process of moving heat from one location to another in controlled conditions
- Sod roof – Traditional Scandinavian type of grass roof
- Spring house – Small building constructed over a spring
- Storage clamp – Type of storage of agricultural products
- Underground living – Living below the ground's surface
- Wine cellar – Storage room for wine
- Zemlyanka – Type of earth shelter with ancient origins

== Bibliography ==
- Bubel, Nancy; Bubel, Mike (1991), Root Cellaring: Natural Cold Storage of Fruits and Vegetables, Storey, ISBN 978-0882667034, OCLC 40137781.
- Coleman, Eliot (2009), The Winter Harvest Handbook: Year-Round Vegetable Production Using Deep-Organic Techniques and Unheated Greenhouses, Photography by Barbara Damrosch, Vermont, USA: Chelsea Green Publishing, ISBN 978-1603580816, OCLC 262883165.
