= Storage clamp =

Type of storage of agricultural products

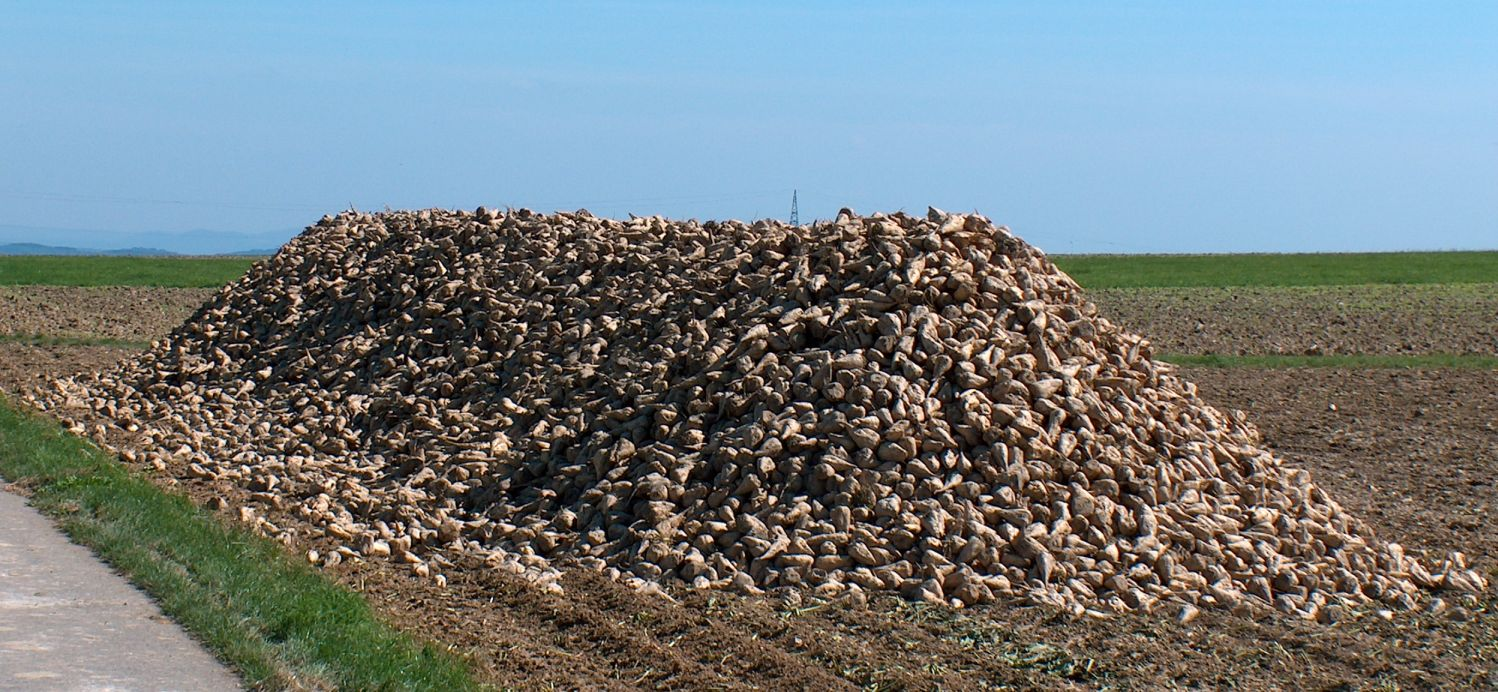
A clamp of sugar beet, not covered

A storage clamp is a compact heap, mound or pile of materials used in the agricultural industry for temporary storage of root crops such as potato, turnip, rutabaga, mangelwurzel, and sugar beet.

A clamp is formed by excavating a shallow rectangular depression in a field to make a base, with the earth scraped from the field reserved to use as cover. Root crops are then stacked to a height of about 2 m (6 ft 7 in) then covered to a depth of several inches. Straw or old hay may be used to protect the upper surface from rain erosion.

A well-made clamp will keep the vegetables cool and dry for many months. Most clamps are relatively long and narrow, allowing the crops to be progressively removed from one end without disturbing the remaining vegetables. The use of a clamp allows a farmer to feed vegetables into market over many months.

== See also ==
- Bunker silo – Structure for storing crops
- Prehistoric storage pits
- Food preservation – Inhibition of microbial growth in food
- Root cellar – Structure for storing vegetables, fruits, nuts or other foods
- Brick clamp – Open-air brick kiln
- Charcoal clamp – Covered fire for producing charcoal
- CLAMP – Manga artist group, an artist collective named after potato clamps
