= Brick clamp =

Open-air brick kiln

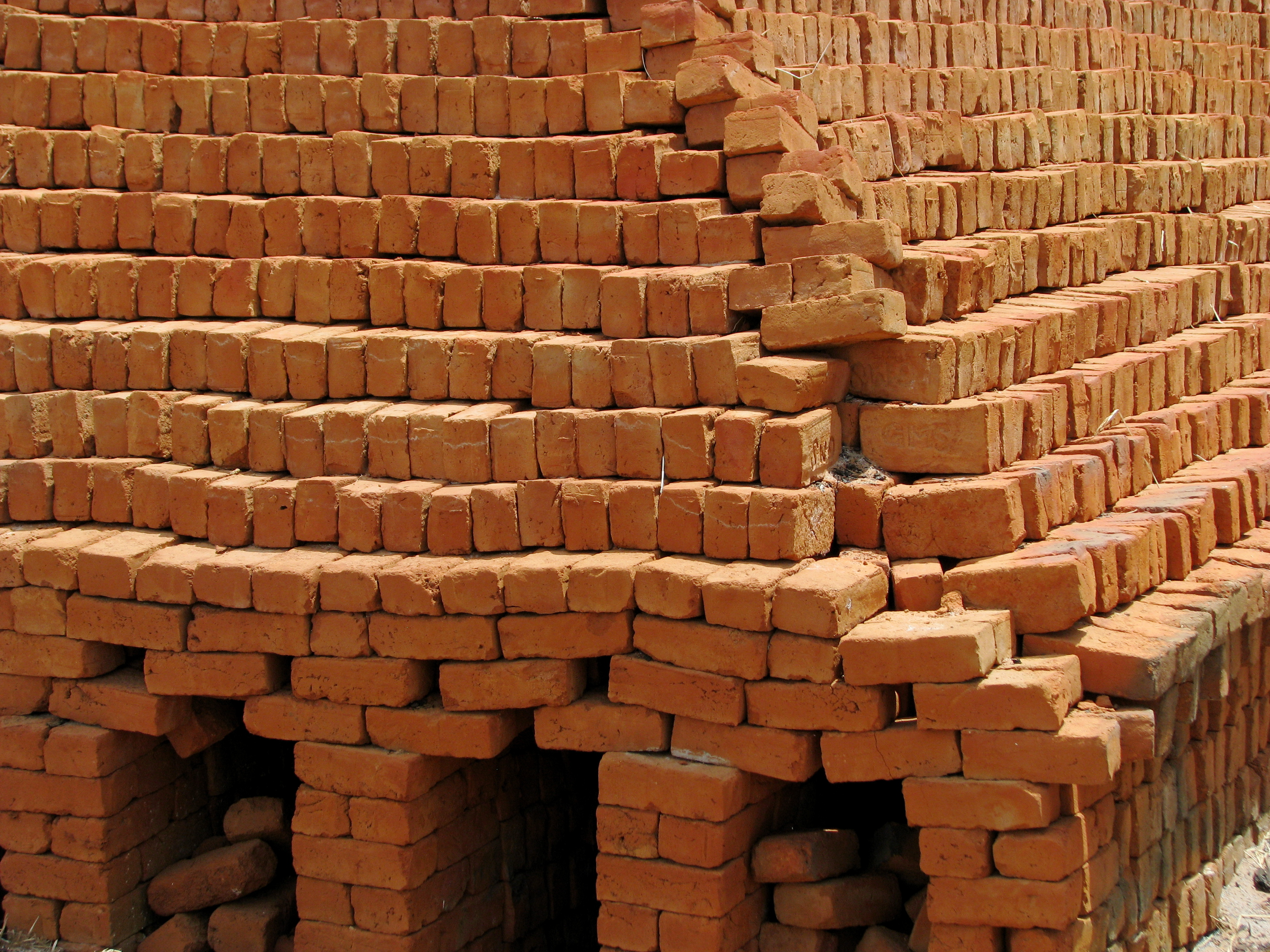
A brick clamp in rural India

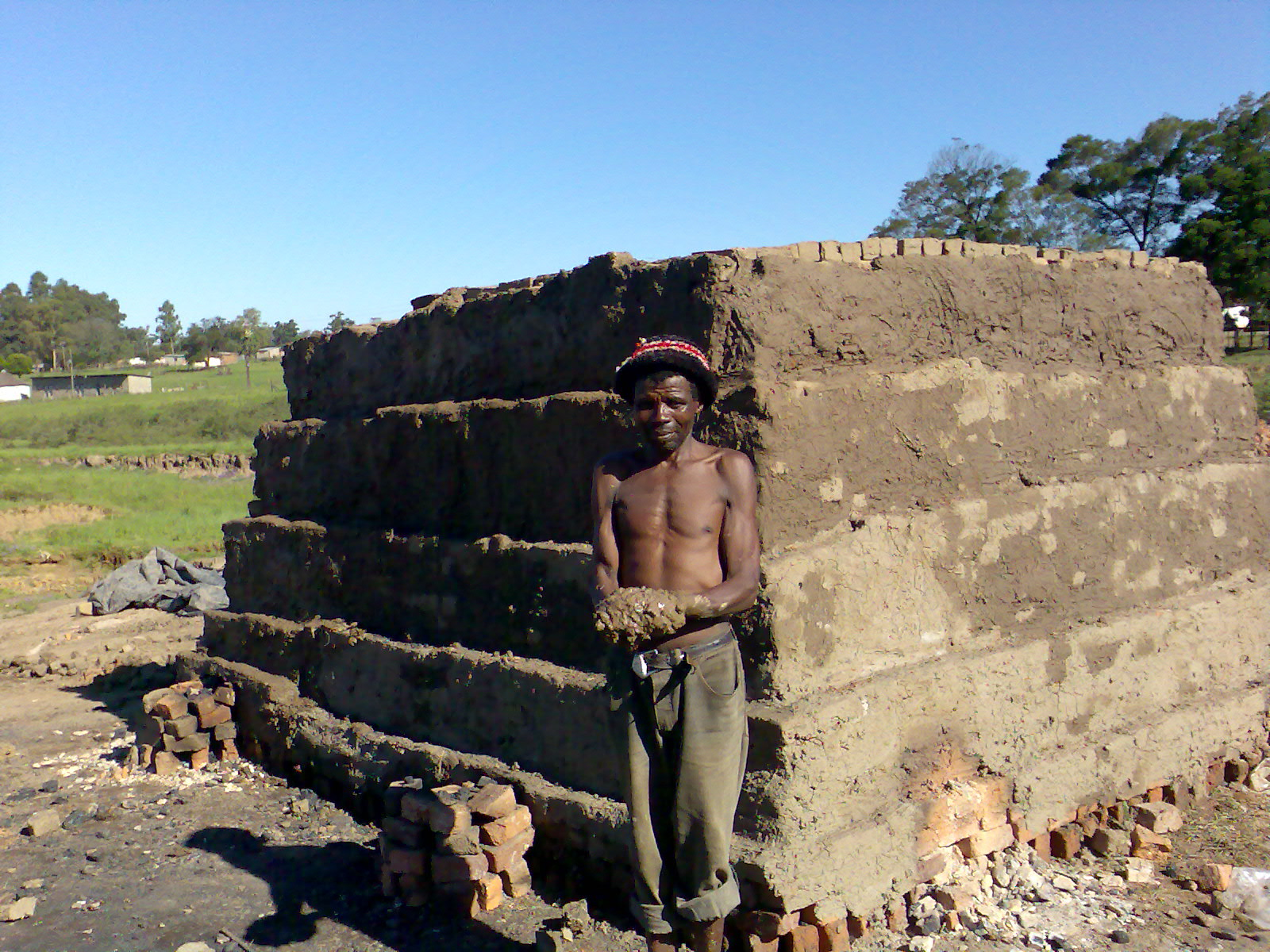
Xhosa brick maker at a scove kiln near Ngcobo, South Africa

"Brick clamp" also refers to a device (usually powered) to lift quantities of bricks.

A brick clamp is a traditional method of baking bricks, done by stacking unbaked bricks with fuel under or among them, then igniting the fuel. The clamp is considered a type of brick kiln. If the clamp is insulated by packing earth or mud around it, it becomes a scove kiln.

== See also ==
- Brickyard
- Brickworks – Factory where bricks are made
- Charcoal clamp – Covered fire for producing charcoal
- Storage clamp – Type of storage of agricultural products
