= Hoffmann kiln =

Series of batch process kilns

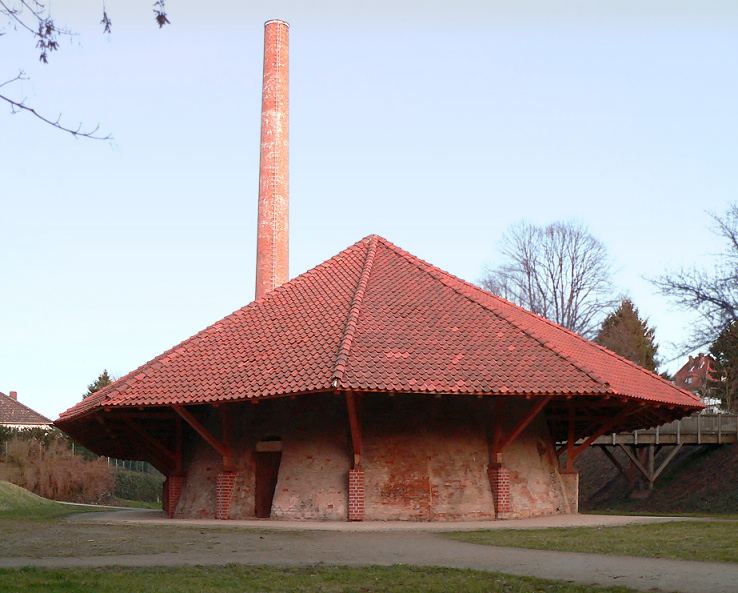
Lime kiln, Willy Spahn Park in Hannover

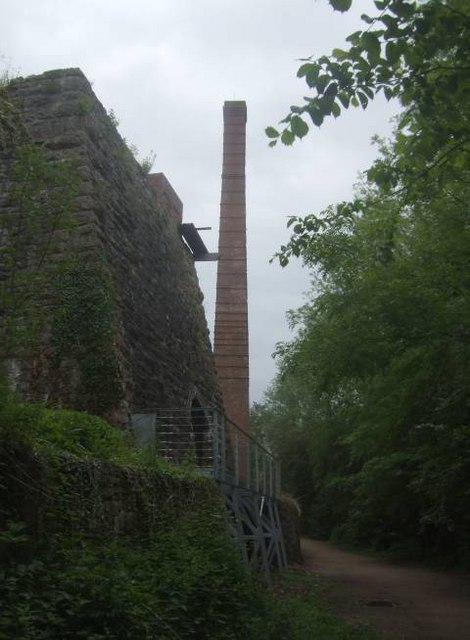
Lime kiln and chimney at Llanymynech Heritage Area, Shropshire photo: John M, geograph.org.uk

The Hoffmann kiln is a series of batch process kilns. Hoffmann kilns are the most common kiln used in production of bricks and some other ceramic products. Patented by German Friedrich Hoffmann for brickmaking in 1858, it was later used for lime-burning, and was known as the Hoffmann continuous kiln.

== Construction and operation ==
A Hoffmann kiln consists of a main fire passage surrounded on each side by several small rooms. Each room contains a pallet of bricks. In the main fire passage there is a fire wagon, that holds a fire that burns continuously. Each room is fired for a specific time, until the bricks are vitrified properly, and thereafter the fire wagon is rolled to the next room to be fired.

Each room is connected to the next room by a passageway carrying hot gases from the fire. In this way, the hottest gases are directed into the room that is currently being fired. Then the gases pass into the adjacent room that is scheduled to be fired next. There the gases preheat the brick. As the gases pass through the kiln circuit, they gradually cool as they transfer heat to the brick as it is preheated and dried. This is essentially a counter-current heat exchanger, which makes for a very efficient use of heat and fuel. This efficiency is a principal advantage of the Hoffmann kiln, and is one of the reasons for its original development and continued use throughout history. In addition to the inner opening to the fire passage, each room also has an outside door, through which recently fired brick is removed, and replaced with wet brick to be dried and then fired in the next firing cycle.

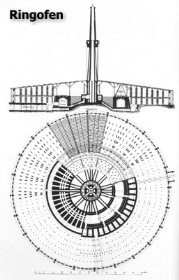
Cross-section of ring oven, Friedrich Eduard Hoffmann's patent, 1858

In a classic Hoffmann kiln, the fire may burn continuously for years, even decades; in Iran, there are kilns that are still active and have been working continuously for 35 years. Any fuel may be used in a Hoffmann kiln, including gasoline, natural gas, heavy petroleum and wood fuel. The dimensions of a typical Hoffmann kiln are completely variable, but in average about 5 m (height) x 15 m (width) x 150 m (length).

== Hoffmann kiln expansion ==
The first kiln of this class was put into operation on November 22, 1859 in Scholwin (since 1946, Skolwin), near Stettin, which was then part of Prussia. In 1867 there were already 250 of them, most in the Prussian part of Germany, fifty in England and three in France. In Italy, their expansion began in 1870, after being shown at the Paris Exhibition. In September 1870, the first brick factory according to Hoffmann's patent was inaugurated in Australia. The first continuous Hoffmann system kilns installed in Spain would have been in 1880, near Madrid. In 1900 there were already more than 4,000 kilns of this type, distributed throughout Europe, Russia, the Americas, Africa and even the East Indies. In 1904, an oven according to the patent of the British William Sercombe and based on the Hoffmann model began operating in Palmerston North, New Zealand. Hoffman kilns are still in use for brick production in some parts of the world, especially in places where labor costs are low and modern technology is not easily accessible.

== Historic examples of Hoffmann kilns ==
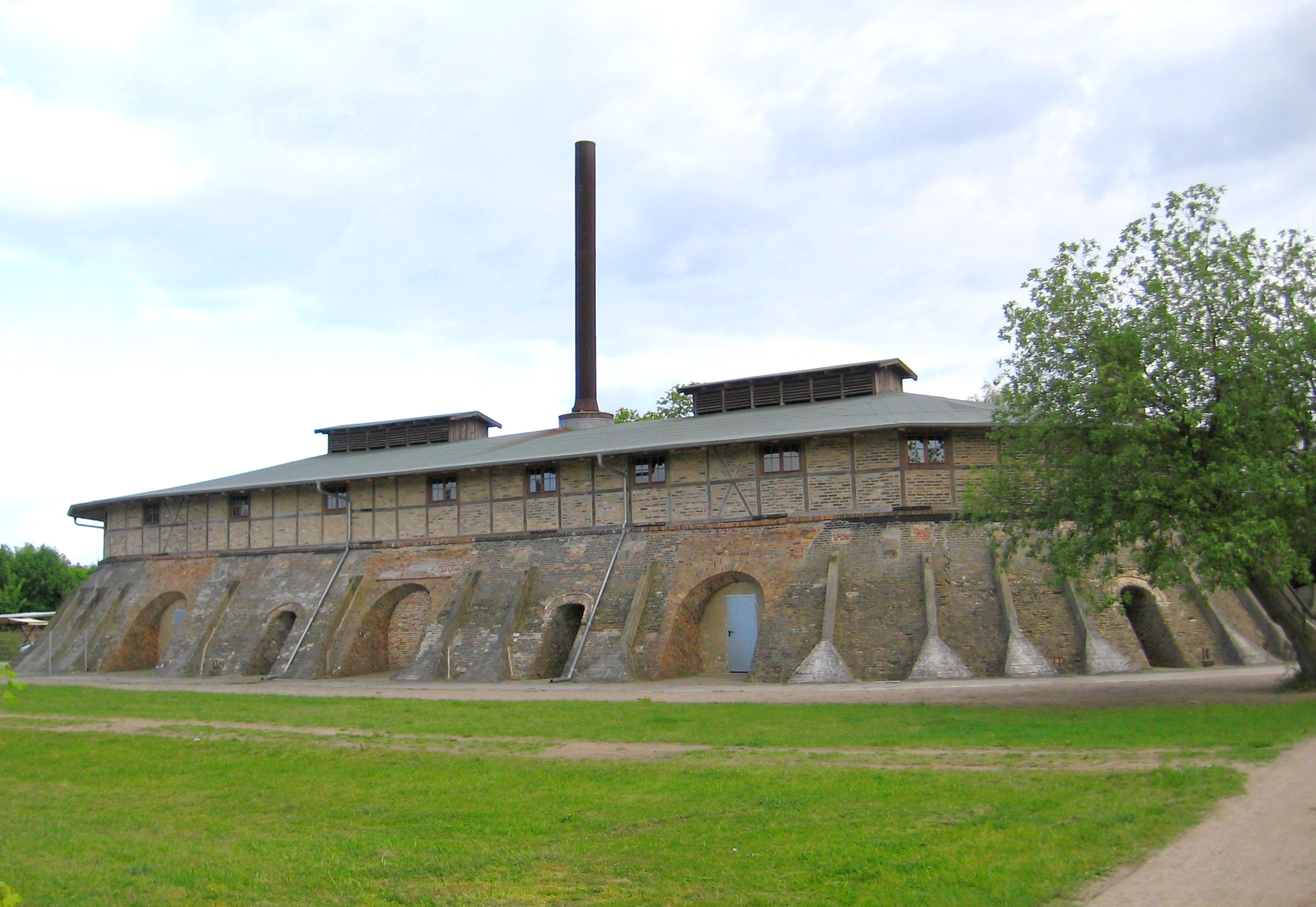
Hoffmann ring oven in Mildenberg museum

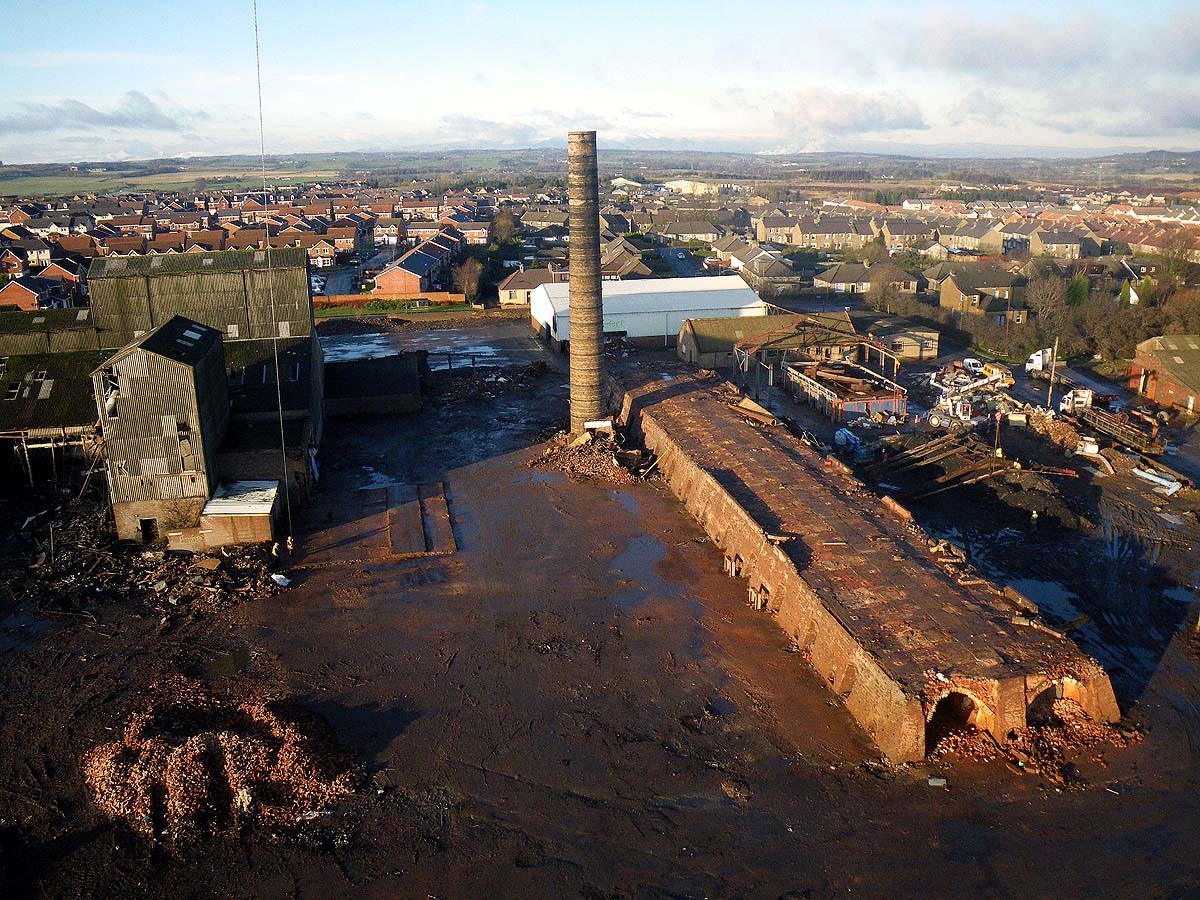
Kite aerial photo of a Hoffmann brick kiln during demolition in 2012, Armadale, West Lothian.

The Hoffmann kiln is used in almost every country.

=== UK ===
In the British Isles there are only a few Hoffmann kilns remaining, some of which have been preserved.

The only ones with a chimney are at Prestongrange Industrial Heritage Museum and Llanymynech Heritage Area. The site at Llanymynech, close to Oswestry was used for lime-burning and has recently been partially restored as part of an industrial archaeology conservation project supported by English Heritage and the Heritage Lottery Fund.

Two examples in North Yorkshire, the Hoffmann lime-burning kiln at Meal Bank Quarry, Ingleton, and that at the former Craven and Murgatroyd lime works, Langcliffe, are scheduled ancient monuments.

There is an intact but abandoned Hoffmann kiln without a chimney present at Minera Limeworks; the site is abandoned but all entrances to the kiln have been grated-off, preventing access. The kiln is in a very poor state of repair, with trees growing out of the walls and the roof. Minera Quarry Trust hopes one day to develop the area into something of a tourist attraction. The Grade II listed Hoffmann brick kiln in Ilkeston, Derbyshire, is also badly neglected, although the recently installed fencing offers some protection for the building and for visitors.

At Prestongrange Museum, outside Prestonpans in East Lothian, the Hoffman kiln is still standing and visitors can listen to more about it via a mobile phone tour.

There is a nearly complete kiln in Horeb, Carmarthenshire.

There is still a working kiln at Kings Dyke in Peterborough, which is the last site of the London Brick Company, owned by Forterra PLC.

There is an example of A hoffman kiln in sheffield Between Aizlewood road & cutts terrace which was granted English heritage scheduled monument status in 2003 https://www.planning.data.gov.uk/entity/13919248#json

=== Australia ===
In Victoria, Australia, at the Brunswick brickworks, there are two surviving kilns converted to residences, and a chimney from a third kiln; there is another in Box Hill, Victoria; also in Melbourne.

In Adelaide, South Australia, the last remaining Hoffman kiln in the state is in at the old Hallett Brickworks site in Torrensville.

There is one at St Peters in Sydney, New South Wales.

In Western Australia, the kiln at the Maylands Brickworks in the Perth suburb of Maylands, which operated from 1927 to 1982 is the only remaining Hoffman kiln in the state.

=== Catalonia ===
- Bòbila de Bellamar a Calafell.

=== Other countries ===
There is a complete kiln in the restored Tsalapatas brick Factory in Volos Greece that has been converted to an industrial museum.

There are two in New Zealand.

Kaohsiung city in Taiwan is also home to a Hoffman kiln, built by the Japanese government in 1899.
