= Brickfield =

Places where bricks are made

A brickfield is a field or other open site where bricks are made. Land may be leased by an owner to a brickmaster, by whom the manufacture of bricks may be conducted. Historically, the topsoil was typically removed and the clay beneath was stripped and mixed with chalk and ash to make bricks.

In pre-19th-century England, [i]n most areas the brickfield owner hired a brickmaster at a price per thousand bricks to superintend the site and take full responsibility for the output of the operations. He in turn contracted with moulders to temper, mould and hack the bricks. Each moulder then hired his own 'gang' of subsidiary labourers and acted as their employer.

Subsequently, the field (if not too damaged ecologically) could be used for horticulture. In Kent such fields were often planted with fruit trees. Brickfields were mainly created from 1770 to 1881, when a new shaly clay was discovered at Fletton. This period coincided with the housing and railway boom in London and cheap river-transport in Thames sailing barges. Brickfields existed elsewhere, but often the clay layer was deeper or there was no chalk nearby. In modern times bricks are made at a brickworks.

"Brickyard" can serve as a synonym of "brickfield".

Brickfield or Brickfields became a common place name in southeast England.

== Geology ==
The southeast of England consists of rock strata that are more recent than most of Great Britain. It consists of a large denuded anticline, an anticline that has been eroded away leaving a series of escarpments separated by low lying vales, The Cretaceous ridges are known as the North Downs and South Downs. The Downs have been cut through, with the Medway Valley being the most prominent. The Hoo peninsula is an Eocene (Thanet sands) ridge. The London basin is an Eocene structure composed of London Clay. All this solid geology is covered with a layer of brown structureless loam (Head), and muds deposited by the rivers. Both the head and the fluvial mud are called brickearth. Water is also needed, the rivers are saline so wells and boreholes need to be dug through the three Cretaceous chalk layers to the impermeable Gault Clay.

Taking the parish of Frindsbury as a referenced example: about 1 foot (0.30 m) of acidic topsoil covers about 6 feet (1.8 m) of head, which lies on the alkaline Thanet Sands. There are five layers of sands with different properties – the light grey sands are themselves marketable and are used in the brickmaking process, and as moulding sand for metal foundries.

== Process ==
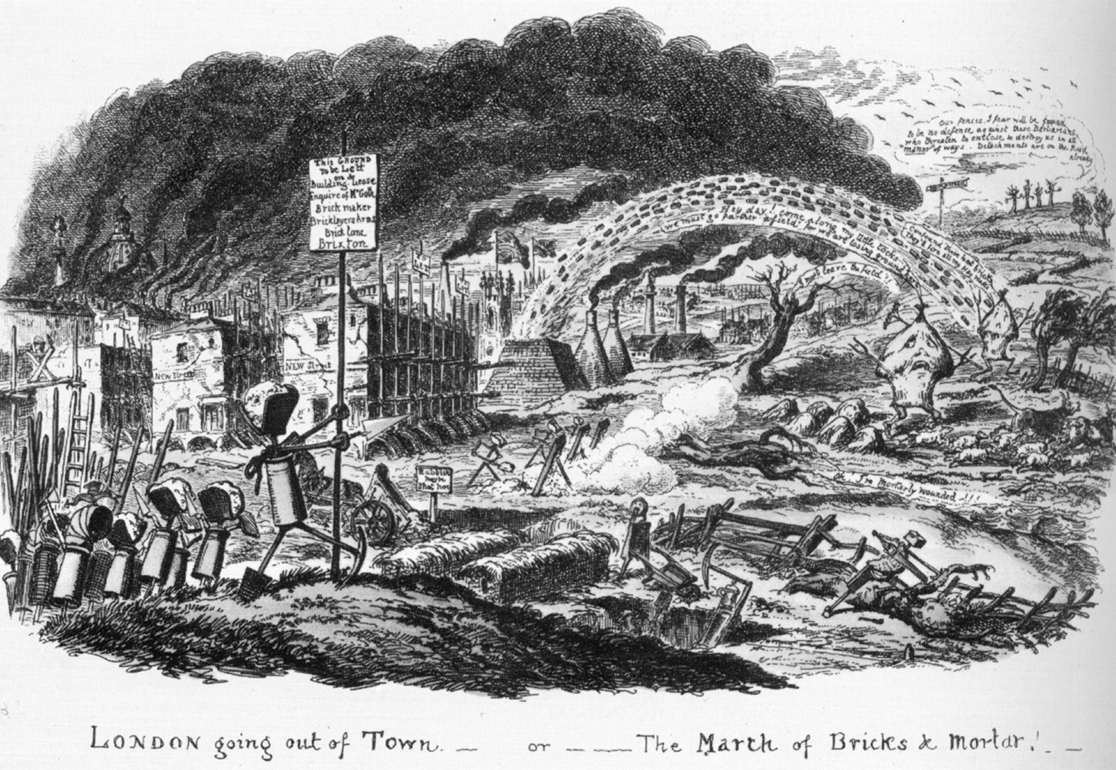
George Cruikshank's 1829 etching London Going out of Town – or The March of Bricks & Mortar! shows the expansion of 19th century London as an invasion of the countryside by an army made of building materials, such as chimney pots, hods, picks and shovels. A continuous barrage of newly made bricks is discharged from a kiln.

A field was leased from the farmer and it was 'uncallowed' (the topsoil removed). The soil had been farmed and in the Medway area it had been chalked every five years with 'fat chalk' extracted from the 'dene holes'. The head, or clay was now dug from the field in winter by workers (diggers) on piecework rates. This was calculated on the volume extracted. 44 ft by 8 ft by 6 ft would make 33000 bricks. The dug clay was left exposed in heaps to weather.

=== Washmill ===
The washmill was usually a sunken circular pit that was brick lined. It was 4 feet (1.2 m) deep, and 15 feet (4.6 m) in diameter. A horse pulled a centrally pivoted beam with rakes that broke up the weathered clay and mixed it into a slurry. It was here that the correct proportion of chalk, some river mud and even rags were added. The rags would help the combustion. Clay alone would be too brittle. The popular Kentish yellows (London stock bricks) used 10-17% of chalk. The surface of the porous yellow stock, reacted chemically with the sulphur dioxide in the polluted air to form an impermeable glaze as well as an attractive colour.

=== Washback ===
When the liquid slurry was ready it was 'laundered' along wooden pipes into square washbacks, the water seeped away leaving a stiff clay mix . This process was dependent on the weather.

=== Brickmoulding ===
The brickmaking was done by 'gangs' of persons who were usually a family unit. They each had a 'berth', situated in front of a washback. It contained a bench with a pugmill behind. The pugmill had an inlet hopper, and moved the clay mix along a six-foot tube using an Archimedes screw. The pugging process cut up the clay and made it more pliable. Pugmills were attached to a power source by lineshafts and belting.

The gang consisted of a 'temperer', who cut the clay out of the washback and loaded it into a wheeled barrow, and took it to the berth where he emptied it into the hopper. The 'flatie' took the extruded clay and rolled it in sand, and handed it to the moulder. The moulder had a rectangular mould that he sprinkled with sand, that slotted onto a base on the bench. The clay was thrown into the mould with great force. That done, tapping the mould released the newly formed brick (green brick). They were removed from the bench by the 'off bearer' who stacked them next to the bench. A 'barrow loader' stacked 30 green bricks in a barrow. The 'pusher outer' wheeled the green bricks to a 'hack' where they would dry off. The hack would contain 1000 bricks stacked on boards, seven courses high. These were dried for 5 weeks losing about 2 pounds (0.91 kg) in weight- these were now called 'white bricks'.

=== Cowl ===
The traditional method of firing bricks was to use a cowl (or clamp). A cowl was a stack of 750 'white bricks' laid on edge, and about 6 inches (15 cm) apart leaving channels for the fuel. The stack would be 32 courses high. The white brick stack was covered with rejected bricks that would help retain the heat. The fuel was known as 'rough stuff' or 'London mixture'. It was made in winter by 'scrying' sifting out the half burnt coal from domestic rubbish which had been retrieved from London by barge, then left to rot for a year or so. The finer ash was added to the slurry, and the larger remains used in the cowls. The cowl was fired and a 'scintler' moved outer bricks during the firing to aid airflow. The centre of the cowl fired at 900 deg C. When the firing was complete, 'sorters' dismantled the cowl. Bricks were sorted into:

- First stocks – yellow facings
- Second stocks – straw facings
- Third stocks – interior walls
- Roughs – used for footings
- Burrs – used for hardcore
- Chuffs – rejected

Later, in the larger brickfields these cowls were replaced by permanent kilns.

=== Scotch kilns ===
The updraught kiln, also called a Scotch Kiln, was rectangular and open-topped with fire holes along the bottom; it was a permanent cowl. It was filled with bricks and it allowed the hot gases to rise amongst them. The downdraught kiln was circular and about 15 ft in diameter; the hot gases rose but were deflected back down onto the bricks. This was more efficient in fuel consumption; opening ports in the roof allowed more fuel to be introduced during the firing when necessary. The Hoffmann Continuous Kiln was the first move towards mass production. It was a series of downdraught kilns, connected in a circle or in a long rectangle. Each kiln had an access channel to the next so as soon as the one kiln was fully firing process, the waste heat would begin to fire the next. The fires would thus burn around in sequence. When the firing was complete, the bricks had time to cool before they were removed. the kiln was reloaded with green bricks and in turn the kiln would be fired once more. There was always an empty kiln ready to take fresh green bricks so production was not interrupted by waiting for a firing to be completed. A kiln of this type is still in use at a brickworks in Rainham. The next development was the Long Continuous Kiln where bricks were stacked on flat wagons which were slowly passed through a chamber where hot gases could circulate around them.

== Brickmakers ==
- Eastwoods – Medway.
- London Brick Company
