= Program on Energy Efficiency in Artisanal Brick Kilns in Latin America to Mitigate Climate Change =

The Program on Energy Efficiency in Artisanal Brick Kilns in Latin America to Mitigate Climate Change (EELA) is a program of the Swiss Agency for Development and Cooperation (SDC) which is implemented by Swiss contact in conjunction with its partners in nine countries in Latin America. The objective is to mitigate climate change through the reduction of greenhouse gas emissions in Latin America and to improve the quality of life of the population in the areas of intervention.

== The problem ==
Artisanal brick producers in Latin America use fuel with high environmental impact in kilns with low energy efficiency. Wood, tires and plastics, among other fuels, are used to fire bricks, contributing to air pollution and deforestation as well as increasing the causes of climate change. Despite their contribution to the construction industry and the generation of jobs, artisanal brick producers largely operate informally and are generally excluded from social, environmental and economic public policies.

== The approach ==
The EELA program is focused on developing management models for artisanal brick producers, and includes activities that range from the adoption of more efficient production processes that require less fuel and emit less greenhouse gases, to the creation of new products that use less raw materials.

== EELA activities ==
- Innovation through the introduction of technologies that reduce greenhouse gas emissions and are financially viable for artisanal brick producers.
- Working in coordination with public bodies to incorporate the artisanal brick production sector within the national climate change mitigation agenda.
- Taking account of lessons learned within the countries, and promoting the exchange of experiences among them.

== Areas of operation ==
EELA began its first phase working with 970 artisanal brick producers in seven areas located in San Juan (Argentina), Cochabamba (Bolivia), Serido (Brazil), Nemocon (Colombia), Cuenca (Ecuador), Leon (Mexico) and Cusco (Peru). In 2012, Nicaragua and Honduras joined the initiative. The experience gained in the pilot areas will serve as a basis to expand EELA’s intervention at a national level.

== Aims ==
EELA hopes to reduce the GHG emissions of artisanal brick producers in the countries of operation by 30% and increase their income by 10%.

== Artisanal brick producers in San Jeronimo, Cusco, Peru ==
In conjunction with the Ministry of Production, the Regional Directorate of Production and the Municipality of San Jeronimo, EELA works to promote good manufacturing practices to better employ heat as well as provide technical assistance in the following areas:

- Mixers designed to optimize time and resources
- Extrusion machinery to use less raw materials and diversify production
- Fans to make kiln combustion more effective

EELA constructed a downdraft kiln that is more efficient than a traditional kiln and that is affordable for an artisanal brick producer. The kiln is being replicated by brick producers in San Jerónimo, Cuenca (Ecuador) and in Mexico.

== Challenges ==
In a second phase, EELA will seek to improve the management models through the use of knowledge gained from its first phase.

== Joint effort ==
EELA is supported by a group of partners that includes both public and private entities with experience in the brick sector, in each of the countries in which it operates.

== See also ==
- Brickworks
- Climate change mitigation
- Sustainable building
