= Brickyard =

Factory for manufacturing bricks

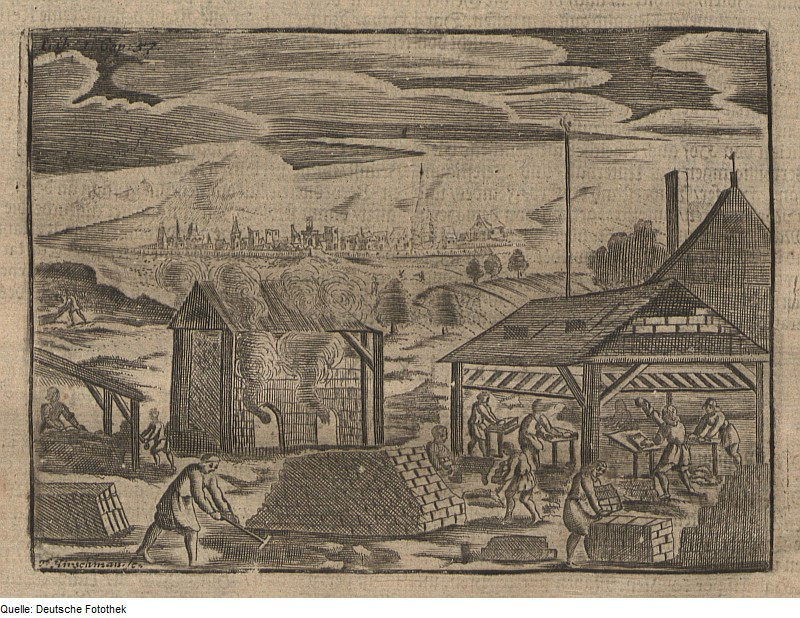
Illustration of workers in a brickyard from Germany, 1695

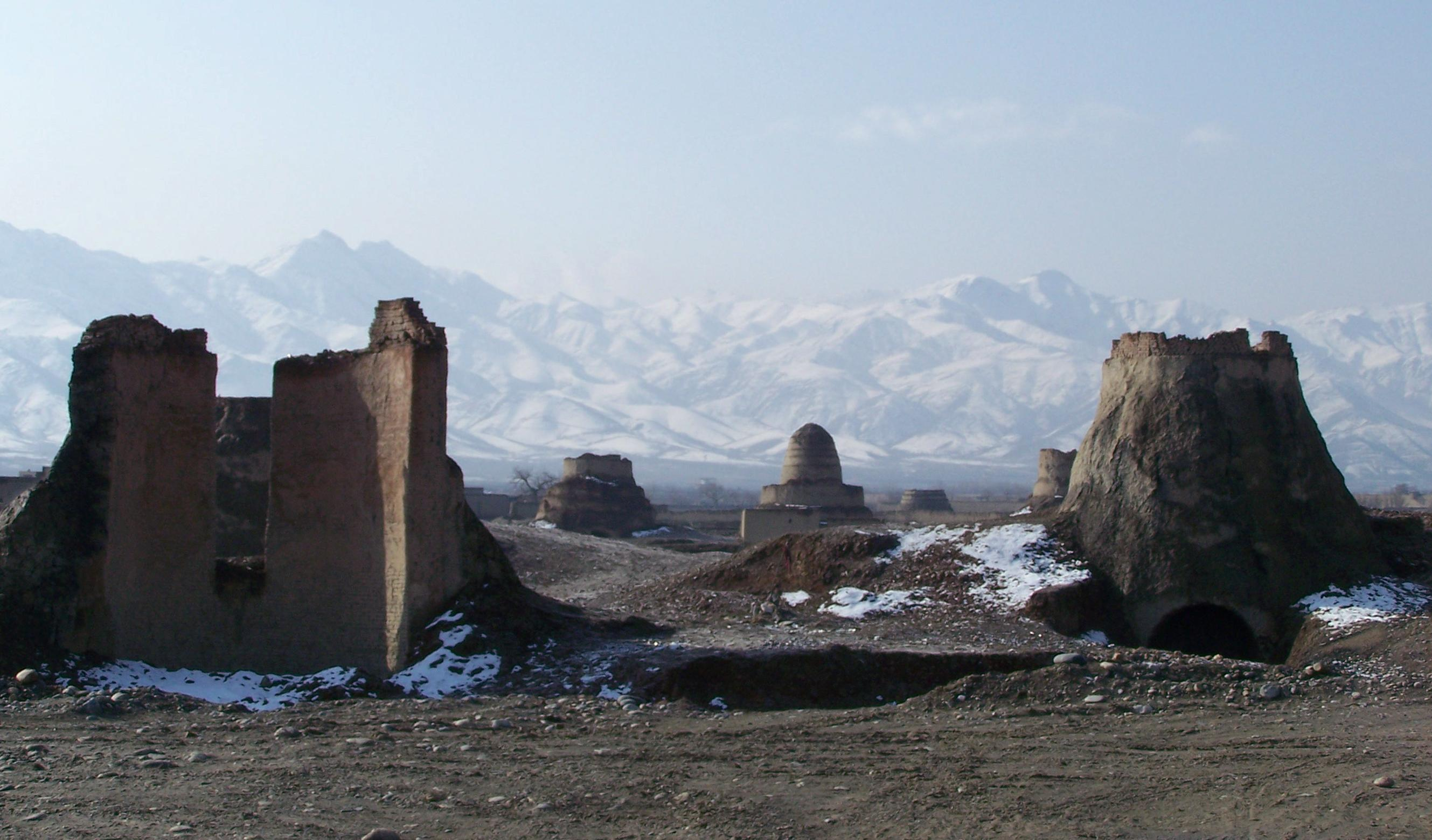
Domed kilns on ancient brickyards in Kabul

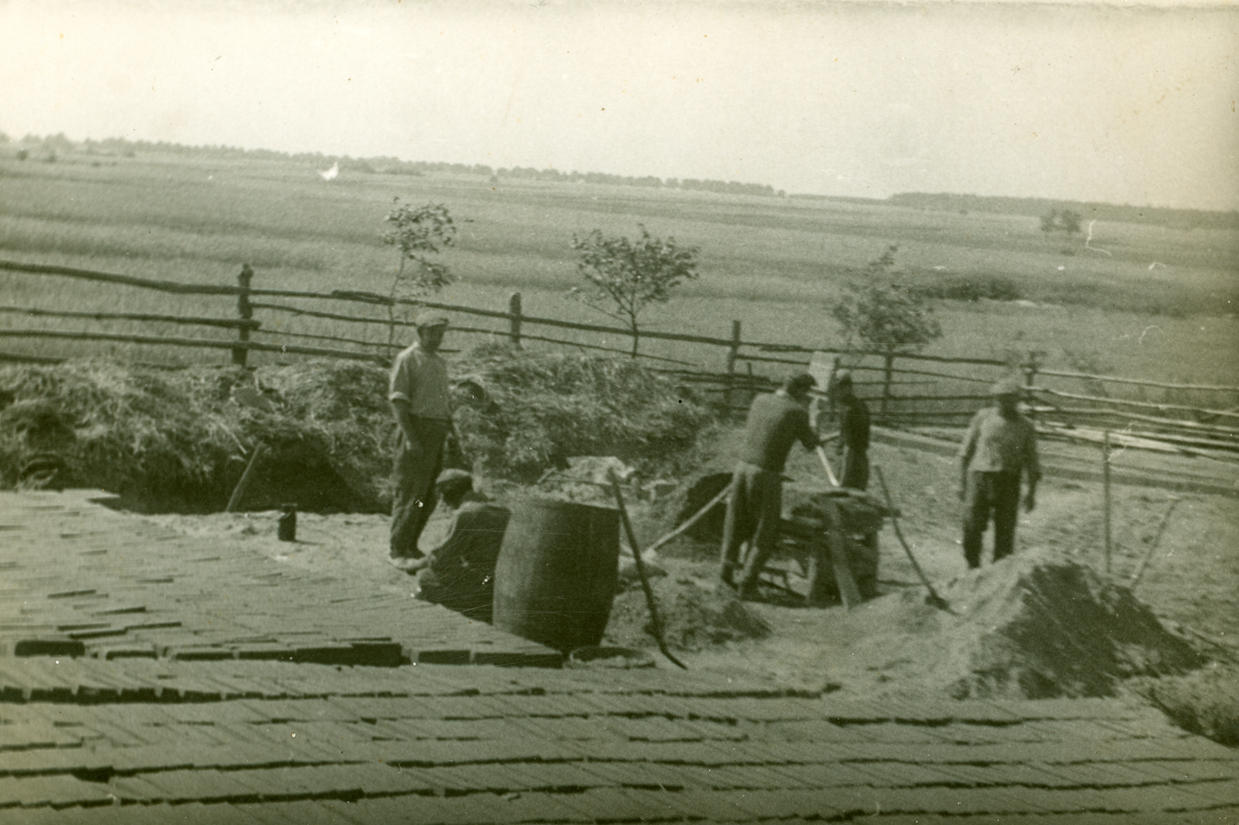
A brickyard in postwar Poland

Roman military brick factory in Northern Hungary, near the Danube Bend

A brickyard or brickfield is a place or yard where bricks are made, fired, and stored, or sometimes sold or otherwise distributed from. Brick makers work in a brick yard. A brick yard may be constructed near natural sources of clay or on or near a construction site if necessity or design requires the bricks to be made locally.

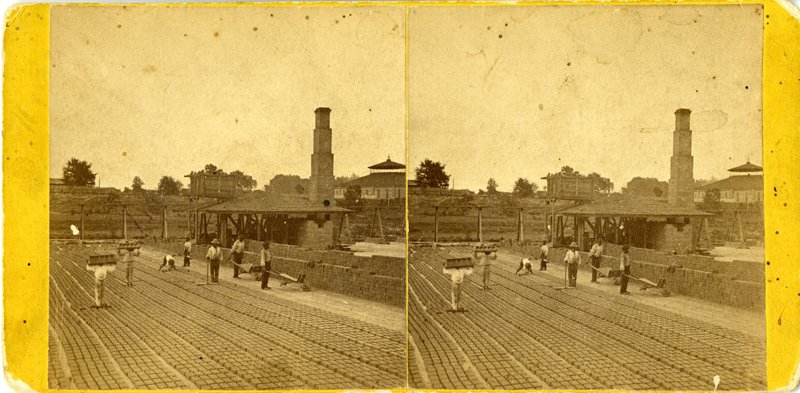
A brickyard in Macon, GA, c.1877

Brickfield and Brickfields became common place names for former brickfields in south east England. The children's building toy called "Brickyard" (stylized as BRICKYaRD) is named after the place.

== See also ==
- Brick clamp – Open-air brick kiln
- Brickworks, another type of place where bricks are made, often on a larger scale, and with mechanization
- Clay pit, a quarry or mine for clay
- Kiln, the type of high heat oven that bricks are baked in
