= Forterra plc =

British manufacturer of building products

- Formerly: Hanson Building Products
- Company type: Public
- Traded as: LSE: FORT
- Industry: Construction Materials
- Founder: Hanson
- Headquarters: Northampton, England
- Key people: Justin Atkinson, (Chairman); Neil Ash, (CEO)
- Revenue: ▲£386.0 million (2025)
- Operating income: ▼£29.3 million (2025)
- Net income: ▼£17.0 million (2025)
- Website: www.forterra.co.uk

Forterra (formerly Hanson Building Products) is a manufacturer of building products for the United Kingdom's construction industry. It is listed on the London Stock Exchange.

Forterra was originally founded as the building products division of Hanson Plc. Early expansion was driven by a series of acquisitions, such as of The Butterley Company, London Brick, and Marshalls Clay Products. Hanson's acquisition by the German building materials company HeidelbergCement in 2007 included the division; during 2015, HeibelbergCement divested Hanson Building Products along with Hanson’s North American building products business, selling it to the American private equity firm Lone Star Funds. Shortly thereafter, the Forterra name was adopted and the firm was first listed on the London Stock Exchange in April 2016.

Forterra's activities have been heavily influenced by the performance of the wider construction industry, particularly the housebuilders. In 2016, the firm was considering mothballing two of its nine UK-based plants in response to diminished demand. It bought the Derbyshire-based concrete company Bison Manufacturing from the construction firm Laing O'Rourke during 2017. A sharp downturn in demand was experienced during the COVID-19 pandemic, Forterra experienced a sharp downturn in the demand that led to profit warnings and the threat of job losses being raised. Throughout the early 2020s, prices rose repeatedly as a result of inflation and cost increases. Cost pressures have led to restructuring and production being scaled back.

== History ==
Forterra was formed as Hanson Building Products as the building products division of Hanson Plc. It has acquired numerous other companies during its existence, including The Butterley Company in 1968, London Brick in 1984, Red Bank Manufacturing Company and Marshalls Flooring in 2002, Marshalls Clay Products and Thermalite in 2005, and Formpave Holdings in 2006.

In September 2007, Hanson was acquired by the German building materials company HeidelbergCement; eight years later, HeibelbergCement opted to sell the company and Hanson’s North American building products business to the American private equity firm Lone Star Funds in exchange for $1.4 billion. Later that same year, Hanson Building Products was rebranded as Forterra plc. The firm was first listed on the London Stock Exchange in April 2016.

During July 2016, Forterra announced that, as a result of economic uncertainty and sufficient brick inventory levels, the firm was considering the temporary closure of its plants in Accrington and Claughton, Lancashire, comprising two of its nine British-based brick manufacturing facilities, which had a combined annual production capacity of roughly 570 million bricks. In early 2017, Forterra reported that annual profit and sales had both risen, which it attributed to activity within the housebuilding sector. During July 2017, it purchased the Derbyshire-based pre-cast concrete specialist Bison Manufacturing from the construction company Laing O'Rourke in exchange for £20 million; furthermore, Laing O’Rourke and Forterra agreed at the time to collaborate on product development in this sector.

In mid-2020, amid the COVID-19 pandemic, Forterra experienced a sharp downturn in the demand that led to the firm's management considering the loss of over a hundred jobs. During July 2021, the company issued a public warning that, due to a combination of factors, including material, labour and transportation, their sales performance could be negatively impacted during the latter half of the year. By the start of 2022, Forterra had increased the price of its bricks by more than 10 per cent and had openly stated that further price increases could be implemented; the start of the Russian invasion of Ukraine in February 2022 also added further pressure on the market. During May 2022, after a decade in charge of Forterra, chief executive Stephen Harrison announced his intention to step down. Later that same year, further prices increases were implemented as a result of cost inflation.

By May 2023, the company was experiencing the consequences of a downturn in the housebuilding sector, which included a decrease in turnover being recorded. Two months later, the company was in the process of scaling back its production activities as well as consulting on the restructuring of its commercial and support functions. During November 2024, Forterra was holding talks with customers on planned price increases amid rising inflation and labor costs.

== Operations ==
Forterra's brands include Cradley, Ecostock, Formpave, Jetfloor, London Brick and Thermalite blocks. During 2018, the firm produced more than 25 percent of all the bricks made in Britain that year.
