= London Brick Company =

British brickmaking company

London Brick Company Ltd
- Company type: Private
- Industry: Brickmaking
- Founded: 1900; 126 years ago
- Founder: John Cathles Hill
- Headquarters: Stewartby, Bedfordshire, England
- Products: Bricks and paviors
- Number of employees: 200
- Parent: Forterra plc
- Website: londonbrick.co.uk

The London Brick Company, owned by Forterra plc, is a British manufacturer of bricks.

== History ==
The London Brick Company owes its origins to John Cathles Hill, a developer-architect who built houses in London and Peterborough. In 1889, Hill bought the small T.W. Hardy & Sons brickyard at Fletton in Peterborough, and the business was incorporated as the London Brick Company in 1900. "Fletton" is the generic name given to bricks made from lower Oxford clay which have a low fuel cost due to the carbonaceous content of the clay. Hill ran into financial difficulties and, in 1912, a receiver was appointed to run London Brick. Hill died in 1915, but after the receiver was discharged in 1919, Hill's son continued to run the company.

The capital intensive Fletton brick industry suffered from substantial variations in demand. After the First World War, amalgamations were proposed. In 1923, London Brick merged with Malcolm Stewart's B.J. Forder, who, along with London Brick, was one of the four main groupings in the Fletton brick industry.

The new company, for a while called L.B.C. & Forders, went on to acquire other brick firms in the end of the 1920s, giving it a dominant position in the Fletton brick industry. By 1931, the company was making a billion bricks a year. In 1935, output exceeded 1.5 billion bricks, or 60 per cent of the Fletton brick industry output, and peak pre war output reached 1.75 billion bricks.

During the post war housing boom, Fletton brick sales increased, reaching a peak in 1967. Brick sales then began to decline, and the company diversified. London Brick Landfill was formed, and it began the tipping of household and industrial refuse into the old clay pits in the Marston Vale area. London Brick Landfill was merged into Shanks Group in 1988.

Between 1968 and 1971, The London Brick Company also bought its three remaining Fletton brick competitors, including the Marston Valley Brick Company, giving it a total monopoly in the Fletton brick market. In 1973, its brick sales totalled 2.88 billion, or 43 per cent of the total brick market.

In 1984, the company was acquired by Hanson plc. In February 2008, Hanson closed brickmaking operations at Stewartby in Marston Vale owing to problems with meeting sulphur emission regulations in the United Kingdom, even though it met the EU regulations. Production of Fletton brick is now concentrated at Peterborough, while the Marston Vale site is being redeveloped for housing.

As of 2010, the brick market stood at 1.5 billion, with Fletton brick accounting for less than 10 per cent.

== Italian influence ==
Many Italian families from the southern regions of Apulia and Campania came to Bedford in the 1950s to work in the Stewartby brickworks in Marston Vale, and Peterborough to work in the Fletton brickworks.

== Indian community ==
In addition to the Italian communities, workers from the Punjab region of India arrived in the 1950s and 1960s to work at the Stewartby brickworks, with 106 Pakistanis, 154 Indians and 46 West Indians working at the site by 1967.

== Operations ==
The company estimates that 5 million houses in the United Kingdom are built using Fletton brick.
