= East West Rail =

Oxford–Cambridge main line under construction

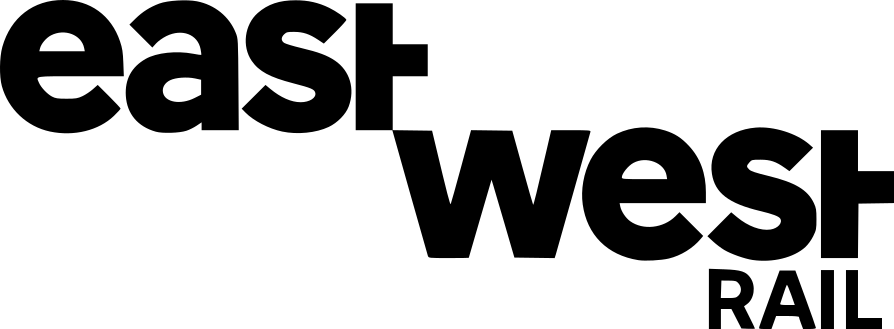

- Map of the western and central sections
- Location: Oxfordshire; Buckinghamshire; Bedfordshire; Cambridgeshire
- Proposer: East West Main Line Partnership
- Project website: eastwestrail.co.uk
- Status: Oxford–Bletchley: Undergoing testing; Bletchley–Bedford: Upgrade planned; Bedford–Cambridge: Route under investigation
- Type: Railway
- Cost estimate: £1.085 billion (Bicester–Bedford plus Aylesbury spur)
- Completion date: Oxford–Bletchley/Milton Keynes: 2025; Bedford–Cambridge: "early 2030s"
- OpenStreetMap: 16675395

East West Rail (or the East West Main Line, EWML) is a strategic aim to establish a new main line railway between East Anglia and Oxfordshire. The immediate plan is to build (or rebuild) a line linking Oxford and Cambridge via Bicester, Milton Keynes (at Bletchley) and Bedford, largely using the trackbed of the former Varsity Line. Thus it provides a potential route between any or all of the Great Western, Cotswold, Chiltern, West Coast, Midland, East Coast, West Anglia and Great Eastern main lines, avoiding London. The government approved the western section (between Oxford and Bedford) in November 2011. The eastern section (east of Cambridge), the new Bedford–Cambridge route and the Oxford–Bedford improvements are categorised as a nationally significant infrastructure project.

The line was initially promoted (as the East West Rail Link) by the East-West Rail Consortium, a consortium of local authorities and interested bodies along the route. (That consortium is now called the East West Main Line Partnership.) In 2013 it was adopted by the Department for Transport and, in late 2017, the government announced that it would be delivered by a quango, the East West Railway Company, rather than by Network Rail.

The plan is divided into three sections:

- "Western section" between Oxford and Bedford on the former Varsity Line route, taking advantage of the recently reconstructed Oxford–Bicester line and the existing Bletchley–Bedford Marston Vale line (leaving just Bicester–Bletchley to be rebuilt). (Note: the original scope of this section included a branch line to Aylesbury: In May 2023, the EWR Company announced that this branch was not being funded.)
- "Central section" from Bedford to Cambridge over a substantially new alignment; in May 2023, the Company announced its preferred route for statutory consultation.
- "Eastern section" from Cambridge to Norwich, Felixstowe and Ipswich on existing lines.

== Summary of current status (Summer 2026) ==
Phase 1 of the western section, the segment from Oxford via Bicester Village to the junction with the Chiltern Main Line, has been operational since December 2016. In April 2020, engineering work began on the route of the Bicester–Bletchley segment. Trackwork was completed in early 2024; freight services began using the route in June 2025. Passenger services between Oxford and Milton Keynes Central were to begin in the second half of 2025, but a dispute with the rail unions (over a proposal for driver-only operation) continues to prevent commencement of the service.

Engineering work to bring the Bletchley–Bedford segment up to the same standard was planned for 2025–2030, but a dispute over the nature and extent of the route through Bedford has yet to be resolved. In January 2025, the Government confirmed funding for the Bedford–Cambridge section, including specifically a new Tempsford railway station that is also to serve the East Coast Main Line.

On 4 March 2026, 500 days had passed since the line between Bicester and Bletchley was declared ready for use but a scheduled passenger service had yet to commence. Meanwhile the line is being used regularly for freight movements. In a written reply on 4 June 2026 to a parliamentary question, the rail minister stated that provision would be made in the December 2026 timetable for an Oxford–Milton Keynes Central service – but made no commitment as to when or whether it would actually commence.

== History ==
=== Origins ===
The link is promoted by the East West Rail Main Line Partnership, an association of local authorities originally called the "East West Rail Consortium", initiated by Ipswich Borough Council in 1995. The council and its neighbours were particularly concerned about poor services within East Anglia and the links to London. Some success was achieved east of Cambridge, at least partly through the efforts of the group.

In April 2006, the Office of the Deputy Prime Minister reported itself to be in favour of the principle of re-opening the link between Bedford and Oxford.

In May 2006, the Department for Transport (DfT) announced specific plans for Bletchley railway station. The document stated that "it is likely" that Bletchley area renewals and network simplification will take place "by 2010", "to include a high-level platform" for Bedford trains. "The network will be suitable for the later addition of any 'East-West' link to and from Oxford and for the operation of through links from either Oxford or Bedford to and from Milton Keynes".

In March 2007, a study (funded by the East West Rail Consortium) stated that

A very good operating and business case exists for the “Base Case” 2tph passenger service between Oxford and Milton Keynes, and an operating case also exists for the Aylesbury spur which would bring further economic and strategic advantages to the sub- region. Capital cost for the base case is between £100m - £135m. The base case and the Aylesbury options should be further considered in the next phase of work.

In April 2008, the DfT responded to an e-petition for support on East West Rail by reiterating that they would encourage private funding.

In the 2011 Autumn Statement by Chancellor George Osborne, the East West railway between Oxford, Aylesbury Vale Parkway and Bedford was adopted by the Department for Transport, and £270 million was committed to the scheme to fund its development. This was confirmed in July 2012 when the Secretary of State for Transport, Justine Greening, announced that the Western section of East West Rail (EWR) would be part of the government's strategy for rail transport.

== Western section ==
East West Rail Western Section
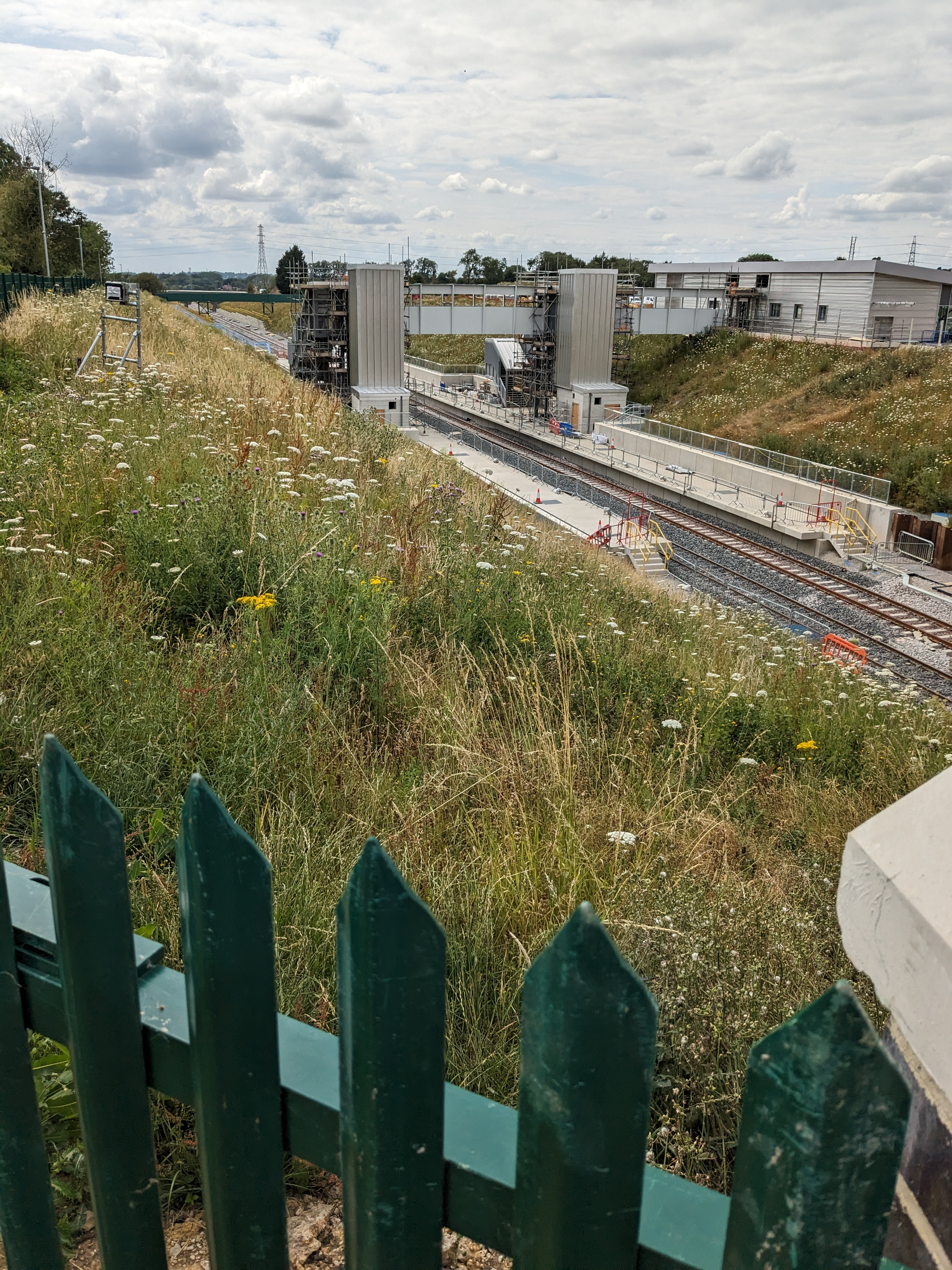
- Winslow Station under construction in 2023

Overview
- Status: Ready for use
- Owner: Network Rail
- Locale: Oxfordshire; Buckinghamshire
- Termini: Oxford; Bletchley/Milton Keynes Central
- Stations: 4 (existing); 2 (awaiting handover)

Service
- Type: Heavy rail, Main line railway
- System: National Rail
- Operator: Chiltern Railways

History
- Planned opening: 2025

Technical
- Track gauge: 4 ft 8 1/2 in (1,435 mm) standard gauge
- Operating speed: 100 mph (160 km/h) maximum (Oxford-Bletchley)

The western section links Oxford and Bedford via Bletchley, with connections to the West Coast Main Line and the Midland Main Line. This section is to reuse the trackbed of the Varsity Line (closed 1967), re-engineered for 100 mph (160 km/h) running. The first phase, Oxford–Bicester was reopened (as the Oxford–Bicester line) in 2016; engineering of the Bicester–Bletchley phase was completed in late 2024 and is due to reopen in the second half of 2025; work to rebuild the Bletchley–Bedford phase ("the Marston Vale line") is planned for the 2025–2030 period. From Oxford, the existing Cherwell Valley line provides a link to the Great Western Main Line (at Didcot Parkway). Passenger services to Milton Keynes Central (via the WCML) and Aylesbury (via the existing freight line from Claydon Junction) were also planned.

The first part of this work, doubling the Oxford–Bicester line and connecting it to the Chiltern Main Line, was largely completed in 2015 (and fully operational from December 2016); the remaining work from Bicester to Bedford was greatly delayed, but was scheduled for completion by 2030.

On 3 February 2020, the DfT made the Transport and Works Act Order for the Bicester–Bletchley and Aylesbury–Claydon sections. The Planning Inspectorate's report had indicated that the scheme was fully funded, as confirmed by a DfT letter dated 9 February 2018, with a budget for this phase of £1,084,726,000, consisting of £150.095 million in Control Period 5 (2014–2019) (sic) and £934.631 million in Control Period 6 (2019–2024) but that, if the Order was not made in 2019, delays of 6 to 12 months could be expected with an impact on its integration with HS2 and a resulting significant increase in costs which had not been allowed for in that funding.

=== Planning ===
In February 2008, the consortium published a business case for re-opening the western section of the route funded by Milton Keynes Partnership (MKP), South East England Regional Assembly, South East England Development Agency and the consortium.

In March 2008, a £2 million engineering survey of the existing and removed tracks was launched, and those undertaking the engineering survey stated that a 100 mph (160 km/h) link between Oxford and Bletchley could be achieved for around £190 million. If construction had started in 2009 as they then hoped, the upgraded / re-opened line could have been in service by 2012.

In November 2008, the Milton Keynes Partnership, Chiltern Railways and the consortium formally agreed to take their proposals forward together. Chiltern Railways would take the lead on the upgrading of the Oxford-Bicester section with its Project Evergreen 3 and the Milton Keynes Partnership would lead for the rest of the line to Bletchley.

In December 2008, the commissioning of a further report, to take the project forward to GRIP Stage 4 (single option selection), was announced. This was to encompass work to analyse the additional requirements (as outlined above), not previously considered in detail, to GRIP Stage 3 equivalent, as well as revisiting the future requirements for the existing Bletchley-Bedford line.

According to section 3 of the October 2008 progress report, during 2008 a number of proposals from other parties emerged which might have a significant impact on the project:

- an aspiration to use the route as part of a strategic freight route
- an aspiration to provide longer-distance north-south passenger services avoiding Birmingham, which could use the western section as part of its route
- a proposal by Chiltern Railways to run Oxford-Bicester-London passenger services via a [then] mooted new south-to-east chord to the existing Chiltern line. (This chord has been built and is now in use).

Section 3 also states that there is some uncertainty over various parties' requirements for the existing Bletchley-Bedford railway.

Infrastructural assessment investigations would be taken forward in parallel with this work funded by £2 million of contribution, half directly by the Department for Communities and Local Government and the other half in varying proportions from various local authorities' Growth Area Funding allocation. Work to clear vegetation from the redundant section of line for the infrastructure assessment started in January 2009.

In January 2021, East West Railway Company revised the phasing of the project, with delivery to be in three ‘connection stages’: Oxford – Milton Keynes; Oxford – Bedford; Oxford – Cambridge, and plans for the Aylesbury branch to be reviewed. In May 2023, the EWR Company announced that the Aylesbury branch was not being funded.

=== Design ===
The February 2008 report identified two options defined from different perspectives, the "Regional Rail" option (the best commercial case) and the "Local Rail" option (as identified by the requirements mainly of local authorities and business interests). As part of existing upgrades, a new bay platform has been provided at Milton Keynes Central, which will be able to receive the local services. The infrastructure between Oxford and Bletchley required by both options is essentially the same. The spur from Calvert to Aylesbury is only included in the Local option, though about 20% of southern part of the route has already been reinstated under the Aylesbury Vale Parkway project. The line from north of Wolvercote Tunnel (just north of Oxford) through Bicester to Bletchley would be enabled for 100 mph (160 km/h) double-track running. The Oxford–Wolvercote Tunnel section, and the Aylesbury–Calvert line if also provided, would be 90 mph (140 km/h) single-track working. A new high-level platform would be provided at Bletchley, with new stations (under the Local option only) at Winslow and Newton Longville. (Note: The new stations at Bletchley and Winslow are funded and scheduled but not that at Newton Longville.)

The Planning Inspectorate's report to the Minister for Transport, in support of the (presumed) final Transport and Works Act Order (January 2020), firmed up on these principles. The platforms at Aylesbury Vale Parkway, Bletchley High Level and Winslow were to be specified as suitable for trains no longer than four cars. The section between Oxford and Bletchley is specified as double-track, 100 mph (160 km/h) max.; Aylesbury–Claydon LNE Junction was to be single-track (with space but no underpinnings for a second track), up to 90 mph (140 km/h) but Bletchley–Bedford was to remain at 60 mph (97 km/h) maximum. The line was not initially to be electrified but constructed so as to facilitate electrification at a later date. The proposed Newton Longville station does not appear. There are no funded plans for north-to-east chords at Bicester (to enable a direct Banbury–Bletchley service) or at Bletchley (to enable a direct Milton Keynes Central–Bedford service).

In April 2026, EWRCo released its final consultation document before the Development Consent Order expected in 2027. Among its many changes, it specifies that the trains should be up to five carriages long, to accommodate the anticipated volume of customers for the Universal UK theme park beside a new Stewartby railway station.

=== Service pattern ===
As of August 2024, the service patterns for the Oxford–Bedford and Oxford–Milton Keynes Central semi-fast services has yet to be published. Pending any announcement to the contrary, it is assumed that the Oxford–Bicester and Bletchley–Bedford 'all stations' services will continue until further notice.

=== Approval ===
In the 2011 Autumn Statement by Chancellor George Osborne, the East West railway between Oxford, Aylesbury Vale Parkway and Bedford was approved and funded, with £270 million committed to the scheme. A new station was to open at Winslow and a high-level station built at Bletchley. The Bicester Village to Bletchley and the Aylesbury to Claydon Junction sections were to be upgraded or built to a 90–100 mph (140–160 km/h) line speed. At that stage it was due for completion in 2019.

On 16 July 2012, the East-West Rail Consortium made the following announcement:

"The Secretary of State for Transport, the Rt. Hon Justine Greening MP, today announced that the Western section of East West Rail (EWR) will be part of the government's strategy for rail transport, confirming not only funding for the project but also for electrification of the Oxford to Bedford part of the route. EWR will provide an electric link between the electrified Great Western, West Coast and Midland main lines. This further investment in the project upgrades it to form a key part of the new ‘Electric Spine’ passenger and freight route between the South Coast, the East Midlands and Yorkshire".

=== Developments and announcements for western section ===
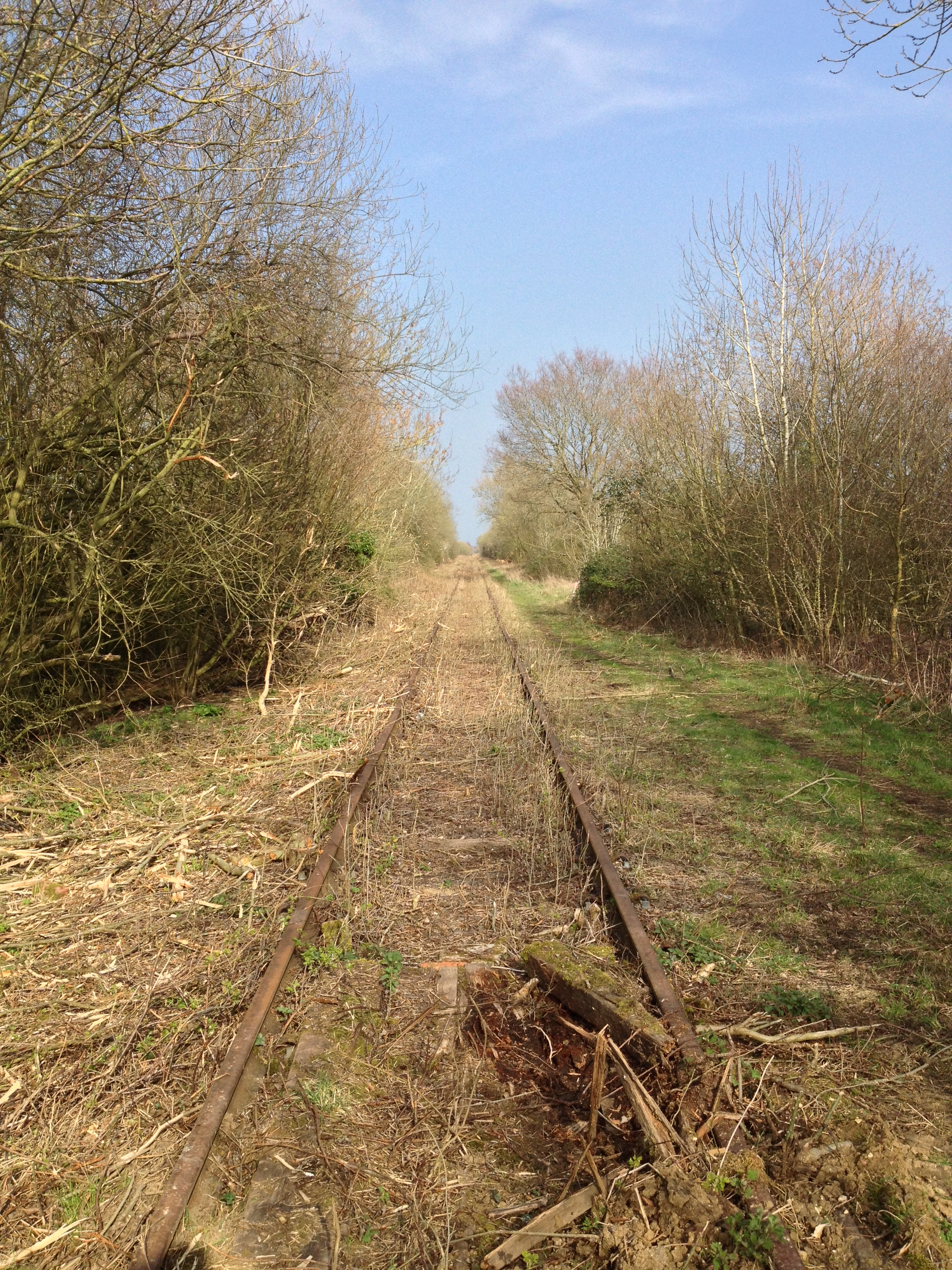
Vegetation clearance works, 3 mi (5 km) west of Bletchley, March 2014.

On 10 January 2013, Network Rail announced its intention to construct the western section between Bedford and Oxford, Aylesbury and Milton Keynes, as part of their five-year strategic business plan (2014–2019). The target date for train services to be operational on this section was December 2017. Electrification of the line between Oxford and Bedford was also included in the budget and target completion date was March 2017.

In November 2013, the East West Rail Consortium pledged an additional £45 million to the project. The chair of the East West Rail joint delivery board, Councillor Janet Blake presented a letter to Transport Minister Philip Hammond, confirming the financial commitment from the Board.

From 1 February 2014, Network Rail began clearing vegetation that had grown over the abandoned track.

In March 2014, Carillion and Buckingham Group announced that they were to undertake construction of the new link, commencing with the Oxford to Bicester stretch, with a contract value of £87 million, but later that month Network Rail stated that there would be a delay in the completion of the line by two years until 2019.

Early in April 2014, Network Rail acknowledged that the busy level crossing in Milton Keynes between Woburn Sands and Wavendon is presenting "a headache". The report goes on to say that the crossing near Bow Brickhill (Brickhill Street in Milton Keynes to the A5) will be replaced with a bridge.

In May 2014, Network Rail announced that the line will be opened to 125 mph (200 km/h) running, the current top speed for InterCity services. It is proposed that CrossCountry services, along with Chiltern Railways and London Northwestern Railway services will use the route.

In July 2015, Sir Peter Hendy was appointed chairman of Network Rail "and asked by the Secretary of State to conduct a thorough review of the enhancement programme in England and Wales to see what can be delivered in an affordable and timely way within the funding period to 2019". The report states "During CP5 development work will continue into the full re-opening of the route between Bicester and Bletchley [...] and delivery will be started as soon as possible". However, in the table that lists in detail the revised work programme, the route is shown as one of the "Projects with significant delivery in CP5 and completion in CP6". (CP5 is 2014–2019; CP6 is 2019–2024.)

As part of the Budget of March 2016, the Chancellor, George Osborne, wrote to the National Infrastructure Commission (NIC) to ask them to develop proposals for unlocking growth, housing and jobs in the Cambridge – Milton Keynes – Oxford corridor. The letter made reference to the East West Rail Link, raising the possibility of further development of the line in the future.

In May 2016, the Department for Transport revealed that it was 'considering a new franchise to operate services on the east-west rail link' and that 'development of the proposed franchise will start in 2018 (including a competition period)'.

By August 2016, it became clear that Network Rail considers the project to be 'no longer the third most important project in the country' (after HS2 and Crossrail) and that delivery of the core of the Western Section (Oxford to Bedford via Bletchley) might slip beyond 2024, with the connection to Aylesbury due even later. Councillor Rodney Rose, chair of the East West Rail Consortium suggested that the main causes of the delay include delays arising from rail electrification difficulties and fiscal uncertainty arising from the UK's decision to leave the European Union. In October 2016, the Minister instructed Network Rail to delete electrification from the design, but to maintain clearances to permit a retrofit at an unspecified future date.

In November 2016, Chancellor of the Exchequer Philip Hammond announced £110 million funding to ensure completion of the Bicester–Bedford segment by 2025.

In December 2016, the Transport Secretary announced his decision to privatise the line. A new entity will be responsible for track and infrastructure, as well as operating train services, which, he believes, will deliver an Oxford–Cambridge service at an earlier date than is realistic for an overcommitted Network Rail.

In July 2017, Network Rail began a public consultation on the details of its proposals for the Bicester–Bedford section.

In August 2017, the East West Rail Alliance, the consortium – VolkerRail, Atkins, Laing O'Rourke and Network Rail – developing the Western section, noted that the decision by the Department for Transport to delete electrification from the specification was causing further delay to the programme, because work already done on the TWA applications would need to be reworked.

In November 2017, in its report on the Cambridge – Milton Keynes – Oxford corridor, the NIC called for the line between Bicester and Bedford to be reopened by 2023 and Bedford/Cambridge by 2030, and for the development and construction of a link between the M1 motorway and Oxford by 2030, as part of the proposed Oxford–Cambridge Expressway. In his budget of November 2017 the Chancellor, Philip Hammond, allocated further funding to open the western section by 2024 via a new company, the East West Railway Company, which was established in December 2017.

In December 2017, the Transport Secretary announced the establishment of a new East West Railway Company which will oversee the establishment of both the Western & Central Sections of East West Rail Link. The budget in November 2017 announced the completion of the central section by 2030 and a preferred route to be announced in early 2019 following a number of public consultations.

In April 2018, the chairman of the East West Railway Company, Rob Brighouse, suggested a new line between Milton Keynes and Bedford might avoid the problems with the current Marston Vale Line. These problems are the all-stations hourly stopping service operated by London Northwestern Railway and numerous level crossing on the route: these could limit capacity for through regional trains. He acknowledged that this proposal could be expensive but suggested the private sector could help fund it. He also suggested then that the Western Section could be completed by 2022, ahead of the planned 2024 opening date.

On 27 July 2018, Network Rail submitted a Transport and Works Act Order (TWAO) application to the Secretary of State for Transport for the Bicester-Bletchley segment. The Public Enquiry ended on 1 May 2019.

A DfT/EWR report that considers the strategic and economic cases for the Western Section Phase 2 project was published on 7 December 2018.

In July 2019, the EWR Company announced that it will be issuing Invitations to Tender for rolling stock 'later this year', possibly as early as August.

In January 2020, the chairman of the consortium said that, following the public inquiry into the western section that had been held in 2019, he hoped there would be a positive announcement on the TWAO in the 'very near future', with major construction work starting later in 2020. In February 2020, Transport Minister Grant Shapps approved the TWAO.

In March 2020, the company invited tenders for supply of twelve to fourteen three-car (self-powered, driver-controlled) trains on a four-year lease.

In April 2020, the EWR Alliance published its schedule of works, which projects that the infrastructure will be fully tested and ready to use "in 2024".

In April 2022, Network Rail released the project's strategic assessment highlighting the potential for westernmost services to Bristol and Southampton, and to Cardiff in Wales. Following on from the latter, in June 2025, the project was designated as an "England and Wales" project, limiting additional funding to Wales, attracting criticism from Welsh politicians.

In April 2023, the Department for Transport announced its intent to negotiate an amendment to its current agreement with Chiltern Railways, to add operation of the Oxford – Milton Keynes Central service, with effect from December 2024.

==== March 2021 consultation ====
In March 2021, the company opened "non-statutory" consultation on its plans for the Western (and Central) segments. A more detailed technical report supports the consultation document. In an associated document, it announced that its opening plans for East West Rail have changed, notably deferring indefinitely a connection to Aylesbury.

The new plans divide the schedule into Connect Stages. "Connect Stage 1" should open in 2025 and see two trains per hour from Oxford to Milton Keynes Central. "Connect Stage 2" is planned to run between Oxford and Bedford (Mainline) after upgrading the Marston Vale line. Although work had been planned as part of the Western Section this could not provide the two trains per hour to Bedford nor accommodate an extension to Cambridge.

"Connect Stage 1" proposes changes to Oxford, Oxford Parkway and Bicester Village railway stations. For Oxford, proposals are for two additional platforms (platform 5 and Platform 0), two new sidings south of Platform 1 and 2, additional crossovers and two additional tracks to accommodate the 6 trains per hour planned for EWR. Oxford Parkway and Bicester Village could get expansions to the car parks at both stations. The report moots the closure of the London Road level crossing in Bicester, with several options put forward for replacements.

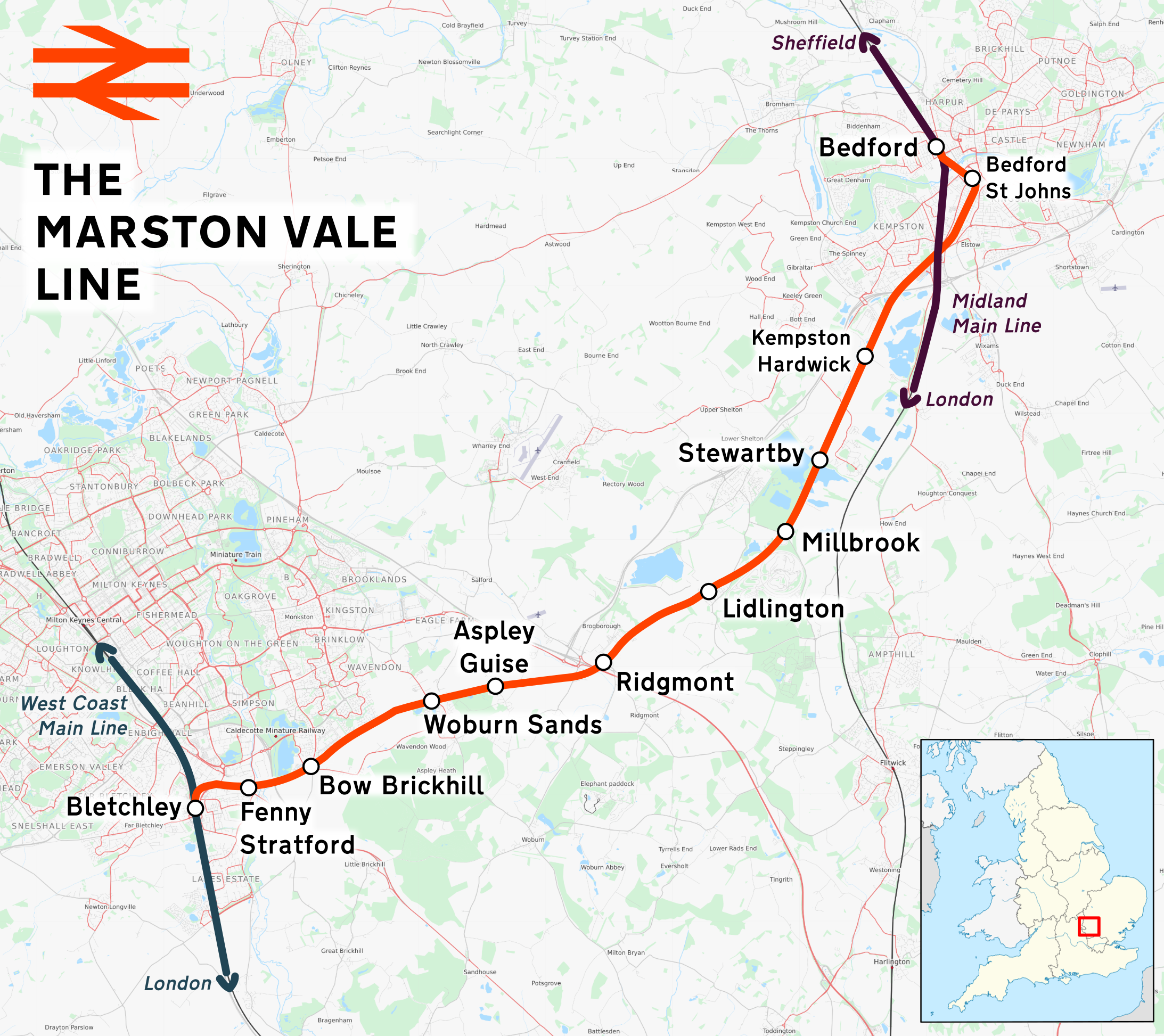
The existing Marston Vale line stations which may be relocated or consolidated.

"Connect Stage 2" might involve:

- a new platform at Bletchley opposite platform 6 (in addition to the high-level platforms already scheduled)
- reinstatement of the second track at Fenny Stratford
- possible closure of the original Bow Brickhill and Woburn Sands stations and their merger onto a new site just west of Woburn Sands, in a possible Milton Keynes south-east expansion area.
- relocation of Ridgmont station to accommodate passing loops and a merger with a potentially closed Aspley Guise
- relocation of Bedford St Johns either close to the hospital or south west of the existing site, both of which options are to enable realignment of the existing track,
- remodelling Bedford (mainline) railway station (discussed below).
- closure of level crossings across the route

Other proposals put forward for Connect Stage 2 regarding services and stations are to retain the existing 'all stations' hourly service between Bletchley and Bedford and to provide two trains per hour between Cambridge and Bletchley as well as two trains per hour between Oxford and Cambridge both stopping at Woburn Sands and Ridgmont. Another option is to replace the stations with five newly relocated stations (at Woburn Sands, Ridgmont, Stewartby, Lidlington and Bedford St Johns.

In May 2023, the EWR Company announced that the Aylesbury branch was not being funded.

(The consultation also describes the route options between Bedford and Cambridge, as discussed below.)

==== 2026 consultation ====
The 2026 consultation said that Bedford station would be upgraded by the mid-2030s which would enable four trains per hour to run into Bedford from the west (i.e. from the direction of Oxford).

=== Engineering and construction works ===
From April 2020, work began to refurbish the Bletchley Flyover, with sections beside and over the WCML being removed in April and May. The arches crossing Buckingham Road (on the east side of WCML) started being removed on 5 July 2020. During summer 2021, a new structure, in the form of a box tunnel around the WCML, was completed. By early February 2022, 1.5 km (0.93 mi) of track had been installed over the new flyover, enabling engineering trains to reach the eastern end of the construction site.

At Bicester, the first section of new track for the EWR2 project was successfully installed in April 2021. "This is a key milestone for the project because it is not only the first section of track, but it will also enable access for the engineering trains that will carry out the track construction across the whole project". At Bletchley in late 2021, track was installed over the new flyover, enabling engineering trains to reach the eastern end of the construction site.

In December 2023, East-West Rail Partnership announced that the track laying between Bicester Village and Bletchley was 99% complete, including bridges, earthworks and an underpass at Calvert. The track was completed ceremonially on 7 March 2024.

In January 2026, the EWR company announced its intent to establish a Bletchley West TMD (train maintenance depot) near Newton Longville.

=== Testing ===
Test trains started travelling the full journey between Oxford and Milton Keynes on 21 October 2024. These have been run by Chiltern Railways using Class 168 trains. GWR also tested a Class 800 train on the line. The reported reason was to test the viability of diverting Great Western line trains to Euston in the case of future engineering works at Old Oak Common.

=== Delivery ===
==== Phase 1: Oxford–Bicester ====
The section from Oxford through Bicester Village to the Chiltern Main Line was rebuilt as part of Phase 2 of Chiltern Railways Project Evergreen and adopted as Phase 1 of the East West Rail Link. Chiltern Railways began service over it, from Oxford Parkway to Marylebone, on 26 October 2015; and from Oxford station to Marylebone on 11 December 2016.

==== Phase 2: Bicester–Bletchley ====
The line was ready for use by the end of 2024; the first use of the line for passenger services was between 21 and 28 December 2024, when Great Western used the line to get to London (at Euston) because the line to Paddington was out of service. In early February 2025, Network Rail announced that the entire Oxford–Bletchley route has been released to freight operators (although testing continues prior to commencement of passenger services). In the same announcement, Network Rail said the line uses a new signalling technology, the AtkinsRéalis "Modular Control System Infinity (MCS-I)" system, that is being used for the first time in Britain. The Bletchley high-level platforms and waiting areas were ready for use by the end of 2024.

In March 2025, Chiltern Railways announced that it had been appointed to operate passenger services on East West Rail between Oxford and Milton Keynes Central (via Oxford Parkway, Bicester Village, Winslow (newly constructed) and Bletchley stations). Chiltern (then) expected the service to become operational in late 2025. In November 2025 at an industry conference, Chiltern's Managing Director reported that the company had declared the working environment at Winslow station unacceptable and that remedial work is required before the company can accept it. A Network Rail spokesperson said that this work is expected to be completed by the end of the year. The stations at Bedford, Bletchley and Bicester are to undergo renovation to improve accessibility for disabled passengers.

By June 2025, Northampton-bound freight trains were using the line from Oxford via Milton Keynes.

== Central section ==
The Varsity Line route trackbed alignment between Bedford and Cambridge is no longer available for East West Rail because key sections of it have been reused for other purposes since the closure of this part of the line in 1968. These include the Ryle Telescope (part of the Mullard Radio Astronomy Observatory), Trumpington Meadows, the Cambridgeshire Guided Busway and National Cycle Route 51 as well as housing at Potton, Sandy, and Trumpington. Consequently, an entirely new route has had to be identified.

=== Developments and announcements for central section ===
In March 2016, Network Rail announced that the link would connect to the East Coast Main Line (ECML) via (or near) Sandy. In the 2016 Autumn Statement, the chancellor announced £10 million of funding to continue to develop plans for the route.

On 30 October 2018, the Chancellor of the Exchequer announced in his Autumn Budget that £20 million was being made available for work to develop a "strategic outline business case" for the Bedford–Cambridge segment.

In December 2018, in a paper published jointly with the Department for Transport and EWR Company reported that it intended to begin consultations on the route of the central section "early in 2019".

On 28 January 2019, East West Railway Company revealed five potential routes in the consultation which ran from 28 January until 11 March 2019.

- Route A involves going from the Marston Vale line to a new Bedford South split-level station with the Midland Main Line then to a relocated Sandy station, south of the existing station. The route then heads east to a new station at Bassingbourn before then joining the Great Northern route to Cambridge.
- Route B involves running from the Marston Vale line to a new Bedford South station before then running to a relocated Sandy (to the north Tempsford area or south of St. Neots). The route heads east to a new station in Cambourne before swinging south to join the existing line northbound to Cambridge.
- Route C involves running from the Marston Vale line to a new Bedford South station before continuing to a new junction station at Tempsford with the ECML and then continuing on the ECML to Sandy. The route then leaves the ECML and heads east to a new station at Bassingbourn before joining the existing line northbound to Cambridge.
- Route D involves running from the existing Bedford (Midland road) station heading north then turning east towards a new Tempsford station before joining the ECML and heading to Sandy. The route then heads east towards a new station at Bassingbourn then joining the existing line northbound to Cambridge.
- Route E involves running from the existing Bedford station heading north then running to Tempsford where a new station would be built then (bypassing Sandy) the route heads east to Cambourne where a new station would be built. The route then joins an existing line northbound to Cambridge

None of the route options connect to Cambridge via Cambridge North as this option was ruled out in the evaluation stage. However, its section 7.7 concedes that two of its routes could alternatively approach Cambridge from the north if new information is provided to EWR Co through the consultation that suggests that this would be better.

The consultation document proposes a target date of "mid 2020s" for the central section to be completed.

In September 2019, the government declared the Central Section a nationally significant infrastructure project.

In September 2022, the government confirmed East West Rail and Cambridge South as two of the "138 major infrastructure projects that the Government aims to fast-track," although "inclusion in the list [does] not guarantee funding, planning consent or approval at this stage".

In January 2025, Chancellor Rachel Reeves confirmed funding for the Bedford–Cambridge section, including specifically a new railway station at Tempsford that is also to serve the East Coast Main Line.

==== Route selected ====
In January 2020, the company announced that Route E (Bedford Midland – "south of St Neots / Tempsford area" – Cambourne – Cambridge) had been selected as the preferred route.

Go-ahead for Cambridge South railway station was announced in the budget of 11 March 2020. On 22 June 2020, Network Rail revealed that its preferred location for the station was at a site adjacent to Addenbrooke's Hospital and the Cambridgeshire Guided Busway crossing. The indicative route E corridor for the East West line shows a junction with the West Anglia Main Line (WAML) south of Cambridge but is (deliberately) vague about the precise location of this junction and thus its position relative to that of Cambridge South; local media reports anticipate that it will be such as to enable East West trains to stop here.

In late December 2020, EWR Company announced that it would begin an informal consultation on the route details in "early 2021".

==== Route option lobbying ====
The northern route was promoted by a private interest group "CamBedRailRoad", which sought to connect EWR via a new line to Cambridge North. East West Rail Ltd rejected this option in favour of a broad 'route corridor' ("Option E") running south of Cambridge, probably but as of October 2020 not definitely, via a new Cambridge South station on the Cambridge line and the WAML.

A group called "Cambridgeapproaches" was formed in June 2020 from a collection of parishes in the Option E area to review route alignments in the area and to consult residents on alternatives.

==== 2021 Bedford–Cambridge route alignment consultation ====
In March 2021, East West Railway Company opened an "informal consultation" on proposals for the Central section’s route alignment. The proposals put forward include:

- in Bedford:
  - relocation of Bedford St Johns;
  - either expansion of the mainline station with three new platforms or complete relocation of the station;
  - possibly widening the Midland Main Line corridor north of the station to give EWR its own dedicated tracks;
- narrowing the (EWR) route corridor options near Tempsford and Cambourne:
  - there are two potential sites for the ECML crossing: one just north of the historic station and the second a mile or so closer to St Neots, which it calls "St Neots South". Table 9.2 strongly prefers the latter option. Whether there will be a junction station is left for others to decide;
  - two potential sites are proposed for Cambourne station: one across the A428 from the town and the second on the south side. The report favours the former.
- on the approach to Cambridge:
  - the option to join the WAML directly is dismissed as infeasible for a variety of reasons;
  - instead, the EWR will merge first with the Cambridge Line (also known as the Shepreth Branch Line) via a grade-separated junction (Hauxton Junction) between Harston and Newton and then onward to the WAML;
  - increasing the number of tracks on the WAML from Shepreth Junction to Cambridge (central) station from two to four, with associated changes to that junction;
  - two further platforms to be added at Cambridge, using space currently allocated to sidings.

==== 2021 Bletchley–Bedford stations review ====
In the same consultation, the company put forward proposals for the stations between Bletchley and Bedford (currently known as the Marston Vale Line). The proposals put forward include:

- Woburn Sands could be relocated to the western outskirts of the town, between the existing Woburn Sands and Bow Brickhill stations, which would close;
- Ridgmont could be relocated to the west;
- Lidlington could be relocated between the existing Lidlington and Millbrook stations which would close;
- Stewartby could be relocated between the existing Stewartby and Kempston Hardwick stations which would close

As of May 2023, the results remain almost evenly divided with further work to be explored.

==== 2023 Bedford–Cambridge preferred route ====
In May 2023, following public consultation, EWRL published its preferred route for a new line between Bedford and Cambridge. The preferred route, which will be subject to statutory consultation in the second half of 2025, includes a new interchange station (with the ECML) at Tempsford, a new station at Cambourne, then to Cambridge via Cambridge South station. The draft (non-statutory) plan proposed compulsory acquisition and demolition of 65 houses in Bedford so that an additional two tracks can be laid north of Bedford station.

In the preferred option, the majority of the section via Tempsford will broadly follow the route of the planned A1–M11/A14 link. The report also presumes significant future urban development of the Tempsford area, particularly the disused RAF Tempsford site. Although the route into Cambridge via Cambridge South would be more expensive than the alternative northern approach, EWRL believes that it would bring greater economic benefits to the region. Endorsing the proposed route, the (former) Secretary of State for Transport (Mark Harper) confirmed the Government's continued support for the project. In January 2025, Chancellor Rachel Reeves confirmed funding for the Bedford–Cambridge section, including specifically a new railway station at Tempsford that is also to serve the East Coast Main Line.

In October 2023, Network Rail awarded a contract for construction of Cambridge South station.

=== NAO investigation ===
In October 2023, the National Audit Office (NAO) announced that it intended to assess the "economic and strategic" case for the project. In December 2023, the NAO released its report which, among other remarks, observed that:

"East West Rail represents a £6-7 billion investment to support growth in a part of the UK that the government regards as economically important, but it is not yet clear how the benefits of the project will be achieved nor how it aligns to other government plans for growth in the region. As with many transport projects, the rationale for East West Rail does not rest on the strength of the benefit–cost ratio for the project alone – which is poor – but on its wider strategic aim of overcoming constraints to economic growth in the Oxford–Cambridge region".

=== 2025 progress ===
In 2025, the Labour government committed to invest an additional £2.5 billion into East West Rail. Cambridge South station opened on 28 June 2026.

Ground investigations by Concept civil engineering along the Bedford to Cambridge route began in February 2025 and were expected to be completed by July.

== Eastern section ==
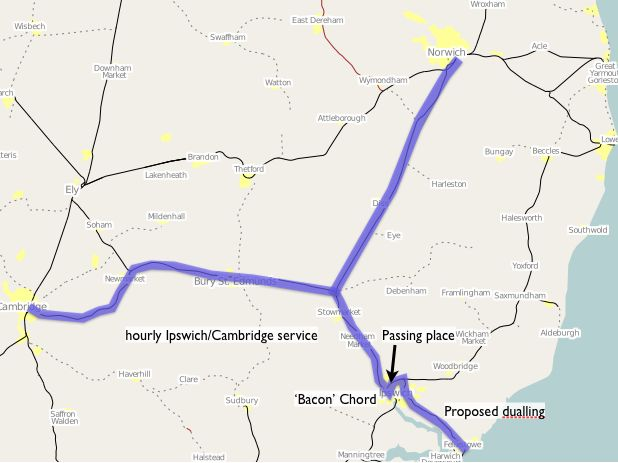
Eastern section of link including Norwich, Felixstowe, Ipswich and Cambridge

The track in this section is all in place and operational: from Cambridge to Norwich, Felixstowe and Ipswich. The plan would see more services on the existing Felixstowe Branch Line, Ipswich to Ely Line, and parts of the East Suffolk Line and Great Eastern Main Line. Hourly services in both directions between Cambridge and Ipswich were started in 2004. There are also hourly passenger services between Cambridge and Norwich operated by Greater Anglia, although these run on the Breckland line (via Ely and Thetford) instead of the Great Eastern Main Line.

A section of Felixstowe Branch Line was doubled in 2009 to allow freight trains to pass each other at Derby Road in Ipswich and there were plans to double 5 miles (8.0 km) of route from Nacton to Trimley together with other work as part of the Felixstowe and Nuneaton freight capacity scheme. The "Bacon Factory Curve" in Ipswich was completed in March 2014 to allow trains from Felixstowe to continue to the West Midlands without reversing at Ipswich.

In January 2019, East West Rail Consortium released a document to press the case for the Eastern section to Norwich via Ely, and to Ipswich via Bury St Edmunds.

In November 2025, East West Rail proposed that a new Cambridge East station be established near the former Cambridge Airport, to serve the possible major redevelopment of the site.

== Status ==
Status by section
Section	Current status	Active now?	Notes
Oxford–Bicester	Completed and in passenger use	Yes	The Oxford–Bicester upgrade was completed in 2016, with services already running on this section.
Bicester–Bletchley	Infrastructure completed, passenger services not yet started	Freight only	Infrastructure was completed in 2024 and handed over, but passenger services have not begun.
Bletchley–Bedford	Existing	Yes	Forms part of the Marston Vale Line upgrade
Bedford–Cambridge	In planning / consultation stage	No	East West Rail announced a final route-wide consultation running 14 April to 9 June 2026, ahead of a DCO submission planned for 2027.

== See also ==
- Oxford-Cambridge Arc
- Felixstowe to Nuneaton railway upgrade
- Northern Powerhouse Rail, proposed upgrades to the Liverpool–Hull cross-Pennines route, especially the Liverpool–Manchester–Leeds section.

== Bibliography ==
- Hendy, Peter (25 November 2015). Report from Sir Peter Hendy to the Secretary of State for Transport on the replanning of Network Rail's Investment Programme (PDF) (Report). Network Rail. Archived from the original (PDF) on 21 January 2016.
- Whitehead, Martin (1 October 2019). Network Rail (East West Rail Bicester to Bedford improvements) order 201[ ]; application for deemed planning permission; applications for listed building consent (PDF) (Report). Department for Transport (published 3 February 2020). (Inspector's report)
- Making Meaningful Connections: Consultation Document (PDF) (Report). East West Rail Company. 31 March 2021.
- Making Meaningful Connections: Consultation Technical Report (PDF) (Report). East West Rail Company. March 2021.
