= Aspley Guise =

Village in Bedfordshire, England

Coordinates: 52.0126°N 0.6285°W

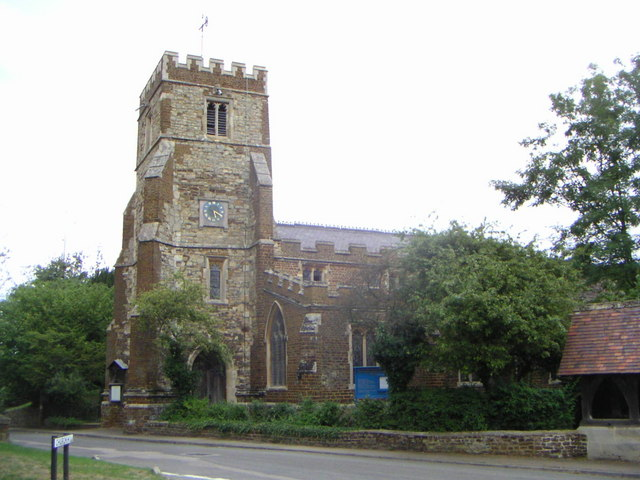
- St Botolph's Church

- Location within Bedfordshire
- Interactive map of Aspley Guise
- Population: 2,195 (2011 census)
- OS grid reference: SP942359
  - London: 48 miles (77 km)
- Unitary authority: Central Bedfordshire
- Ceremonial county: Bedfordshire
- Region: East
- Country: England
- Sovereign state: United Kingdom
- Post town: MILTON KEYNES
- Postcode district: MK17
- Police: Bedfordshire
- Fire: Bedfordshire
- Ambulance: East of England

Aspley Guise is a village and civil parish in the west of Central Bedfordshire, England. In addition to the village of Aspley Guise itself, the civil parish also includes part of the town of Woburn Sands, the rest of which is in the City of Milton Keynes in Buckinghamshire. Together with Woburn Sands and Aspley Heath, it forms part of the Milton Keynes urban area. It is centred 6 miles (9.7 km) east southeast of Central Milton Keynes and 1 mile (1.6 km) south of the M1 junction 13. It has its own railway station on the Marston Vale Line, and an historic centre with 29 listed buildings.

== History ==
=== Toponymy ===
Asperele and Aspel are recorded in Letter Patents, Assize Rolls and such documents of the 13th century, with the names Aspelegise appearing in the following century.

The name derives from "Aspenlea" meaning the aspen clearing – and from the late medieval period, "of the Guise family" when Anselm de Gyse became Lord of the Manor in 1375.

== Early history ==
The first record of Aspley dates from 969, when land there comprising 15 hides was granted by King Edgar (the Peaceable) to his thegn (thane) Alfwold.

By the date of the Domesday Book, 1086, the parish had 25 households, five of which were recorded as serfs. The book notes it covered a large tract of agricultural land, valued at £10 to its overlords, though rendering only £8, and was held before the conquest by Leofeva of Earl Waltheof. Its contemporary manor owner was Acard of Ivry who held of Hugh de Beauchamp, its feudal overlord.

In total were 12 ploughlands (larger than average), 10 ploughs of meadow, woodland producing 50 hogs per year, one mill; the book records no church at that date.

Its church is mentioned in the records of the diocese in 1223.

During the Second World War, the community housed several secret facilities relating in some manner to code-breaking and propaganda.

=== Aspley Manor ===
Most of the cultivated land was held by the manor in the medieval period. Historical records go back to 969, when King Edgar the Peaceful granted the land to a thegn, Alfwold. In 1086, at the time of the Domesday Book, the manor was held by Hugh de Beauchamp (sheriff).

The stayed in Acard's family until his descendant, Reginald de Ivri granted a lease to Falkes de Breauté. On confiscation of Falkes's estates in 1225, King Henry III granted the rest of the lease to Henry de Capella. However, by 1227, a certain "Reginald de St. Valery" was free to release the land (entire fee) to his regent (since Henry was 20 years old (Note: At the time, the age of majority was 21)) Hubert de Burgh, 1st Earl of Kent, with an official approval (confirmation of alienation).

In 1233 the King confiscated Hubert's lands but he was restored to all his wealth the following year in the Testa de Nevill. By 1267 it is established in the royal returns and copies (literally, rolls) of letters that he had subinfeudated the manor to Anselm de Gyse, in return for knight's service to John de Burgh and heirs. (Note: These heirs were in prominent families at the time: namely Robert de Gresley and son-in-law John de la Warr.)

After the middle of the 14th century the heirs of Hubert de Burgh in Aspley seem to have lapsed, and the manor was held directly of the barony of Bedford.

The tenancy was in this period that of de Guise. Anselm died in 1295 left as heir a son John, then aged 17 – his descendants inherited this tenancy and became direct tenants as mentioned. In 1428 the lord of the manor's lord briefly changed to Giles Bridges, who had married Catherine Gyse, widow, of the previous lord, Reginald Gyse, however this was brief.

In 1560, Queen Elizabeth I gave this asset by royal grant to Sir Richard Lee, military engineer. His daughter Ann, later Mrs Ralph Norwich, received permission to alienate (sell) the manor to Francis Bury, whose heir, Frances, by arrangement or fate married Ann's grandson, Thomas Lee Sadleir. (Note: d.1644)

The estate passed down in a straightforward line of Sadleirs to Richard Vernon Sadleir who died in 1810, whose sister Ursula Moody inherited it. The owner in 1912 was accordingly her descendant, a certain Mr F. Moody.

The current manor house was built about 1700.

=== Rectory ===
As to the church lands and tithes, in 1317 a further confirmation of Simon de Beauchamp's grant of the church and two parts of the tithes was made in favour of Newnham Priory. In 1544, these lands and the advowson were released by John Gyse and Anselm his son and heir to the Crown. In the similarly timed Dissolution of the Chantries (one year before its famed successor) an acre here was appropriated by the crown and its proceeds given to fund a new church window. What remained of the rectory was consolidated in 1796 with the vicarage of Husborne Crawley and re-established half a century later.

=== The church charities ===
Aspley Guise Inclosure Act 1759
- Act of Parliament
- Parliament of the United Kingdom
- Long title: An Act for enclosing and dividing the Common Fields, Common Meadows, Lammas Grounds, and other Common and Waste Lands, in the Manor and Parish of Aspley Guise, in the County of Bedford.
- Citation: 33 Geo. 2. c. 45 Pr.
- Territorial extent: Great Britain

Dates
- Royal assent: 22 May 1760
- Commencement: 13 November 1759 (Note: Start of session.)

Status: Current legislation

The Town Close, containing 4.75 acres (1.92 ha) and administered by the ecclesiastical parish, was awarded to the village by the Aspley Guise Inclosure Act 1759 (33 Geo. 2. c. 45 Pr.). By 1912, it still produced (as a benefit for the poor) agricultural produce worth £8 18s. a year, (Note: about £1,870 today) which was expended from time to time on its produce-growers' work.

== 20th century ==
In the early 20th century large brickworks, with clay extraction was the main industry in the parish itself, having ceased by that century the extraction of fuller's earth, on which profit was no longer possible. Agriculture, as today formed a minority of employment.

The Rookery, a secluded Victorian mansion in Church Street, was used by intelligence operatives during the Second World War for black propaganda against Germany controlled by Sefton Delmer.

== Landmarks ==
The Aspley Guise Conservation Area (designated in 1971 and amended in 2008) includes a number of buildings with historic importance; several are of high architectural importance.

The garden walls and gateway of Aspley House are listed in an entry separate from the house; in total, there are 32 structures in the community that have been identified by English Heritage as worthy of historic listing; all are Grade II listed buildings.

=== St Botolph's church ===
According to the diocese records, a church was built on this site circa 1223. Historic record specifically mention it and state that control of the parish was held by Newnham Priory. The land (manor) owner at the time was Sir Falkes de Breauté but the holding passed to Hubert de Burgh, 1st Earl of Kent, in 1227.

The current Anglican church is medieval and dedicated to St Botolph, also known as Botwulf of Thorney, an English abbot who died in 680 AD. One source states that parts of the building were constructed in the 15th century but it was significantly modified in the 19th century. The stained glass is mostly from the Victorian era. The building is "mainly coursed ironstone with ashlar dressings".

A history from 1912 states that the church had been so extensively modified that "its architectural history is in large measure uncertain". The tower shows three dates when work was completed: 1665, 1765 and 1855.

The church tower has six bells, made by John Taylor & Co (Taylor's of Loughborough) and installed in 1883. Its southern window of a nativity screen was installed during the last major series of renovations and is described by the church as "very fine".

The north aisle has a 15th-century traceried screen, a similarly dated circular font and a tomb chest with effigy of knight, probably Sir William Tyrington, estimated to date to c.1400. In this floor are typical brasses, one to John Danvers or Daweners, rector, c.1410, another c.1500, probably to Sir John de Gyse/Guise.

=== Aspley House ===
This was built in 1690 according to some sources, but the historic listing indicates 1695; it is in the style of Sir Christopher Wren and was modified circa 1750 and again later. In 1912 this house still contained many fine portraits of the Hervey and Chernock families.

=== Guise House ===
In the 18th century, Guise House and its grounds were home to (Aspley) Classical Academy until 1845, a school at its peak rated to rival Eton and Harrow. It has above its façade a Greek-style open pediment with windows in its tympanum (triangular area). It has a stone parapet tower.

=== The Old House ===
The Old House is timber-frame (of typical Tudor architectural construction) and dates from 1575, according to Historic England, with some Georgian alterations. The local Council believes it was built as early as 1545, and this may be the oldest building in the community.

=== Others ===
The village has 26 other examples of listed architecture, many of them early Georgian.

The village is served by Aspley Guise railway station, a small station on the Marston Vale Line running between Bedford and Bletchley.

== Topography ==
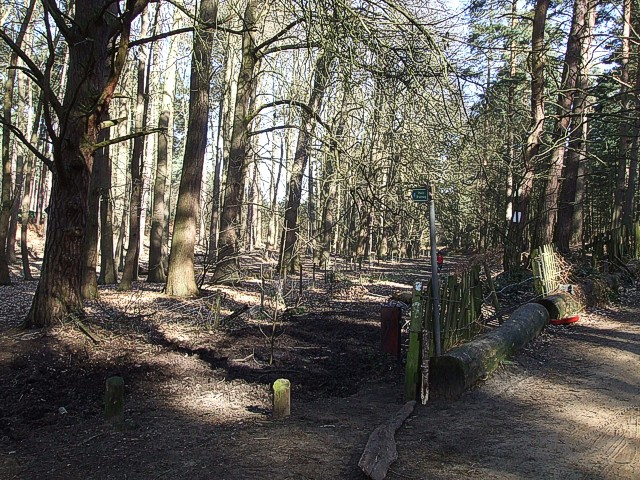
Aspley Woods at the southern corner of the civil parish

The southwestern area, which includes Aspley Wood has substantial pine trees, the west has a public golf course, accessed from either road to Woburn Sands. In the northern part crops are grown. Aspley Heath, once part of the parish, is now its own village and civil parish and is south of Aspley Wood, relatively distant to the south-west.

Elevations range from 75m AOD at the northern boundary marked by the middle of the M1 (with side-by-side, parallel, local road the A422), to the start of village centre which is at between 84m (at the station) and 124m at the Common Farm and Golf course in the southwest, just below which to two sides is most of the village. Streets are steepest between the station developed area and the historic upland area. A spring rises on this slope, east of Church Street, the single road scaling the slope.

== Localities ==
The parish is today relatively small compared to others and has kept to a main north–south development, with buffer zones and recreational areas to either side – see linear development.

=== Aspley Guise Triangle ===
The 'Aspley Guise triangle' is its northern area of farmland bounded by the A421 to the north and north-east and the Marston Vale line to the south (which separates it from the developed and recreational areas of Aspley Guise) and Cranfield Road to the west. It had been named with this term in the regional body's Expansion plans for Milton Keynes and identified as an appropriate possibility, being served by a railway station. In the ministerial ruling on the plan, this area was excluded on the technicality that it is not part of the South East of England Region, though with a hint that it might appear again in an East of England regional spatial strategy, which had its own fulfilled plans.

Following the 2010 United Kingdom general election, the coalition government cancelled its predecessor's regional housing targets and bodies. The Local Authority (Central Bedfordshire Council) has since put forward a Local Plan that identifies this area of land for development of 3,000 homes plus facilities.

== Transport ==
=== Road ===
Aspley Guise is bisected by Bedford Road, which heads eastwards towards Junction 13 of the M1, and westwards towards Newport Road, which heads southwards towards Woburn, and northwards towards Woburn Sands and the wider Milton Keynes urban area.

=== Rail ===
Aspley Guise railway station is on the Marston Vale line between Bedford and Bletchley and has trains hourly Monday-Saturday. It is three calling points east of Bletchley for interchange with local services on the West Coast Main Line.
