= Husborne Crawley railway station =

Disused railway station in Husborne Crawley, Bedfordshire

Husborne Crawley

General information
- Location: Husborne Crawley, Bedfordshire; England
- Coordinates: 52.0232°N 0.6052°W
- Grid reference: SP958370
- Platforms: 2

Other information
- Status: Disused

History
- Original company: London and North Western Railway
- Post-grouping: London Midland and Scottish Railway

Key dates
- 30 October 1905: Opened
- 1 January 1917: Closed as a wartime economy measure
- 5 May 1919: Reopened
- 5 May 1941: Closed permanently
Location

Husborne Crawley railway station served the village of Husborne Crawley, Bedfordshire, England from 1905 to 1941 on the Varsity line.

== History ==
The station opened on 30 October 1905 by the London and North Western Railway. The station was situated on the west side of Bedford Road. The Railway Magazine of December 1905 reports that the first service was planned to start on 1 November 1905 and a 1 December 1905 restart was planned. Along with the other halts on the Varsity line, the station was closed on 1 January 1917 as a wartime economy measure. It reopened on 5 May 1919 but closed again and to goods traffic on 5 May 1941.

Preceding station	Historical railways	Following station
Ridgmont	London and North Western Railway; Varsity line	Aspley Guise
