= Lidlington railway station =

Railway station in Bedfordshire, England

Lidlington
- The former station building at Lidlington station, now a private home.

General information
- Location: Lidlington, Central Bedfordshire; England
- Coordinates: 52.042°N 0.559°W
- Grid reference: SP989391
- Manager: London Northwestern Railway
- Platforms: 2

Other information
- Station code: LID
- Classification: DfT category F2

Passengers
- 2021/22: ▲9,544
- 2022/23: ▲11,542
- 2023/24: ▼8,206
- 2024/25: ▲16,576
- 2025/26: ▲19,446
Location
Notes
- Passenger statistics from the Office of Rail and Road

Lidlington railway station serves the village of Lidlington in Bedfordshire, England. The station's two platforms once faced each other, either side of the double tracks. This has since been modified to have staggered platforms either side of the level crossing in order to reduce the time the barriers spend down.

The former station building is now a private home.

== History ==
Opened in 1846 by the Bedford Railway, it became part of the London, Midland and Scottish Railway in the 1923 Grouping. The station passed to the London Midland Region of British Railways on nationalisation in 1948.

Lidlington station had a station building, one of four of the same design that are unique to this line. The station building is in a half-timbered Gothic Revival style that had been insisted upon by the 7th Duke of Bedford for stations close to the Woburn Estate. The station building is now a private home.

== Services ==
All services at Lidlington are operated by London Northwestern Railway.

The typical off-peak service is one train per hour in each direction between Bletchley and Bedford which runs on weekdays and Saturdays only using Class 150 DMUs. There is no Sunday service.

Preceding station	National Rail	Following station
Ridgmont towards Bletchley	London Northwestern Railway Marston Vale Line Monday–Saturday only	Millbrook (Bedfordshire) towards Bedford

== Community Rail Partnership ==
Lidlington station, in common with others on the Marston Vale Line, is covered by the Marston Vale Community Rail Partnership, which aims to increase use of the line by involving local people.

== Future proposals ==
The station is proposed to be relocated for the East West Rail programme.
