= Bow Brickhill railway station =

Railway station in Buckinghamshire, England

Bow Brickhill
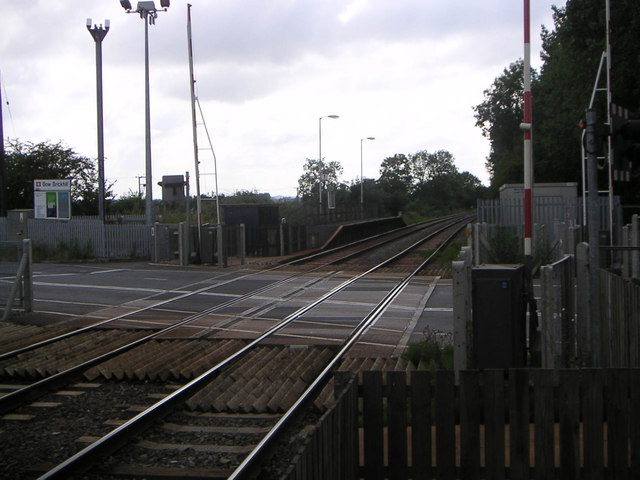

General information
- Location: Bow Brickhill, City of Milton Keynes; England
- Coordinates: 52.004°N 0.696°W
- Grid reference: SP895347
- Manager: London Northwestern Railway
- Platforms: 2

Other information
- Station code: BWB
- Classification: DfT category F2

Key dates
- 30 November 1905: Opened
- 1 January 1917: Closed
- 1 May 1919: Reopened

Passengers
- 2021/22: ▲17,046
- 2022/23: ▲18,532
- 2023/24: ▼13,274
- 2024/25: ▲32,874
- 2025/26: ▲39,406
Location
Notes
- Passenger statistics from the Office of Rail and Road

Bow Brickhill railway station is a railway station that serves the civil parishes of Bow Brickhill and Walton in the City of Milton Keynes, Buckinghamshire, England. It is on the Bletchley — Bedford Marston Vale line, about 2 miles (3.25 km) east of Bletchley.

The station is served by London Northwestern Railway local services from Bletchley to Bedford. Services are operated using Class 150 multiple units. This station is one of the seven stations serving the Milton Keynes urban area. (Note: The others are Wolverton, Milton Keynes Central, Bletchley, Fenny Stratford, Woburn Sands and Aspley Guise)

== History ==
The London and North Western Railway opened Bow Brickhill station in 1905, significantly later than many other stations on the branch. It was one of seven halts built for the introduction of a steam rail motor service over the line. It closed temporarily during the first World War as an economy measure, from Jan 1917 to May 1919. Bow Brickhill lost its staffing and gated level crossing to modernisation in the 1980s, and since then the station has been unstaffed except for two security cameras operated from other stations.

Until 2004 Bow Brickhill was unique on the line for having staggered platforms. The purpose of this is so that road traffic on the level crossing is not held up by trains standing still in the platform. However recently a number of other stations on the line including Aspley Guise have been rebuilt to have their platforms staggered also as part of the Bedford-Bletchley route modernisation.

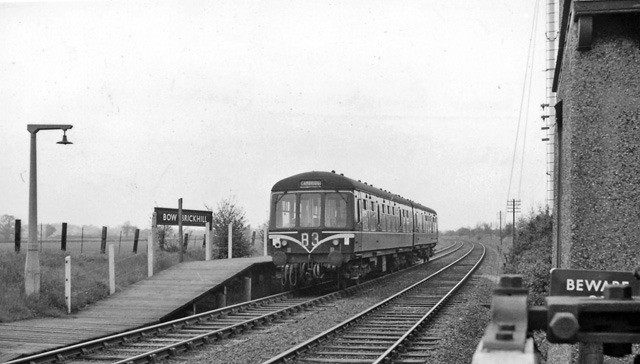
Bow Brickhill in 1962

Another oddity about Bow Brickill is that the road crossing here, the V10 Brickhill Street, has a roundabout immediately on either side of the crossing. This causes traffic jams whenever the crossing barriers are down, as each roundabout clogs with the traffic queue and remains so for up to ten minutes. Milton Keynes Council has a long-term plan for the level crossing to be replaced with a bridge, but the Transport and Works Act Order for East West Rail exempts Network Rail from any obligation to provide such a bridge as part of its works on revitalising this line.

== Future ==
In its November 2025 update, the East West Rail company announced an intention close Bow Brickhill station. Passengers will be invited to use a new Woburn Sands railway station on the west side of Woburn Sands (and a broadly similar distance from Bow Brickhill village). The update also announced that the status of the level crossing and the need for a bridge are being reconsidered (and that this is the reason why the station needs closing).

== Services ==
All services at Bow Brickhill are operated by London Northwestern Railway.

The typical off-peak service is one train per hour in each direction between Bletchley and Bedford which runs on weekdays and Saturdays only using Class 150 DMUs. There is no Sunday service.

Preceding station	National Rail	Following station
Fenny Stratford towards Bletchley	London Northwestern Railway Marston Vale Line Monday–Saturday only	Woburn Sands towards Bedford

== Community Rail Partnership ==
Bow Brickhill station, in common with others on the Marston Vale Line, is covered by the Marston Vale Community Rail Partnership, which aims to increase use of the line by involving local people.

== Location ==
The station is on Brickhill Street (V10) near its junction with Station Road, about 0.5 miles (0.8 km) west of Bow Brickhill. The nearest post-code is MK17 9FH. In the chainage notation traditionally used on the railway, it is 2 miles 1 chain (2.01 mi; 3.24 km) from Bletchley station on the line to Bedford.
