= Glebe Farm =

Glebe Farm may refer to:

== Places ==
- Glebe Farm and Tile Cross (ward) in Birmingham, England
- Glebe Farm 40B, a shared First Nations reserve in Ontario, Canada
- Glebe Farm, Milton Keynes, a district of Milton Keynes in Buckinghamshire, England
- Glebe Farm, Wilmcote, the farmhouse of Mary Shakespeare, mother of William Shakespeare, Warwickshire, England

== Other uses ==
- The Glebe Farm, an 1830 painting by John Constable
