= Eagle Farm, Milton Keynes =

Neighbourhood in Milton Keynes, England

Coordinates: 52.0340°N 0.6515°W

Eagle Farm
- Location within Buckinghamshire
- Interactive map of Eagle Farm
- OS grid reference: SP926381
- Civil parish: Wavendon
- Unitary authority: Milton Keynes
- Ceremonial county: Buckinghamshire
- Region: South East
- Country: England
- Sovereign state: United Kingdom
- Post town: MILTON KEYNES
- Postcode district: MK17
- Dialling code: 01908
- Police: Thames Valley
- Fire: Buckinghamshire
- Ambulance: South Central
- UK Parliament: Milton Keynes Central

Eagle Farm is a district of south-east Milton Keynes in Buckinghamshire, England, within the Wavendon civil parish. It was built to help the Milton Keynes urban area with its rapid increase in demand for housing. The site is part of the "Eastern Expansion Area" of Milton Keynes, identified in 2004 by the then government. The district has a primary school, St Mary's C of E Primary, with space for 600 pupils.

== Location ==
The district lies opposite the Magna Park distribution centre, on the other side of the A421, and close to the M1. It shares an area contained by the A421, Newport Road, Lower End Road and Cranfield Toad with the adjacent neighbourhood of Glebe Farm. It is on the eastern outskirts of Wavendon civil parish, just outside and overlooking the village itself. The nearest railway station is Woburn Sands, which is approximately 1.5 miles (2.4 km) to the south. The closest retail centre is the Kingston District Centre, approximately 1.5 miles (2.4 km) to the northwest, with Central Milton Keynes being roughly 5 miles (8.0 km) to the north-west.
