= Ridgmont railway station =

Railway station in Bedfordshire, England

Ridgmont
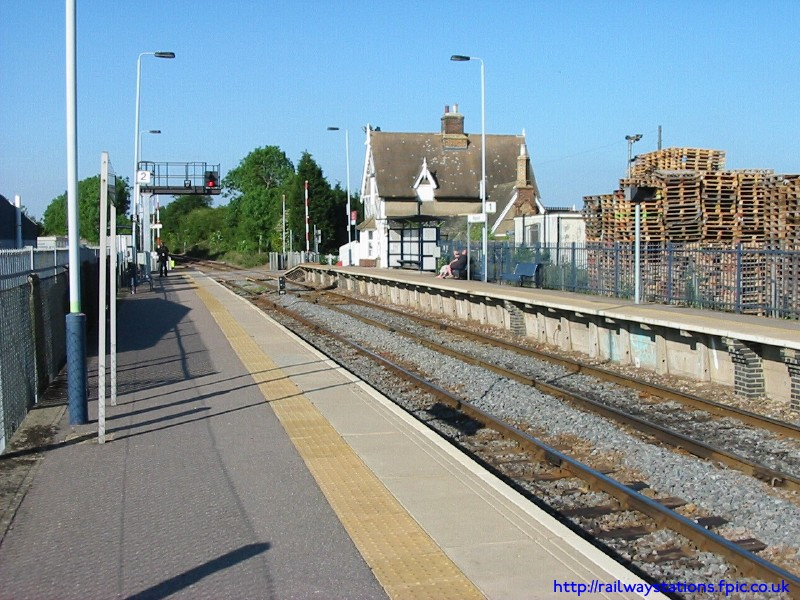

General information
- Location: Ridgmont, Central Bedfordshire; England
- Coordinates: 52.026°N 0.595°W
- Grid reference: SP965373
- Manager: London Northwestern Railway
- Platforms: 2

Other information
- Station code: RID
- Classification: DfT category F2

Passengers
- 2021/22: ▲10,604
- 2022/23: ▲11,570
- 2023/24: ▼9,142
- 2024/25: ▲17,682
- 2025/26: ▲22,344
Location
Notes
- Passenger statistics from the Office of Rail and Road

Ridgmont railway station is a small unstaffed railway station that serves the village of Ridgmont in Bedfordshire. The station is about 1 mile (2 km) away from Ridgmont on the other side of the M1 Motorway, (beside Junction 13), Brogborough and Husborne Crawley.

It is on the Bletchley — Bedford Marston Vale line.

== History ==
The station opened as Ridgemount on 18 November 1846, and was renamed to Ridgmont some time in the 1860s.

== Facilities ==
The former station house, built in 1846 in the Cottage Orné architectural style, underwent a total refurbishment in 2014 managed by the Bedfordshire Rural Communities Charity (BRCC) with funding from the Railway Heritage Trust. A tea room, gift shop, disabled access and toilets, additional car parking, two small 'start-up' offices and a meeting room have been provided. The former Victorian booking office has been restored as a small heritage centre.

== Services ==
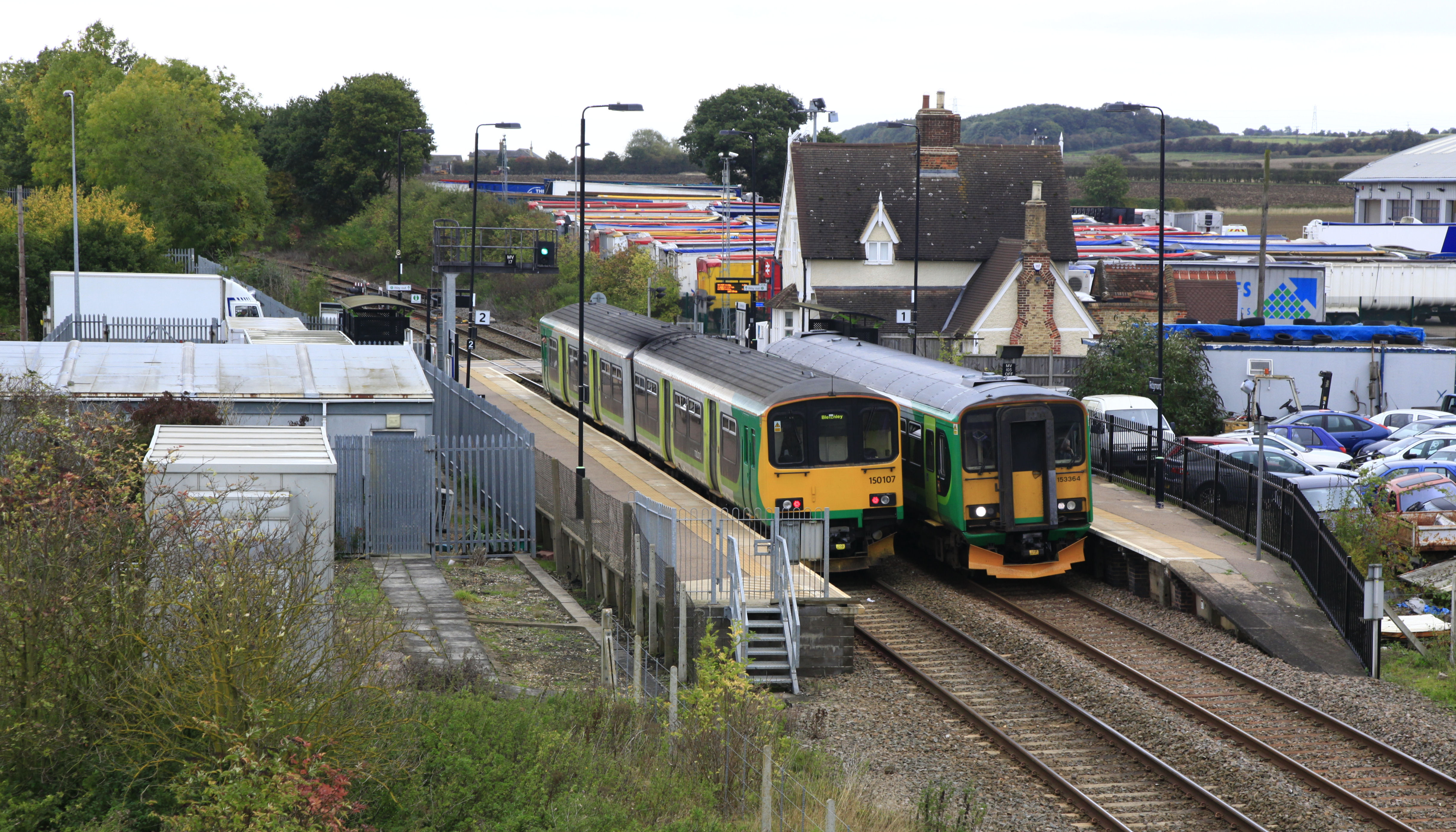
View of Ridgmont Railway Station from the A507 bypass

All services at Ridgmont are operated by London Northwestern Railway.

The typical off-peak service is one train per hour in each direction between Bletchley and Bedford which runs on weekdays and Saturdays only using Class 150 DMUs. There is no Sunday service.

As of November 2024, the stopping pattern of EWR services between Bletchley and Bedford remains to be determined, so the service pattern shown here is speculative.

Preceding station	National Rail	Following station
Aspley Guise towards Bletchley	London Northwestern Railway Marston Vale Line Monday–Saturday only	Lidlington towards Bedford
Planned future service
Woburn Sands	East West Rail Oxford to Cambridge	Stewartby

== Community Rail Partnership ==
Ridgmont station, in common with others on the Marston Vale Line, is covered by the Marston Vale Community Rail Partnership, which aims to increase use of the line by involving local people.

== Future proposals ==
It is planned that the Marston Vale line will be upgraded as part of the East West Rail programme, to permit 100 mph (160 km/h) running. The Oxford-Bedford services are planned to stop here. The station is also planned to be relocated as part of the programme.

== Bibliography ==
- Quick, Michael (2023). Railway Passenger Stations in Great Britain: A Chronology (PDF) (5th ed.). London: Railway and Canal Historical Society.
