= Fenny Stratford railway station =

Grade II listed station in Milton Keynes, England

Fenny Stratford
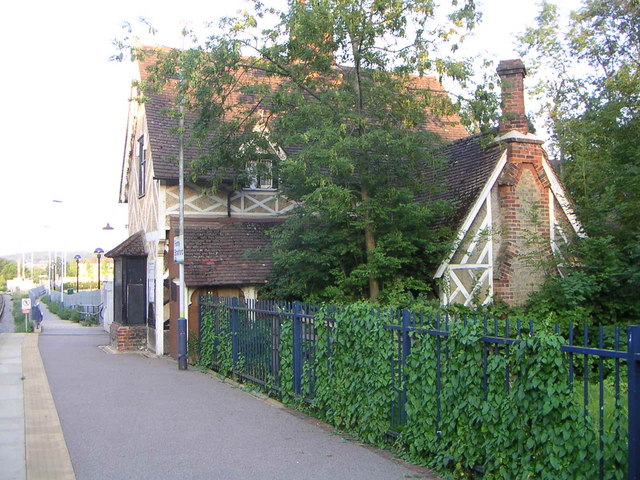

General information
- Location: Fenny Stratford, Milton Keynes; England
- Coordinates: 52.000°N 0.717°W
- Grid reference: SP881342
- Manager: London Northwestern Railway
- Platforms: 1

Other information
- Station code: FEN
- Classification: DfT category F2

Key dates
- 17 November 1846: Opened
- 22 May 1967: Goods services withdrawn
- 15 July 1968: Became unstaffed

Passengers
- 2021/22: ▲7,230
- 2022/23: ▲11,350
- 2023/24: ▼6,420
- 2024/25: ▲26,144
- 2025/26: ▲28,208
Location
Notes
- Passenger statistics from the Office of Rail and Road

Fenny Stratford is a railway station that serves the Fenny Stratford area of Milton Keynes, Buckinghamshire. It is on the Marston Vale line that links Bletchley and Bedford, about one mile (1.7 km) east of Bletchley railway station.

This station is one of seven serving the Milton Keynes urban area. The others are Wolverton, Milton Keynes Central, Bletchley, Bow Brickhill, Woburn Sands and Aspley Guise.

== Services ==
All services at Fenny Stratford are operated by London Northwestern Railway.

The typical off-peak service is one train per hour in each direction between Bletchley and Bedford which runs on weekdays and Saturdays only using Class 150 DMUs. There is no Sunday service.

Preceding station	National Rail	Following station
Bletchley Terminus	London Northwestern Railway Marston Vale Line Monday–Saturday only	Bow Brickhill towards Bedford

== History ==
Opened in 1846 by the Bedford Railway, Fenny Stratford station is just over 1 mile (1.6 km) from Bletchley. The station buildings are in a half-timbered Gothic Revival style that had been insisted upon by the 7th Duke of Bedford for stations close to the Woburn Estate. The buildings are now residential and Grade II listed. West of the station is Watling Street, which was raised by some 6 feet 8 inches (2.03 m) to allow the railway to pass beneath; immediately west of Stag bridge in the direction of Bletchley are points leading onto the disused freight-only railway line toward Oxford via the Bletchley Flyover. The passenger line and station are protected here by trap points, but they are sited such that any runaway train caught by it would subsequently crash into the bridge.

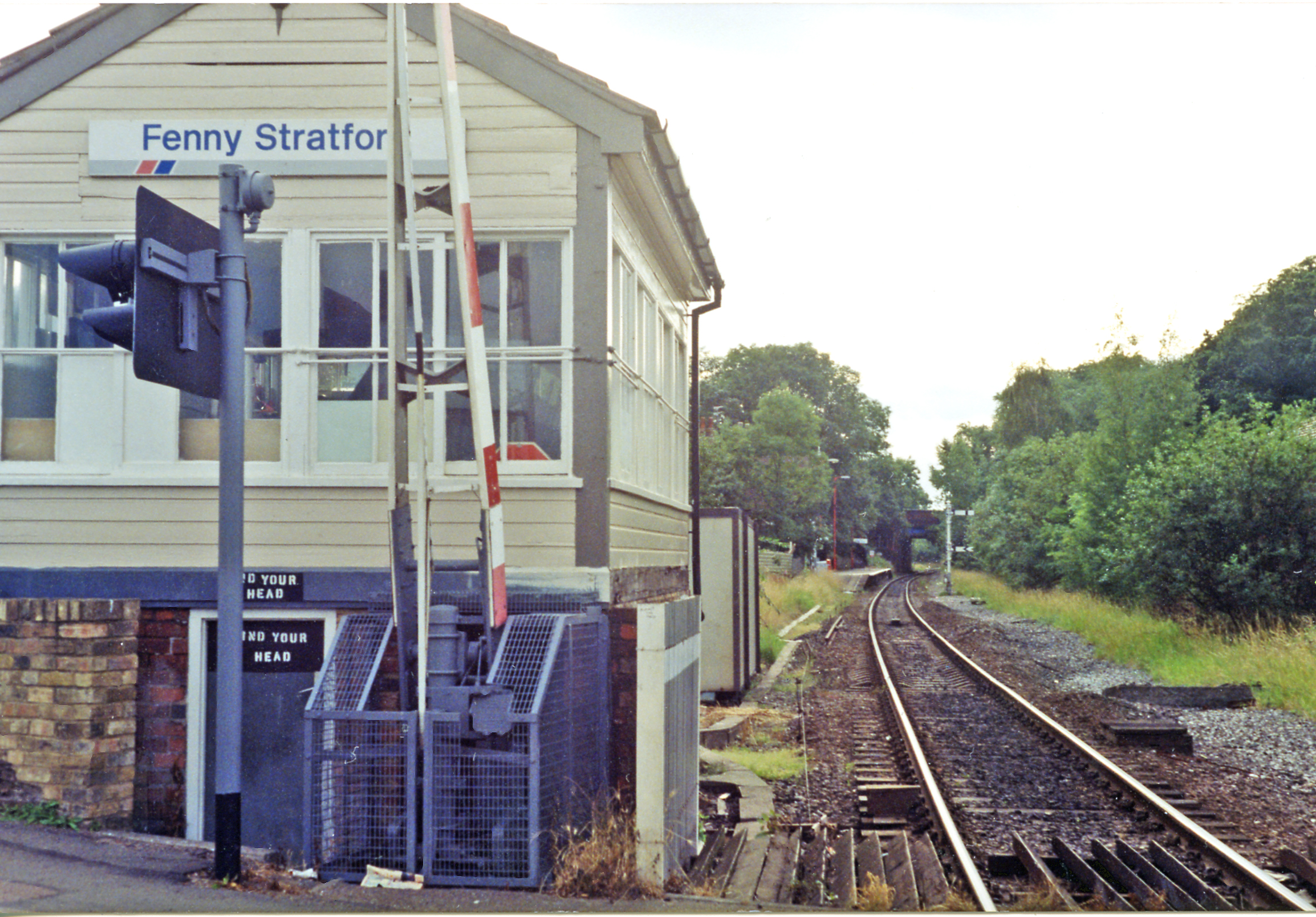
The signal box and station in 1991 facing Bletchley.

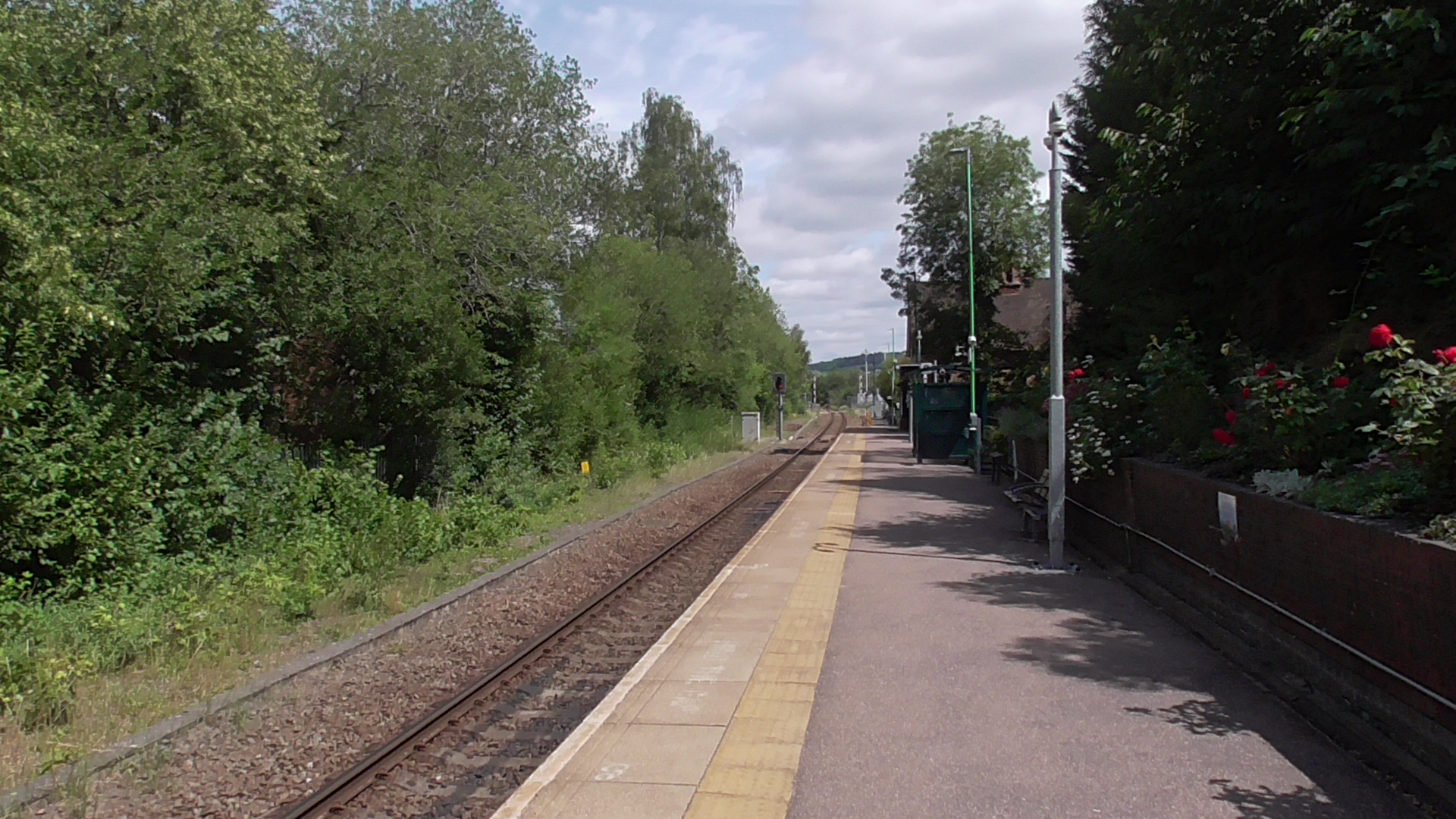
View of the platform facing Bedford in early July 2026.

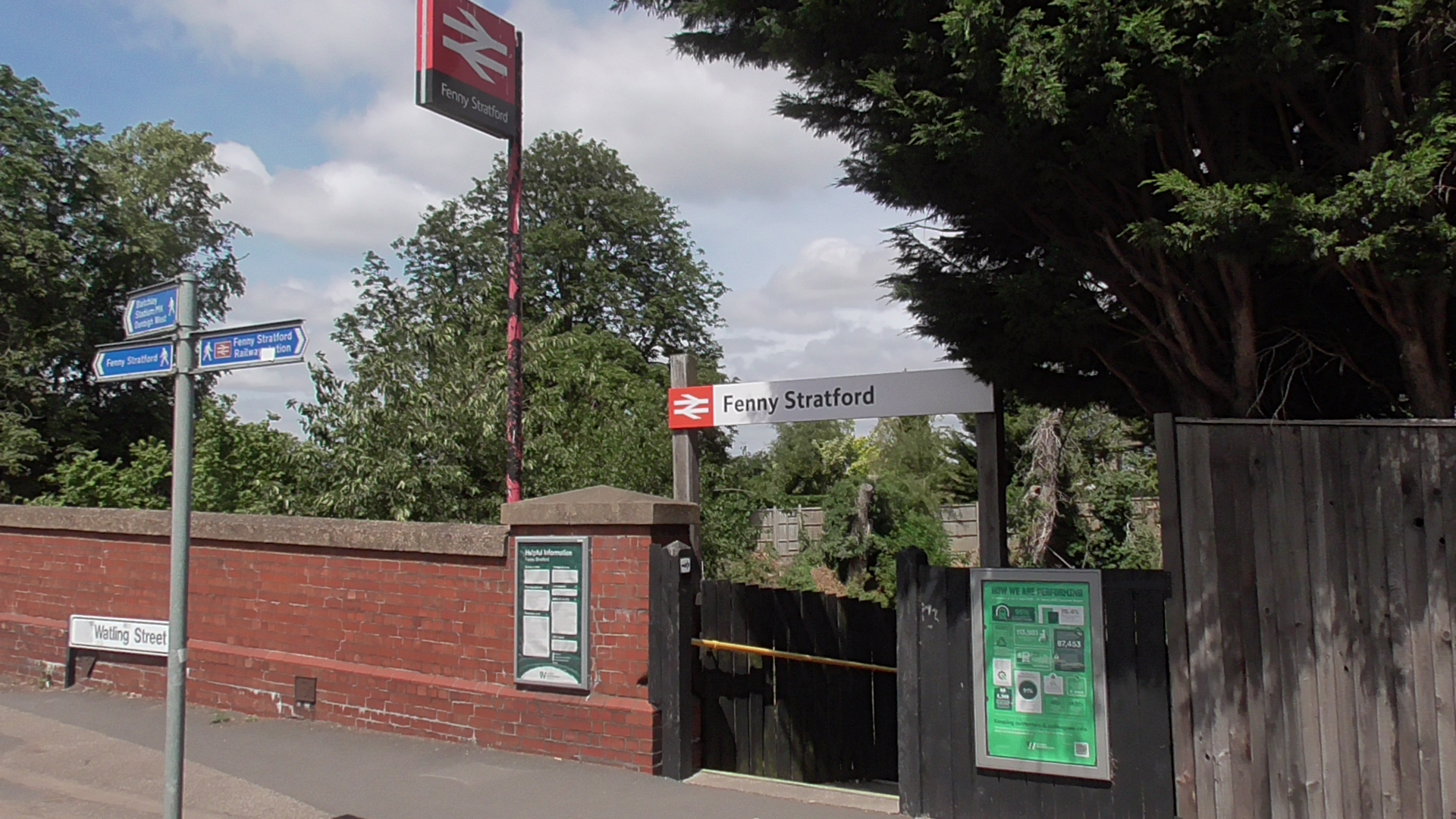
Watling Street entrance in early July 2026.

The station was originally built with staggered platforms, a wedge-shaped down platform being near the Simpson Road level crossing to the east. The platforms were rebuilt in 1948 so that they faced each other in the conventional side platform arrangement. One platform was taken out of service in the 1960s, as were a number of sidings. Fenny Stratford was reduced to an unstaffed halt in 1968, freight facilities having been withdrawn the previous year. As of March 2018, the station remains unstaffed. All that now remains is one platform and an area of wasteland east of the station, before Simpson Road crossing, which was controlled by a now demolished signal box that was taken out of service in 2004.

=== Accidents and incidents ===
The station was the site of an accident on a7 December 1925 at 8.43 pm when a bus crashed through the closed crossing gates on Simpson Road and collided with the 6.30 pm train from Cambridge to Bletchley. Six people in the bus, including the driver, were killed instantly, and four others were seriously injured. The train, however, was undamaged.

== Marston Vale line ==
Fenny Stratford station, in common with others on the Marston Vale Line, is covered by the Marston Vale Community Rail Partnership, which aims to increase use of the line by involving local people and the train companies.

As of January 2016, the line through the station is single track (from Bletchley to just east of the A5, from whence it is double track until just short of Bedford St Johns).

== Future ==
In its November 2025 update, the East West Rail company announced an intention close Fenny Stratford station, to release space for full two track operation to Bletchley.

== Location ==
The station is on Watling Street near its junction with Aylesbury Street. The nearest post-code is MK2 2XE. In the chainage notation traditionally used on the railway, it is 1 mile 1 chain (1.01 mi; 1.63 km) from Bletchley station on the line to Bedford.
