= Wavendon =

Village and civil parish in Bucks

Coordinates: 52°01′31″N 0°40′27″W

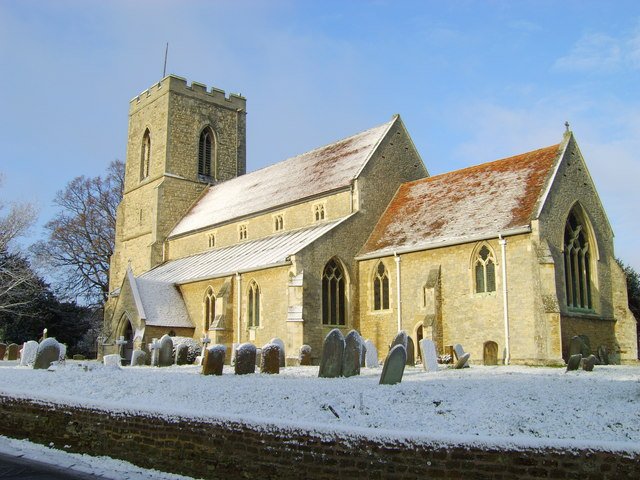
- Church of St Mary, Wavendon

- Location within Buckinghamshire
- Interactive map of Wavendon
- Population: 2,343 (2021 census)
- OS grid reference: SP910371
- Civil parish: Wavendon
- District: City of Milton Keynes
- Unitary authority: Milton Keynes City Council
- Ceremonial county: Buckinghamshire
- Region: South East
- Country: England
- Sovereign state: United Kingdom
- Post town: MILTON KEYNES
- Postcode district: MK17
- Dialling code: 01908
- Police: Thames Valley
- Fire: Buckinghamshire
- Ambulance: South Central
- UK Parliament: Milton Keynes Central

Wavendon is a village and civil parish in the south east of the Milton Keynes urban area, in Buckinghamshire, England.

== History and geography ==
The village name is an Old English language word, and means 'Wafa's hill'. In the Anglo-Saxon Chronicle in 969 the village was recorded as Wafandun. The ancient village lies just outside the 1967 designated area of Milton Keynes. The ecclesiastic parish of Wavendon anciently contained the hamlet of Woburn Sands (originally known as 'Hogsty End, Wavendon'), which became a separate civil parish in 1907. The parishes are separated by the Marston Vale line.

=== Wavendon Tower ===
Wavendon Tower is a large country house with substantial modern additions on the edge of the village. During the Second World War it was used as a recording studio for black propaganda. From 1969 to the late 1970s, it was the base for the Milton Keynes Development Corporation. Until 2011 it was an operating centre for Scicon (subsequently EDS). In 2012, Landar Limited, an automotive management consultancy, moved into Wavendon Tower.

== Expansion plans for Milton Keynes ==
In the 2004 expansion plans for Milton Keynes, it was proposed that Wavendon would become a neighbourhood centre of the city, in a similar way to the other towns and villages that provided the roots of early Milton Keynes districts. However, following the 2010 general election, the new Conservative/Liberal Democrat coalition government cancelled the expansion plans of the outgoing Labour government. Subsequent development has occurred in a piecemeal fashion.

In 2012, Milton Keynes Borough Council approved parish council proposals for development near the village.

Since the 2011 National Census, the Office for National Statistics has shown Wavendon as part of the Milton Keynes built-up area.

=== Magna Park ===
Magna Park is a large distribution site on the part of Wavendon civil parish north of the A421 (and in the 'Eastern Expansion Area', one element of the expansion plans for Milton Keynes that has gone ahead). In 2012 its occupants included John Lewis and River Island, both of which have very large distribution centres. As of January 2020, AG Barr, Amazon, H&M and Waitrose have joined them. The site is at the south-east edge of Milton Keynes, with the A421 connecting it to Bedford and the M1 via Junction 13 (about 2.5 miles (4.0 km)) to the east, and the rest of Milton Keynes, Buckingham and the A5 to the west.

=== Housing developments ===
Following an increase in housing demand in the Milton Keynes urban area, the Wavendon civil parish has undergone major development, including the construction of two new estates (Eagle Farm and Glebe Farm) on its eastern outskirts. Milton Keynes City Council regards this part of the parish as a major part of Milton Keynes' "Eastern Expansion Area".

== The Stables ==
Jazz artists John Dankworth and Cleo Laine shared a home in Wavendon from the late 1960s. The couple founded The Stables as a live venue in 1970 in what was the old stables block in the grounds of their home. It was an immediate success with forty-seven concerts given in the first year.

The venue was completely rebuilt in 2000, with a subsequent development in 2007 to create Stage 2. Each year, the venue presents over 350 concerts and around 250 education events in its two auditoria including summer schools; the 400 seat Jim Marshall Auditorium, and smaller studio space at Stage 2. Dame Cleo Laine continued to live in the village until her death in 2025.

== See also ==
- Wavendon Gate district is in the adjacent parish of Walton
- Presles-en-Brie, France, is twinned with Wavendon
- Eagle Farm, a housing estate on the outskirts of the civil parish.
- Glebe Farm, a housing estate on the outskirts of the civil parish.
