= Woburn Sands railway station =

Railway station in Buckinghamshire, England

Woburn Sands
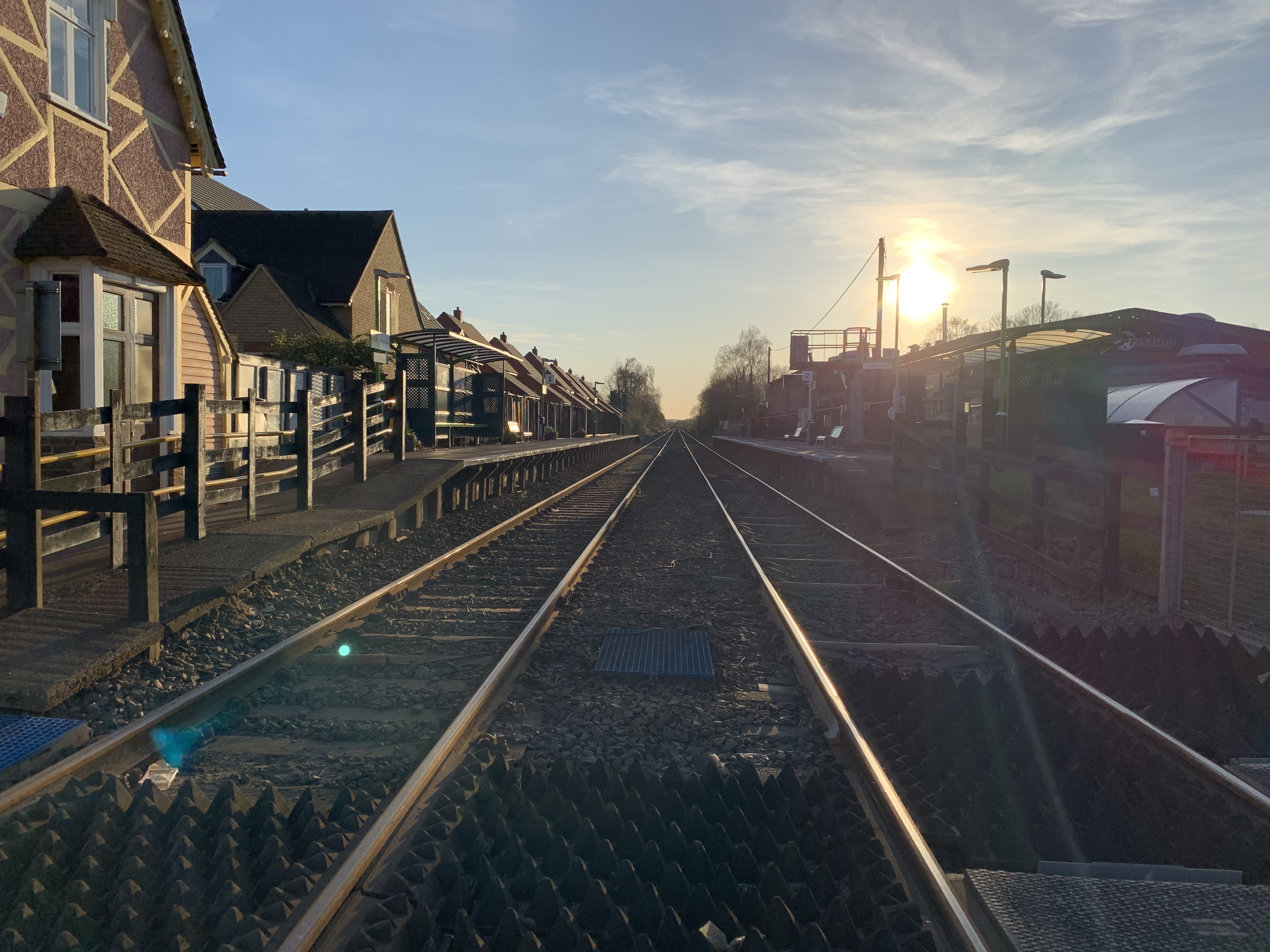
- Woburn Sands in 2020, looking west showing the double track and platforms 1 & 2

General information
- Location: Woburn Sands, City of Milton Keynes; England
- Coordinates: 52.018°N 0.654°W
- Grid reference: SP924363
- Manager: London Northwestern Railway
- Platforms: 2

Other information
- Station code: WOB
- Classification: DfT category F2

Key dates
- 1846: Opened

Passengers
- 2021/22: ▲19,718
- 2022/23: ▲24,618
- 2023/24: ▼19,576
- 2024/25: ▲47,880
- 2025/26: ▲50,840
Location
Notes
- Passenger statistics from the Office of Rail and Road

Woburn Sands railway station serves the town of Woburn Sands and the village of Wavendon in the City of Milton Keynes in Buckinghamshire, England. The station is on the Marston Vale line between Bedford and Bletchley, about 4 miles (6.5 km) east of Bletchley station. The station is served by local trains to Bletchley and Bedford using Class 150 multiple units. This station is one of the seven stations serving the Milton Keynes urban area. (Note: The others are Aspley Guise, Wolverton, Milton Keynes Central, Bletchley, Fenny Stratford and Bow Brickhill.)

== History ==
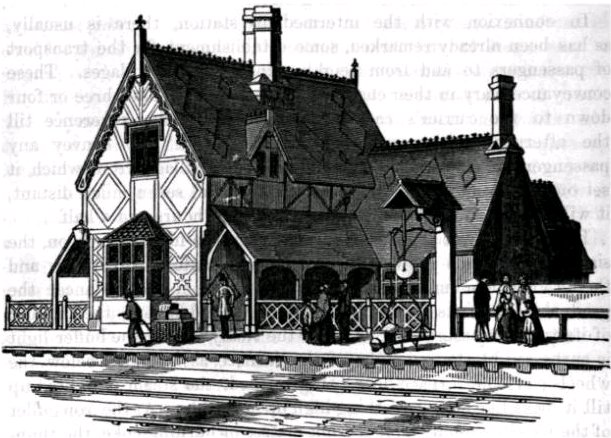
Woburn Sands' cottage-type station building, in an 1852 illustration

It opened with the line in 1846; between 1871 and July 1967 had a sizeable goods yard serving various local businesses (including a brick factory and gas works).

Woburn Sands has a black and white "cottage" station building, one of four of the same design that are unique to this line. Two of the others remain at Fenny Stratford and Milbrook. The building is in a half-timbered Gothic Revival style that had been insisted upon by the 7th Duke of Bedford for stations close to the Woburn Estate.

It is Grade II listed.

In August 2004, Woburn Sands lost its Victorian signal box to the development and modernisation of the route. Until 2004 the line was controlled by staffed signal boxes located at various stations; but the entire line is now controlled from one signalling centre at Ridgmont.

=== Station Hotel ===
The Fenny Stratford Times featured the hotel in 1883. It described the hotel building as Gothic style, constructed of red bricks with Bath stone ornamentation. The lobby had a caustic tile floor with "station hotel" in the design. Off the central hall was a tap-room and a bar with adjoining snug parlour. At the end of the hall a staircase led to the first floor which had seven rooms for accommodation. At the rear was a yard, stabling and coach houses. The architect was a Mr Mercer of Bedford and the first owner, John Taylor Luttman.

== Location ==
The station is on Station Road, about 0.5 miles (0.8 km) from the town centre. The nearest post-code is MK17 8UD. In the chainage notation traditionally used on the railway, it is 4 miles 4 chains (4.05 mi; 6.52 km) from Bletchley station on the line to Bedford.

== Services ==
All services at Woburn Sands are operated by London Northwestern Railway.

The typical off-peak service is one train per hour in each direction between Bletchley and Bedford which runs on weekdays and Saturdays only using Class 150 DMUs. There is no Sunday service.

| Preceding station | National Rail | Following station |
|---|---|---|
| Bow Brickhill towards Bletchley | London Northwestern Railway Marston Vale Line Monday–Saturday only | Aspley Guise towards Bedford |
Planned future service
| Bletchley | East West Rail Oxford to Cambridge | Ridgmont |

== Community Rail Partnership ==
Woburn Sands station, in common with others on the Marston Vale line, is covered by the Marston Vale Community Rail Partnership, which aims to increase use of the line by involving local people.

== Future proposals ==
The station is planned to be relocated under proposals for East West Rail.
