= Aspley Guise railway station =

Railway station in Bedfordshire, England

Aspley Guise
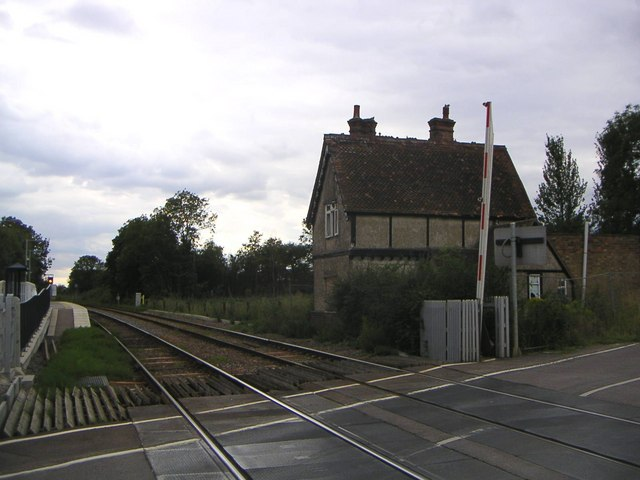

General information
- Location: Aspley Guise, Central Bedfordshire; England
- Coordinates: 52.021°N 0.632°W
- Grid reference: SP939367
- Manager: London Northwestern Railway
- Platforms: 2

Other information
- Station code: APG
- Classification: DfT category F2

Key dates
- 1905: Station opened
- 1 January 1917: Station closed
- 5 May 1919: Station reopened

Passengers
- 2021/22: ▲4,146
- 2022/23: ▲4,650
- 2023/24: ▼3,320
- 2024/25: ▲8,300
- 2025/26: ▼7,604
Location
Notes
- Passenger statistics from the Office of Rail and Road

Aspley Guise railway station serves the village of Aspley Guise in Bedfordshire, England. It is on the Bletchley – Bedford Marston Vale Line. The station is served by West Midlands Trains local services, operating under the London Northwestern Railway brand. The services operate using Class 150 diesel-electric multiple unit trains. It is one of the seven stations serving the Milton Keynes urban area, (Note: The others are Milton Keynes Central, Bletchley, Wolverton, Fenny Stratford, Bow Brickhill and Woburn Sands) albeit the only one located outside the City of Milton Keynes and Buckinghamshire.

In 2016/17, the station was the least used in Bedfordshire.

== History ==
Opened by the London and North Western Railway in October 1905, it became part of the London, Midland and Scottish Railway in the 1923 Grouping. The station passed to the London Midland Region of British Railways on nationalisation in 1948.

It was built initially as one of seven new halts for a steam rail motor service between Bedford & Bletchley inaugurated in the autumn of 1905 and was initially constructed of old sleepers; it temporarily closed for two years (January 1917-May 1919) as a World War 1 economy measure. Under LMS auspices, it had its platforms rebuilt and these were lengthened again by BR in 1959.

When Sectorisation was introduced in the 1980s, the station was served by Network SouthEast until the Privatisation of British Railways. The initial operating franchise was awarded to Silverlink County; the franchise was transferred to London Midland on 11 November 2007.

== Services ==
All services at Aspley Guise are operated by London Northwestern Railway.

The typical off-peak service is one train per hour in each direction between Bletchley and Bedford which runs on weekdays and Saturdays only using Class 150 DMUs. There is no Sunday service.

Preceding station	National Rail	Following station
Woburn Sands towards Bletchley	London Northwestern Railway Marston Vale Line Monday–Saturday only	Ridgmont towards Bedford

== Community Rail Partnership ==
Aspley Guise station, in common with others on the Marston Vale Line, is covered by the Marston Vale Community Rail Partnership, which aims to increase use of the line by involving local people.

== Sources ==
- Butt, R. V. J. (October 1995). The Directory of Railway Stations: details every public and private passenger station, halt, platform and stopping place, past and present (1st ed.). Sparkford: Patrick Stephens Ltd. ISBN 978-1-85260-508-7. OCLC 60251199. OL 11956311M.
- Jowett, Alan (2000). Jowett's Nationalised Railway Atlas (1st ed.). Penryn, Cornwall: Atlantic Transport Publishers. ISBN 978-0-906899-99-1. OCLC 228266687.
- Jowett, Alan (March 1989). Jowett's Railway Atlas of Great Britain and Ireland: From Pre-Grouping to the Present Day (1st ed.). Sparkford: Patrick Stephens Ltd. ISBN 978-1-85260-086-0. OCLC 22311137.
