= Hugh de Beauchamp =

12th-century Anglo-Norman nobleman

Hugh de Beauchamp was an Anglo-Norman feudal lord of Abergavenny in the Welsh Marches in the late 12th century.

Hugh was a member of the large Beauchamp dynasty but his parentage is as yet unknown or unproven. Hugh became lord of Abergavenny after the deaths without issue of the sons of Miles de Gloucester, 1st Earl of Hereford. Hugh in turn died or was killed around 1173, when Abergavenny Castle was seized by the Welsh.
