= Woburn Sands =

Town in Buckinghamshire and Bedfordshire, England

Coordinates: 52.015°N 0.649°W

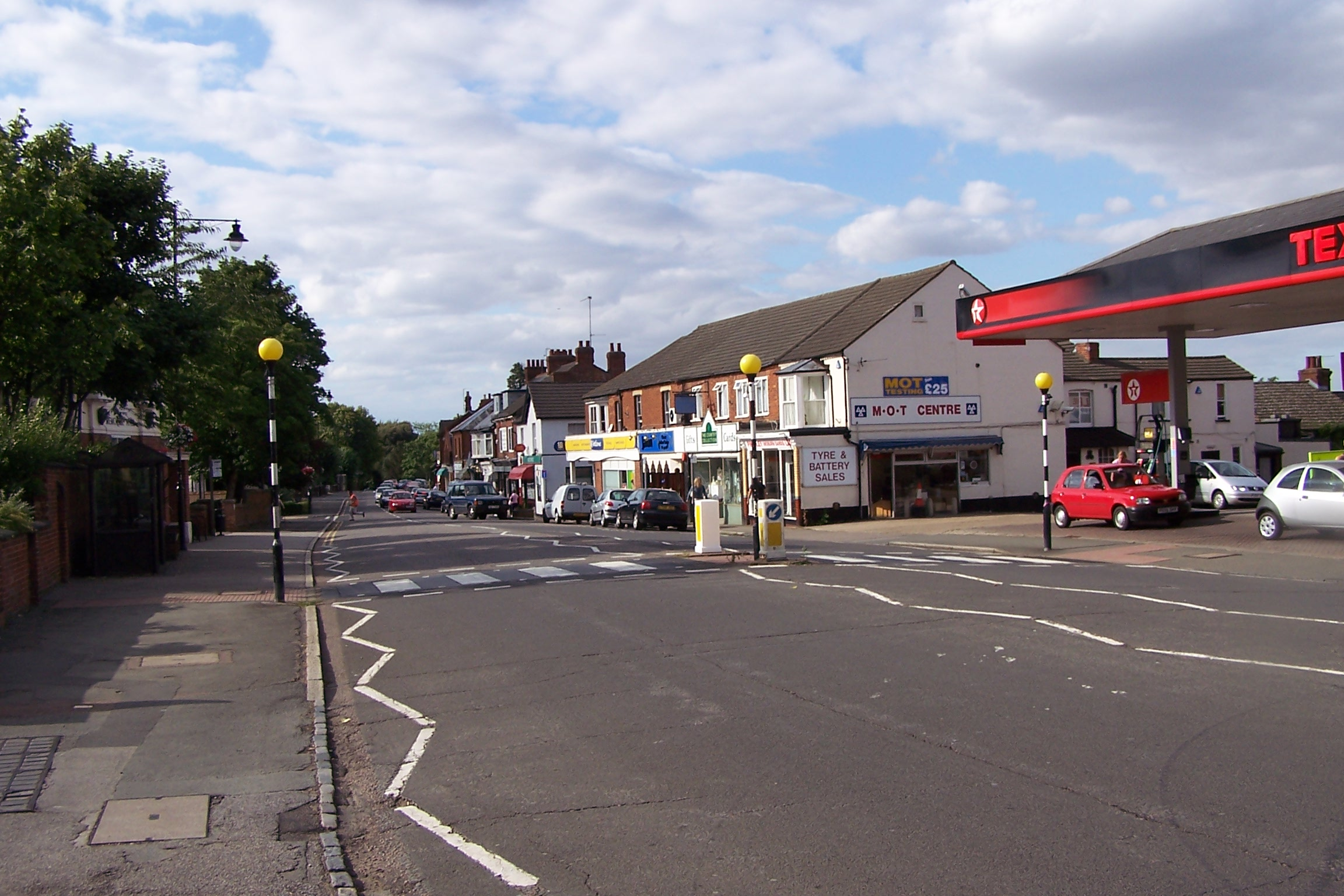
- Woburn Sands High Street

- Location within Buckinghamshire
- Woburn Sands CP
- Population: 3,646 (parish only); 4,310 (contiguous built-up area). (2021 census)
- OS grid reference: SP927360
- Civil parish: Woburn Sands; Aspley Guise; Aspley Heath
- District: City of Milton Keynes
- Unitary authority: Milton Keynes City Council; Central Bedfordshire Council
- Ceremonial county: Buckinghamshire; Bedfordshire
- Region: South East
- Country: England
- Sovereign state: United Kingdom
- Post town: MILTON KEYNES
- Postcode district: MK17
- Dialling code: 01908
- Police: Thames Valley
- Fire: Buckinghamshire
- Ambulance: South Central
- UK Parliament: Milton Keynes Central Mid Bedfordshire
- Website: Woburn Sands Town Council

Woburn Sands (/ˈwoʊbərn/) is a town that straddles the border between Buckinghamshire and Bedfordshire in England, and is part of the Milton Keynes urban area. The larger part of the town is in Woburn Sands civil parish, which is in the City of Milton Keynes, The built-up area of the town extends continuously to include much of the neighbouring parishes of Aspley Guise and Aspley Heath (in Central Bedfordshire), with no natural boundaries to set them apart. The meandering boundary between Buckinghamshire and Bedfordshire means the Lower and Middle Schools that serve all of the town are both in Aspley Guise CP. Bedfordshire Police and Thames Valley Police both deal with law enforcement issues in the town. At the 2021 Census, the population of the civil parish (only) was 3.646. The population of the contiguous built-up area was 4,310.

== History ==
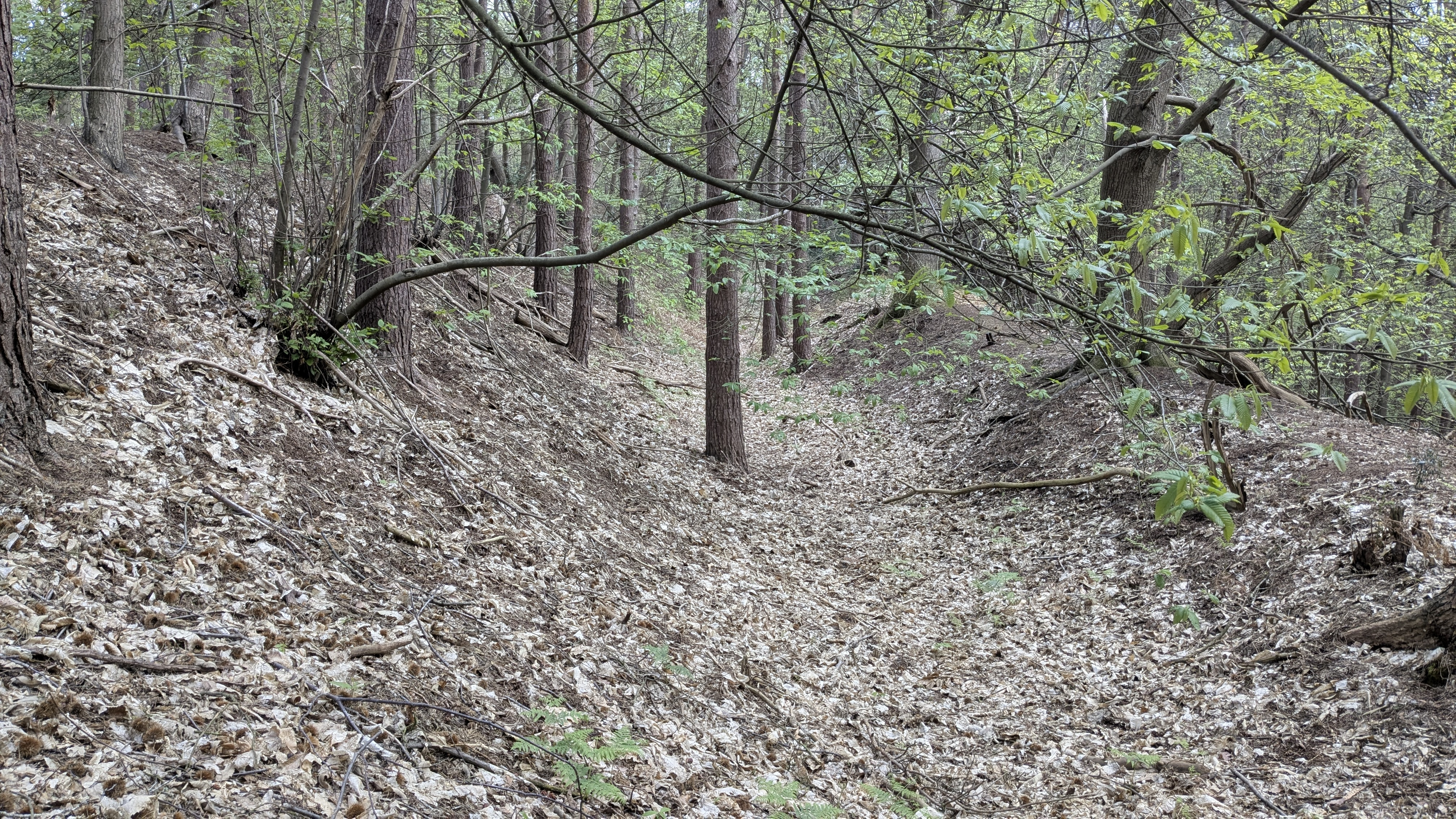
Part of the inner rampart, ditch and outer rampart of Danesborough Camp

The earliest evidence of settlement is an Iron Age hill fort, Danesborough Camp, dating from between 100 BC and 100 AD and which is located on Aspley Heath to the southwest of the present town: it is a scheduled monument.

The village name was originally Hogsty End, one of Wavendon's four 'ends' (along with Church End, Cross End and Lower End) but by Victorian times, this un-picturesque name had fallen out of favour, and Woburn Sands had taken over as the accepted name. The modern name is credited to a schoolmaster unable to attract business to his "Hogsty End Academy", and was one of the first to promote the use of the new name. Later when the settlement had developed into a hamlet, it was part of the parish of Wavendon, becoming a separate civil parish in 1907. Under the Local Government Act 1972 the parish council has adopted the status of a town in its own right. It has separated from Wavendon parish which is just to the north of the Marston Vale line.

The modern place name is related to nearby Woburn in Bedfordshire, and to the sandy local soil resulting from its proximity to the Greensand Ridge, an escarpment of Greensand that is part of the Woburn Sands Formation.

== Transport ==
=== Rail ===
The town, alongside Wavendon and the surrounding areas of south-east Milton Keynes, is served by Woburn Sands railway station. The station is on the Marston Vale line, three closely placed stops east of Bletchley railway station, a junction station with the West Coast Main Line. Inter-city services can be accessed via Milton Keynes Central, roughly 5 miles (8.0 km) north-west of the town.

=== Road ===
The town is bisected by the former A5130, which forms part of a continuous route between the A5 at Hockliffe and the A509/A4146 near Broughton, and is close to Junction 13 of the M1 motorway, about 2 mi (3 km) east of the town, accessed via local roads.

=== Bus ===
The town is served by four bus services: the hourly Arriva LOOP service, in addition to the less frequent South Beds Dial-a-Ride bus 47 between Toddington and Leighton Buzzard, Grant Palmer service 134 to Central Milton Keynes, and the Flittabus FL12 between Maulden and Central Milton Keynes.

Milton Keynes City Council also operates an on demand bus service known as "MK Connect", which serves the whole Milton Keynes unitary authority area, including most of Woburn Sands, which predominantly lies under the jurisdiction of said City Council.

== Media ==
Local television news programmes are BBC Look East and ITV News Anglia, BBC South Today and ITV News Meridian can also be received. Local radio stations are BBC Three Counties Radio on 104.5 FM, Heart East on 103.3 FM, and MKFM, a community based station which broadcast from Milton Keynes. The town is served by the local newspaper, Milton Keynes Citizen.

== Governance ==
Woburn Sands CP has been part of the Borough (now City) of Milton Keynes since 1974, which has been a unitary authority since 1997. This gives Milton Keynes City Council the responsibility for the provision of most local government services. Voters registered in the parish are represented on Milton Keynes City Council, which has (since 2014) been divided into 19 wards each carrying 3 councillors with Woburn Sands CP being part of the Danesborough and Walton ward. At the parish level, Woburn Sands CP has a town council which is based at Ellen Pettit Memorial Hall on the town's high street.

The remainder of the town (within the CPs of Aspley Guise and Aspley Heath) has formed part of Central Bedfordshire (also a unitary authority) since 2009, and is part of the Aspley and Woburn ward for elections to Central Bedfordshire Council, which provides most local government services for this area.
