= Bletchley railway station =

Railway station in Buckinghamshire, England

Bletchley
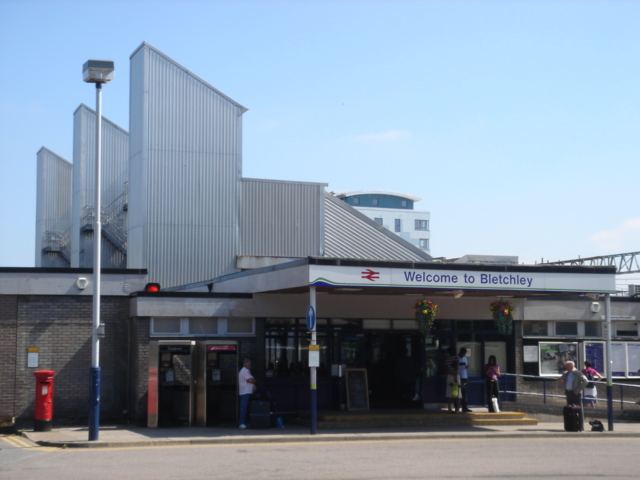

General information
- Location: West Bletchley, Milton Keynes, England
- Coordinates: 51.9953°N 0.7367°W
- Grid reference: SP868337
- Owner: Network Rail
- Manager: London Northwestern Railway
- Platforms: 8

Other information
- Station code: BLY
- Classification: DfT category C2

History
- Opened: 1838–1839
- Original company: London and Birmingham Railway
- Pre-grouping: London and North Western Railway
- Post-grouping: London, Midland and Scottish Railway

Passengers
- 2021/22: ▲0.581 million
- Interchange: ▲39,203
- 2022/23: ▲0.734 million
- Interchange: ▲58,278
- 2023/24: ▲0.965 million
- Interchange: ▼44,221
- 2024/25: ▲1.386 million
- Interchange: ▲72,052
- 2025/26: ▲1.466 million
- Interchange: ▲86,653
Location
Notes
- Passenger statistics from the Office of Rail and Road

Bletchley railway station serves southern Milton Keynes, particularly the town of Bletchley, as well as nearby villages in north-eastern Aylesbury Vale, in Buckinghamshire England. It lies 47 miles (76 km) north-west of London Euston, 32 miles (51 km) east of Oxford and 17 miles (27 km) west of Bedford. It is one of seven railway stations serving the Milton Keynes urban area. (Note: The others are Milton Keynes Central, Wolverton, Fenny Stratford, Bow Brickhill, Aspley Guise and Woburn Sands)

It includes junctions of the West Coast Main Line with the Marston Vale line to Bedford and the upcoming East West Rail link from Oxford. It is the nearest main line station for Bletchley Park, the World War II codebreaking centre and modern heritage attraction, and Stadium MK, the home of Milton Keynes Dons F.C.

== History ==
The London and Birmingham Railway, now part of the West Coast Main Line (WCML), was officially opened from London Euston as far as Denbigh Hall, approximately 1 mile (1.6 km) north of Bletchley station, on 9 April 1838, where a temporary station was built. The line was fully opened in September 1838, and Bletchley station opened some time between 2 November 1838 and 20 June 1839. The station was known as Bletchley & Fenny Stratford between 1841 and 1846 and, after the opening of the Marston Vale line, was referred to in timetables as Bletchley Junction from 1851 to 1870. Originally a major intercity station, that role passed to Milton Keynes Central in 1982 when the latter was opened, long after the east–west route had been downgraded, taking Bletchley's importance as a junction with it.

The eastward route (to Bedford St Johns) opened in 1846. The westward route (to Buckingham) opened in 1850. This east–west route subsequently became the Varsity Line between Oxford and Cambridge.

=== Former services ===
==== Connex South Central ====
In June 1997, Connex South Central began operating services between Gatwick Airport and Rugby via the Brighton and West London lines which called at Bletchley with Class 319s. It was cut back to terminate at Milton Keynes in December 2000 before being withdrawn in May 2002 due to capacity constraints on the West Coast Main Line while it was upgraded.

==== Southern ====
Southern reintroduced the service in February 2009 with Class 377s operating initially operating from Brighton to Milton Keynes before being curtailed at its southern end at South Croydon and later Clapham Junction. In May 2022, Southern cut the service back to terminate at Watford Junction, thus ceasing to serve Bletchley.

=== Accidents and incidents ===
On 14 October 1939, an express passenger train was in a collision with another train. Five people were killed and more than 30 were injured.

== Location ==
The station is on Sherwood Drive in Old Bletchley, near the B4034. In the chainage notation traditionally used on the railway, its location on the West Coast Main Line is 46 miles 54 chains (46.68 mi; 75.12 km) from Euston; to Oxford on the former Varsity line the distance is 31 miles 48 chains (31.60 mi; 50.86 km); (Note: 31 miles 22 chains from Bletchley south junction to Oxford Rewley Road plus 16 chains from Bletchley south junction to Bletchley station.) and to Bedford it is 16 miles 51 chains (16.64 mi; 26.78 km).

== Layout and facilities ==
There are four platforms in use, numbered 3 to 6 from west to east. Platforms 1 and 2, on the fast lines, see little or no use. (Bletchley does not receive intercity services.) Platforms 3 and 4 serve the WCML slow lines and are used by London Northwestern Railway services between London Euston and Birmingham New Street.

Platforms 5 and 6 are located on the eastern side and are the only ones that give access to the Marston Vale line to Bedford (though they can also be used exceptionally by main line trains). Bedford trains normally start and terminate at platform 6, but can use platform 5 if required. As of April 2024, two further platforms, serving East West Rail at high level, remain to used.

There is a lift and stairs from the ticket hall to the pedestrian bridge, with lifts and stairs down to each platform. Train arrivals and departures are announced as well as being displayed on VDUs. There are ticket barriers controlling access to the platforms.

There are carriage sidings to the north of the station (along with the Bletchley train maintenance depot). A little to the south, the Bletchley Flyover crosses over the WCML lines to carry East West Rail. The main buildings and station entrance are located on the west (Bletchley Park) side of the complex, off Sherwood Drive. An eastern entrance from central Bletchley (see below) is planned and funded.

== East West route ==
"East West Rail" is a major project to establish a strategic railway connecting East Anglia with Central, Southern and Western England. In particular, it plans to build (or rebuild) a line linking Oxford and Cambridge via Bicester, Milton Keynes (at Bletchley) and Bedford. The Oxford–Bedford aspect of the plan reuses the route of the former Varsity Line, extensively re-engineered. The section between Oxford and Bletchley is ready for use. There is a programme in progress to establish the Bletchley– Cambridge section.

A key element of the plan was to extend Bletchley station up to the flyover and build high level platforms (see below) so that passengers may transfer between the lines. The Bletchley Flyover from Oxford crosses over the WCML and by-passes the original Bletchley station, leading east towards Bedford or north to join the WCML at a junction north of the current (low-level) station. It was built in 1959 as part of the 1955 British Rail Modernisation Plan. From April 2020 to January 2021, the sections of the original flyover crossing the WCML were removed. The replacement structures were put in place in May 2021. By the end of May 2024, construction of the new building and the link bridge to the main station were complete. As of January 2026, scheduled passenger services have yet to commence, due to an industrial dispute over driver-controlled operation.

=== Marston Vale Community Rail Partnership ===
Bletchley, in common with other stations on this line, is covered by the Marston Vale Community Rail Partnership, which aims to promote the line by encouraging local users to take an active interest in it.

== Planned developments of the station ==
=== Proposed entrance from Saxon Street ===
As part of a project to regenerate Bletchley as a whole, Milton Keynes Council has proposed the creation of a new eastern pedestrian access to the station by extending the existing platform overbridge across the tracks to reach Saxon Street. The proposed eastern entrance is to open out into a new station square and a transport interchange where an at-grade pedestrian crossing across Saxon Street would give access to the town centre and bus station. In the longer term it is planned to construct an underground concourse to link the eastern and western station entrances.

In March 2021, Milton Keynes Council announced that it had secured funding for a new eastern entrance to the station that will enable direct access from Bletchley bus station and Central Bletchley.

=== Bletchley High-level ===
The plan for East West Rail provides for new high level platforms to be built on the eastern approach to the Bletchley Flyover, as the line has no direct route through the existing station without reversing.

On 7 July 2014, the South East Midlands Local Enterprise Partnership announced that the Government had allocated £64.6 million funding for various projects that includes a £1.5 million contribution towards the cost of this work.

In July 2017, Network Rail began a public consultation on the details of its proposals for the Bicester–Bedford section of East West Rail. The consultation documents provide detailed drawings for the high-level platforms but do not include any details about the station itself. (Note: There is, however, an artist's impression of the upgraded station on the East West Rail Ltd web site.)

In July 2019, VolkerFitzpatrick announced that it had been awarded a contract to build the new platforms and the link to the main line station. Work finally began in the station area in mid-2020, when demolition of the original flyover began. Work further around the curve is underway to build two new high-level platforms, to be connected to the main station by extending the existing pedestrian overbridge that gives access to the mainline platforms. In January 2021, piling works began for this extension, At the end of April 2021, the piling and foundation works were complete. By September 2022, shell construction neared completion with fit-out projected through spring 2023. At the end of May 2024, the building was "very near to completion".

== Services ==
All services at Bletchley are operated by London Northwestern Railway. The typical off-peak service in trains per hour (tph) is:

- 4 tph to London Euston (2 of these are stopping services and 2 are fast services)
- 2 tph to Milton Keynes Central
- 2 tph to Birmingham New Street via Northampton
- 1 tph to Bedford

During peak hours, a number of additional services to and from London Euston start and terminate at Bletchley.

Preceding station	National Rail	Following station
Milton Keynes Central towards Birmingham New Street	London Northwestern Railway London–Birmingham	Leighton Buzzard towards London Euston
Milton Keynes Central Terminus	London Northwestern Railway London–Milton Keynes	Leighton Buzzard towards London Euston
Terminus	London Northwestern Railway Marston Vale Line Monday–Saturday only	Fenny Stratford towards Bedford
Future services
Winslow	Chiltern Railways Milton Keynes Central–Oxford	Milton Keynes Central
	Previous services	
Milton Keynes Central	Southern Milton Keynes Central–Brighton	Leighton Buzzard
	Historical railways	
Swanbourne Line and station closed	London Midland Region of British Railways Varsity Line	Fenny Stratford Line and station open

== See also ==
- Bletchley Traction Maintenance Depot
