= Marston Vale line =

Railway line in Bedfordshire and Buckinghamshire, England

Coordinates: 52.02249°N 0.61478°W

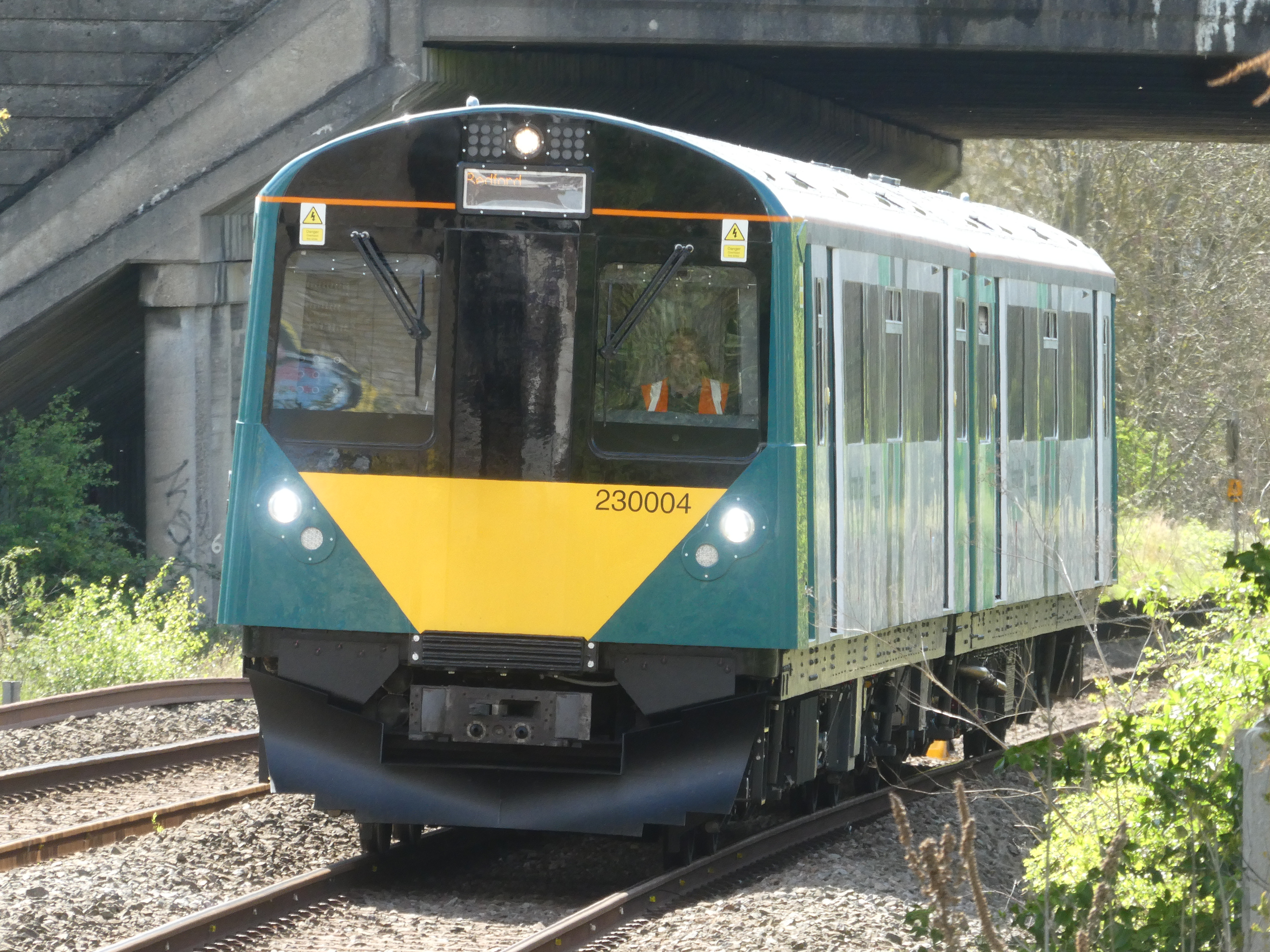
- A London Northwestern Railway Class 230 approaching Ridgmont

Overview
- Status: Operational
- Owner: Network Rail
- Locale: Bedfordshire, Buckinghamshire
- Termini: Bedford, Bletchley
- Stations: 12

Service
- Type: Heavy rail
- System: National Rail
- Operator: London Northwestern Railway
- Rolling stock: Class 150

Technical
- Line length: 16 miles 51 chains (16.64 mi; 26.78 km).
- Number of tracks: 1–2
- Character: Rural
- Track gauge: 1,435 mm (4 ft 8 1/2 in) standard gauge
- Electrification: None
- Operating speed: 60 mph (97 km/h)
Route map
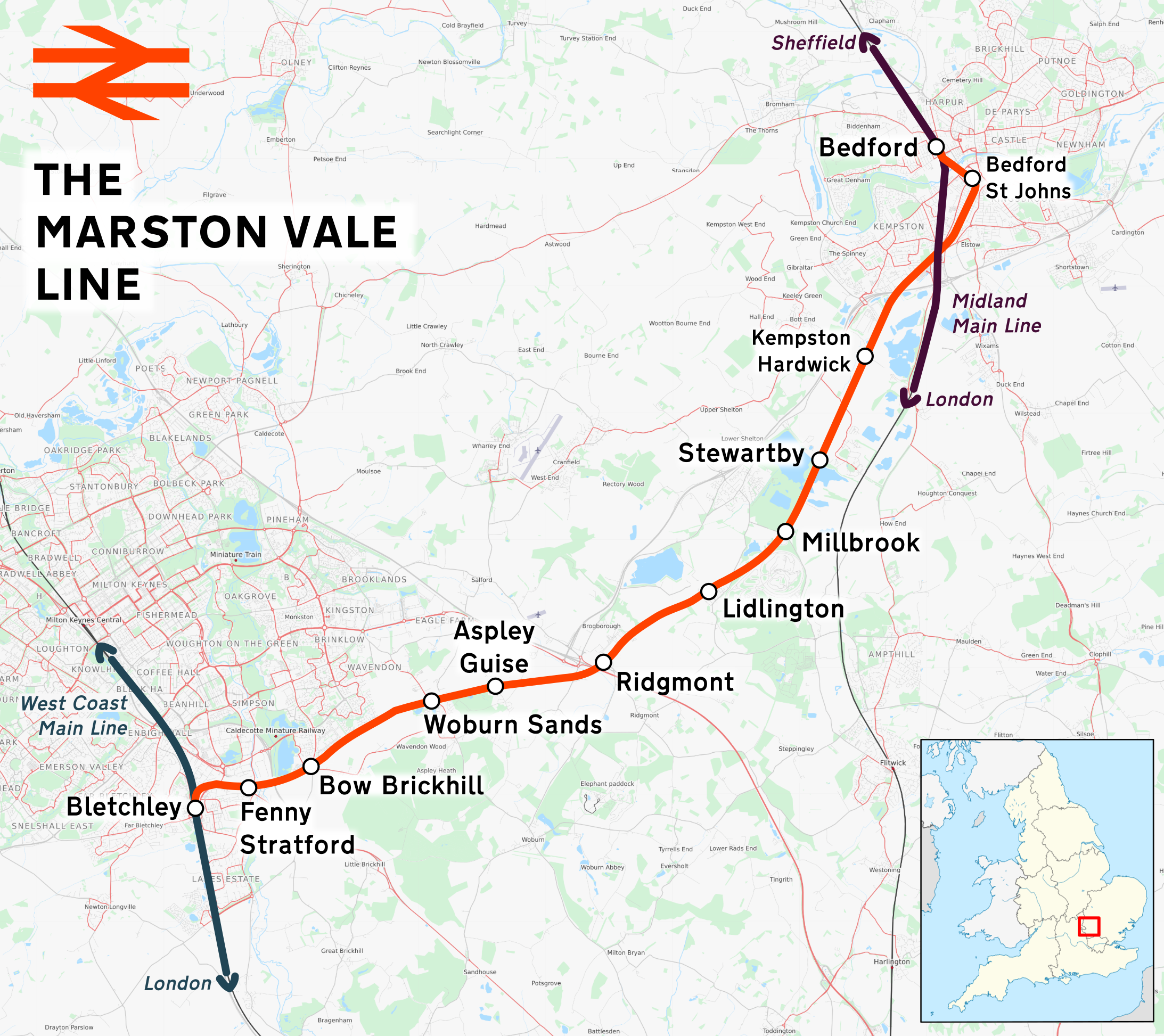
(Click to expand)

The Marston Vale line is a railway route that connects Bedford with Milton Keynes (at Bletchley). It is a surviving remnant of the former Varsity Line between Oxford and Cambridge, most of which was closed in the late 1960s. The line is due to be rebuilt as part of the East West Rail programme, a project underway to re-establish a railway between the university cities.

== History ==
Bedford and London and Birmingham Railway Act 1845
- Act of Parliament
- Parliament of the United Kingdom
- Long title: An Act for making a Railway from the Town of Bedford to join the London and Birmingham Railway near Bletchley in the County of Buckingham.
- Citation: 8 & 9 Vict. c. xliii

Dates
- Royal assent: 30 June 1845

The line was authorised by the Bedford and London and Birmingham Railway Act 1845 (8 & 9 Vict. c. xliii), and opened in 1846 by the London and Birmingham Railway, though the L&B merged with the Grand Junction Railway to become the London and North Western Railway whilst construction was ongoing – the LNWR ran it from its opening. The line later became part of the cross-country Varsity line from Oxford Rewley Road to Cambridge, which opened in stages between 1854 and 1862. Much of the line was built on land owned by the 7th Duke of Bedford, who supported the line but insisted that any station on his estate (Fenny Stratford, Woburn Sands, Ridgmont and Millbrook) be constructed in half-timbered style.

The line was threatened with closure in the late 1950s and again in 1964; though the Bletchley to Oxford and Bedford to Cambridge sections succumbed in December 1967, the Bletchley to Bedford section survived.

In 1977, the Parliamentary Select Committee on Nationalised Industries recommended that electrification of more of Britain's rail network be considered. By 1979, British Rail presented a range of options to do so by 2000, some of which included the Marston Vale line. The proposal was not implemented.

Silverlink operated the line from privatisation in 1996 until 2007. Services were initially in the hands of a mixture of heritage slam-door diesel multiple units formed of two-car Class 117 and single-car Class 121 units, until their replacement with 150/1s trains inherited from Central Trains.

The line was operated by London Midland from 2007 until 2017; it used a mixture of Class 150/1 and Class 153 units, inherited from Silverlink. On 10 December 2017, West Midlands Trains took over the franchise, staff and rolling stock, operating as London Northwestern Railway.

== Operation ==
Passenger services are operated by London Northwestern Railway (LNR). An hourly service operates in each direction from Monday to Saturday.

The line is part of the Network Rail Strategic Route 18, SRS 18.12 and is classified as a rural line. It is one of a number of British railway lines that is covered by a Community Rail Partnership. Like others around the country, the partnership aims to increase use of the line by getting local people involved with their local line; this is achieved through holding community events, running special train services and publicising the line locally.

From December 2018, LNR were to introduce Class 230 D-Trains, built by Vivarail, onto the route replacing the Class 150 Sprinters, but the introduction was delayed until 23 April 2019. In November 2022, Vivarail, the manufacturers and maintainers of the Class 230, entered administration: consequently LNR introduced a rail replacement bus service from December 2022.

In February 2023, it was reported that the operator planned to replace the Class 230 fleet with Class 150 DMUs. LNR told BBC News that "due to the unreliable nature of the Class 230 fleet and the short platforms on the route, there are only a limited number of trains in the country suitable for use [...], which has hampered progress". In February 2023, LNR did not expect to receive the Class 150s until 2024, which is when they were due to be released by Northern Trains; but two of the three units cascaded from Northern entered service on 20 November 2023 for peak time services, with all day services operating from 19 February 2024.

== Infrastructure ==
Apart from a short length of single track at both ends, the line is double tracked and is not electrified. It has a loading gauge of W8 and a line speed of 60 miles per hour (97 km/h). The line's signalling centre is at Ridgmont.

== Proposed developments ==
=== East West Rail ===
The Marston Vale line is one of the two remaining sections of the former Varsity line that were still in passenger use. The programme for East West Rail plans to reinstate the entire Oxford-Cambridge route, which will involve changes to current Marston Vale line stations. (The section between Oxford and Bletchley has already been rebuilt to modern standards.)

=== Extension to Milton Keynes Central ===
In June 2005, the then franchisee, Silverlink Trains, announced an intention to extend the Marston Vale service via the West Coast Main Line to Milton Keynes Central, where a new platform and track would be built alongside the up slow track. Work began on 4 December 2006 at the station to prepare for a service connection.

The platform was ready for use in January 2009 but the service did not materialise and there are no longer any published plans for it to do so. A firm service pattern on East West Rail remains to be announced, but the illustrative pattern has no Bedford - Milton Keynes Central service; passengers will continue to have to change at Bletchley. There is no east-to-north chord between this line and the WCML; as of December 2020, the route the chord might take is occupied by trade outlets and a warehouse. (Note: on Third Avenue and James Way, Denbigh West (52.0009,-0.7343))

== See also ==
- Marston Vale
