= Marston Vale =

Area of Bedfordshire, England

Coordinates: 52.062°N 0.538°W

- Area
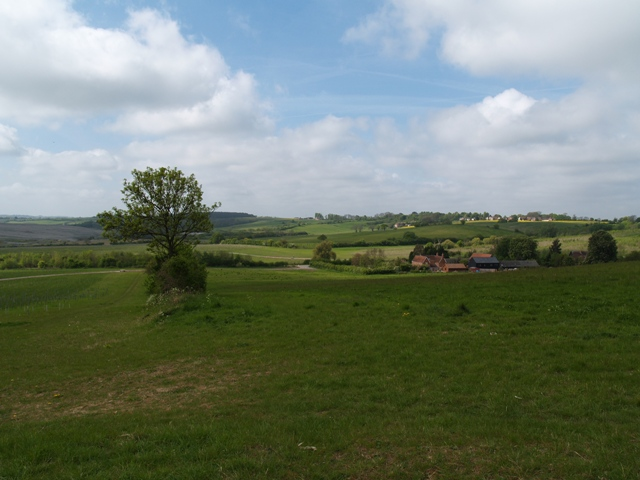
- View over Marston Vale, 2009

- Location within the United Kingdom
- Country: England
- Sovereign state: United Kingdom
- Villages: Stewartby, Kempston Hardwick, Houghton Conquest, Marston Moretaine, Lidlington, Brogborough, Ridgmont, Wootton, Wixams
- Website: www.marstonvale.org//

Marston Vale is an area of Bedfordshire. It lies to the south west of Bedford and Kempston, near Junction 13 of the M1 motorway. Historically it was one of the main brickmaking districts in England, home of the London Brick Company, now a division of Hanson plc. The brickmaking activity left scars across the landscape of the Marston Vale as large tracts of land were dug for clay. Most of the claypits are now exhausted, and most of the brickmaking chimneys have been demolished. The legacy of the abandoned brickworks also adds to the impression that the Marston Vale has been despoiled by decades of industrial activity and it is now searching for a new identity. In more recent years the local authorities have used the clay pits for landfills at Stewartby and Brogborough, both of which are recently capped and closed down.

== Forest of Marston Vale ==
The aesthetic and environmental condition of the Vale is being restored by a community forest project called the Forest of Marston Vale.

== Settlements ==
Villages in Marston Vale include Stewartby, Kempston Hardwick, Houghton Conquest, Marston Moretaine, Lidlington, Brogborough, Ridgmont and Wootton. In 2007 construction work began on the new town of Wixams.

Wootton Pillinge was renamed Stewartby in 1937 in recognition of the Stewart family who had been instrumental in developing the brickworks.

== Brick making ==
At the height of the industry’s production there were 162 brick chimneys in Marston Vale.

In the 1970s Bedfordshire produced 20% of England’s bricks. Prior to closure, production totalled 135 million bricks a year. In Feb 2008, Hanson closed brickmaking operations at Stewartby owing to problems meeting UK sulphur emission regulations, even though it met the EU regulations. In 2008, the 2 surviving Hoffman kilns (CK1 and CK3) and 4 chimneys at the brickworks were given Grade II listed status.

The factories used Oxford Clay, which is made up of 5% seaweed, formed 150 million years ago when it was on the sea bed. This reduced the amount of coal needed to fire the kilns, as the organic material burned.

== Transport ==
Rail transport in the district is served by the Marston Vale Line.

The primary road through the area is the A421.
