= Willington railway station (Bedfordshire) =

Former railway station in Bedfordshire, England

Coordinates: 52.1393°N 0.3758°W

Willington

General information
- Location: Willington, Borough of Bedford; England
- Grid reference: TL113503
- Platforms: 2

Other information
- Status: Disused

History
- Original company: London and North Western Railway
- Post-grouping: London, Midland and Scottish Railway; London Midland Region of British Railways (1948–1958); Eastern Region of British Railways (1958–1968)

Key dates
- 1 May 1903: Opened
- 13 July 1964: Closed to goods
- 1 January 1968: Closed to passengers
Location

Willington was a railway station on the Varsity Line which served the small village of the same name in Bedfordshire. Opened in 1903, the station was located in a rural area and saw little passenger traffic; it closed together with the line in 1968.

== History ==
Willington station only opened in 1903, some forty years after the Varsity Line had first opened, as a result of pressure by local villagers on the London and North Western Railway (LNWR). Prior to the station's opening, there had been a siding on the site from September 1896 to handle local vegetable traffic, together with a weighing machine. The station opened at a time when the railway company was looking to increase revenues on the line and was followed by the opening of five halts in 1905 at Wootton Broadmead, Kempston Hardwick, Kempston, Aspley Guise, Bow Brickhill and Husborne Crawley.

The initial station was a very basic single platform structure with wooden weatherboarded outbuildings typical of the LNWR's construction techniques. A second timber platform was added in August 1912 when an unusually long passing loop was laid through the station. A short 16-lever type 5 LNWR signal box was sited on the down platform adjacent to a wooden passenger shelter. At first, trains did not stop at the station unless passengers wishing to join had announced their intention to station staff who would stop the train by signal; passengers wishing to alight had to give notice at the preceding station. The long passing loop was made yet longer on 3 August 1916 to facilitate the increased wartime traffic on the line.

Dwindling goods traffic coupled with the fact that the station served a relatively rural community - there were 204 residents in 1901, rising to 475 in 1961 - plus its slightly inconvenient siting to the north of Willington village, left the station susceptible to competition from the motor car. The station eventually closed together with the Bedford & Cambridge-built section of the Varsity Line in 1968.

Preceding station	Disused railways	Following station
Bedford St Johns	British Railways; Varsity Line	Blunham

== Present day ==
=== Station site ===
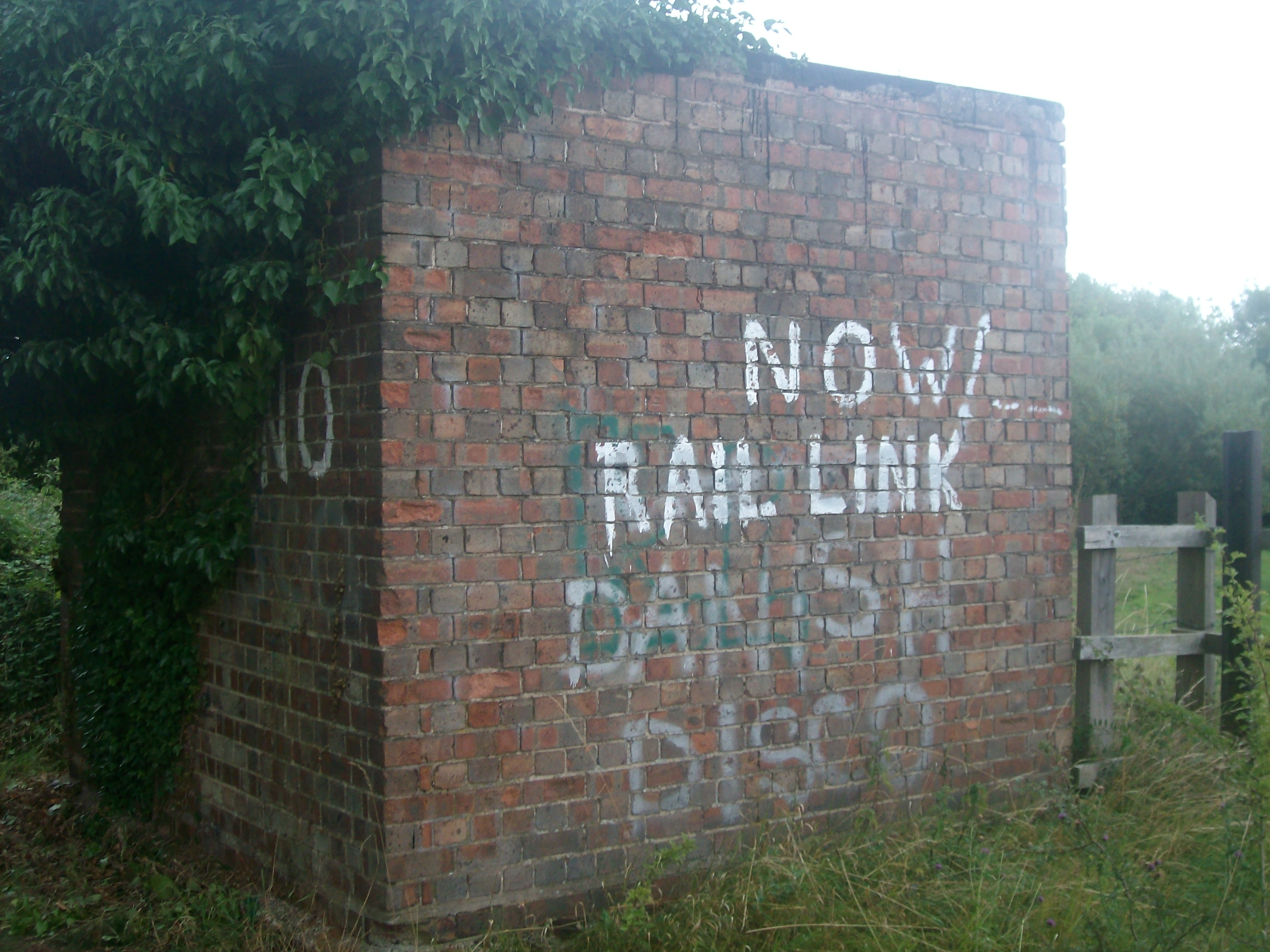
Graffiti on a derelict building near the site of the former station

The wooden station buildings were derelict by 1971 and had been cleared away by 1975, leaving the remains of the original brick-built platform. The trackbed through the station has been preserved as part of National Cycle Route 51.

=== Bedford Rowing Lake ===
In July 2006, Bedfordshire County Council approved the construction of the Bedford Rowing Lake for the purposes of the 2012 Olympic Games, a 2,300m lake which was proposed to straddle the railway trackbed, taking a 120-metre section out of the route and making any reinstatement as had been proposed by the East West Rail Consortium far more expensive. The Labour government was criticised for its lack of support for the East West Rail Project and failure to safeguard the trackbed. As of late 2021, the lake project has not gone ahead, but reinstatement of this part of the alignment is not under consideration by the East-West Rail project (which is instead proposing brand new alignments further north).
