= Lidlington =

Village in Bedfordshire, England

Coordinates: 52.04059°N 0.55948°W

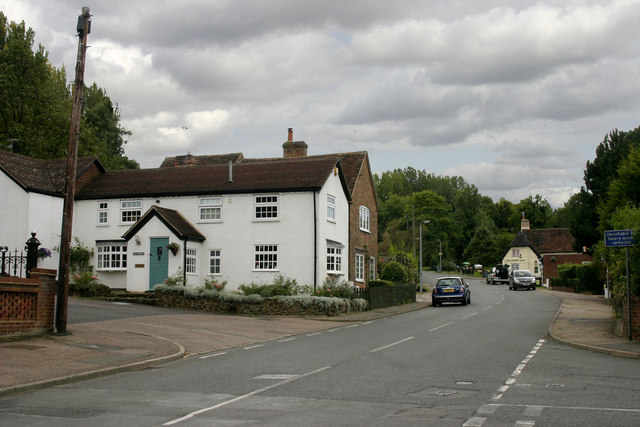
- Lidlington High Street

- Location within Bedfordshire
- Interactive map of Lidlington
- Population: 1,347 (2011 Census)
- OS grid reference: SP989390
- Civil parish: Lidlington
- Unitary authority: Central Bedfordshire
- Ceremonial county: Bedfordshire
- Region: East
- Country: England
- Sovereign state: United Kingdom
- Post town: Bedford
- Postcode district: MK43
- Dialling code: 01525
- Police: Bedfordshire
- Fire: Bedfordshire
- Ambulance: East of England

Lidlington is a small village and civil parish in Central Bedfordshire, England surrounded by farmland, in the Marston Vale. The hamlets of Boughton End and Thrupp End are also part of the parish.

The village has an unusual Gothic-style church built by the Duke of Bedford in 1845 and a thatched pub on its High Street. Lidlington is set on the Southern part of the vale's 'basin'. The village has a lower school for 5–9 year olds named after Thomas Johnson, a Dick Whittington-type character who was Lord Mayor of London in 1840–41.

Brogborough Lake (also known as Lidlington Lake) at the edge of the village is popular for birdwatching and fishing. The lake is also used for windsurfing and stand up paddle surfing. The nearby landfill site (which was known as Brogborough Landfill site) was the largest landfill in Europe before closing to new deposits in 2009. With a population of about 1300 voters and over 500 homes, Lidlington is defined as a small village. It has a village hall, a pub, a hairdresser and a general store, plus a "farm store" on the A421. Lidlington has retained a daily doorstop milk and newspaper delivery service, but has lost its village post office. The village also has a single congregation Anglican/Baptist/Methodist church, members of which worship regularly in the chapel.

The village lies between the main A421 Bedford to Milton Keynes road and the A507 Ampthill to Woburn road. Lidlington railway station is on the Marston Vale Line which gives good access for walkers along the Greensand Ridge long-distance footpath which passes nearby the village. Local speculation is that the ridge was the model for the "Delectable Mountains" in John Bunyan's Pilgrim's Progress. Lidlington Hill may also be Bunyan's "Hill of Difficulty".

Lidlington is adjacent to the site of the Millbrook Proving Ground (formerly the Vauxhall test track), which is distinguishable from the air by its large circular track. To the north of the Parish of Lidlington is Cranfield Airport, used by small aircraft and for training flights.

To the west of the village at the former brick works is a business park which is home to Amazon.com UK. The former brickworks to the east of the village are known as Lidlington Pit and forms part of the regeneration of the Forest of Marston Vale area.

Like many other villages in the area it was formerly part of the Duke of Bedford's estate. Hence some London place names e.g. Bedford Square, Russell Square, Eversholt Street, Woburn Place and in Camden, NW1, Lidlington Place can be found near Mornington Crescent underground station.

Lidlington United currently play in the Bedfordshire Football League Premier Division after being promoted in three successive seasons. The village also has a cricket team, and all-weather tennis courts at the recreation ground.

Lidlington is mentioned in the Domesday Book. The entry reads Litinclitone: Abbess of Barking.

In April 2008 the area was listed as a site for the Government's 'ECO-town' competition.

In July 2008 the brownfield locations for the 'ECO-town' were dropped in favour of using the prime farmland surrounding Lidlington.

Early in 2009 the developers' plans for an 'ECO-town' were dropped.

In August 2025 the Lidlington Run Club was launched. All abilities welcome and meet every Monday at 6.30pm for a weekly 5k run.

== See also ==
- The London Brick Company
