= Stewartby railway station =

Railway station in Bedfordshire, England

Stewartby
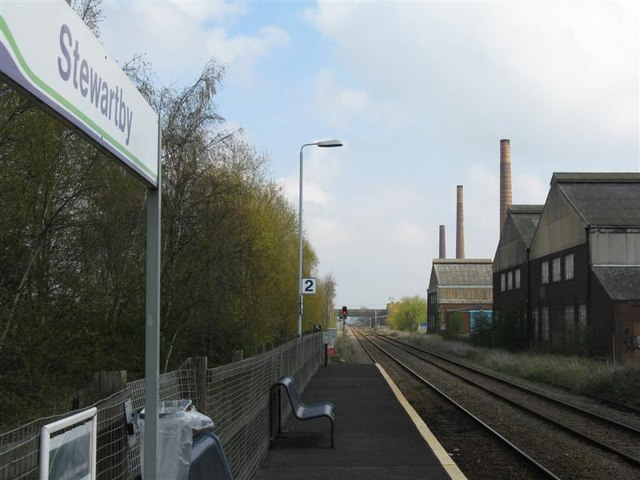
- Looking north-east with three of the four surviving and listed brickworks chimneys in view

General information
- Location: Stewartby, Bedford; England
- Coordinates: 52.069°N 0.521°W
- Grid reference: TL014422
- Manager: London Northwestern Railway
- Platforms: 2

Other information
- Station code: SWR
- Classification: DfT category F2

Key dates
- 1905: Opened as Wootton Pillinge Halt
- 1 January 1917: Temporarily closed
- 5 May 1919: Reopened
- 1 January 1928: Renamed Wootton Pillinge
- 8 July 1935: Renamed Stewartby
- 15 July 1968: Became unstaffed

Passengers
- 2020/21: ▼45,770
- 2021/22: ▲76,872
- 2022/23: ▼72,444
- 2023/24: ▼47,456
- 2024/25: ▲84,976
Location
Notes
- Passenger statistics from the Office of Rail and Road

Stewartby railway station is a station on the Marston Vale line, which serves the Bedfordshire village of Stewartby in England. It is the nearest station to the Marston Vale Millennium Country Park.

== History ==
When first opened in 1905 by the London and North Western Railway, the station was a halt serving the small village of Wootton Pillinge, a largely rural community that, in 1897, had become the site of B.J.H. Forder's brickworks. The plant was served by sidings close to and alongside the halt which were controlled by a signal box; the halt was simply constructed with a platform at ground level constructed out of sleepers. By 1910, the Wootton Pillinge Brick Company was selling 48 million bricks per year and in 1923, it merged with the London Brick Company (LBC). The brickworks developed virtually across the railway line and as the wagon capacity of the old sidings was exceeded, they became an extension for a larger group of sidings developing at Wootton Broadmead. The Wootton Pillinge signal box was closed and a new box was opened called "Forder's Sidings" which controlled heavy movements from the works.

In 1926 the LBC began to build a "garden village" for its employees at Wootton Pillinge; the village was to be named "Stewartby" after Sir Halley Stewart, the former Liberal Parliamentary candidate for Peterborough and first chairman of the Wootton Pillinge Brick Company. Following the building of the village, the London, Midland and Scottish Railway renamed the station (which ceased to be a halt in 1928) to Stewartby. The Stewartby brickworks was connected to the Marston Vale Line via a 2 ft 11 in (889 mm) narrow gauge railway operating on overhead electrification. This is believed to have been installed in the 1930s and lasted until 1960. After reaching a peak production level of 738 million bricks in 1973, demand for bricks declined and the LBC (trading as Easidispose) signed an agreement the following year to re-use its empty clay pits as landfill transported from London. One or two daily container trains began transporting 1,000 tons of waste from Hendon to handling facilities at Stewartby.

Preceding station	Disused railways	Following station
Millbrook	British Railways; Varsity Line	Wootton Broadmead Halt

== Services ==
All services at Stewartby are operated by London Northwestern Railway.

The typical off-peak service is one train per hour in each direction between Bletchley and Bedford which runs on weekdays and Saturdays only using Class 150 DMUs. There is no Sunday service.

Preceding station	National Rail	Following station
Millbrook (Bedfordshire) towards Bletchley	London Northwestern Railway Marston Vale Line Monday–Saturday only	Kempston Hardwick towards Bedford
Planned future service
Ridgmont	East West Rail Oxford to Cambridge	Bedford St Johns

== Future proposals ==
The station is planned to be relocated approximately 1 mile to the northeast, as part of the East West Rail programme, in order to better serve the Universal United Kingdom Resort. The station could see four trains per hour in each direction, with four platforms, allowing trains to terminate and start from the station.

== Sources ==
- Simpson, Bill (1981). Oxford to Cambridge Railway. Vol. 2. Poole: Oxford Publishing Co. ISBN 0-86093-121-8.
- Simpson, Bill (2000). The Oxford to Cambridge Railway: Forty Years On 1960-2000. Witney: Lamplight Publications. ISBN 1-899246-05-3.
