= Wootton Broadmead Halt railway station =

Former railway station in Bedfordshire, England

Coordinates: 52.0808°N 0.5122°W

Wootton Broadmead Halt
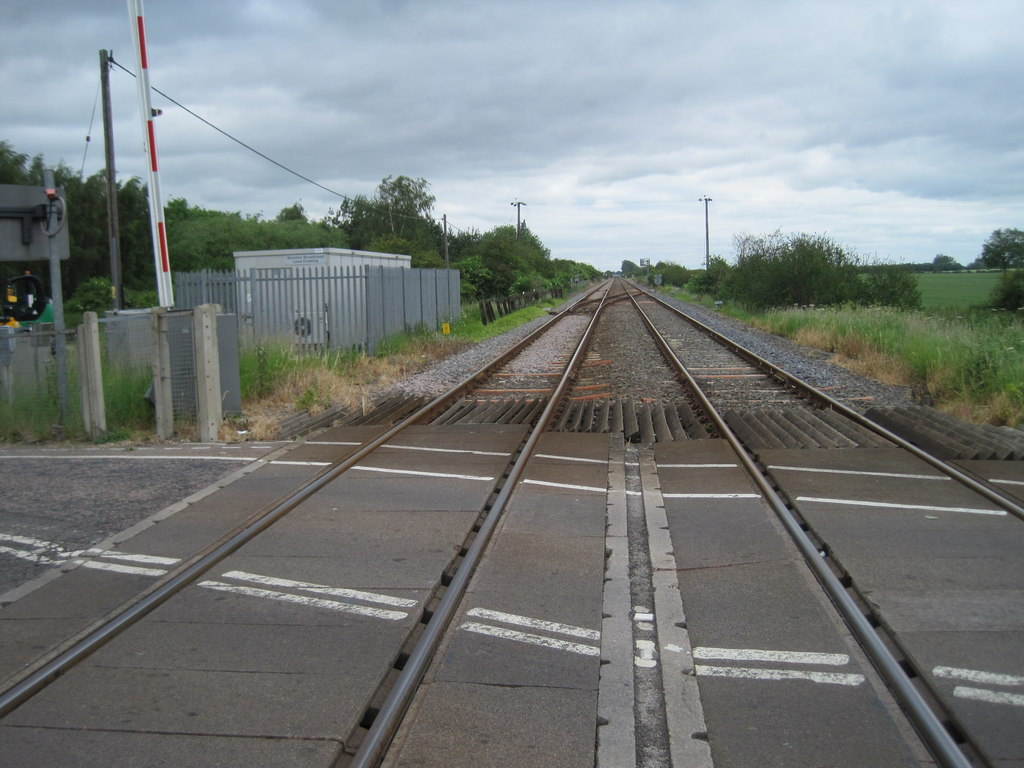
- The site of the station in 2012

General information
- Location: Stewartby, Bedford; England
- Grid reference: TL020436
- Platforms: 2

Other information
- Status: Disused

History
- Original company: London and North Western Railway
- Post-grouping: London, Midland and Scottish Railway

Key dates
- 1905: Opened
- 1 January 1917: Temporary closure
- 5 May 1919: Reopened
- 5 May 1941: Temporary closure
- After June 1952: Official closure
Location

Wootton Broadmead Halt was a railway station on the Varsity Line which served the settlement of Wootton Broadmead near Stewartby in Bedfordshire, England. Opened in 1905, it was closed temporarily during both world wars and did not reopen after 1941, officially closing in 1952.

== History ==
Wootton Broadmead was one of three halts opened by the London and North Western Railway in 1905 between Stewartby and Bedford. Their opening coincided with the introduction of a steam railmotor on the Varsity Line, and each was sited alongside a level crossing. All three halts were opened at the same time and were all closed during the First World War as an economy measure. Wootton Broadmead and Kempston & Elstow Halt were also suspended from service during the Second World War for the same reason, never to reopen. Wootton Broadmead lingered without use until it was officially closed in 1952.

Unlike other halts to the south and north, Wootton Broadmead was not conveniently situated near any local community, although there was a brickworks in the vicinity. It was located at the north end of Forder's Sidings on the line's 12 milepost.

Preceding station	Disused railways	Following station
Stewartby	British Railways; Varsity Line	Kempston Hardwick

== Present day ==
Nothing remains of the halt.
