= Millbrook railway station (Bedfordshire) =

Railway station in Millbrook, Bedfordshire, England

Millbrook
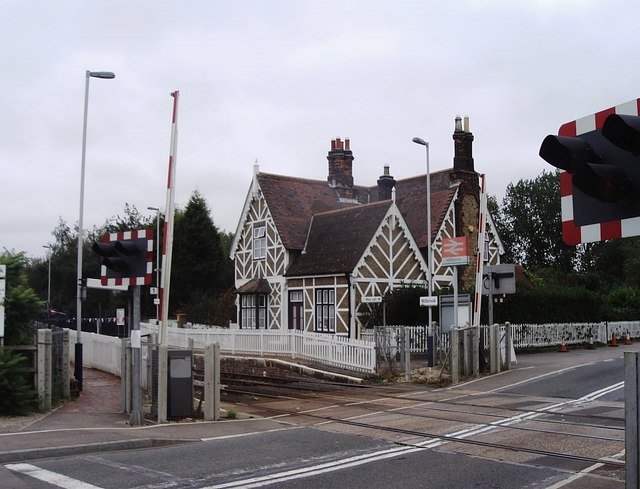

General information
- Location: Millbrook, Central Bedfordshire; England
- Coordinates: 52.0538°N 0.5338°W
- Grid reference: TL007405
- Manager: London Northwestern Railway
- Platforms: 2

Other information
- Station code: MLB
- Classification: DfT category F2

Key dates
- 17 November 1846: Opened as Marston
- March 1847: Renamed Ampthill
- January 1850: Renamed Ampthill (Marston)
- March 1877: Renamed Millbrook for Ampthill
- 1 July 1910: Renamed Millbrook
- 3 August 1964: Goods services withdrawn
- 15 July 1968: Became unstaffed

Passengers
- 2021/22: ▲3,618
- 2022/23: ▲6,566
- 2023/24: ▼2,312
- 2024/25: ▲9,282
- 2025/26: ▲12,014
Location
Notes
- Passenger statistics from the Office of Rail and Road

Millbrook railway station serves the villages of Millbrook and Marston Moretaine in Bedfordshire, England. It is on the Marston Vale Line, between Stewartby and Lidlington. Millbrook is also the principal stop for the Marston Vale Millennium Country Park.

It was the least used station in Bedfordshire during the 2020/21 period.

== History ==
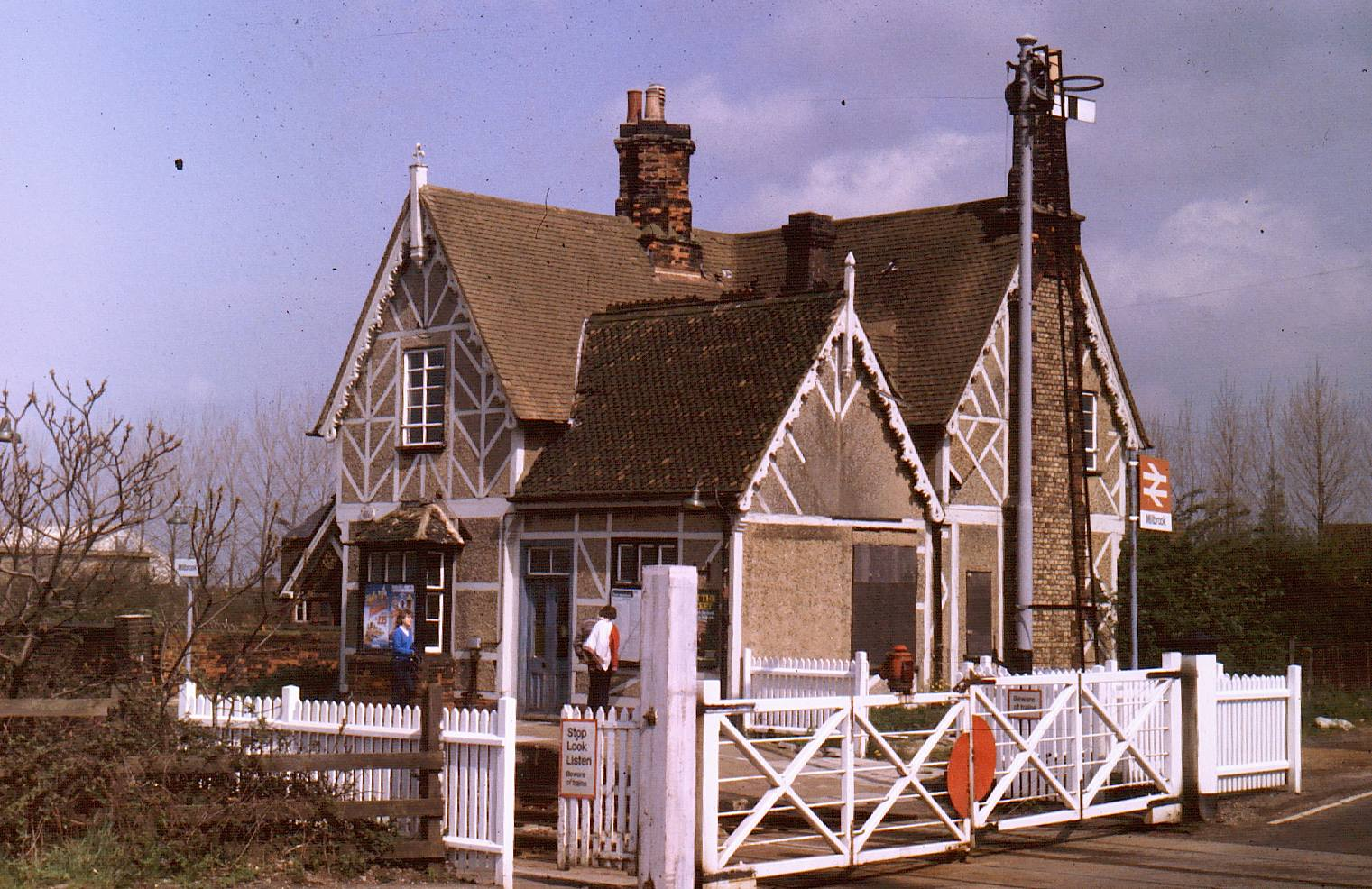
Millbrook station, January 1985

First opened in 1846 by the Bedford Railway, the station was originally named "Marston", but changed to "Ampthill (Marston)" in 1850 after the nearby village. The opening of a second and more conveniently sited Ampthill station by the Midland Railway in 1868 on its Midland Main Line gave rise to confusion which was only resolved in 1877 when the original Ampthill station was renamed "Millbrook for Ampthill". The station is the fourth and final on the Marston Vale Line to be built in a half-timbered Gothic Revival style that had been insisted upon by the 7th Duke of Bedford for stations situated in the vicinity of the Woburn Estate. The two station platforms are east of a level crossing.

The station developed substantial coal traffic, as well as trade in cattle and goods with stables in its goods yard and a wagon repairers. A public house called the Morteyne Arms opened opposite the station. Traffic increased still further with the development of the brick industry in the area; a siding was opened on 7 May 1928 to cater for the trade in bricks, the towers of the Millbrook Brick Company could be seen from the station. The brick traffic peaked in the 1930s, with a second brickworks called "Marston Moretaine" being opened a mile from the station; although it was too far for a siding, bricks were transported by road to the station where they were loaded on to rail wagons.

The station, whose name was changed to "Millbrook" in 1910, was reduced to an unstaffed halt in 1968, having lost its formerly substantial goods facilities four years previously. The station building was restored in the early 1980s and converted into a private residence. In 1999, the low station platforms – the last of their type remaining on the line – were rebuilt to the standard height appropriate to modern trains.

In 2021, a bench in memory of Captain Tom Moore was unveiled on the station platform.

== Services ==
All services at Millbrook are operated by London Northwestern Railway.

The typical off-peak service is one train per hour in each direction between Bletchley and Bedford which runs on weekdays and Saturdays only using Class 150 DMUs. There is no Sunday service.

Preceding station	National Rail	Following station
Lidlington towards Bletchley	London Northwestern Railway Marston Vale Line Monday–Saturday only	Stewartby towards Bedford

== Sources ==
- Simpson, Bill (1981). Oxford to Cambridge Railway. Vol. 2. Poole: Oxford Publishing Co. ISBN 0-86093-121-8.
