= Bambarabedda =

Coordinates: 7°15′N 80°51′E

- Village
- Interactive map of Bambarabedda
- Country: Sri Lanka
- Province: Central Province
- Time zone: UTC+5:30 (Sri Lanka Standard Time)

Bambarabedda is a village in Sri Lanka. It is located within Central Province in the Kandy District. The village is located on the Ma-Oya River.

Villagers in Bambarabedda participate in Sri Lanka's forestry program. The program supports the livelihoods of the forest adjacent communities and aims to contribute to poverty reduction in nearby areas while reducing forest degradation. In the late 80s to early 90s, participants in the program prioritized growing trees that could improve food production, like jack trees (Artocarpus heterophyllus) and cocunut trees (Cocus nucifera). In 2016, approximately 450 people lived in the community forestry site.

== See also ==
- List of towns in Central Province, Sri Lanka
