= Kempston Hardwick railway station =

Railway station in Bedfordshire, England

Kempston Hardwick
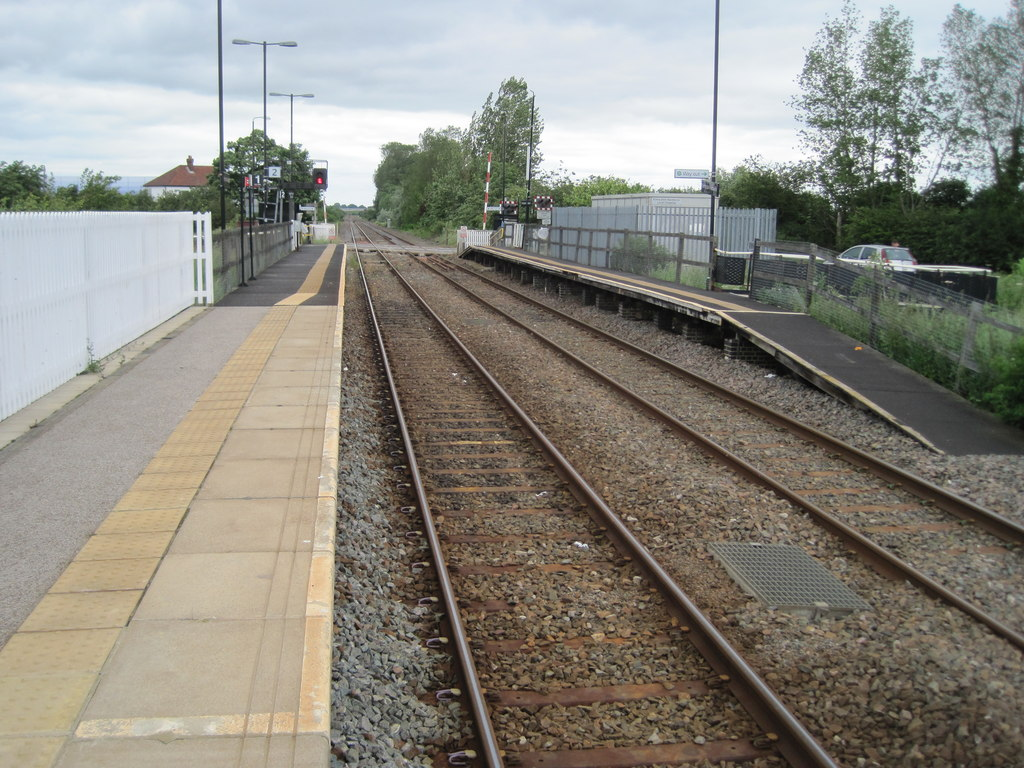
- Station in 2012

General information
- Location: Kempston Hardwick, Bedford; England
- Coordinates: 52.092°N 0.504°W
- Grid reference: TL025447
- Manager: London Northwestern Railway
- Platforms: 2

Other information
- Station code: KMH
- Classification: DfT category F2

Key dates
- 1905: Opened as Kempston Hardwick Halt
- 1 January 1917: Temporarily closed
- 5 May 1919: Reopened
- 15 July 1968: Became unstaffed

Passengers
- 2021/22: ▲3,154
- 2022/23: ▲4,458
- 2023/24: ▼2,296
- 2024/25: ▲9,782
- 2025/26: ▲12,850
Location
Notes
- Passenger statistics from the Office of Rail and Road

Kempston Hardwick railway station serves the village of Kempston Hardwick in Bedfordshire, England. The station, on the Marston Vale line (and, prospectively, East West Rail), has two platforms next to a half-barrier level crossing.

As of 2024, Kempston Hardwick is the least used station in Bedfordshire. However, in 2023 Universal Studios announced that it had bought land beside the station, where it plans to build its first UK theme park. On 9 April 2025, the Government announced that it had approved the plan and, subject to detailed planning approvals, construction is expected to start in 2026. The project plans to transform the area, with a completely rebuilt railway station to replace the current one (as well as a new Wixams railway station on the Midland Main Line, on the other side of the site).

== History ==
The level crossing at Kempston Hardwick was opened in 1846 with the construction of the Bedford Railway Company railway line between Bedford (St Johns railway station) and Bletchley.

An agreement with the London and Birmingham Railway was made whereby the railway was to be constructed and operated by the London & Birmingham Railway company, who under the terms of the Bedford and London and Birmingham Railway Act 1845 (8 & 9 Vict. c. xliii) split the profits from the operation of the line. During the construction of the line however the London and Birmingham Railway merged with the Grand Junction Railway to form the London and North Western Railway company.

Kempston Hardwick was one of three halts opened by the London and North Western Railway in 1905 between Stewartby and Bedford. Their opening coincided with the introduction of a steam railmotor on the Varsity Line; the station platform initially consisted of wooden sleepers laid at ground level for a carriage length. All three closed as a wartime economy measure during the First World War and two were closed during Second World War, never to reopen, leaving Kempston Hardwick as the only survivor. Its survival can be attributed to its convenient location for the nearby Eastwood's Brickworks which was served from 1928 by a private siding on the up side of the line.

The level crossing alongside the station was once controlled by a crossing keeper who lived in a lodge adjacent to his place of work. This was demolished in the 1980s.

In 2003, it was reported that Kempston Hardwick was one of the quietest stations in England as only 38 passengers per month were reported to be using it. Two reasons offered for the lack of custom were the absence of signage indicating the station from the main road, and the lack of parking facilities. Following the release of this story, Silverlink together with Bedfordshire County Council confirmed that they would not be seeking the closure of the station. Station patronage has, however, now increased, according to the Community Rail Partnership which attributes the rise to the creation of significant numbers of jobs in the area. In 2008, it was announced that the area around the railway station could be the location of a new eco-town.

The station is near Wootton, a larger village of about 4,000 people, but there is no direct route between the places. The circuitous road route is about a 40 minutes walk (the station does not have car parking facilities).

== Services ==
All services at Kempston Hardwick are operated by London Northwestern Railway.

The typical off-peak service is one train per hour in each direction between Bletchley and Bedford which runs on weekdays and Saturdays only using Class 150 DMUs. There is no Sunday service.

Preceding station	National Rail	Following station
Stewartby towards Bletchley	London Northwestern Railway Marston Vale Line Monday–Saturday only	Bedford St Johns towards Bedford

Preceding station	Disused railways	Following station
Wootton Broadmead Halt	British Railways; Varsity Line	Kempston and Elstow Halt

== Community Rail Partnership ==
Kempston Hardwick station, in common with others on the Marston Vale Line, is covered by the Marston Vale Community Rail Partnership, which aims to increase use of the line by involving local people.
