= Elizabeth Snowe =

Elizabeth Snowe (died 1587) was a gentlewoman in the Privy Chamber of Elizabeth I where she was known as Mistress Snowe and was involved in gift giving at court.

== Family background ==
She was a member of the Cavendish family, a daughter of an aunt of Mary Talbot, Countess of Shrewsbury. She married Richard Snowe (died 1554) of Chicksands in Bedfordshire. He was deputy clerk of the Hanaper. Henry VIII granted them Chicksands Priory, which was converted into a house. Their children included Daniel, Edward, Rebecca, and Sara. After the death of Richard Snowe, the property at Chicksands was sold by Daniel Snowe to Peter Osborne.

== At court ==
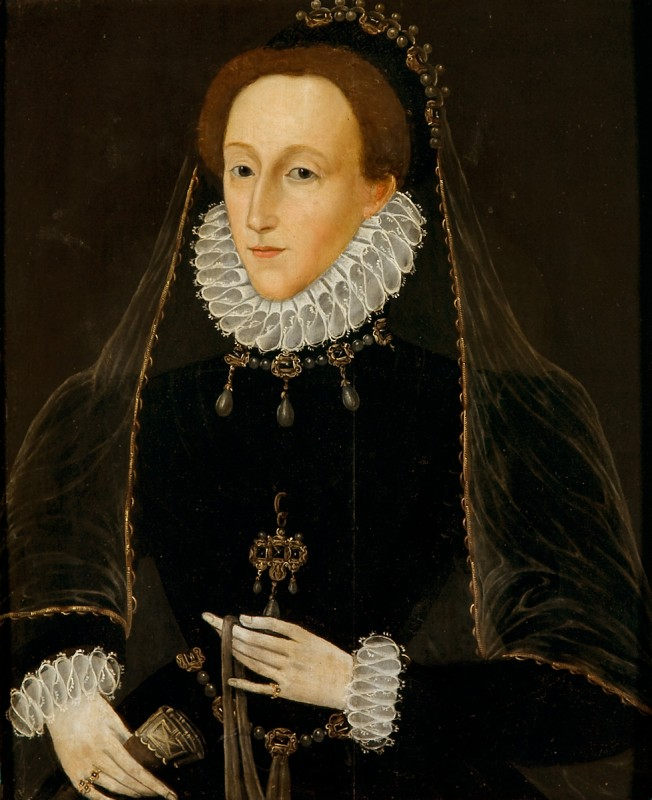
Elizabeth Snowe was a gentlewoman to Elizabeth I

Elizabeth I gave Elizabeth Snowe the manor of Kempston Hardwick in March 1560.

In 1574 and 1577, as New Year's Day gifts, Elizabeth Snowe gave sets of small gold toothpicks with embroidered tooth-cloths to Queen Elizabeth. The gold toothpicks were entered in Elizabeth's inventory of jewels and plate. The cloths, used to wipe teeth, were worked with black silk and gold thread. Elizabeth lost one of the six toothpicks given in 1574. In October 1600 the toothpicks were sent to the Royal Mint to be melted down.

Other courtiers presented toothpicks to the queen and her laundress Mrs Anne Twist gave blackwork toothcloths. In return, courtiers were given silver plate. Snowe received items made by Hugh Kayle and a silver tankard made by Robert Brandon. The weight of these items was recorded on the gift roll. In her will, Snowe mentioned that Elizabeth had given her gilt cups as New Year's Day gifts.

Queen Elizabeth gave twelve yards of russet satin to be a gown for her daughter Sara on 21 October 1566, with two yards black velvet to make borders and edging called "guards". She signed a wardrobe record known as the day book, "Elyzabeth Snowe".

The Queen gave material for a gown of black damask guarded with black velvet to Mrs Snowe's daughter-in-law Eme Snowe, the wife of Edward Snowe, on 24 May 1580. This was a wedding gift, Eme, a daughter of William Byne of Wakehurst and Rowdell, Washington, had married Edward a week earlier. She signed "Eme Snowe". After Edward's death, Eme married John Bowyer of Camberwell in July 1588. Eme's older sister Katherine had married his brother Edmund Bowyer in May 1573.

A letter written by Bess of Hardwick to her daughter Mary Cavendish, later Countess of Shrewsbury, written around the year 1580, mentions that "my systar Snowe" had left the court and gone to live in the country after "some device" had been used against her. Bess of Hardwick's information came from Nan Baynton nee Cavendish, the wife of Henry Baynton.

== Death ==
Elizabeth Snowe died in 1587. She bequeathed to Henry Grey, 6th Earl of Kent "one of the best gilte cuppes" that had been a New Year's Day gift from the queen. Her daughter Rebecca (died 1601) and son-in-law William Geery (died 1593) disputed her property with Edward Snowe who died later in 1587.

Her grandson Richard Gery of Bushmead and Little Staughton, (died 1638), was a gentleman of the Privy Chamber to James VI and I and Charles I of England.
