= Wixams railway station =

Future railway station in Bedfordshire, England

Wixams

General information
- Location: Wixams, Bedford; England
- Coordinates: 52.0871°N 0.4867°W
- Grid reference: TL037443
Location

Wixams railway station is a proposed railway station on the Midland Main Line to serve Wixams, a new town development in Bedfordshire, England. The station will be situated between Bedford and Flitwick.

The station was due to be completed in 2015, but Network Rail withdrew their promise of funding. In 2017, Gallagher Estates applied for funding from the government for the station.

In July 2017, it was reported the site would be located further north as part of the East West Rail project.

In January 2019, East West Railway Company revealed five options for a potential Bedford-Cambridge route, with three of the options proposing a new station at Bedford South close to Wixams. However in January 2020, the preferred route was announced which does not include a Bedford South station.

In January 2022, Bedford Borough Council announced that it has chosen a preferred design for the new station with completion of the station slated for 2024.

By August 2024, preparation work for the site had started, with works officially starting in December. The station was intended to have up to 350 parking spaces with two platforms, and was set to open in late 2026.

The station is close to the planned Universal United Kingdom theme park. The station is expected to be significantly expanded in size, to four platforms, if the park is built as planned. On 9 April 2025, the Government announced that it had approved the plan and, subject to detailed planning approvals, construction is expected to start in 2026. At the end of July 2025 work on the station was put on hold due to the pending public consultation on the theme park. Conservative Mayor of Bedford Tom Wootton rubber stamped the decision to terminate the existing agreement with Network Rail.

Preceding station	National Rail	Following station
	Proposed future services	
Flitwick	Thameslink Midland Main Line	Bedford
Luton	East Midlands Railway Midland Main Line	Bedford
