= Kempston Hardwick =

Hamlet in Bedfordshire, England

Coordinates: 52.0883°N 0.4958°W

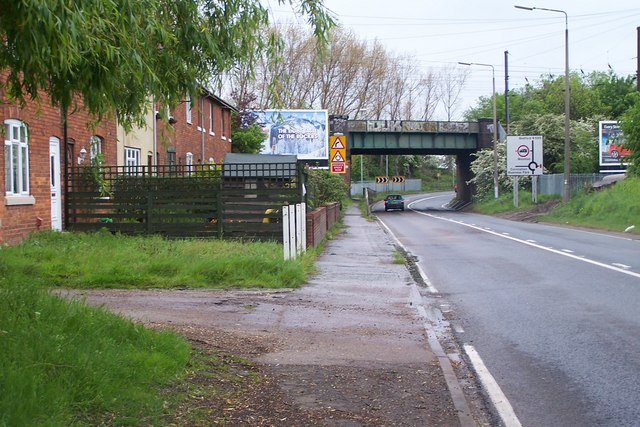
- Railway bridge and cottages at the south-east end of the village

- Location within Bedfordshire
- OS grid reference: TL030484
- Civil parish: Stewartby
- Unitary authority: Bedford
- Ceremonial county: Bedfordshire
- Region: East
- Country: England
- Sovereign state: United Kingdom
- Post town: BEDFORD
- Postcode district: MK43
- Dialling code: 01234
- Police: Bedfordshire
- Fire: Bedfordshire
- Ambulance: East of England
- UK Parliament: Bedford

Kempston Hardwick is a small hamlet on the edge of the town of Kempston in Bedfordshire, England. Historically it was one of the hamlets or "ends" scattered across the parish of Kempston. It is served by Kempston Hardwick railway station on the Marston Vale line, which was one of the least-used stations in the UK railway network.

== History ==
Hardwick Preceptory was a priory of the Knights Hospitaller from 1279 to 1489. The first mention of this property occurs in 1279. In 1287, and 1330, the Prior claimed to hold a view of frankpledge from four tenants in Kempston. In 1338, this estate comprised a messuage with a garden worth 4s. per annum, a dovehouse valued at 3s. 4d., a water-mill 26s. 8d., 370 acres of land worth £6 3s. 4d., 32 acres meadow worth 44s., 8 acres of pasture worth 8s., and pasture for 200 oxen worth 20s. After the Dissolution, the property, called the manor of Hardwick, was bestowed upon Sir Richard Longe in 1540.

Elizabeth I gave the manor and mansion of Kempston Hardwick to her gentlewoman Elizabeth Snowe in March 1560.

Kempston Hardwick was part of the ancient parish of Kempston. In 1894 the parish became part of Bedford Rural District. In 1896 the parish was divided, with the town of Kempston forming Kempston Urban District and the rest of the parish becoming a new parish called Kempston Rural. In 1937 a new parish of Stewartby was created that included Kempston Hardwick.

Kempston Hardwick is the confirmed location for the planned Universal Studios Great Britain.

== See also ==
- Kempston Hardwick railway station
- Kempston and Elstow Halt railway station
- List of monastic houses in Bedfordshire
