= Millbrook, Bedfordshire =

Village in Bedfordshire, England

Coordinates: 52.039°N 0.525°W

Millbrook
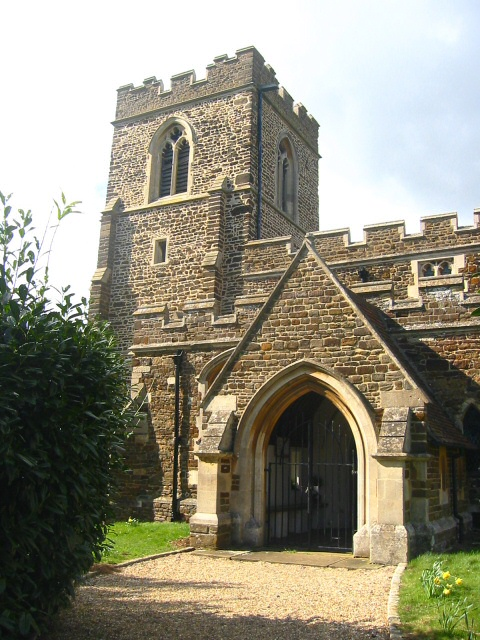
- St Michael & All Angels church, Millbrook

- Location within Bedfordshire
- Population: 130 (2001); 147 (2011 Census)
- OS grid reference: TL011593
- Civil parish: Millbrook
- Unitary authority: Central Bedfordshire
- Ceremonial county: Bedfordshire
- Region: East
- Country: England
- Sovereign state: United Kingdom
- Post town: BEDFORD
- Postcode district: MK45
- Dialling code: 01525
- Police: Bedfordshire
- Fire: Bedfordshire
- Ambulance: East of England
- UK Parliament: Mid Bedfordshire

Millbrook is a small village and civil parish near Bedford, England. It had a population of 147 according to the 2011 Census. Millbrook railway station, on the Marston Vale Line, is about two miles (3 km) from the village. The parish church, dedicated to St Michael and All Angels, is Grade II* listed.

The vale adjoining Millbrook is reputed to be the location that inspired the 'Slough of Despond' in John Bunyan's The Pilgrim's Progress.

Millbrook is also home to the Millbrook Proving Ground and The Millbrook Golf Club, formerly Lyshott Heath Golf Club.
