= Brogborough =

Village in Bedfordshire, England

Coordinates: 52.0365°N 0.5946°W

- Location within Bedfordshire
- Interactive map of Brogborough
- Population: 343; 302 (2011 Census)
- OS grid reference: SP965385
- Unitary authority: Central Bedfordshire
- Ceremonial county: Bedfordshire
- Region: East
- Country: England
- Sovereign state: United Kingdom
- Post town: BEDFORD
- Postcode district: MK43
- Dialling code: 01525
- Police: Bedfordshire
- Fire: Bedfordshire
- Ambulance: East of England
- UK Parliament: Mid Bedfordshire

Brogborough is a village and civil parish in the Central Bedfordshire district of Bedfordshire, England, by junction 13 of the M1 motorway. According to the 2001, census it had a population of 343, reducing to 302 at the 2011 Census. The village is in the Marston Vale, about 2.5 miles (4 km) east of Milton Keynes in Buckinghamshire.

For information on aspects of the archaeology and history of Brogborough see:

== Brogborough Lake ==
Home to the Brogborough Windsurfing Club, the 220-acre (0.89 km^{2}) lake is solely dedicated to Windsurfing and Stand up paddle surfing.

== Grand Union Canal branch ==
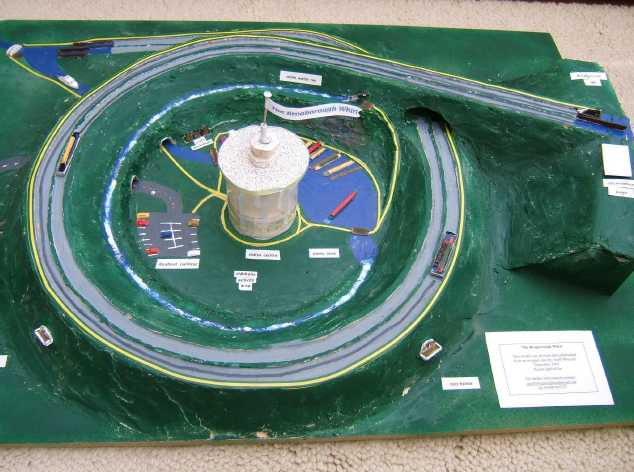
Model of proposed spiral boat lift

There is a proposal to create a new branch of the Grand Union Canal between Milton Keynes and Bedford. The terrain is broadly favourable for most of the route, but Brogborough Hill creates a formidable obstacle.

Options being considered include a tunnel under the hill, or a Falkirk Wheel or the 'Brogborough Whirl' plan to go over it.
