= National Institute for Research into Aquatic Habitats =

- Interactive map of National Institute for Research into Aquatic Habitats
- 52.072179°N 0.497186°W
- Location: Stewartby, Bedfordshire
- Land area: 100 hectares (250 acres)

The National Institute for Research into Aquatic Habitats (commonly abbreviated as NIRAH) was a planned freshwater public aquarium in Stewartby, Bedfordshire. Originally sited at a 100 hectare (250 acre) location, with an expected cost of £350 million, the project failed to meet its planned completion date in 2012. The site of the aquarium was sold in 2015, with an expected loss of £4 million.

== History ==
The project was granted planning permission in 2007, with estimated costs ranging from £350 million to £600 million. The proposed site was a 100 hectare (250 acre) site of a former brickworks in Stewartby, Bedfordshire, with completion expected during 2012. This was not met, with the project hampered by a number of delays and "a lack of investment" until planning permission expired in 2014. The site was sold in June 2015 for an "undisclosed amount".

=== Public investment ===
The project had been supported by public money, including more than £1.2 million from the former Bedfordshire County Council and £2 million from the Department for Business, Innovation and Skills. The BBC noted in March 2014 that "[n]either the government, nor the councils, are currently seeking to recover the debt, much of which is secured against the value of the land." Administrators involved in the sale of the land confirmed in June 2015 that there would be "minimal recovery" of the then-£5 million debt.
