= Millbrook Proving Ground =

Vehicle test facility in Bedfordshire, England

Coordinates: 52.0433°N 0.5389°W

Millbrook Proving Ground, located at Millbrook, Bedfordshire, is one of the largest vehicle testing centres in Europe. It is close to the M1 motorway and Bedford.

== History ==
Modelled on the Milford Proving Ground operated by General Motors (GM) in Michigan, construction began in 1968. It was created by GM's UK subsidiary Bedford before control was transferred to GM's Vauxhall brand. A first class proving ground requires both hills and flat land, so the traditional choice of a former Royal Air Force airfield, used by many other automotive companies, was ruled out. Many sites around the UK were surveyed before Millbrook chosen. It had the additional benefit of being close to Vauxhall's production site at Luton.

Construction began in 1968, and once it opened in 1970 it became the test site for many European GM subsidiaries including Vauxhall and Bedford.

When Bedford withdrew from the bus and truck markets in December 1986, GM put Millbrook up for sale. In 1988, the site was transferred to a new company, Millbrook Proving Ground Limited as part of Lotus and it offered its facilities to non-GM companies. When GM sold Lotus in 1993, Millbrook was transferred to GM Holdings UK Limited, as an independently managed company which diversified into all aspects of vehicle testing including emission control. In October 2013, it was purchased by Rutland Partners. In September 2016 it was sold to Spectris. In December 2020 it was announced that Millbrook would be divested from the Spectris portfolio of companies and acquired by UTAC CERAM for £133 million. The sale was completed on 2 February 2021.

== Current facilities ==
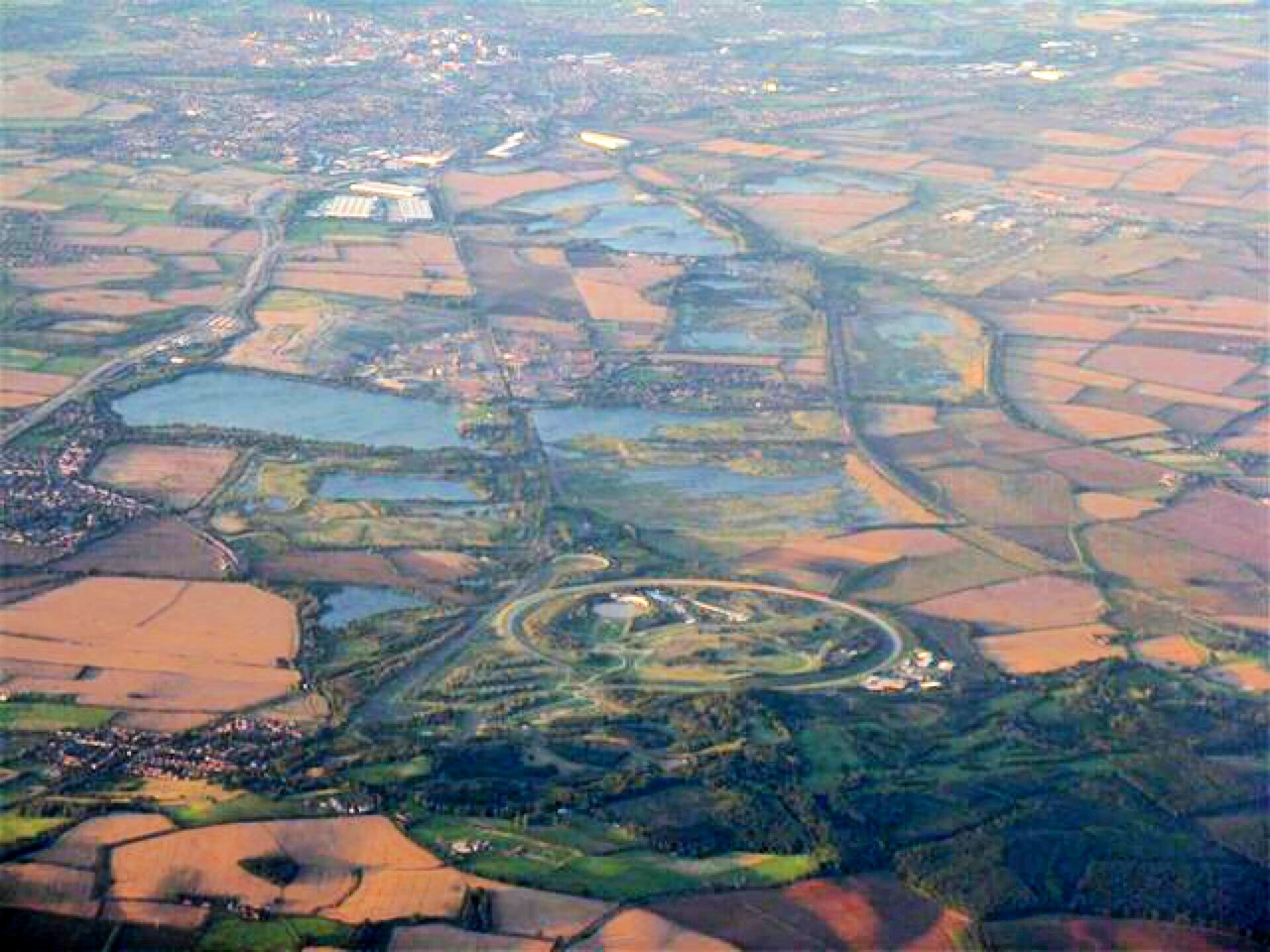
Millbrook Proving Ground

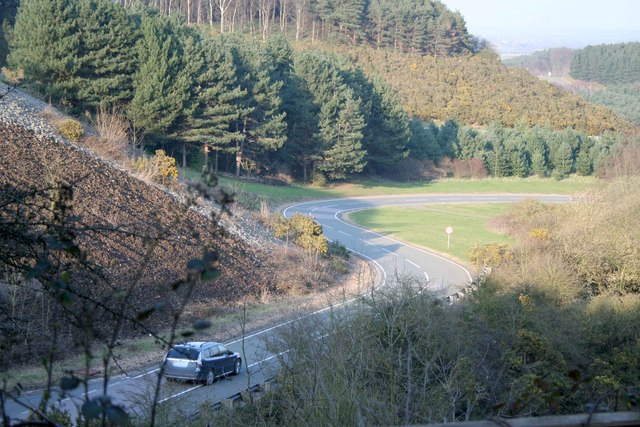
The Hill Route

The centre provides vehicle test and development facilities including:

- Vehicle and system assessment
- Powertrain development
- Safety testing.
- Climate controlled chamber that can simulate conditions from -20 to +50 °C

These are staffed by engineering teams who work with manufacturers on their test and development programmes.

Millbrook has a wide range of types of test tracks. The most prominent are the:

- Hill Route – divided into three sections or loops which contain progressively steeper gradients as well as many tight corners. Sometimes seen in motoring television programmes, for example Top Gear, particularly the "ski-jump" where it is very easy for vehicles to become airborne.
- Outer and Inner Handling (or City Course) circuits – extremely technical twisty circuits used for extreme testing of vehicle dynamic characteristics.
- High Speed Bowl – a two-mile banked circuit used for higher speed testing.

The proving ground maintains a high standard of security and secrecy to protect the commercial interests of its customers. Public access is not generally permitted and the facility is hidden from view. Limited supervised access to the facilities is available through some driver training organisations.

== Film and television ==
Millbrook has been used in the filming of many television programmes and films including:

- Casino Royale
- Britain's Worst Driver
- Top Gear:
  - Series 6, episode 2
  - Series 8, episode 1
  - Series 10, episode 7
  - Series 12, episode 1
  - Series 28, episode 2
- The Grand Tour:
  - Series 3, episode 9
- Chris Moyles Show - Car Roulette Competition
- Wheeler Dealers
- Fifth Gear
- Samsung SM510 truck commercial (1994, South Korea)
