= Bedford St Johns railway station =

Railway station in Bedfordshire, England

Bedford St Johns
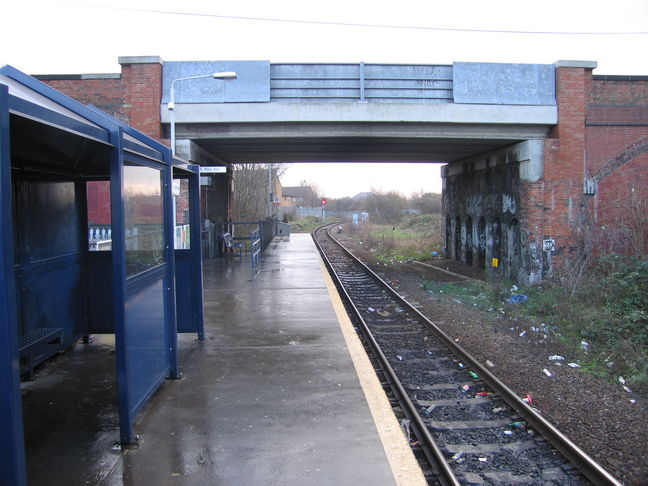
- The station, looking south

General information
- Location: Bedford, Borough of Bedford, England
- Coordinates: 52.1294°N 0.4677°W
- Grid reference: TL049490
- Manager: London Northwestern Railway
- Platforms: 1

Other information
- Station code: BSJ
- Classification: DfT category F2

Key dates
- 18 November 1846: Opened as Bedford
- 2 June 1924: Renamed Bedford St Johns
- 1 January 1968: Closure of Varsity Line
- 15 July 1968: Closed to goods, became unstaffed halt
- 14 May 1984: Resited

Passengers
- 2020/21: ▼39,046
- 2021/22: ▲108,408
- 2022/23: ▲141,586
- 2023/24: ▲151,452
- 2024/25: ▲175,552
Location
Notes
- Passenger statistics from the Office of Rail and Road

Bedford St Johns is one of two railway stations that serve Bedford, England. It lies on the Marston Vale Line, which links Bletchley and Bedford railway stations. As of September 2026, it is unstaffed and is operated by London Northwestern Railway.

St Johns was originally the Varsity Line (the historic Oxford–Cambridge line) station for Bedford (in addition to the then Bedford Midland station on the Midland Main Line). The role of St Johns was diminished following the substantial closure of the Varsity Line in 1967, which left only the section between St Johns and Bletchley in operation. British Rail closed the original St Johns station on 14 May 1984 and extended services to/from Bletchley to Bedford Midland, using a new chord line. The current Bedford St Johns station was built (also in 1984) on this chord. St Johns is due to be relocated again a little to the north, as an element of the plan for East West Rail.

== History ==
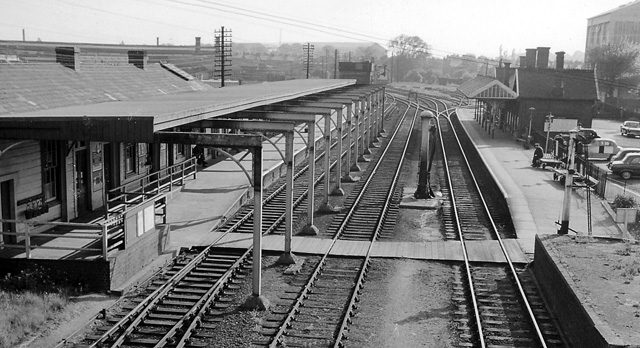
The original station in June 1962

=== Opening ===
The station was opened in November 1846 by the Bedford Railway as the eastern terminus of its line from Bletchley, the first line to reach the town. The station was on the west side of the A600 London Road, (Note: Location: grid reference TL 052 489.) with the main station buildings on the south side of the line facing the public house. The goods yard was further west nearer the river Great Ouse to receive river traffic. A second connecting line to the goods yard created a triangle which diverted drainage to produce a pond which supplied the station and small two-road locomotive shed.

=== 1875 accident ===
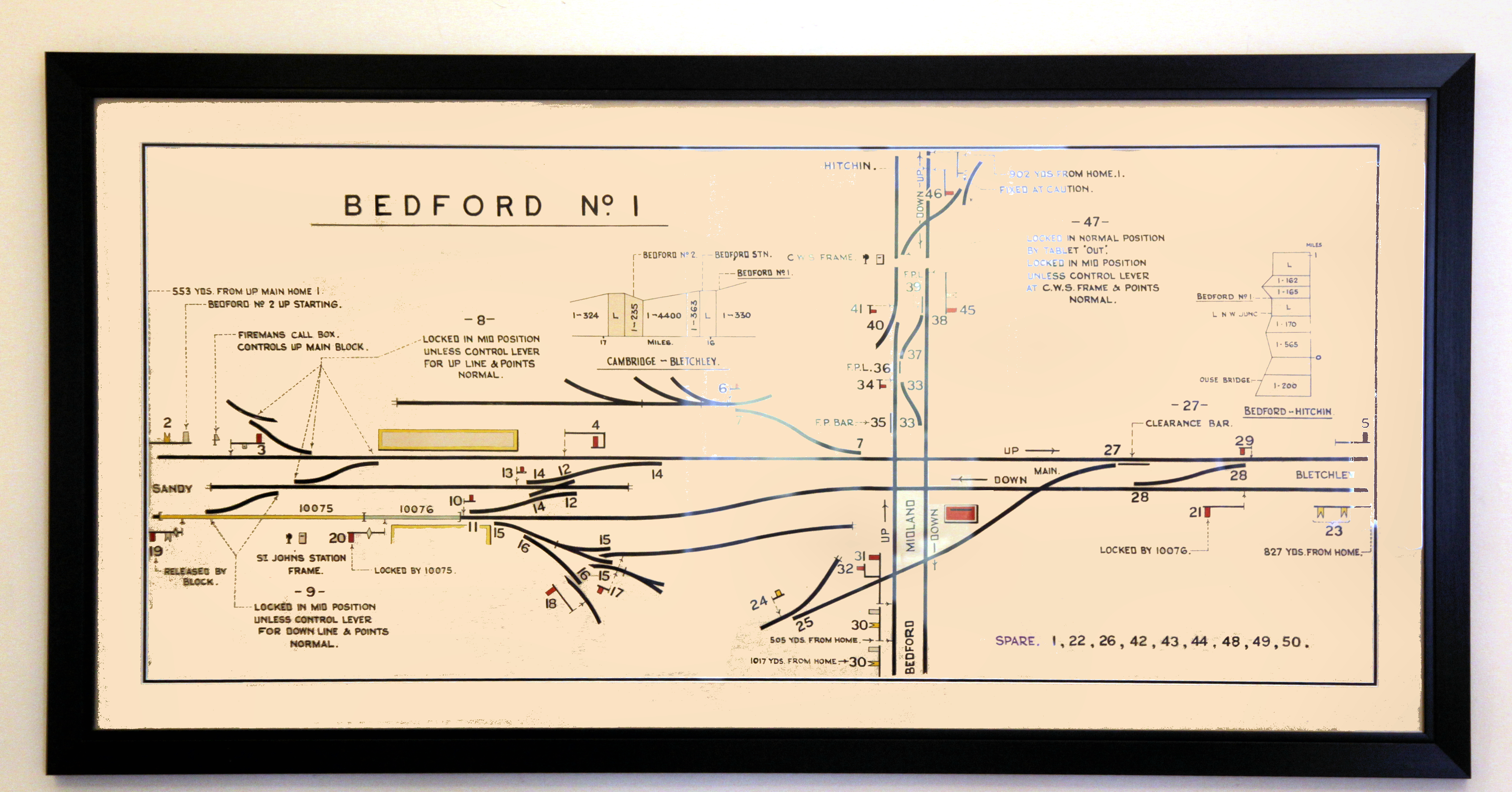
A signalling diagram from the former Bedford No.1 signal box (LNWR)

A second station was opened in Bedford in 1857 on the Midland Railway's Leicester to Hitchin line. The route chosen by the Midland took it across the earlier line at a point near the Bletchley end of the triangle, and a level crossing was built. In March 1875, a Midland passenger train collided with the rear coaches of a Bedford service, killing one passenger and injuring four others. The subsequent enquiry identified a badly-positioned Bedford starter signal as a major cause of the accident. To remedy the problem, a 29-lever signal box was opened in 1877 to control new interlocked signals, and block signalling was introduced throughout the Bedford line, which had been extended to Cambridge.

=== Decline and relocation ===
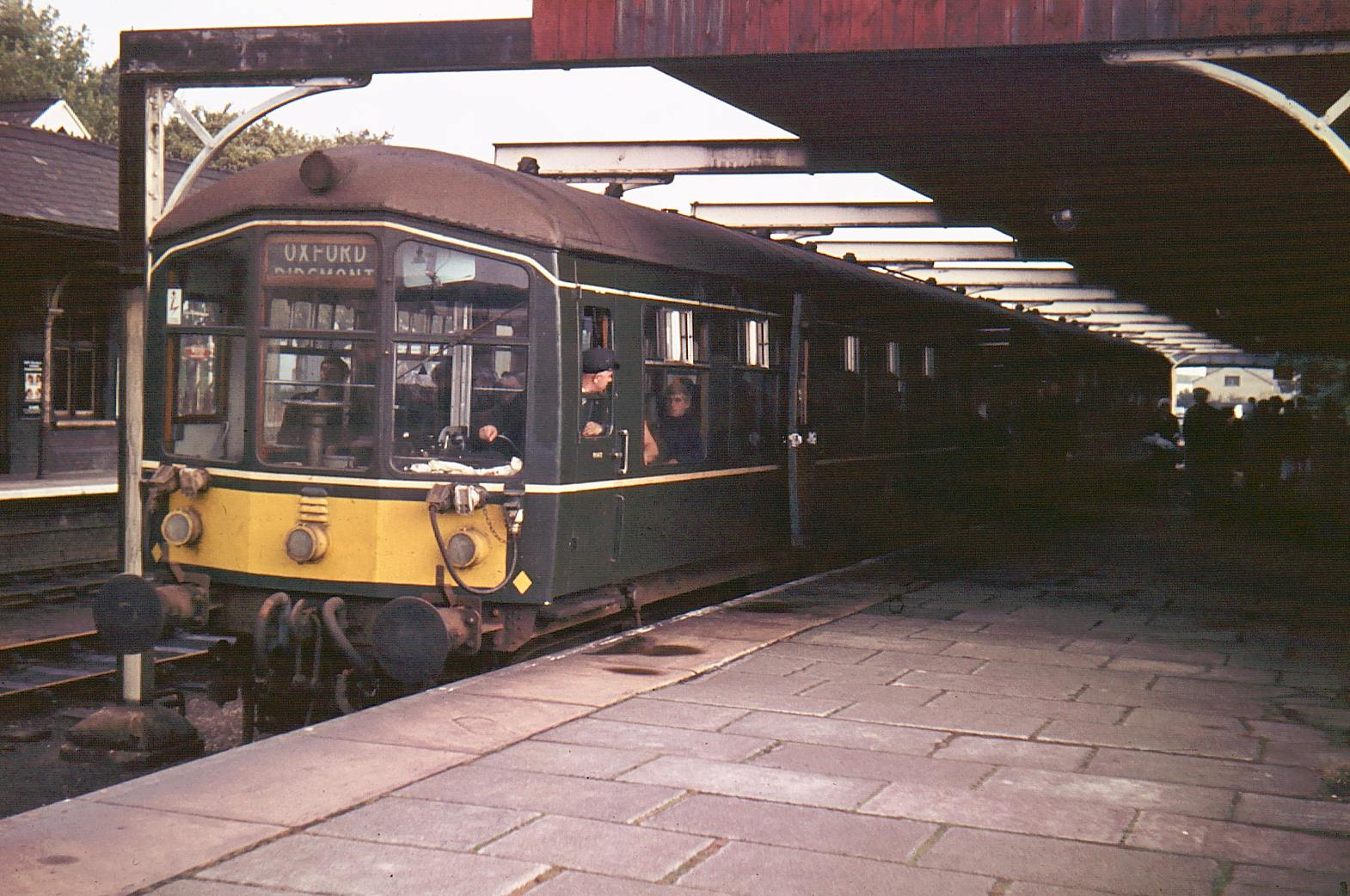
An Oxford-bound train in October 1967, shortly before withdrawal of this service

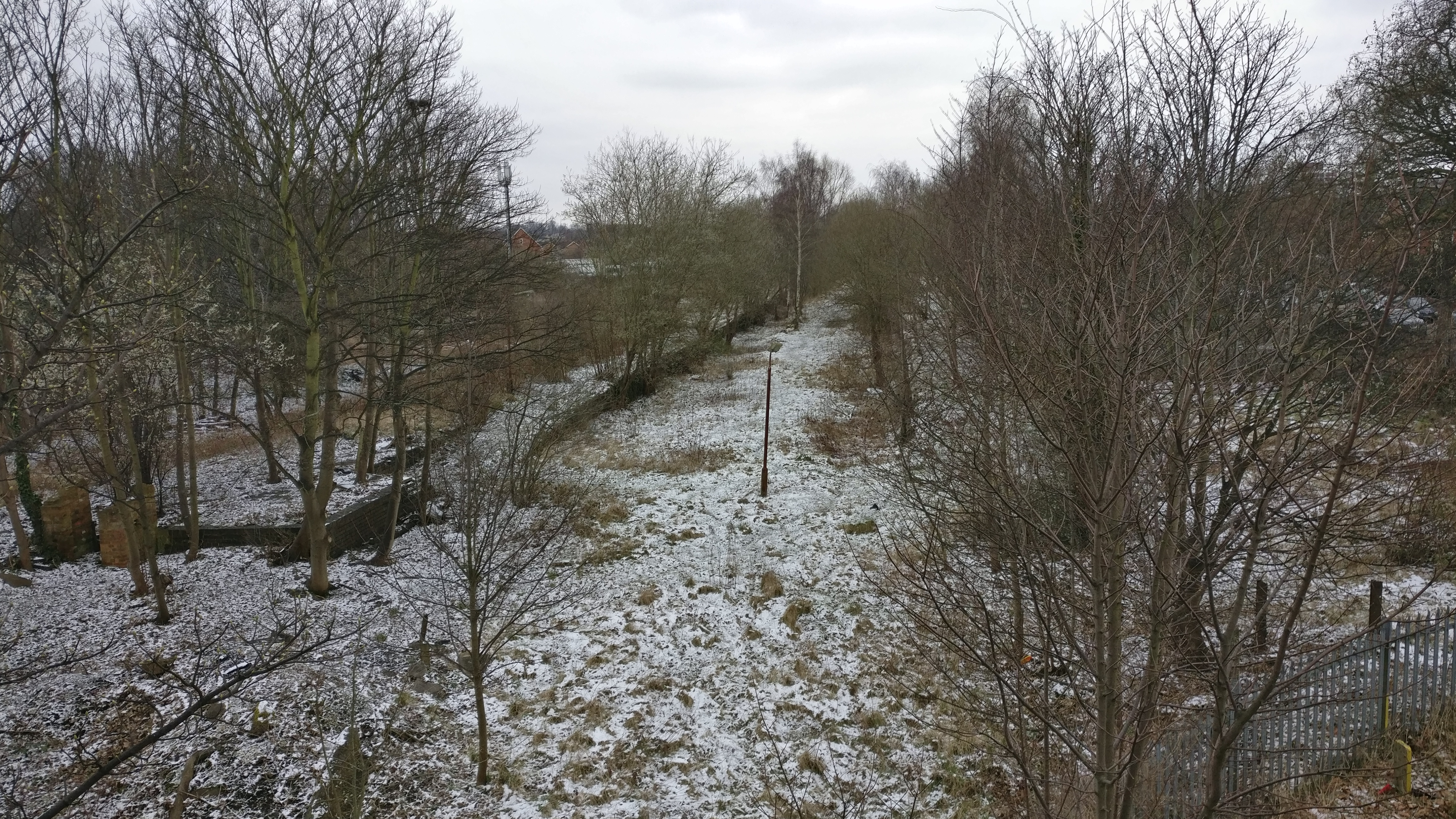
The site of the original station in 2018

Although the Second World War saw the Oxford-Cambridge line handle unprecedented levels of traffic, it suffered from a lack of investment in the post-war years. The 1955 Modernisation Plan proposed improvements to the line, believing it could be a strategic cross-country route for freight across three British Railways regions without having to pass through London. The policy was however to change within a few years, leaving the Bletchley Flyover as a testament of the change of course. The first attempt to close the line came in 1959, but was unsuccessful in the face of local opposition. Hopes for the line thereafter rose when it did not figure in the Beeching Report, but it was nevertheless proposed for closure in 1964, with the Oxford—Bletchley and Bedford—Cambridge routes closing after the last day of service on 30 December 1967.

The Bletchley - Bedford route, now known as the Marston Vale Line, survived in a downgraded form as goods facilities were withdrawn and the stations became unstaffed halts. The station, now a terminus, came under the authority of then area manager at Bedford Midland. By March 1971, the main station buildings and water tower had been demolished, leaving it as a terminus halt. A third attempt to close the line in 1972 was resisted by the Bedford Rail Users' Association.

In 1984, a replacement station was opened in the former freight yard, at the north end of the triangle, which enabled services to continue to Bedford Midland. The new connection runs over the route of the Midland's Hitchin line, which closed in 1964. The old station site was abandoned, although some of the furniture, such as the lampposts, was not removed. The site has now been reclaimed by nature.

| Preceding station | Disused railways | Following station |
|---|---|---|
| Kempston and Elstow Halt | British Railways; Varsity Line | Willington |

== Services ==
All services at Bedford St Johns are operated by London Northwestern Railway.

The typical off-peak service is one train per hour in each direction between Bletchley and Bedford, which runs on weekdays and Saturdays only using Class 150 diesel multiple units.

| Preceding station | National Rail | Following station |
|---|---|---|
| Kempston Hardwick towards Bletchley | London Northwestern Railway Marston Vale Line Monday–Saturday only | Bedford Terminus |
Planned future service
| Stewartby | East West Rail Oxford to Cambridge | Bedford |

== Community Rail Partnership ==
In common with others on the Marston Vale Line, the station is covered by the Marston Vale Community Rail Partnership, which aims to increase use of the line by involving local people.

== Future ==
The East West Rail Company is working to reinstate the entire Oxford to Cambridge route. In May 2023, the company announced that its preferred route between Bedford and Cambridge will continue to use the current route via St Johns across the Midland Main Line, then north via Bedford station; here, it turns east towards Tempsford, rather than following the old Varsity Line alignment through the original Bedford St Johns station site.

The St Johns station is to be relocated a little further to the north to Kempston Road, to permit the track to be dualled. As of November 2024, services have now been proposed to stop additionally at Bedford St Johns and Stewartby. However, as the route is still undergoing consultation, the plans have not been fully decided.
