= Universal United Kingdom =

Planned theme park in Bedfordshire, England

Universal United Kingdom Resort
- Logo of the resort

- Concept art
- Interactive map of Universal United Kingdom Resort
- Location: Kempston Hardwick, Bedford, England
- Coordinates: 52°05′23.1″N 0°29′58.5″W
- Status: Under construction
- Owner: NBCUniversal (Comcast)
- Operated by: Universal Destinations & Experiences
- Theme: Show business
- Area: 476–700 acres (193–283 ha)
- Website: universalukproject.co.uk

The Universal United Kingdom Resort is an under construction theme park and resort complex in Bedfordshire, England. The park will be the seventh Universal Studios Resort, and the first in Europe since NBCUniversal sold Universal Mediterranea in 2004. The proposed development includes a theme park comprising multiple themed lands, designed to incorporate Universal Destinations & Experiences' signature approach to immersive storytelling, rides, attractions, and live entertainment. The initial plans for the resort also provide for a 500-room hotel and an integrated retail, dining, and entertainment complex.

The resort has an anticipated completion date in 2031. The initial phase of the theme park is planned to occupy approximately 476 acres (193 hectares; 0.744 square miles), with provisions for future expansion of the site to a maximum of 700 acres (280 hectares; 1.1 square miles).

== History ==
Prior to the proposed development of its United Kingdom resort, Universal Destinations & Experiences had made two previous attempts to establish a theme park and resort destination in Europe, though neither project ultimately progressed to completion. The first, a planned park in Sénart, France, was cancelled due to the underperformance of Euro Disneyland. The second was the 1998 acquisition of PortAventura and later development of Universal Mediterranea in Salou, Spain, which the company sold in 2004.

In August 2023, Comcast acquired construction and development company Cloud Wing UK, including 476 acres (0.7 sq mi; 1.9 km^{2}) of land in Bedfordshire. The plans were officially announced on 19 December 2023, followed by a public consultation between April and May 2024, which received over 6,000 responses.

In April 2025, Prime Minister Keir Starmer confirmed that the government supported the project, with construction beginning on 12 January 2026. Universal announced a planned opening in 2031, subject to planning approvals, and released the first official concept art. The company estimates that, by 2055, the project could contribute nearly £50 billion to the UK economy. This projection includes the creation of approximately 28,000 jobs across construction, operations, and the wider supply chain. The development is also forecast to attract around 8.5 million visitors in its first year of operation, positioning it among the most significant new tourism destinations in Europe.

On 16 December 2025, planning permission was approved by the Ministry of Housing, Communities and Local Government via the issuance of a Special Development Order (SDO).

On 3 June 2026, Universal announced that the theme park would be named Universal United Kingdom Resort. The government has pledged to provide £1.3bn in funding for infrastructure surrounding the resort and Universal is to spend £5bn to build the resort itself, with an additional £1bn in future investment within the first decade. On the same date, Bedford Borough Council welcomed the start of works on the site.

On 13 July 2026, Universal opened up its 'Talent Portal', for prospective workers to apply for employment at Universal United Kingdom Resort, across a range of role types.

On 15 September 2026, Comcast NBCUniversal released its list of 23 contractors and consultancy firms selected for the project. Key appointments included architectural design by Gensler, project management by Mace Consult, and civil engineering and construction contracts awarded to Arcadis, Sir Robert McAlpine, Bovis, and Morgan Sindall.

== Proposal ==
The planned site is around 3 miles (5 km) south of Bedford town centre. It is bordered by the A421 to the west, the planned East West Main Line to the north-east, (Note: The section between Bletchley (Milton Keynes) and Bedford, known as the Marston Vale line, is planned to become part of the planned East West main line, the new line between Oxford and Cambridge via Milton Keynes (for the West Coast Main Line) and Tempsford (for the East Coast Main Line). See East West Rail.) the Midland Main Line to the east, and Broadmead Road to the south, and comprises up to 700 acres (280 ha) of land, including 476 acres (193 ha) previously purchased.

The proposed development is structured into four principal zones, each defined by its function and spatial relationship within the site. The "Core Zone" would contain the primary theme park attractions and associated hotel accommodation, forming the central focus of the resort. Immediately to the north lies the "Lake Zone", centred on existing lakes created from former clay extraction at the historic Kempston Hardwick brickworks. This area is designated for mixed-use development and is anticipated to accommodate leisure, dining, retail, and entertainment uses comparable in concept to a Universal CityWalk-style district.

Access and connectivity would be provided through two principal transport interchanges: the "East Gateway Zone" and the "West Gateway Zone". These gateway areas are intended to manage visitor arrivals and departures, integrating parking, public transport, and other supporting infrastructure to facilitate access to the resort.

The plans include expanding the partially constructed Wixams railway station and building a new station on the East West line to replace Kempston Hardwick railway station, as well as upgrading the local road network, including dedicated slip roads from the A421.

== See also ==
- Legoland Windsor Resort
- London Resort
