= Forest of Marston Vale =

Community forest in Bedfordshire, England

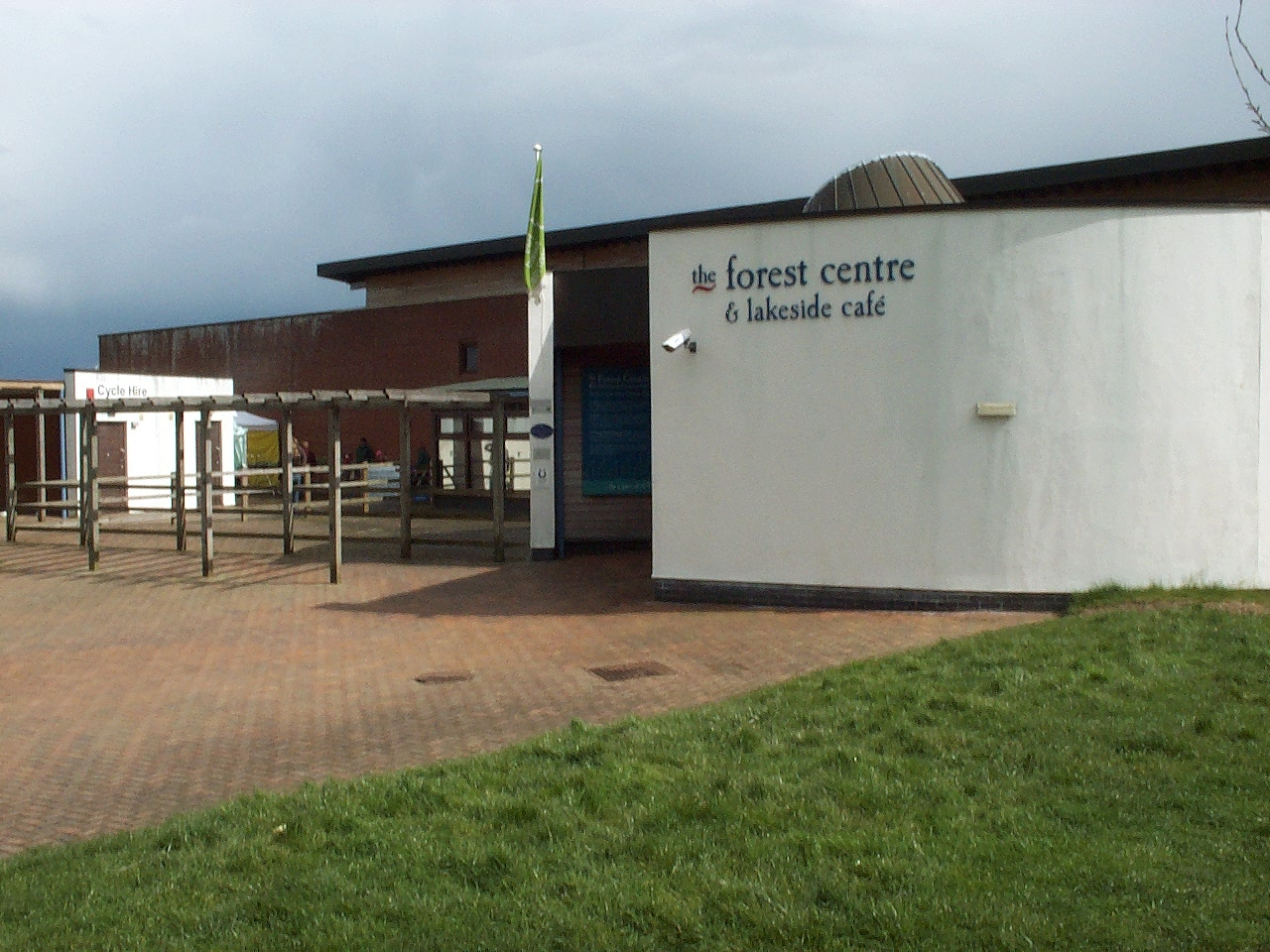
- Marston Vale Forest Centre

Map
- Interactive map of area around the Forest of Marston Vale

Geography
- Location: Bedfordshire, England
- Coordinates: 52°03′53″N 0°31′58″W

Administration
- Status: community forest
- Established: 2000
- Website: www.marstonvale.org

The Forest of Marston Vale is an evolving community forest in Marston Vale, which runs south west from the towns of Bedford and Kempston in Bedfordshire, England, towards the M1 motorway. It is operated by a registered charity called the Forest of Marston Vale Trust.

The vale is traditionally a brickmaking area, but brickmaking industry has been running down since the 1970s. It has left a large amount of spoiled countryside containing several large empty pits some of which have now been converted into lakes. The Forest of Marston Vale is one of 12 community forest projects in the United Kingdom. It was initiated by the Countryside Agency and the Forestry Commission, in partnership with Bedfordshire County Council, Mid Bedfordshire District Council, and Bedford Borough Council. The total area covered is 61 square miles (158 km^{2}), but most of this land is in private ownership. There are incentives for landowners to plant trees, and the target for community forests in general is to reach 30% tree cover.

The principal public open space in the Forest of Marston Vale is the Millennium Country Park which covers 1 square mile (2.5 km^{2}) and was opened in 2000. The park features several lakes including the large Stewartby Lake and extensive wetlands. There is a visitor centre called the Forest Centre, which has a Lakeside Cafe, shop, toilets and bike rental. According to the official website the park attracts around a quarter of a million visitors a year. There are plans to create a larger park of over 3 square miles (7.8 km^{2}) to the east of Bedford, which will be called Bedford River Valley Park.

On 26 January 2018, the Environment Agency granted a permit to Covanta Energy Limited to operate what will be the UK's largest waste incinerator, next to the forest. The effect of this development remains to be seen.

== See also ==
- Community Forests in England
