= Kempston and Elstow Halt railway station =

Former railway station in Bedfordshire, England

Coordinates: 52.1133°N 0.4802°W

Kempston & Elstow Halt
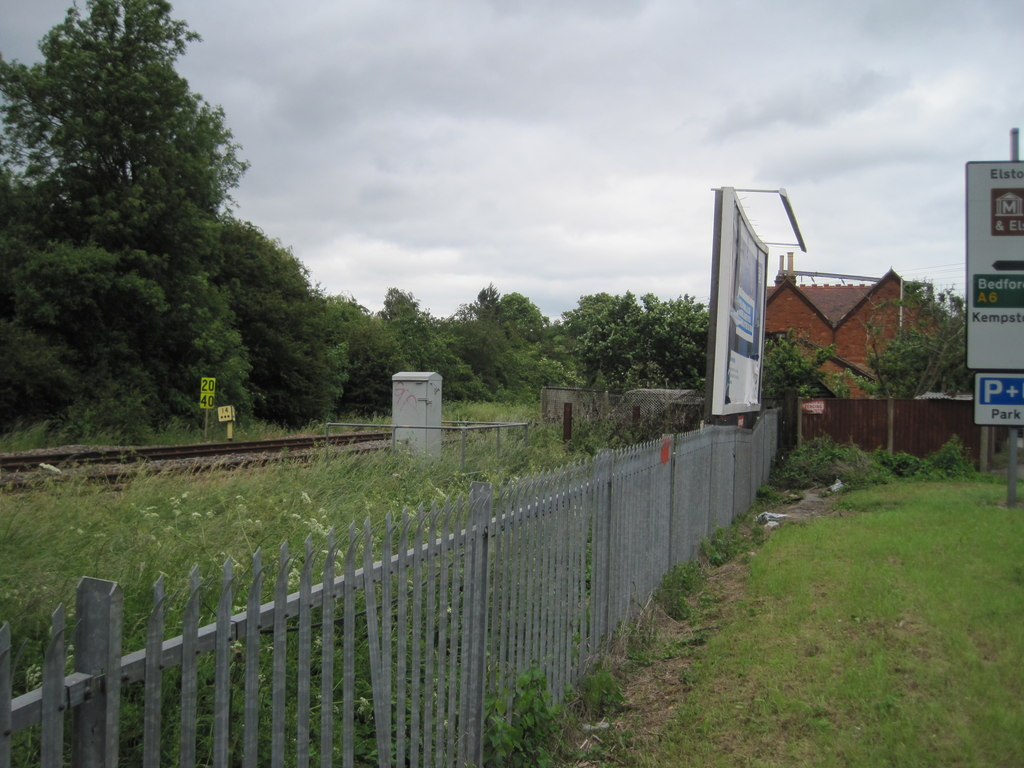
- The site of the station in 2012

General information
- Location: Kempston, Bedford; England
- Grid reference: TL042471
- Platforms: 2

Other information
- Status: Disused

History
- Original company: London and North Western Railway
- Post-grouping: London, Midland and Scottish Railway

Key dates
- 1905: Opened (Kempston Halt)
- January 1908: Renamed (Kempston & Elstow Halt)
- 1 January 1917: Temporary closure
- 5 May 1919: Reopened
- 5 May 1941: Temporary closure
- 7 February 1949: Official closure
Location

Kempston & Elstow Halt was a railway station on the Varsity Line which served the Bedfordshire town of Kempston in England. Opened in 1905, it was closed temporarily during both world wars and did not reopen after 1941, being officially closed in 1949.

== History ==
Kempston & Elstow was one of three halts opened by the London and North Western Railway in 1905 between Stewartby and Bedford. Their opening coincided with the introduction of a steam railmotor on the Varsity Line, and each was conveniently sited alongside a level crossing. Kempston Halt, as it was known until 1908, was constructed close to "Cow Bridge", an old road bridge which carried the present A421 over a tributary of the River Great Ouse. All three halts were opened on the same day and all were simultaneously temporarily closed as a First World War economy measure in 1917, reopening two years later only to close again in 1941 during the Second World War. This time, however, only one – Kempston Hardwick – was to reopen, the others officially closing as from February 1949.

The crossing near the station was staffed by a crossing keeper from 1846 to 1868 when the diversion of the road by the Midland Railway led to the removal of the crossing. A railway crossing cottage had been provided for the use of the keeper, and was later used by a porter from Kempston & Elstow Halt. Today it is located near the Kempston Interchange Park and the station building can still be seen from the B530.

Preceding station	Disused railways	Following station
Kempston Hardwick	British Railways; Varsity Line	Bedford St Johns

== Present day ==
Nothing remains of the halt, though the crossing keeper's cottage still remains as a private dwelling.
