= Stewartby =

Village and civil parish in Bedfordshire, England

Coordinates: 52.0691°N 0.5139°W

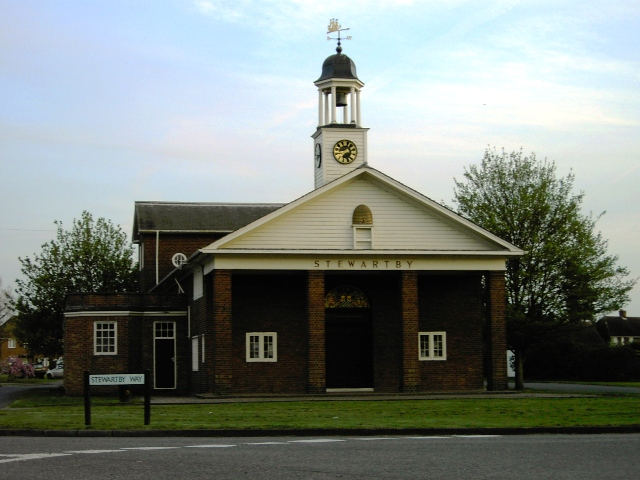
- Stewartby

- Location within Bedfordshire
- Population: 1,212; 1,190 (2011 Census)
- OS grid reference: TL020423
- Civil parish: Stewartby
- Unitary authority: Bedford
- Ceremonial county: Bedfordshire
- Region: East
- Country: England
- Sovereign state: United Kingdom
- Post town: Bedford
- Postcode district: MK43
- Dialling code: 01234
- Police: Bedfordshire
- Fire: Bedfordshire
- Ambulance: East of England
- UK Parliament: Mid Bedfordshire

Stewartby is a model village and civil parish in Bedfordshire, England, originally built for the workers of the London Brick Company. The village was designed and built to the plans of the company's architect Mr F W Walker, laid out on 'Garden City' principle, a later and more modern development than such better-known Victorian model villages as Saltaire. Started in 1926, the village was then called Wootton Pillinge, Stewartby is also a later model than Woodlands which was first planned in 1905. The later retirement bungalow development of the 1950s and 1960s with the pavilion community centre in their midst was designed by the neo-Georgian architect Professor Sir Albert Richardson. Today, Stewartby parish also includes Kempston Hardwick.

== Brickworks ==
Originally two Wootton farming settlements, Wootton Pillinge and neighbouring Wootton Broadmead, the Wootton Pillinge LBC village was in 1936 renamed Stewartby, taking its new name from the Stewart family, directors of London Brick Company since 1900. The family's son Sir Malcolm Stewart had amalgamated LBC with the Forders Company in the village in the 1920s.

Stewartby was the largest brickworks in terms of output in the world. The site closed in 2008 as the owners, Hanson, could not meet UK limits for sulphur dioxide emissions. The four remaining chimneys were due to be demolished upon closure but these were initially listed for preservation of Bedfordshire's brick-related history and were due to remain, however this since changed and the chimneys were demolished on 26 September 2021.

The brickworks was home to the world's biggest kiln and produced 500 million bricks at the height of production.

BJ Forder & Son opened its first brickworks in Elstow in 1897 before relocating to Wootton Pillinge in 1920.

Wootton Pillinge was renamed Stewartby in 1937 in recognition of the Stewart family who had been instrumental in developing the brickworks.

The firm became London Brick Company and Forders Limited in 1926, and shortened to London Brick Company in 1936.

At the height of the industry's production there were 167 brick chimneys in the Marston Vale. There were four chimneys in Stewartby, but these were demolished in 2021.

In the 1970s, Bedfordshire produced 20% of England's bricks.

At its peak London Brick Company had its own ambulance and fire crews, a horticultural department and a photographic department, as well as its own swimming pool inside the factory, and ran a number of sports clubs.

More than £1 million was spent on Stewartby Brickworks in 2005–7 in an attempt to reduce sulphur dioxide emissions.

The factory used Lower Oxford Clay, which contains circa 5% marine organics, formed 150 million years ago when it was on the sea bed. This reduced the coal requirement, as the organic material burned.

Stewartby Brickworks closed in May 2008.

In 2021, it was announced that the four remaining chimneys were to be demolished, as the landowners deemed them unsafe; they were later demolished on 26 September 2021 at 11:15am.

In December 2023, Universal Destinations & Experiences announced that it had purchased 480 acres of land on the site of the brickworks, with the company exploring the possibility of building a theme park and resort in the area, citing nearby Bedford's proximity to London and Luton Airport.

== Infrastructure ==
The village is served by Stewartby railway station on the Marston Vale Line.

The village was to have been the planned location for the proposed National Institute for Research into Aquatic Habitats (NIRAH). This project was scrapped in June 2015 due to lack of investment funding.

The new housing development is called Hanson's Reach. Phase one involves 750 new houses being built.

It is planned to construct a very large waste incinerator in an abandoned clay pit next to the village.

== Education ==
Kimberley College is a sixth form centre which opened in Stewartby in September 2013.

There is a lower school in Stewartby called Broadmead Lower School, which was opened in 1965. The middle school is Marston Vale, which takes in children from the surrounding area.

== Sport and leisure ==
Stewartby has been home to Stewartby Village Football Club since 1999. In the 2009/10 season it was in the Bedfordshire County League Division 4.

Stewartby is also home to Stewartby Amateur Operatic and Dramatic Society which has been putting on performances of concerts and Gilbert and Sullivan operettas since 1951.

There is a large park in Stewartby which has a new slide and zip wire. There are plans to extend the park. A BMX track has been built behind the club house.

The railway in Stewartby was opened in 1905 and used to form part of the Varsity Line, from Oxford to Cambridge. There are plans to reopen the closed parts of the line under the East West Rail scheme. The line now sees an hourly service Monday to Saturday between Bedford and Bletchley, operated by London Northwestern Railway using Class 230 trains.

The lake is home to Stewartby Water Sports Club, a not for profit organisation which promotes Angling, Power Boat Racing, Sailing, Wakeboarding and Waterskiing. There are also opportunities for open-water swimming, paddleboarding, canoeing and wind-surfing which are organised from within the club.

== See also ==
- Stewartby railway station
- Woodlands Model Village
- Port Sunlight
