= Community forestry =

Model of forestry

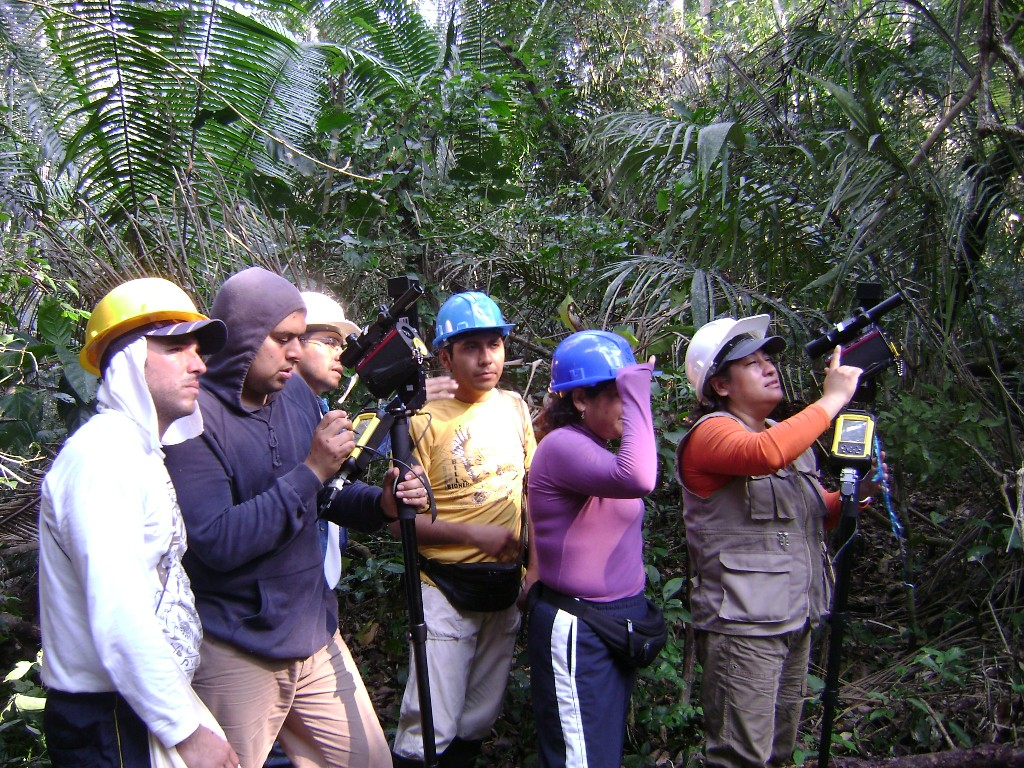
National Forest Inventory of Peru

Community forestry is a participatory model of forestry that gained prominence in the 1970s in which local communities take an active role in forest management and land use decision making. Community forestry is defined by the Food and Agricultural Organization of the United Nations as "any situation that intimately involves local people in forestry activity". Unlike centralized management systems, community forestry more strongly emphasizes the participation and collaboration of local community stakeholders, along with government and non-governmental organizations (NGOs). The level of involvement of each of these groups is dependent on the specific community forest project, the management system and the region.

Examples of community forestry have existed throughout history and exist today across South Asia, Africa, Latin America, and parts of Europe, often integrating traditional ecological knowledge with modern management. These initiatives are recognized for their contributions to climate resilience, forest regeneration, and socio-economic development. Many projects aim to protect community livelihoods, enhance resource access, reduce poverty, or promote sustainable land management, however, these initiatives can face many challenges in practice.

== History ==
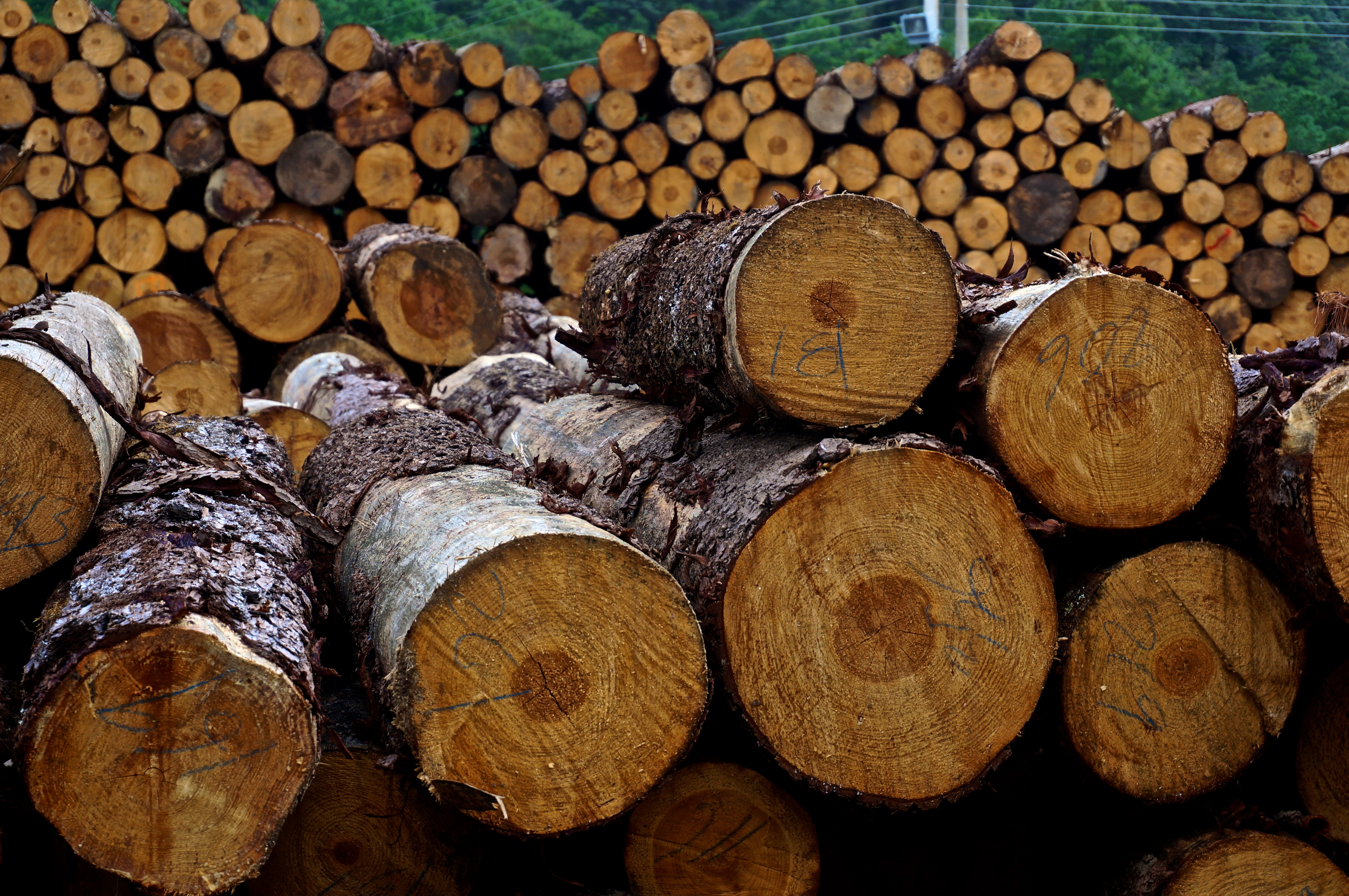
Logs from a community forest in Oaxaca, Mexico

Community forestry is a branch of forestry that deals with the communal management of forests for generating income from timber and non-timber forest products on one hand, and managing for ecosystem services such as watershed conservation, carbon sequestration and aesthetic values on the other hand. It has been considered one of the most promising options of combining forest conservation with rural development, community empowerment and poverty reduction objectives.

The concept of community forestry first came to prominence in the mid-1970s but is rooted in historical land management systems that prioritized collective stewardship. For example, in pre-colonial Africa, community-managed forests served as critical sources of food, medicine, and cultural heritage, governed through traditional norms and local leadership structures. Similarly, before enclosure or other land privatization efforts, European commons allowed communities to access forests for grazing, fuelwood, and construction materials under shared use. Around the world, colonial governance and widespread land privatization disrupted these practices by replacing communal systems with centralized or private control. In regions such as India, colonial forestry policies prioritized timber extraction and commercial gains, often displacing indigenous communities and undermining traditional knowledge. This widespread alienation of local populations from forest resources led to widespread degradation and social unrest, prompting calls for reform in Africa and other continents.

The re-emergence of community forestry in the 20th century was driven by growing recognition of the ecological and social failures of centralized forest policy efforts. Early movements, such as India’s Joint Forest Management in the 1970s and Nepal’s Forest User Groups in the 1980s, attempted to improve the management of forest resources and address environmental issues due to the countries failing centralized forest policy. These early efforts illustrated the potential of participatory governance to address resource depletion and empower marginalized communities. In 1978, FAO’s seminal work, Forestry for Local Community Development, laid the foundation for integrating scientific forestry with traditional practices in the modern period, arguing that empowering local communities not only conserved resources but also improved socio-economic outcomes. More recently, in the past few decades, community forestry has been implemented in developing countries and has been modestly successful in its aims of sustainable forest management, climate change adaptation, and securing socio-economic benefits for local communities.

However, a study by the Overseas Development Institute has shown that the technical, managerial and financial requirements stipulated by community forestry frameworks are often incompatible with local realities and interests. A successful legal and institutional framework must incorporate the strengthening of existing institutions and enable the dissemination of locally appropriate practices as well as the local capacity for regulation and control. In practice, successful models have combined adaptive management with community-driven initiatives. For example, Mexico’s community forest enterprises (CFEs) demonstrated that decentralized governance could generate substantial economic benefits while maintaining ecological integrity. Similarly, Nepal’s participatory forest management made progress in reducing poverty and restoring forest cover.

As of 2016, FAO estimated that almost one-third of the world's forest area is under some form of community-based management.

== Principles and goals ==
=== Governance ===
Governance in community forestry emphasizes decentralization and participatory decision-making. Models such as Nepal’s Forest User Groups show how local empowerment can lead to improved conservation outcomes and equitable resource distribution. These groups operate democratically, with elected committees overseeing forest management, benefit-sharing, and conflict resolution.

Other governance systems include co-management frameworks, as seen in Brazil’s Amazon. These systems involve partnerships between local communities, NGOs, and government agencies to balance conservation goals with socio-economic development. However, successful governance requires transparent processes, capacity-building, and mechanisms to address power imbalances between partners.

=== Land tenure ===
Land tenure is a fundamental aspect of community forestry, affecting whether communities have the rights and security to invest in sustainable practices. In Mozambique, community forestry laws have helped formalize tenure arrangements, enabling local groups to manage forests and participate in carbon trading markets. However, challenges such as unclear boundaries, elite capture, and weak enforcement persist in many land tenure systems, threatening the viability of community forestry projects and creating uncertainty in terms of resource access.

The history of informal land tenure systems and land privatization must be addressed for community forestry projects to be successful. In Latin America, Mexico’s ejido system provides a notable example of how collective tenure arrangements can support long-term resource management and economic development. By granting legal recognition to community-managed lands, the system fosters stability and investment in sustainable forestry.

=== Sustainability and resilience ===
Sustainability in community forestry involves balancing ecological, social, and economic goals. Effective initiatives incorporate biodiversity conservation, sustainable harvesting practices, and equitable benefit-sharing. For example, Nepal’s community forestry programs have successfully regenerated forest areas while supporting local livelihoods, demonstrating resilience in the face of environmental and economic challenges. Projects like Mozambique’s carbon forestry initiatives also highlight the role of community forestry in enhancing resilience to climate change by promoting afforestation and reforestation efforts.

== Stakeholders ==
There are a large variety of stakeholders involved in community forestry. Stakeholders of community forestry have a vested interest in establishing sustainable practices, whether this be to develop and maintain a regular income, ensure that forests are sufficiently protected to ensure their longevity and reduce illegal activities, or to manage the area in such a way to promote tourism and conservation. Participation by stakeholders from the community, government and non-governmental organizations (NGOs) is essential in a project's success.

=== Communities and local users ===
Communities are central to community forestry, with their participation ensuring that management practices reflect local priorities. Communities may have local or indigenous knowledge that can positively influence the stewardship of forest ecosystems and resources. Interestingly, faith communities are increasingly participating in efforts to promote ecological sustainability.

==== Faith communities ====
Whereas the last 50–100 years have seen faith communities lease out their territory to industry, they are beginning to reclaim and restore their land. There have been several highly successful efforts across Cambodia, which have been extended to Vietnam and Laos. In September 2010, Buddhists monks were awarded the UNDP's Equator Prize for their ongoing conservation work. This comprises the establishment of tree nurseries, seedling distribution, ordination activities, composting schemes and a vegetable garden, which is used to promote sustainable living and conservation. The site has become a valuable source of information and environmental education as well as a base for the local community. Villagers regularly hold panel discussions about how they can go on to best take advantage of what the natural forest has to offer without destroying it.

=== Governments and institutions ===
Governments provide essential legal frameworks and resources for community forestry. For example, Indonesia’s Hutan Desa program enables communities to manage forests under state supervision, promoting conservation while addressing rural poverty. However, institutional weaknesses, such as bureaucratic delays and limited capacity, often hinder implementation.

=== NGOs and international organizations ===
NGOs and international organizations play a vital role in advocating for community rights and providing technical support. For example, in the Philippines, NGO-facilitated projects have empowered communities to restore degraded lands while generating income through agroforestry and ecotourism. FAO’s work in documenting and disseminating best practices has also been instrumental in shaping global policy and capacity-building efforts.

=== Common stakeholders ===
While specific stakeholders vary between different community forestry projects common stakeholder groups are summarized in the following table.

Common stakeholders involved with community forestry
Local community
Communities living adjacent to or within the forest
Traditional leaderships including village chief, elderly, clan heads, and spiritual leaderships
Community-based organisations including forest users groups, networks of inter-villages forest protection, etc.
Community representatives, local councils
Government
State government
National government
Departments of Agriculture, Forestry, Environment, etc.
(specific to country and/or region)
NGOs
Environmental/conservation groups
Commercial forestry industries
Industries reliant on forests
(i.e., harvestable products other than wood such as game meat)
Tourism industry
Animal welfare groups

== Management systems and theory ==
=== Management systems ===
Due to differing complex regional socio-economic and environmental contexts, there is no blueprint management plan for community forestry projects. However, some variables have been observed to affect the success of community forest management systems, grouped by one study into the following five categories:

1. attributes of the resource system,
2. attributes of the user group,
3. attributes of the governance system,
4. attributes relating to interactions between the user group and resource, and
5. attributes relating to interactions between the governance system and the resource.

It has also been suggested that community conflict within community forest management may also be mitigated by the following approach:

1. Management by smaller work groups within the community, sharing common interest in the resources.
2. A clear management plan with specific benefit sharing arrangement within the work group.
3. Develop management systems which are within the expertise of the working group.

Adaptive management has also been emphasized in community forestry literature. Participatory governance frameworks, such as Mexico’s CFEs, Nepal’s Forest User Groups, and Portugal's community forest management practices demonstrate how adaptive management can address diverse ecological and socio-economic needs. These models emphasize inclusivity, transparency, and accountability, fostering long-term success.

=== Role of incentives ===
Incentives play a crucial role in encouraging communities to participate in and sustain forestry initiatives. They can be broadly categorized into those focused on household use and those aimed at developing market-oriented forestry.

==== Household use incentives ====
Household use incentives can include the following.

1. Preserving the source of community's livelihood - Community forestry ensures the preservation of forests as vital sources of livelihood. Forests provide essential resources such as food, fuel, and construction materials while supporting agricultural productivity through soil stabilization.
2. Maintaining soil integrity by preventing erosion - Forest cover helps maintain soil integrity by reducing erosion and improving water retention, which is critical for sustaining agricultural practices and protecting local ecosystems.
3. Use of fuel wood and fodder – Planting trees to provide fuel wood as well as fodder for cattle can be encouraged in ways that do not conflict with cash crops and food production. For example, the Neem tree was introduced in West Africa and is now the most widely grown tree in the drier parts of the continent. It was easily cultivated and provides the farmers with good timber, fuel and shade.
4. Developing nursery networks - Subsidized programs that support the establishment of local nurseries encourage entrepreneurship among community members. By producing planting stock for sale, these nurseries provide economic opportunities and contribute to reforestation efforts.

==== Market incentives ====
Forestry can take on the character of agricultural production where there is a market for wood products such as poles, fuel wood and, pulp for production of paper, or where there is a market for non-timber forest products.

1. Timber and Wood Products - Community forestry initiatives often integrate tree cultivation with local and regional markets. For example, in the Philippines, over 3,000 farmers grow trees specifically for pulp production under agreements with industries. These arrangements provide a steady source of income by guaranteeing minimum prices for their products.
2. Non-timber Forest Products - Cooperatives like the Village Forestry Associations in South Korea enable communities to collectively produce and market forest products such as timber and mushrooms.

Aligning household and market incentives is central to community forestry management systems, and has potential to foster economic growth, ecological sustainability, and social cohesion.

== Benefits ==
=== Socio-economic benefits ===
Community forestry has been recognized for its potential to generate profound socio-economic benefits, particularly for marginalized, forest-dependent populations. By granting communities access and rights to forest resources, it creates opportunities for employment, income generation, and poverty alleviation.

In Nepal, Forest User Groups have enabled equitable benefit-sharing, ensuring that marginalized groups, such as women and lower-caste individuals, gain access to forest-derived incomes. These groups often reinvest revenues into community infrastructure, such as schools, water systems, and renewable energy projects, fostering broader socio-economic development.

In Mexico, community forest enterprises (CFEs) not only generate significant economic returns through timber production but also invest in local job creation, housing, and education programs. These enterprises demonstrate how sustainable resource use can contribute to regional economic stability and resilience.

In the Philippines, community-managed agroforestry projects have helped restore degraded lands while providing communities with steady incomes from crops such as coffee, cacao, and fruits. These initiatives illustrate the potential of integrating forestry with agricultural livelihoods.

=== Environmental benefits ===
Community forestry also contributes to global environmental goals including reducing deforestation, enhancing biodiversity, and promoting carbon sequestration. Reforestation initiatives in Nepal have reversed decades of forest loss, with some regions witnessing a 37% increase in forest cover under community management.

In Africa, Mozambique’s community forestry initiatives play a dual role in biodiversity conservation and climate change mitigation. By participating in carbon trading schemes, communities gain financial incentives to conserve forests, thereby reducing emissions from deforestation.

Latin America offers further evidence of environmental success, with Brazil’s co-managed forests in the Amazon acting as biodiversity hotspots while supporting sustainable livelihoods. These systems integrate local ecological knowledge with scientific management to enhance resilience against climate change and forest degradation.

== Challenges ==
Research suggests that there are still major challenges for community forestry in practice. Some of the major challenges are outlined below.

=== Governance and institutional strength ===
Governance challenges, such as bureaucratic inefficiency and lack of institutional capacity, often hinder the success of community forestry initiatives. In Mozambique, for instance, weak government oversight has led to inequitable benefit-sharing and insufficient support for capacity-building among local communities.

Additionally, existing power imbalances between community members, local elites, and external stakeholders can unintentionally be exacerbated by community forestry initiatives. For example, in the Amazon, co-management efforts have faced criticism for failing to adequately represent marginalized groups, such as women and indigenous populations, in decision-making processes.

=== Tenure and privatization ===
Tenure insecurity remains a critical obstacle in community forestry. Unclear boundaries, competing claims, and weak enforcement mechanisms can undermine the claims to ownership or management rights of local communities, leading to conflicts and resource overexploitation.

In regions like sub-Saharan Africa, tenure systems often lack legal recognition, exposing communities to risks of land commodification and privatization. For example, land grabs by private entities in Mozambique have displaced local communities, limiting their ability to engage in sustainable forestry.

To address these challenges, experts advocate for legal reforms that prioritize tenure security, enhance community rights, and establish conflict-resolution mechanisms.

=== Market access ===
Market-based mechanisms, such as certification systems or carbon credit projects, have enabled communities to access global markets for sustainable forest products or carbon sequestration. However, challenges such as high certification costs and limited market access remain barriers for smallholders.

=== Challenges in the Amazon ===
A study conducted in the Brazilian Amazon determined that there are a number of challenges that must be faced when developing a sustainable management strategy for community forestry. These challenges are outlined below. The study's model is segregated into two phases: the development phase during which several enabling factors (land ownership, organizational capacity, technical knowledge and capital) are needed to obtain a legal management permit and secondly the operational phase where factors (clandestine loggers, access to markets, infrastructure and managerial skills) influence the success of the management program. Each of the challenges outlined must be addressed in order for a self-sustaining community forestry management program to be established.

Challenges faced by stakeholders managing forests
Issue	Description
Land ownership	It is not uncommon for small settlements living traditionally to lack clear title to the forests and lands, as such their rights to harvest the land may come into dispute. Formal recognition of land ownership or rights to use is needed for legal forest management.
Organizational capacity	Organizational capacity refers to the community's competence to organize a forest management program.
Capital	A community will require start-up capital to invest in the required infrastructure, equipment, and to hire a forester to organise and oversee management plans.
Technical knowledge	While it is common for community members have a thorough understanding of forest ecology in a natural and historical sense, they often lack the technical knowledge and legal certification required to manage forest resources legally.
Regulatory obstacles	Non-forest sectors may be more profitable (e.g. agriculture, mining, tourism, real estate), and have regulated incentives making land conversion a more financially rewarding option than sustainable forest management. Regulations on forest management, on the other hand, such as forest management plans (FMPs), may be complex, costly, and difficult to develop, implement, monitor, and enforce. In addition, regulations may not consider traditional or local knowledge in promoting sustainability, making it even more difficult for forest communities to appropriate them or participate in their execution.
Legal management	Community forestry needs to be based on a legal management plan, prepared and approved by the relevant government authority (usually state environment agencies). Approval of the management plan can often be a long, bureaucratic process.
Clandestine loggers	Clandestine (illegal) loggers can enter a region and illegally log valuable species without the community's consent, and without a legal management plan. Illegal harvesting often significantly degrades the forest as few limitations are observed by the illegal loggers. Communities are either robbed of their valuable timber, or are paid below market prices.
Market access	Small villages that are often the focus of community forestry initiatives generally have limited access to markets due to their physical isolation, precarious transport and communication, limited contact with buyers and lack of marketing knowledge. Often they will also face difficulties competing with large-scale operations and illegal timber that flood the market with cheaper products.
Infrastructure	Forest management requires a certain amount of physical infrastructure, such as roads, logging equipment, buildings for storage and management headquarters and/or a reliable power supply.
Managerial skills	Skills and capacity related to effective management of the program, such as business know-how, day-to-day decision-making, marketing skills, ability to resolve internal conflicts, and ensuring community benefit sharing may be lacking in some communities.
Economic returns	The result of inadequacies in management is small and often insufficient economic returns to keep the program afloat, and furthermore to keep the community interested in the activity.

== Case studies ==
=== Indonesia ===
Indonesia’s social forestry program is an integrated forest management system primarily implemented by forest farmer groups and indigenous communities. Its goals include reducing poverty, improving community welfare, and protecting forests from degradation and land conversion.

The program offers five community forestry models: community forests, village forests, community plantation forests, forestry partnerships, and customary forests, as regulated by the Forestry Act of 1999 and the Ministry of Environment and Forestry Regulation No. 9/2021 on social forestry management. Through this program, a community representative can obtain a license to manage forests within a specified tenure.

Villagers from three communities in Bantaeng district in Indonesia, with the assistance of a funded project obtained a Forest management license and secured a 35-year lease on their local forest. With the incentive to preserve their source of income, the villagers have had a positive impact on forest conservation. This is now viewed as a reference model for the Ministry of Forestry's future projects.

=== Korea ===
Farmers enter into a profit sharing contract with the 'Village Forestry Association' (VFA) to form a cooperative which assists farmers with reforestation in keeping with the legislation. VFA, though loosely linked to the Office of Forestry enjoys a degree of autonomy facilitating community participation. This system demonstrates the desirable mix of top-down and bottom-up planning ensuring government control as well as effective reforestation through active community participation.

=== Mexico ===
Mexico’s CFEs represent one of the most successful models of community forestry, blending sustainable resource management with economic development. These enterprises emphasize local governance, sustainable practices, and reinvestment in community development. By granting communities legal ownership and management rights, the program has enabled local populations to derive economic benefits from timber and non-timber forest products while conserving biodiversity. These enterprises reinvest profits into community development, creating a cycle of sustainability.

=== Mozambique ===
Mozambique’s carbon forestry projects highlight the potential of community forestry to address climate change while generating socio-economic benefits. Communities manage reforested areas, earning carbon credits that can be traded on international markets. However, challenges such as inequitable benefit-sharing and limited technical expertise underscore the need for better governance and capacity-building.

=== Nepal ===
Common land in Nepal is owned by the state while community-based 'Forest User Groups' (FUG) manage forest resources. These groups, composed of local households, are responsible for managing designated forest areas, ensuring sustainable resource use, and distributing benefits equitably. Nepal’s programs demonstrate that community forestry can simultaneously meet ecological and socio-economic goals through decentralized management. For example, the initiative has led to significant forest regeneration, increased household incomes, and strengthened social cohesion, setting a benchmark for community forestry globally.

=== Philippines ===
In the Philippines, NGO-facilitated community forestry projects combine agroforestry with ecotourism to restore degraded landscapes and provide economic opportunities. By diversifying income sources, these projects enhance community resilience and foster long-term sustainability.

== See also ==
- Common land
- Tragedy of the commons
