= Bedford railway station =

Railway station in Bedfordshire, England

Bedford
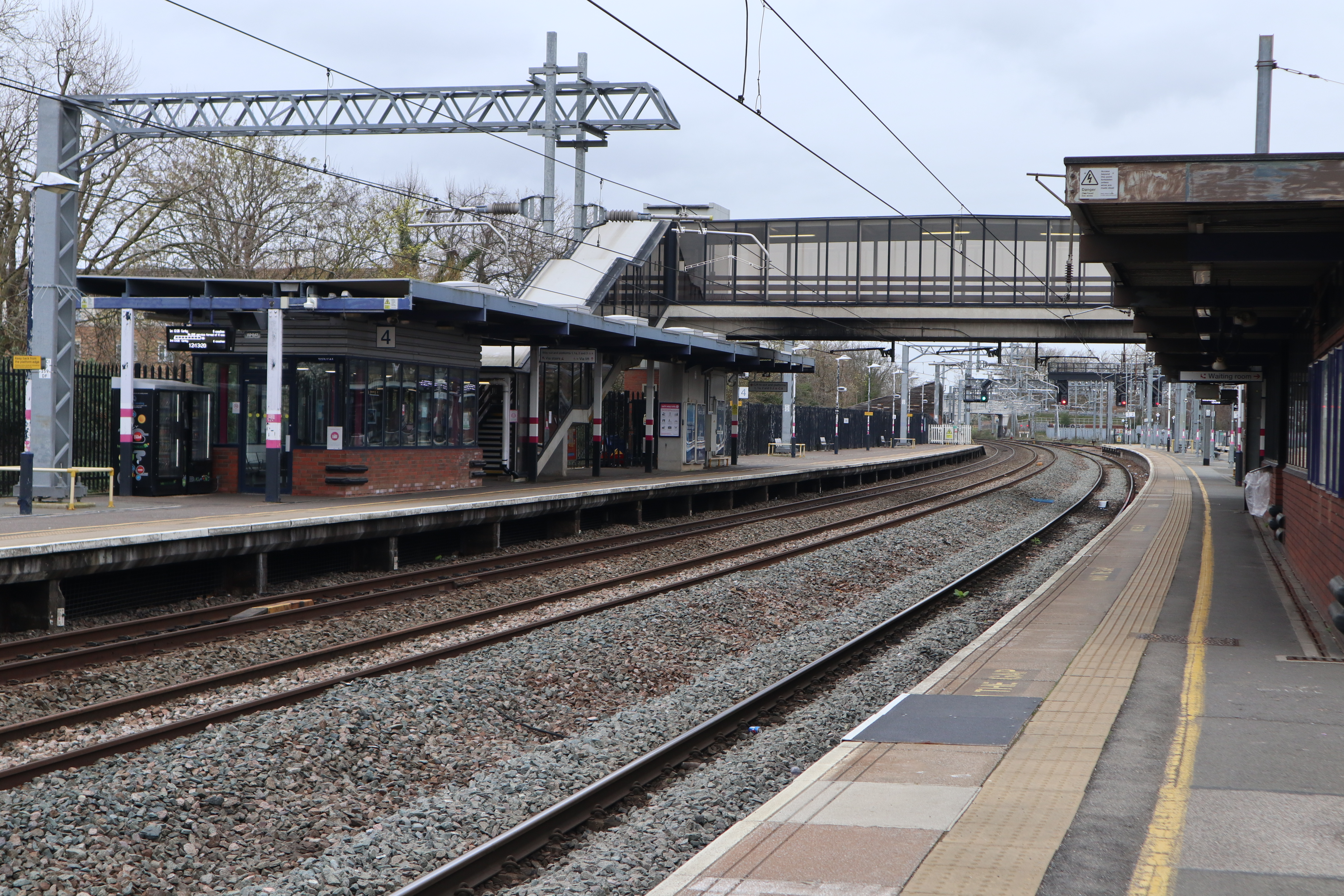
- Bedford station, looking north in March 2024

General information
- Location: Bedford, Borough of Bedford; England
- Coordinates: 52°08′11″N 00°28′46″W
- Grid reference: TL041497
- Manager: Govia Thameslink Railway
- Platforms: 5
- Tracks: 6

Other information
- Station code: BDM
- Classification: DfT category C1

History
- Original company: Midland Railway
- Pre-grouping: Midland Railway
- Post-grouping: London, Midland and Scottish Railway

Key dates
- 1 February 1859: Opened as Bedford
- 1890: Avoiding lines built
- 2 June 1924: Renamed Bedford Midland Road
- 8 May 1978: Renamed Bedford Midland
- 5 May 1988: Renamed Bedford

Passengers
- 2020/21: ▼0.837 million
- Interchange: ▼10,947
- 2021/22: ▲2.324 million
- Interchange: ▲29,922
- 2022/23: ▲3.036 million
- Interchange: ▲40,131
- 2023/24: ▲3.247 million
- Interchange: ▲41,248
- 2024/25: ▲3.764 million
- Interchange: ▲52,169
Location
Notes
- Passenger statistics from the Office of Rail and Road

Bedford railway station (formerly Bedford Midland Road and historically referred to on some signage as Bedford Midland) is the larger of two railway stations in the town of Bedford, in Bedfordshire, England. It is on the Midland Main Line, which connects London St Pancras with the East Midlands, and is the terminus of the Marston Vale line between Bletchley and Bedford St Johns.

== History ==
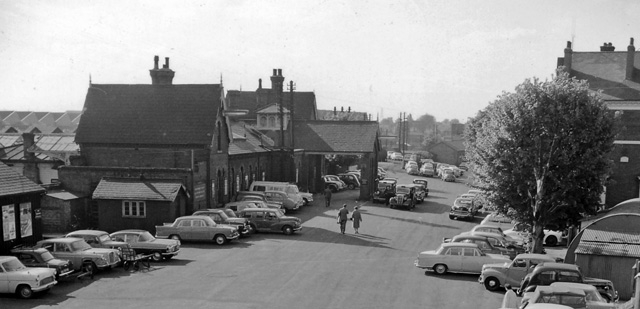
The main entrance on 4 June 1962

The original station was built by the Midland Railway in 1859 on its line to the Great Northern at Hitchin. It was on land known as "Freemen's Common", approximately 200 yards (180 m) south of the current station on Ashburnham Road.

The London and North Western Railway (LNWR) also had a station on its line between Bletchley and Cambridge. The Midland crossed it on the level and there was a serious collision when an LNWR train passed a red signal; curiously, both drivers were named John Perkins. Following this accident, the Midland built a flyover in 1885.

The extension to St Pancras opened in 1868. The connection to Hitchin ceased public services during 1961, but the line north of Bedford to Wigston Junction is still officially referred to as the Leicester to Hitchin line. At this time, the station was substantially altered, with the replacement of a level crossing by the Queen's Park overbridge. In 1890, fast lines were added to the west to allow expresses to bypass the station.

Serious damage occurred during World War II when a bomb destroyed the booking hall's glass ceiling. The current station was built to replace it and was opened by Sir Peter Parker (chairman of BR) on 9 October 1978. The £1 million station, which was resited about 110 yards (100 m) north of the original 1857 station, had a large square concourse housing a ticket office, travel centre and Travellers Fare buffet. The station car park was enlarged to cater for 450 cars plus 52 short-wait spaces in the forecourt which had separate areas for cars and taxis to set down and pick up passengers. A covered walkway linked the station with bus stops in Ashburnham Road. As part of the modernisation work, the slow lines were realigned to the west next to the 1890 fast lines to pass between two new platforms.

Although the intention was for what remained of the old awnings to be transferred to the Midland Railway at Butterley in Derbyshire, it proved impossible to save them. Nothing remains of the original station buildings.

Services over the Marston Vale line to/from Bletchley were transferred here from the old LNWR St Johns station in May 1984. A new connection, which runs along the formation formerly used by the abandoned line to Hitchin (closed to passenger traffic from 1 January 1962 and completely three years later), was laid from the Marston Vale branch up to the main line to permit this. The original St Johns station closed on 14 May 1984, with a replacement halt on the new chord opening the same day. Bletchley trains henceforth used a bay platform (numbered 1A) on the eastern side of the station.

By 1983, Midland Main Line electrification under British Rail reached Bedford and Class 317 electric multiple units began running to Moorgate. The track through platform 4 towards the East Midlands remained unelectrified until the 2020s Midland Main Line railway upgrade.

== Facilities ==
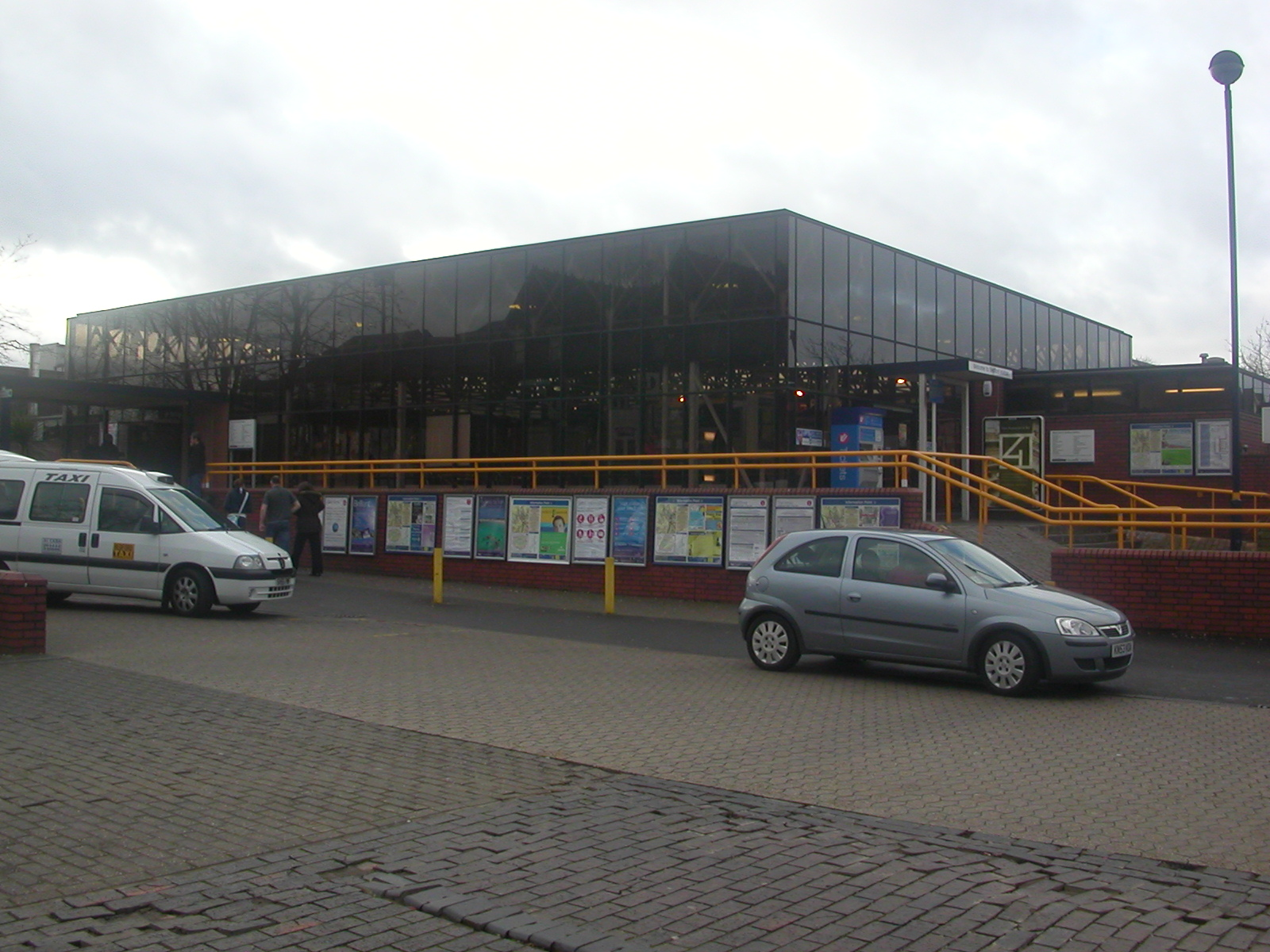
The main entrance on 13 January 2007 from the car park.

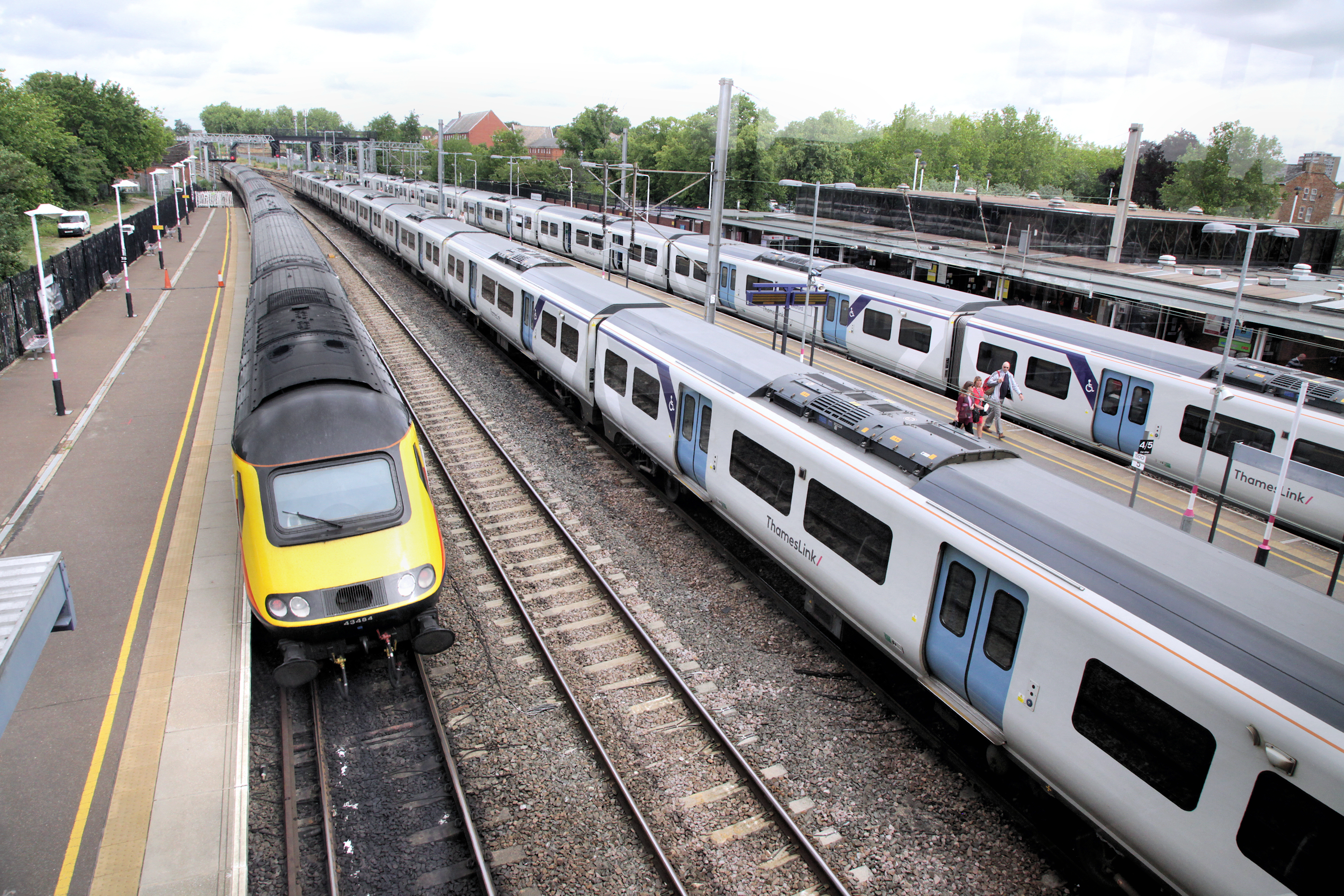
A view from the station footbridge, looking north. An East Midlands Railway High-Speed Train is leaving platform 4, heading north

The station has the following facilities:

- Two waiting rooms
- Cafe/newsagent/bar and coffee bar
- Telephones
- Post box
- ATM
- Ticket machines
- Toilets
- Car park
- Fully wheelchair accessible
- Ticket barriers

It lies in the Bedford zone of the PlusBus scheme, where train and bus tickets can be bought together to save money.

== Services ==
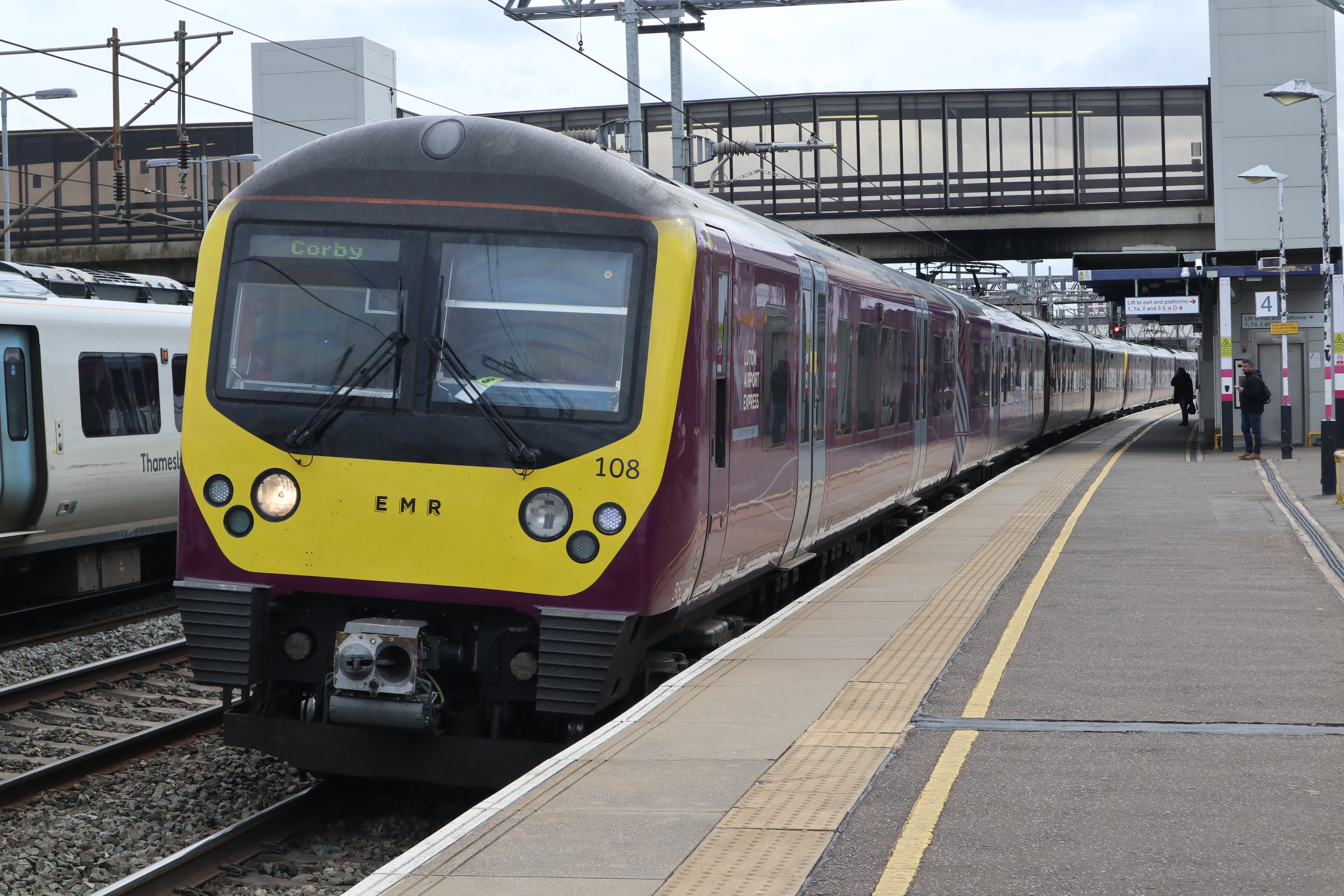
An East Midlands Railway Class 360 at Bedford in March 2024 with a service to Corby

The station is served by three train operating companies:

- East Midlands Railway operates services that call at Bedford under the Luton Airport Express brand. This service started in May 2021 as EMR Connect and is operated by Class 360 electric multiple units running on the twice hourly stopping service from London St Pancras to Corby. Occasional inter-city services call at Bedford during peak hours and on Sunday mornings to Leicester and Nottingham without requiring a connection at Kettering.
- Govia Thameslink Railway operates most services to Bedford, using the Thameslink route. The station is the northern terminus with services operating to Brighton, via St Albans City and London Blackfriars. Services from the station also call at Luton Airport Parkway and Gatwick Airport. Additional services start or terminate at Gatwick Airport or Three Bridges. Thameslink also runs a few services a day to Sutton on the Sutton Loop Line, via both Wimbledon and Mitcham Junction.
- London Northwestern Railway operates local services to Bletchley via the Marston Vale line. There is no Sunday service on this line.

The typical off-peak service in trains per hour is:

- 2tph to Brighton via Gatwick Airport (Govia Thameslink Railway)
- 2tph to Three Bridges via Redhill (Govia Thameslink Railway)
- 2tph to London St Pancras (East Midlands Railway)
- 2tph to Corby (East Midlands Railway)
- 1tph to Bletchley (London Northwestern Railway)

Preceding station	National Rail	Following station
Wellingborough	East Midlands Railway London to Corby Connect	Luton
Terminus	Thameslink Thameslink	Flitwick
Bedford St Johns towards Bletchley	London Northwestern Railway Marston Vale Line Monday–Saturday only	Terminus
	Disused railways	
Terminus	London, Midland and Scottish Railway Bedford–Hitchin line	Cardington Line and station closed
Turvey Line and station closed	London, Midland and Scottish Railway Bedford–Northampton line	Terminus
	Historical railways	
Oakley Line open, station closed	Midland Railway Midland Main Line	Ampthill Line open, station closed
	Future Services	
Bedford St Johns	East West Rail Oxford to Cambridge	Tempsford

== Community Rail Partnership ==
In common with other stations on the Marston Vale line, Bedford station is covered by the Marston Vale Community Rail Partnership. It aims to increase use of the Marston Vale line by getting local people involved with their local line.

A second CRP with Bedford Midland as its northern terminus - the Beds & Herts Community Rail Partnership (formerly the Bedford to St Albans City Community Rail Partnership) - has been set up, covering the eight stations on the Midland Main Line between Bedford Midland and St Albans City

== Future developments ==
The station will be the eastern terminus for Phase 2 of East West Rail, a plan to reopen the railway between Oxford and Cambridge. As of April 2025, extension to Cambridge via "a new station in the Tempsford area" is planned but not scheduled. According to the East West Rail Company, tracks will need to be laid through and to the north of the station; if approved, this will require compulsory acquisition of all or part of 66 properties on the northern approach.
