= Sir Herbert Leon Academy =

Academy in Milton Keynes, England

Location
- Fern Grove; Bletchley, Milton Keynes, MK2 3HQ; England; 51°58′49″N 0°43′39″W

Information
- Type: Academy
- Motto: "Find your remarkable"
- Established: 1890; 136 years ago
- Department for Education URN: 138439 Tables
- Ofsted: Reports
- Chair of Trustees: David Hall
- Headteacher: Emma Jordan
- Gender: Coeducational
- Age range: 11-16
- Enrolment: 652 (2024)
- Capacity: 984
- Houses: Ruby; Amber; Emerald; Sapphire
- Colours: Azure, Blue and White
- Website: http://www.shlacademy.org/

Sir Herbert Leon Academy (formerly Leon School and Sports College) is a coeducational comprehensive secondary academy school and sixth form located in Bletchley, Milton Keynes, England. It is currently sponsored by the Academies Enterprise Trust, having become an academy under this sponsorship. Originally founded as two separate boys and girls schools on Bletchley Road (Queensway), the schools unified as a coeducational senior school in 1937. In the 1960s it was renamed to Leon Secondary School, in honour of Sir Herbert Leon, and relocated to Fern Grove in 1971, becoming a comprehensive. The school specialised and became the Leon School and Sports College sometime between 1996 and 2001, and academized as Sir Herbert Leon Academy in 2012. Between 2011 and 2014, the school hosted one of two campuses for the Milton Keynes South Sixth Form, in collaboration with nearby Lord Grey School.

Currently the school is graded as requires improvement by OFSTED, previously being inadequate. Furthermore, it is one of the 100 schools identified by OFSTED as having dropped an OFSTED grade since becoming an academy, previously being graded as good when it was a specialist school and sports college. Of the school's students a third are ethnic minorities, 30.5% speak English non-natively, 50.4% are boys and 49.6% are girls. Overall, there are 538 students on roll (as of December 2021). The school is located in the Lakes Estate, which, according to the multiple deprivation index, was one of the "top 10 most deprived areas in England for crime, income and health deprivation" in 2015. Alongside the Lakes Estate, it is the main secondary school for Fenny Stratford and East and South Bletchley.

== History ==
=== Early years (1890-1971) ===
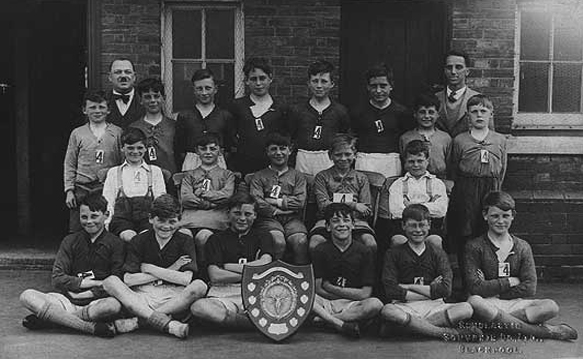
Bletchley Road Senior School athletics team. Headmaster Cook is on the rear far-left.

In 1890 a new school was built on Bletchley Road (now known as Queensway) in order to accommodate the increasing population of Bletchley. The school's campus hosted the relocation of multiple national schools located on the town's then high street, including an infant school, girls school and boys school. Together on this site the schools were known as the Bletchley Road Schools. In 1937 the schools were reorganised into an infants school, county junior school and a coeducational county senior school. The senior school's headmaster was E. C. Cook, who retired in 1953.

By the 1960s the senior school was known as the Bletchley Road Secondary Modern School and in the early 1960s it was renamed to the Leon Secondary School after Sir Herbert Leon. The school during this period is often known as "Old Leon". After the new Lakes Estate was built the school relocated to its current Fern Grove site, replacing the Lakes Secondary School and being renamed to the Leon Comprehensive School. The relocated school opened its doors on March 10, 1971. It was opened by John Ganzoni, 2nd Baron Belstead.

=== Leon School (1971-2012) ===
After its opening in 1971, the Leon Comprehensive was led by Headmaster David B. Bradshaw. The school was segmented between a lower school and upper school. By the 1980s the school had a sixth form and Bradshaw was no longer head, being succeeded by Bruce Henry Abbott. The sixth form would be shared between a variety of local schools including Leon, due to its unsustainability.

Between 1996 and 2001 the school experienced a variety of challenges including temporary closure caused by asbestos removal, a period of time without a headteacher and repeated failure to recruit teaching staff. During this time the school specialised as a sports college, becoming Leon School and Sports College. By 2001 the school had finally found a headteacher, Stephen Pam, and in the same year OFSTED inspected the school. The school's standards were reported as being "still well below average" but OFSTED praised its progress since 1996, categorising it as an "improving school". The school's sixth form was graded as "satisfactory", with students "achieving well". At this time the school served 12-19 year olds, with year 7 being excluded from education.

In 2004 Grays School Deputy Head Simon Viccars joined Leon, replacing Stephen Pam as headteacher. In 2007 the school was graded with a 4 by OFSTED, making the school inadequate. Leon partnered with Lord Grey School in 2011 to create the new Milton Keynes South Sixth Form and it was graded as good by Ofsted in June of that year.

In 2012 Headteacher Viccars led the school's academisation process under the sponsorship of the Academies Enterprise Trust. As part of the process the school launched a new house system, changed its uniform to black blazers and requested ideas for a new name. One of the names offered and discussed by the school's governing body was "Hogwarts Academy". Eventually it was decided that the academy school would be named "Sir Herbert Leon Academy" in order to both pay homage to the school's past and its hopeful future. The school successfully academized in September 2012. By this time the school was categorised as good by OFSTED.

=== Sir Herbert Leon Academy (2012-present) ===
Upon academisation Simon Viccars retained his role as headteacher, now as the principal. He died in 2013. After his death a new executive principal, Jane Herriman, began overseeing the school. An acting principal, Dan Sim, was also appointed from January 2014. Ofsted judged the school to require improvement later that year. Herriman would resign from her post as executive principal after her school (The Duston School) left the Academies Enterprise Trust on March 1, 2015. She was replaced by Gill Salver in April 2015 with Doctor Jo Trevenna becoming head of school. In 2016 the school went into special measures but left in 2018, now requiring improvement. Trevenna left the school by 2020 and was replaced by Jonathan Harris, who left in 2022 and has since been replaced by Emma Orr. Salver has also left the school.

== Academic standards ==
5GCSES A-C (including English and maths) taken from School and College Performance Tables accurate as of December 2015
Academy Name	Joined AET	Left AET	2011	2012	2013	2014	2015	OFSTED Grade	DfE Warning or Pre Warning
Sir Herbert Leon Academy	12 Sep		32%	39%	49%	25%	18%	Inadequate	19 December 2014
National Maintained Schools			59%	59%	60%	57%	56%		

Cells coloured red represent 5 GCSE A-C (including English and maths) results which are below the minimum standards expected by the Government floor target, or an OFSTED grade which indicate standards need to be improved or a Department for Education letter which states that standards are 'unacceptably low' at the academy. Cells in darker grey indicate data for a period of time in which the academy was not part of the Academies Enterprise Trust network.

In 2014 OFSTED commented on standards stating

Students, particularly the most able, have not reached the standards they are capable of, particularly in mathematics... Students’ GCSE examination results have not been good in a range of subjects, including science, humanities, and design and technology.

Commenting after the 2014 exam results, Martin Post, the DfE School's Commissioner said

the Secretary of State considers that the standards of performance at Sir Herbert Leon Academy are unacceptably low and likely to remain so... The results are significantly lower than the national averages. They are also lower than the 2013 results and lower than results at the school that preceded the academy.

Since that criticism of the 'unacceptably low standards' at Sir Herbert Leon academy; results in 2015 got worse, as the table above show. The Academy cites its own summer 2015 exam results as slightly higher than the data above, taken from the DfE statistical first release, as the Academy states that 19.6% of students gained 5GCSEs A-C (including English and Maths). However even that figure represents a worsening of standards from the previous year. The Academy also recognised that those exam results were not good enough as it includes the need to improve in its key values statement which reads as follows

At Sir Herbert Leon Academy we are continuously seeking improvement. We focus on excellence...

In 2014 Sir Herbert Leon Academy began offering A levels for the first time. OFSTED stated about sixth form standards

The sixth form requires improvement because not enough students make good progress in all the subjects they study. They do best in work related subjects.

Previously sixth form education was offered in collaboration with Lord Grey School. Titled "Milton Keynes South Sixth Form", and qualifications were taught over both school sites. The opening of the Sixth Form coincided with the period of time in which GCSE exam results at Sir Herbert Leon fell below the minimum standards expected by the Government. Sir Herbert Leon Academy summed up results in 2015 by stating that

Many students at Sir Herbert Leon Academy achieved the top GCSE grades in English and Maths. However, we know that the academy still has a great deal of work to do if we are to ensure that we make required improvements.

However, as of 2022, the school has since decided to stop the sixth form after it was paused in 2021 due to low student numbers and choosing to focus more on the students in years 7-11 although people can still get sixth form education by going to other local providers such as Milton Keynes College, Lord Grey Academy or Walton High School.

== Sponsor support for the Academy ==
Academies Enterprise Trust support for academies at the local level is led by the AET Regional Director of Education (known as a RDE). The 2014 OFSTED report about AET explained that ‘some academy leaders said that there was too much variability in the support and challenge offered by Regional Directors employed by AET.'.

Since 2013 the AET Regional Director of Education at Sir Herbert Leon Academy has been Richard Bassett. He was also a member of the Management Board in 2014 and 2015, which replaced the previous Governing Body. Since 2014, the Chair of the Management board raising standards at Sir Leon Academy has been Louise Soden.

Commenting on the support provided by the Sponsor when Sir Herbert Leon Academy was supported by Jane Herriman and her Outstanding Academy The Duston School, OFSTED wrote:

The academy sponsor, through the appointment of the Executive Principal, has ensured that the academy has robust monitoring and the access to a wide range of additional expertise from her outstanding school... The academy sponsor plans to establish a management board to maintain the pace of change and increase the level of challenge, so further strengthening the good quality leadership and management.

However The Duston School carried out a parental ballot and chose to leave the Academies Enterprise Trust network on 1 March 2015. The Duston School originally wanted to retain its link to Sir Herbert Leon Academy but AET did not support the proposal

Martin Post, the DfE Regional School's Commissioner criticised the Sponsor, Academies Enterprise Trust because

1. The sponsor has not presented a clear enough picture of how it proposes to support the academy. 2. There is not enough clarity about the future leadership of the academy and the other partners providing support to the academy beyond the short term: 3. The academy development plan does not sufficiently focus on how the achievement for all pupils at Sir Herbert Leon will be improved and sustained in the longer term.

== Headteachers ==
- E. C. Cook (1937-1953)
- David B. Bradshaw (1970s)
- Bruce Henry Abbott (1980s)
- Stephen Pam (early 2000s-2004)
- Simon Viccars (2004-2013)
- Jane Herriman (executive 2013-2015)
- Dan Sim (acting 2014-2015)
- Gill Salver (executive 2015-2016)
- Jo Trevenna (2015-2020)
- Jonathan Harris (2020–2022)
- Emma Orr (2022–Present)
