= Newton Leys =

District of Milton Keynes, England

Coordinates: 51.975°N 0.737°W

- Location within Buckinghamshire
- Interactive map of Newton Leys
- Civil parish: Stoke Hammond; Bletchley and Fenny Stratford
- Unitary authority: Buckinghamshire; City of Milton Keynes
- Ceremonial county: Buckinghamshire
- Region: South East
- Country: England
- Sovereign state: United Kingdom
- Post town: MILTON KEYNES
- Postcode district: MK3 5
- Dialling code: 01908
- Police: Thames Valley
- Fire: Buckinghamshire
- Ambulance: South Central
- UK Parliament: Buckingham and Bletchley
- Website: www.newtonleys.org.uk

Newton Leys is an area that covers the southern tip of Bletchley (a constituent town of Milton Keynes) and straddles the boundary between the City of Milton Keynes and the rest of Buckinghamshire. The larger fraction of Newton Leys lies within Milton Keynes and forms a part of Bletchley and Fenny Stratford civil parish. It is separated from central Bletchley, Water Eaton and the Lakes Estate by the West Coast Main Line. The remaining fraction of Newton Leys lies within the (former) Aylesbury Vale district and forms a part of the Stoke Hammond civil parish, although the village of Stoke Hammond is situated on the other side of the A4146

Newton Leys within Milton Keynes is a brownfield development and within the Buckinghamshire Council area is greenfield. The full district covers some 104 hectares (260 acres) and comprises development land with housing for up to 1650 homes with employment areas, shops, a school, community facilities, new park, hotel, a care home and leisure facilities built on two former brickworks and farmland. The site is being developed by Taylor Wimpey. Houses have been built at the development by Taylor Wimpey South Midlands, Taylor Wimpey North Thames, Persimmon, and Bovis Homes Group.

The development area sits next to a man-made lake created from the brick making industry, a claypit was flooded to form Jubilee Lake, which has since become known as Willow Lake. The lakes at Newton Leys form part of a sustainable drainage system/balancing lake system designed to manage excess water caused by heavy or prolonged rainfall. Jubilee Brooks runs through the centre of the development, which rises north of Drayton Parslow and flows through the settlement towards the West Coast Mainline passing through to the Lakes Estate where it joins with the Water Eaton Brook, eventually flowing into the River Ouzel.

Newton Leys is bordered by the A4146, the Bletchley Landfill Site operated by FCC Environment, Blue Lagoon Local Nature Reserve, Newton Longville and Stoke Hammond. The Oxford–Bletchley railway line runs along the northern border of the site, whilst the West Coast Main Line runs to the east of the site.

== History of the site ==
The Bletchley area is rich in Oxford Clay, which has long been used for bricks. Brick-making has taken place on the Newton Leys site and the surrounding area from the late 19th century, circa 1897. The brickworks were named Newton Longville Brickworks and were made up of two sites – Jubilee Brickworks which was located on what is now the south of the Newton Leys site, and Bletchley Works which was in the northwest corner of the development site, adjacent to the Oxford–Bletchley railway line.

Jubilee Brickworks closed in 1978 and has since been used as farming land for the adjacent Slad Farm. The lake formed by clay extraction at this site was used by anglers for many years and was known as Jubilee Pit. The developer has since renamed it Willow Lake. Phase 1, 2 & 3 of the Newton Leys development is in this part of the site.

Bletchley Brickworks closed in September 1990 and was planned to be used as landfill, initially by London Brick Landfill, a division of the brick-making company which owned the site, and was subsequently bought out by Shanks & McEwan. Permission was granted in 2002, and the landfill site has been operated since 2004 by FCC Environment. The original claypits (Fletton Pit, Water Eaton Pit) for the Bletchley Works closed in 1970 and have since become the Blue Lagoon Local Nature Reserve.

In 1991, a plans to develop the unused parts of the brickworks and the adjoining farmland they owned at Slad Farm were created by The London Brick Company with input from Aylesbury Vale District Council, Buckinghamshire County Council, Milton Keynes City Council, and Milton Keynes Development Corporation. Outline planning permission was granted in June 2006, and development is expected to be complete by 2021.

=== Iron Age History ===
Parts of the site have a history going back as far as the Iron Age, an archaeological evaluation commissioned by the developer in 2006, found an area of occupation in the floor of a stream valley in the southern part of the site, just west of Willow Lake. This comprised at least one circular enclosure interpreted as either a roundhouse or stock enclosure, and a series of ditches, gullies and small pits and postholes as well as several spreads of occupation deposits including a significant find of Iron Age pottery.

=== Newton Longville Brickworks ===
Newton Longville Brickworks were located on land between Bletchley and Newton Longville and were made up of two sites – Jubilee Brickworks and Bletchley Works. Brick-making started onsite circa 1890s and ceased within 100 years. As noted below, both works have been demolished and their sites subsequently redeveloped as Newton Leys. Nothing remains of the original structures.

==== Jubilee Brickworks ====
Jubilee Brickworks closed in 1978 and was mainly used as farming land for the adjacent Slad Farm. The lake formed in the claypit at this site was used by anglers for many years and was known as Jubilee Pit. The lake is now known as Willow Lake.

==== Bletchley Brickworks ====
Bletchley Brickworks closed in September 1990 and was proposed for reuse as landfill, initially by London Brick Landfill and subsequently by Shanks & McEwan. Permission was granted in 2002 and the site has been operated since 2004 by FCC Environment. The original claypits (Fletton Pit, Water Eaton Pit) for the Bletchley Works closed in 1970 and have since become the Blue Lagoon Local Nature Reserve.
