= Milton Keynes urban area =

Settlement in Buckinghamshire, England

Coordinates: 52.047°N 0.744°W

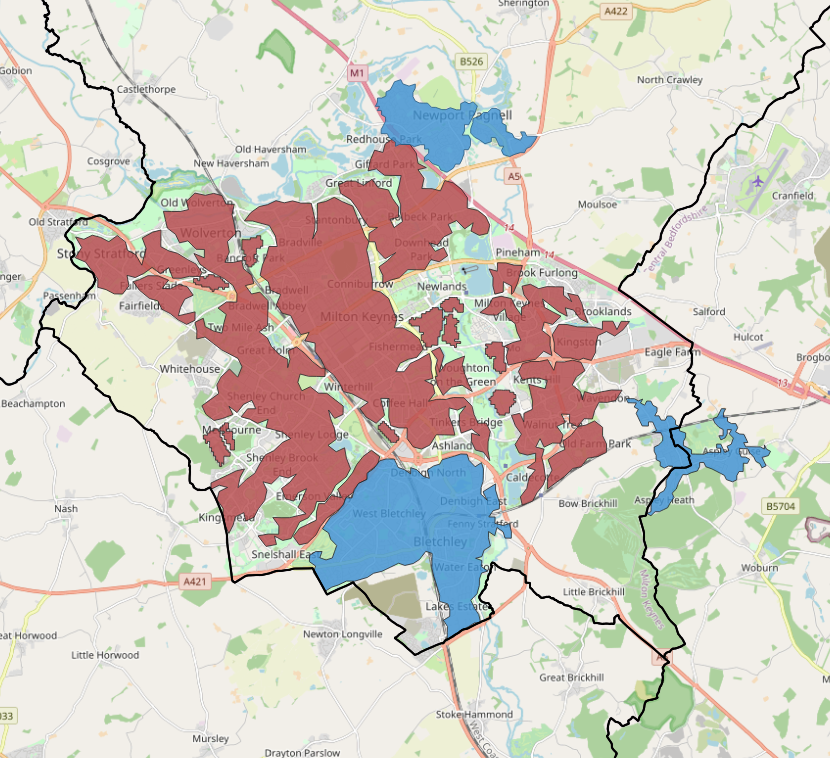
Milton Keynes Built-up area and its subdivisions (2011 definitions)

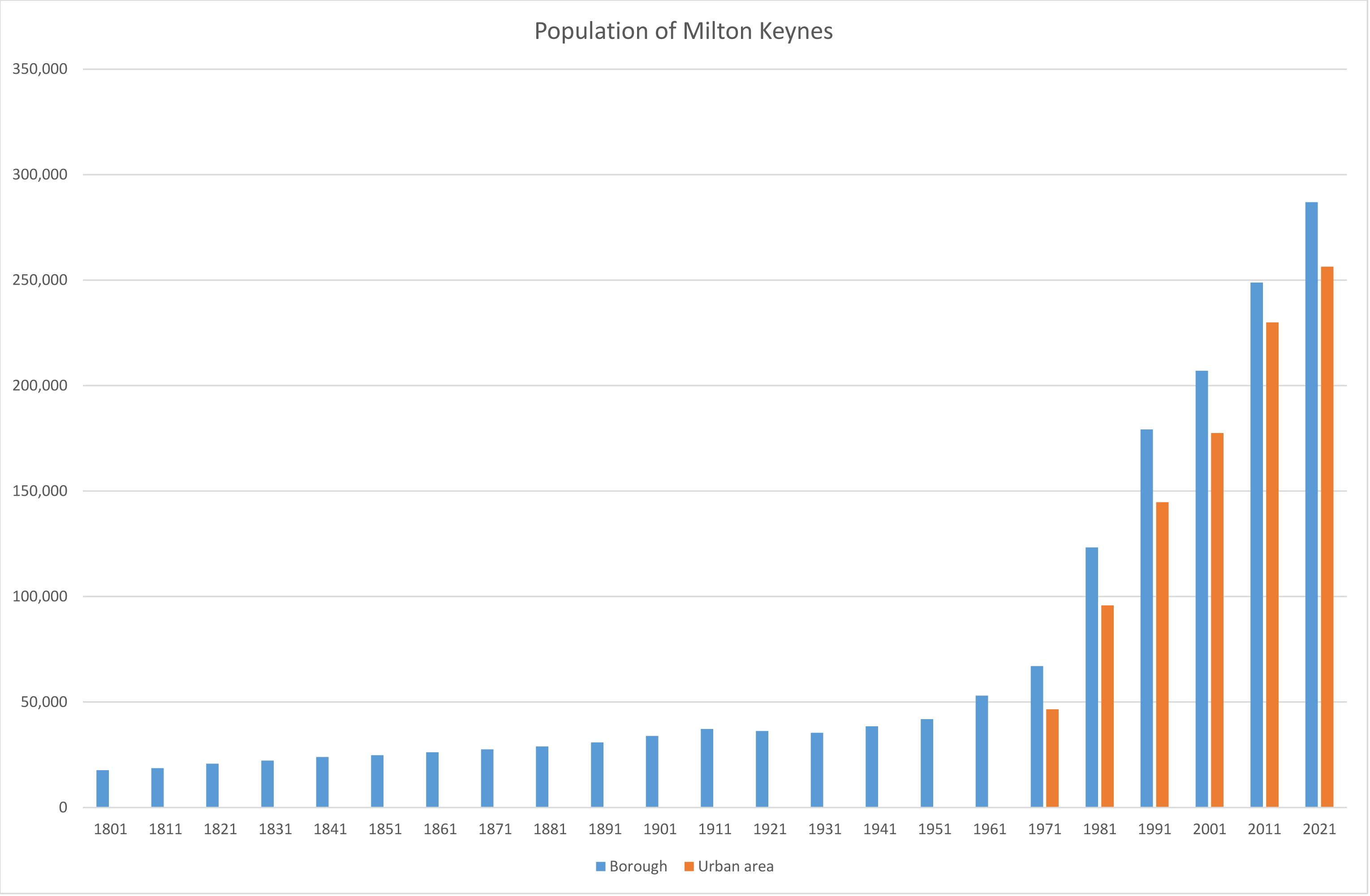
Population trend of Borough and Urban Area 1801–2021

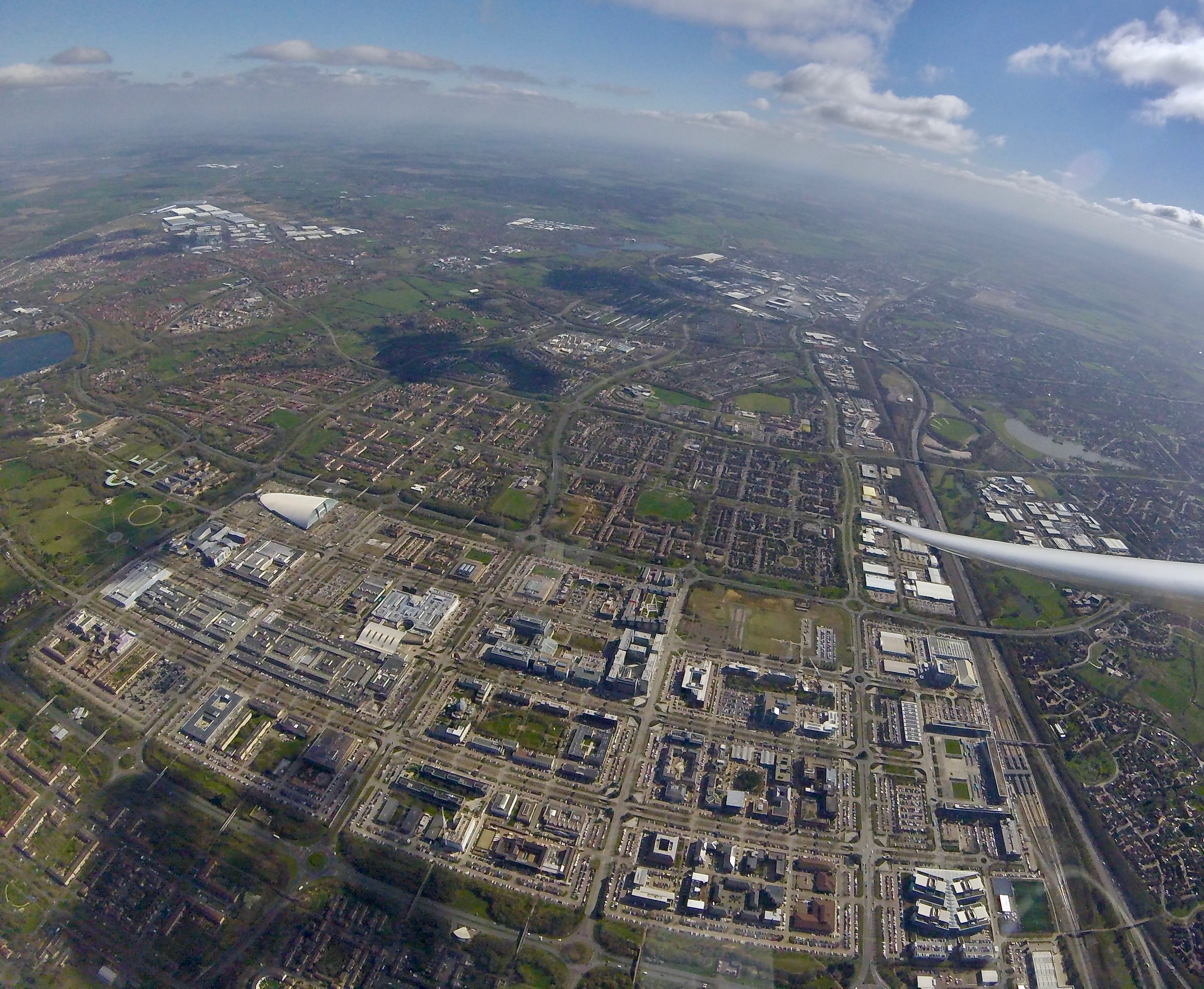
Central Milton Keynes from the air, looking south. The West Coast Main Line and the A5 mark the right of the picture, Campbell Park and Willen Lake are to the left. Stadium MK and Bletchley are at the top of the picture.

The Milton Keynes urban area or Milton Keynes Built-up Area is a designation established by the United Kingdom's Office for National Statistics. (Note: For the ONS definition of a 'built-up area' or 'urban area', see List of urban areas in the United Kingdom#Definition) Milton Keynes has no statutory boundary: the 1967 designated area only determined the area assigned to the Milton Keynes Development Corporation for development. The wider urban area outside that designation includes Newport Pagnell and Woburn Sands as well as Aspley Guise (Bedfordshire) and part of Stoke Hammond civil parish.

At the 2021 census, the population of Milton Keynes's Built-up Area was 264,349, an increase of 11.5% over the figure of 229,941 recorded at the 2011 census. That in turn was an increase of almost 25% on the population recorded in the 2001 census of 184,506.

== Built-up area sub-divisions ==
These are the 'built-up area subdivisions' of the Milton Keynes urban area (built-up area) as defined by the ONS.

=== 2021 ===
For its reports on the 2021 Census, the ONS uses the term "Amalgamated Built-up Area" for urban areas. Its ABuA for Milton Keynes, number 2987, comprises these contiguous built-up areas:

| GSS code | Subdivision | Population | Notes |
|---|---|---|---|
| E63003858 | "Milton Keynes" | 197,340 | The ONS has used the name "Milton Keynes" for a sub-area of the city, being the remainder of its total built-up area after subtracting the other named components. This is despite Bletchley being included within the boundary set out in the 1967 Order that established the city. On the other hand, it does include areas that are outside the designated area boundary. |
| E63003960 | Bletchley | 45,010 | |
| E63003760 | Newport Pagnell | 15,250 | |
| E63003911 | Woburn Sands | 4,310 | |
| E63003915 | Aspley Guise | 2,115 | Aspley Guise, like part of Woburn Sands, is in Bedfordshire and not City of Milton Keynes but is included in the urban area because there is a continuous ribbon of development across the county line. |
| E63003891 | Wavendon | 315 | The ONS has not provided any explanation for creating this as a separate sub-area, despite it being not separated in any evident way from Wavendon Gate. |
| Total | Milton Keynes urban area | 264,340 | |

=== 2011 ===
| GSS code | Subdivision | Population (2011 census) | Notes |
|---|---|---|---|
| E35001516 | "Milton Keynes" | 171,750 | This figure is for the remainder of Milton Keynes after deducting Bletchley, which has been part of the city since its designation in 1967. The ONS does not give any reason for having done this. Also includes Wavendon, which is outside the designated area of Milton Keynes. |
| E35000902 | "Bletchley" | 37,114 | Civil parishes of Bletchley and Fenny Stratford and West Bletchley |
| E35001223 | Newport Pagnell | 15,118 | |
| E35000347 | Woburn Sands | 5,959 | Includes the villages of Aspley Guise and Aspley Heath in Bedfordshire, which lie outside the City of Milton Keynes (and Buckinghamshire) |
| E34005056 | Milton Keynes urban area | 229,941 | |

=== 2001 ===
In defining the sub-areas of the Milton Keynes urban area for the 2001 census, the ONS used the pre-designation urban and rural districts, subdividing the larger rural district by the chronological phases of urbanisation within them. (These designations were largely dropped for the 2011 Census.) These were:

- Bletchley Urban District
- Wolverton Urban District
- Newport Pagnell Urban District
- Newport Pagnell Rural District

The Central and North Milton Keynes enumeration districts covered that part of the former Newport Pagnell Rural District that is west of the River Ouzel. The "Walnut Tree" and "Browns Wood" sub-areas together cover the remainder of the Rural District from the Ouzel to the M1. The areas covered by these names are far larger than the civil parishes of the same name, except for 'North Milton Keynes', which does not exist otherwise. (The precise boundary mapping is no longer available: the information in the notes below was derived at the time.)

The corresponding 2001 Urban Sub-areas were:

| Subdivision | Population (2001 census) | Notes |
|---|---|---|
| Bletchley | 47,176 | approximates to the boundaries of the former Bletchley Urban District Council at the time of the designation of Milton Keynes. In outline, the ONS Sub-area consisted of Bletchley and Fenny Stratford Civil Parish, West Bletchley Civil Parish and part of Shenley Brook End Civil Parish (specifically Furzton, Emerson Valley, Tattenhoe and Snelshall) making it rather larger than the commonly understood boundaries of Bletchley. |
| Browns Wood | 4,225 | This area covered approximately the districts within an area bounded by the Ouzel, Bletcham Way, the former A5130, and the Marston Vale line. (The area concerned is substantially larger than the Browns Wood grid-square in Walton CP.) |
| Central Milton Keynes | 31,442 | The Central Milton Keynes urban sub-area covered an area far larger than Central Milton Keynes civil parish. |
| Newport Pagnell | 14,739 | This sub-area is the same as that of the former Newport Pagnell urban district, excluding any part west of the M1 Motorway (which the ONS allocated to the "North Milton Keynes" sub-area). |
| North Milton Keynes | 13,489 | The North Milton Keynes urban sub-area consisted of the modern part of Bradwell, Rooksley, half of Bradwell Common, Linford Wood, half of Downs Barn, Downhead Park, Willen and Tongwell. |
| Walnut Tree | 12,526 | This area covered approximately the districts within an area bounded by the River Ouzel, Standing Way, the former A5130, and Bletcham Way. (Walnut Tree is a (substantially smaller) neighbourhood of Walton CP.) |
| Wolverton and Stony Stratford | 60,359 | This area approximated to that of the former Wolverton Urban District and included Stony Stratford CP, Wolverton and Greenleys CP, New Bradwell CP, Stantonbury CP, and part of Great Linford CP. |
| Total | 184,506 | |

At that time, Woburn Sands was not contiguous with the rest of the urban area and thus is not included. Its population was 4,963. (Note: page 31)
