= Herbert Leon =

English financier and politician (1850–1926)

Sir Herbert Leon Bt
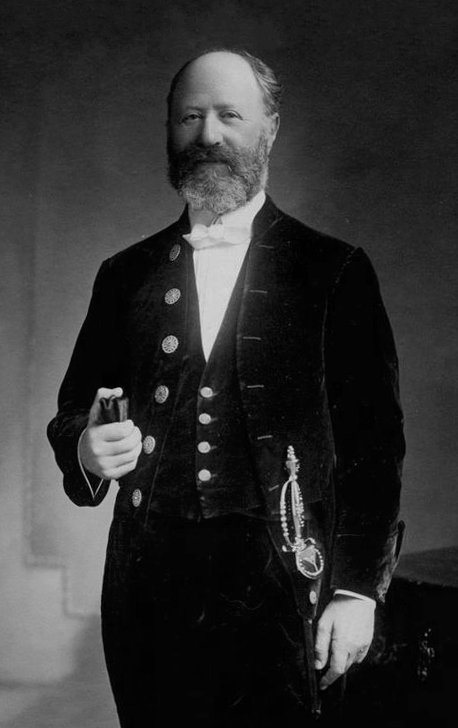

Member of Parliament for Buckingham
- In office 1891 – 7 August 1895
- Preceded by: Sir Edmund Verney
- Succeeded by: William Carlile

Personal details
- Born: Herbert Samuel Leon; 11 February 1850
- Died: 23 July 1926 (aged 76)
- Party: Liberal Party
- Spouse(s): First Wife Esther Julia Beddington (1873–1875, died); Fanny Leon, née Higham (1878–1937)
- Children: George Leon; Mabel Leon
- Parents: George Isaac Leon (father); Julia Ann Samuel (mother)
- Occupation: Financer and Liberal Party politician
- Profession: Financer, politician
- Website: http://www.mkheritage.co.uk

Sir Herbert Samuel Leon, 1st Baronet (11 February 1850 – 23 July 1926) was an English financier and politician, now best known as the main figure in the development of the Bletchley Park estate in Buckinghamshire.

== Life ==
He was the second son of George Isaac Leon, a stockbroker of Jewish descent, and Julia Ann Samuel. He was elected as the Member of Parliament (MP) for Buckingham at an 1891 by-election, after his predecessor Sir Edmund Verney had been expelled from the House of Commons. He was re-elected in 1892, but was defeated at the 1895 general election. He stood for Parliament one more time, when he was unsuccessful at the 1906 general election in Handsworth division of Staffordshire.

He served as High Sheriff of Buckinghamshire in 1909 and was created a baronet in the 1911 Coronation honours.

Over the years Leon acquired many plots of land, which he donated for public and educational uses. Leon gave the land, now known as Leon Recreational Ground, to the local council to become a public park for the youth of Fenny Stratford and Bletchley. He also donated other plots of land in the south of Bletchley for them to become public schools for the local children of the Lakes Estate.

Leon was Chairman of the Rationalist Press Association from 1913 until 1922.

== Legacy ==
In 1970 Leon School and Sports College was built on the Lakes Estate in Bletchley in Leon's honour. In September 2012 the school was renamed as Sir Herbert Leon Academy as a sign of appreciation for the works and funding Leon and his late wife had brought to the local area.

The actor John Standing, the author, Simon Sebag-Montefiore, Olympic athlete Sir Lancelot Royle, Anthony, Lord Fanshawe and Timothy Royle are descendants.

Coat of arms of Herbert Leon

Crest
Issuant from a mural crown Or a demi-lion Gules grasping in the paws a sunflower leaved and slipped Or seeded Sable.
Escutcheon
Gules two sunflowers erect slipped leaved and eradicated Or seeded Sable.
Motto
Seek The Truth

Parliament of the United Kingdom
| Preceded by Sir Edmund Verney, Bt | Member of Parliament for Buckingham; 1891 – 1895 | Succeeded by William Carlile |
Baronetage of the United Kingdom
| New creation | Baronet (of Bletchley Park); 1911–1926 | Succeeded by George Edward Leon |
