= Bletchley Urban District =

Former local government area in Buckinghamshire, England

Coordinates: 51.9964°N 0.7210°W

Bletchley Fenny Stratford (1895–1911)
- Urban District
- Area
  - 1911: 3,714 acres (15.0 km^{2})
  - 1961: 4,458 acres (18.0 km^{2})
- Population
  - 1901: 4,799
  - 1971: 30,215
- History
  - Created: 1 July 1895
  - Abolished: 31 March 1974
  - Succeeded by: Milton Keynes
- Status: Urban District

Bletchley Urban District was an urban district covering the town of Bletchley in the administrative county of Buckinghamshire, England, from 1911 to 1974. The district had been created in 1895 as Fenny Stratford Urban District, being renamed to Bletchley Urban District in 1911.

== History ==
When district councils were established under the Local Government Act 1894, the small town of Fenny Stratford was not initially given its own district council, but was included in the Newport Pagnell Rural District. Prior to 1866, the town had straddled the parishes of Bletchley and Simpson. A Fenny Stratford parish had been created in 1866 from part of Bletchley parish, covering the main part of the Fenny Stratford urban area and also extending south-west from it to include Bletchley railway station and the associated urban area that was growing to the east of the railway station. The reduced Bletchley parish after 1866 therefore did not include the railway station which bore its name, but was instead focussed on the older village and rural areas to the west of the railway. Bletchley, Fenny Stratford, and Simpson were all given parish councils subordinate to the Newport Pagnell Rural District Council when the 1894 Act came into force at the end of December 1894.

As soon as the new parish and district councils were established, efforts began to create an urban district for Fenny Stratford, removing the town from the Newport Pagnell Rural District. It was decided that the urban district should cover the two parishes of Fenny Stratford and Simpson. The Fenny Stratford Urban District came into force on 1 July 1895, at which point the Fenny Stratford Parish Council and Simpson Parish Council were abolished. After elections, the Fenny Stratford Urban District Council held its first meeting on 1 August 1895 at the Bletchley Road Board Schools, when Joseph Baisley, a Liberal, was appointed the first chairman of the council.

The Fenny Stratford Urban District was enlarged on 1 April 1898 to also include the parish of Bletchley, with Bletchley Parish Council being abolished.

At a meeting on 14 February 1911 the council decided to seek a change of name for the district and council from Fenny Stratford to Bletchley, with the Bletchley name said to be better recognised by potential residents and businesses looking to invest in the area. The old centre of Fenny Stratford was in decline, whereas the area adjoining Bletchley station was growing to become the more significant commercial centre within the district. This change of name was agreed by Buckinghamshire County Council and came into effect on 16 May 1911.

In 1967 the new town of Milton Keynes was designated, with the Bletchley Urban District being incorporated within its designated area. The Milton Keynes Development Corporation was established to oversee construction of the new town, and Bletchley Urban District Council lost its town planning responsibilities to the development corporation.

Bletchley Urban District was abolished under the Local Government Act 1972, with the area becoming part of a non-metropolitan district, the Borough of Milton Keynes on 1 April 1974. Initially, no successor parish was created for the former urban district, and so Bletchley was governed directly by Milton Keynes Borough Council. Parishes were re-established for the area in 2001, with the part east of the railway line becoming Bletchley and Fenny Stratford and the west side (including historic Bletchley) becoming West Bletchley. The former Bletchley Council Offices was given the address 263 Queensway and was converted to become a Masonic Hall in 1975.

== Civil parishes ==
- Bletchley (after 1898)
- Fenny Stratford (abolished to enlarge Bletchley in 1934)
- Simpson (abolished to enlarge Bletchley in 1934)

== Premises ==
Fenny Stratford Urban District Council initially met at the Bletchley Road Board Schools (later renamed Knowles School). In 1901 the council tried to purchase the privately owned Fenny Stratford Town Hall at 32 Watling Street to use as its offices and meeting place. However, the Local Government Board would not sanction the necessary loan, instead recommending that the council bought a site and built itself new premises instead.

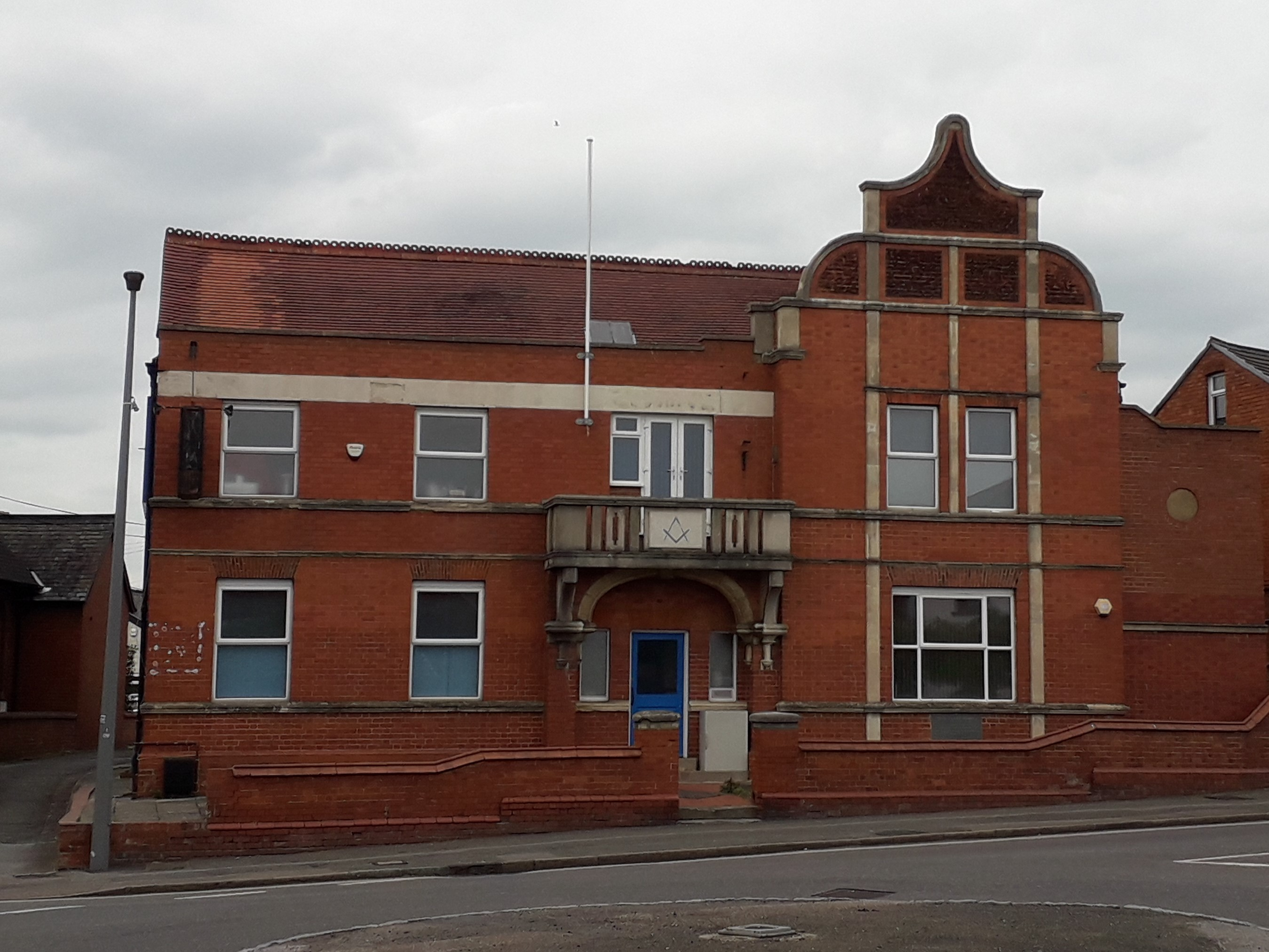
Former Council Offices, 263 Queensway, Bletchley

A site was bought later in 1901 at the corner of Victoria Road and Bletchley Road (renamed Queensway in 1966), in between the two centres of Fenny Stratford and Bletchley. A new building called "Council Offices" was built during 1902, with the architect being John Chadwick of Bletchley. The council held its first meeting in the new building on 13 January 1903. The council remained based at the Council Offices until its abolition.
