= Lord Grey Academy =

Academy in Milton Keynes, England

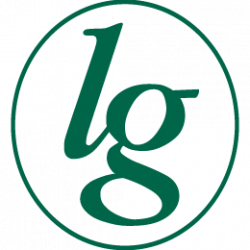

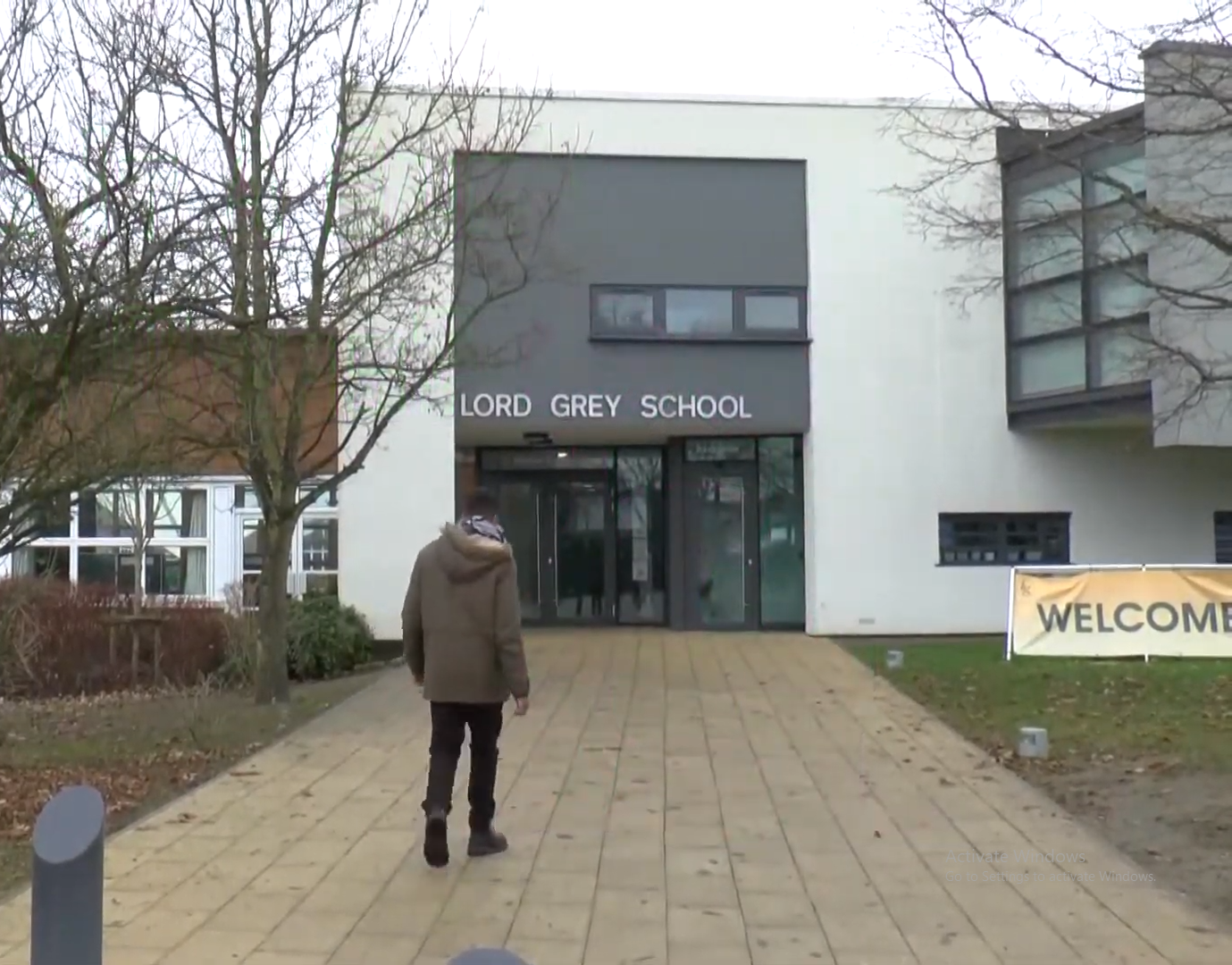

Location
- Rickley Lane; Bletchley, Milton Keynes, Buckinghamshire, MK3 6EW; England; 51°59′53″N 00°44′59″W

Information
- Type: Academy
- Motto: "Lord Grey Can"
- Established: 1973
- Local authority: City of Milton Keynes
- Department for Education URN: 145736 Tables
- Ofsted: Reports
- Chair: Jennie Cronin
- Executive Principal: Jim Parker
- Associate Principal: Samantha Satyanadhan
- Staff: 240
- Gender: Mixed
- Age: 11 to 19
- Enrollment: 1,446
- Houses: Lorenz; Enigma; Colossus; Turing
- Colours: Green and white
- Website: http://www.lordgrey.org.uk

Lord Grey Academy (formerly Lord Grey School) is a comprehensive 11-19 coeducational secondary academy and sixth form in West Bletchley, Milton Keynes, England. Previously a grant-maintained foundation school and specialist language and humanities college, the school academized on 1 April 2018 under the sponsorship of the Tove Learning Trust. It was created from the amalgamation of the Bletchley Grammar School and Wilton County Secondary School in 1973, opening on the site of the latter. From 2011 to 2014 the school operated, in partnership with Sir Herbert Leon Academy, the Milton Keynes South Sixth Form. Although this sixth form was discontinued the school still provides sixth form education independently.

The school was last graded by Ofsted as good and was previously requires improvement, satisfactory and inadequate. The school is larger than average with a population of 1449 pupils, of which 51% are girls and 49% are boys. 35.3% of students are eligible for free school meals and 17.9% speak English non-natively.

== History ==
=== Early years (1951-1973) ===
In 1951 the Wilton County Secondary School opened on Rickley Lane. Five years later the Bletchley Grammar School would open for 151 students in Bletchley Park, with an additional provision of technical education. Bletchley Grammar School's headmaster was Donald Halewood and its senior mistress F. Marrison. In December 1962 a new tower block was built on the grammar school site in order to accommodate the grown student population of 530. In 1973 Bletchley Grammar School closed for amalgamation with Wilton County Secondary School and its students were transferred. Wilton County Secondary School would officially amalgamate with Bletchley Grammar School in January 1973, becoming known as Lord Grey Comprehensive School.

=== Lord Grey School (1973-2018) ===
Lord Grey Comprehensive School opened in 1973 and was a community school. The previous facilities of Wilton County Secondary School were expanded upon, providing new accommodation. On 1 April 1993 the school became grant-maintained and on 1 September 1999 it became a foundation school. Between 1998 and 2002 the school became a specialist language college and received renovations. By the 2000s the school was called Lord Grey School.

In 2000 Headteacher Despina Pavlou was appointed. Pavlou would prove a divisive figure because of her strict zero-tolerance administration and anti-bullying policies. Under her tenure the school had a 97% GCSE pass rate and in 2003 the school was rated as "good" by Ofsted. Despite this she was accused of bullying and harassing staff and pupils and of using "school money to buy champagne, wine, a wooden shed and a business class flight to Australia." Pavlou and her school governors were sued by a former pupil who claimed to have been illegally excluded after being accused of arson in a school classroom. Although the pupil initially lost the battle, he won damages after an appeal. In March 2006, Pavlou was reported to have punched Deputy Headteacher Linda Lennox in the face during an argument regarding her zero-tolerance policies. This resulted in her being forced to remote work and in her replacement as head by Roger Conibear, however she was not suspended. A police investigation was undertaken and Pavlou was found guilty of unacceptable professional conduct some years later. She was then banned from working as both a head or deputy head. During this period the school motto was "Excellence: Dare to Succeed".

Roger Conibear would be replaced that same year by Jill Coughlan MBE who would serve as headteacher until 2009. Under her tenure the school became a specialist humanities college in 2006, fell from good to satisfactory in the Ofsted ranks in 2007 and was granted Comenius status. She would leave in 2009 to be replaced by Weston Favell School Headteacher Tracey Jones. Before becoming headteacher at Weston Favell, Jones was previously the deputy head of Lord Grey. This therefore meant she was returning to the school. In 2014 the school was graded as good yet again. In 2016 Jones' school uniform policies experienced mainstream media coverage after she called students who wore above-the-knee skirts and slim-fitting trousers "hefty" and therefore banned these clothing items, resulting in accusations of fat shaming. Jones argued that she thought the banned clothing items would look unflattering on the aforementioned “hefty” students, and that wearing such attire could potentially result in bullying. Jones ultimately resigned from the headteacher position in 2018.

In 2018 the school began its academisation process. The school would be sponsored by the Tove Learning Trust, a member of the SWAN Teaching School Alliance. The school would become an academy on 1 April, relinquishing its specialisms in language and the humanities. As a result the school's name changed from Lord Grey School to Lord Grey Academy and the position of headteacher was renamed to principal.

=== Lord Grey Academy (2018-present) ===
Principal Tracey Jones left on 31 August 2018, being succeeded by Jim Parker. In 2021 the school motto changed from "Aspire, Learn, Achieve" to "Lord Grey Can". Sometime between May and September 2021 Principal Jim Parker became executive principal, with his duties now being fulfilled by Associate Principal Samantha Satyanadhan under his supervision. Parker is also executive principal at Stantonbury School, where his associate principal is Ben Wilson.

== House system ==
Lord Grey has four school houses: Lorenz (red), Enigma (blue), Colossus (silver) and Turing (gold), whose names relate to World War II code-breaking work at Bletchley Park. Previously Turing house was called Ultra house. There also used to be a fifth house called Mercury (green). The houses compete for the house cup every year, with the best house being awarded. The houses are led by a head of house and their assistant. Each year group appoints a house captain from their numbers and each house appoints multiple representatives to the student council. The houses operate under a points based reward system called Vivio, which is likely used to determine who wins the house cup.

== Governance ==
The Lord Grey Academy is led administratively by Associate Principal Samantha Satyanadhan under the oversight of Executive Principal Jim Parker. Parker and Satyanadhan are both members of the school's local governing body, which governs the school locally. It is made up of Lord Grey staff members, parents and members of the local community. The chair is Jennie Cronin.

Student voice and participation in the school's administration is provided through the student council. A class meeting is held each week in every tutor group. These meetings are led by a student (with optional help from the teacher) and consist of a variety of topics that are discussed and relayed to the student council for debate. The council's decision is announced and implemented by the school's communications team. The communications team will do this in partnership with the student/students who brought the original class meeting proposition. This is done by creating an action team which consists of five or more students. The council has multiple representatives per year group from each house and also has a student principal team in the school's sixth form.

== Curriculum ==
The school's curriculum is provided by its nine faculties which are led by head of faculties. These faculties specialise in different school subjects and are as follows:

- Communications (enterprise and languages)
- Creative technologies
- English
- Humanities
- Inclusive learning
- Mathematics
- Performing arts
- Science
- Wellbeing

The school itself is divided into a lower school, upper school and sixth form. The lower school consists of years 7 to 9 and the upper school years 10 and 11. The lower school's curriculum follows England's national curriculum, whereas the upper school follows the EBacc and progress 8 benchmark. The upper school's curriculum also follows exam board requirements and is personalised, with students picking their KS4 options in Year 9. In 2021, 95% of pupils successfully had their first-choice options accepted. The school has offered remote education since the closure of British schools during the COVID-19 pandemic. The school offers parents loaned Chromebooks should they lack the equipment needed for remote education during these school closures. Students must also participate in remote education when self-isolating.

Previously Lord Grey was a specialist language and humanities college, gaining these specialisms in 1998 and 2006.
