= Blue Lagoon Local Nature Reserve =

Local nature reserve in Buckinghamshire, England

Coordinates: 51.9854°N 0.7369°W

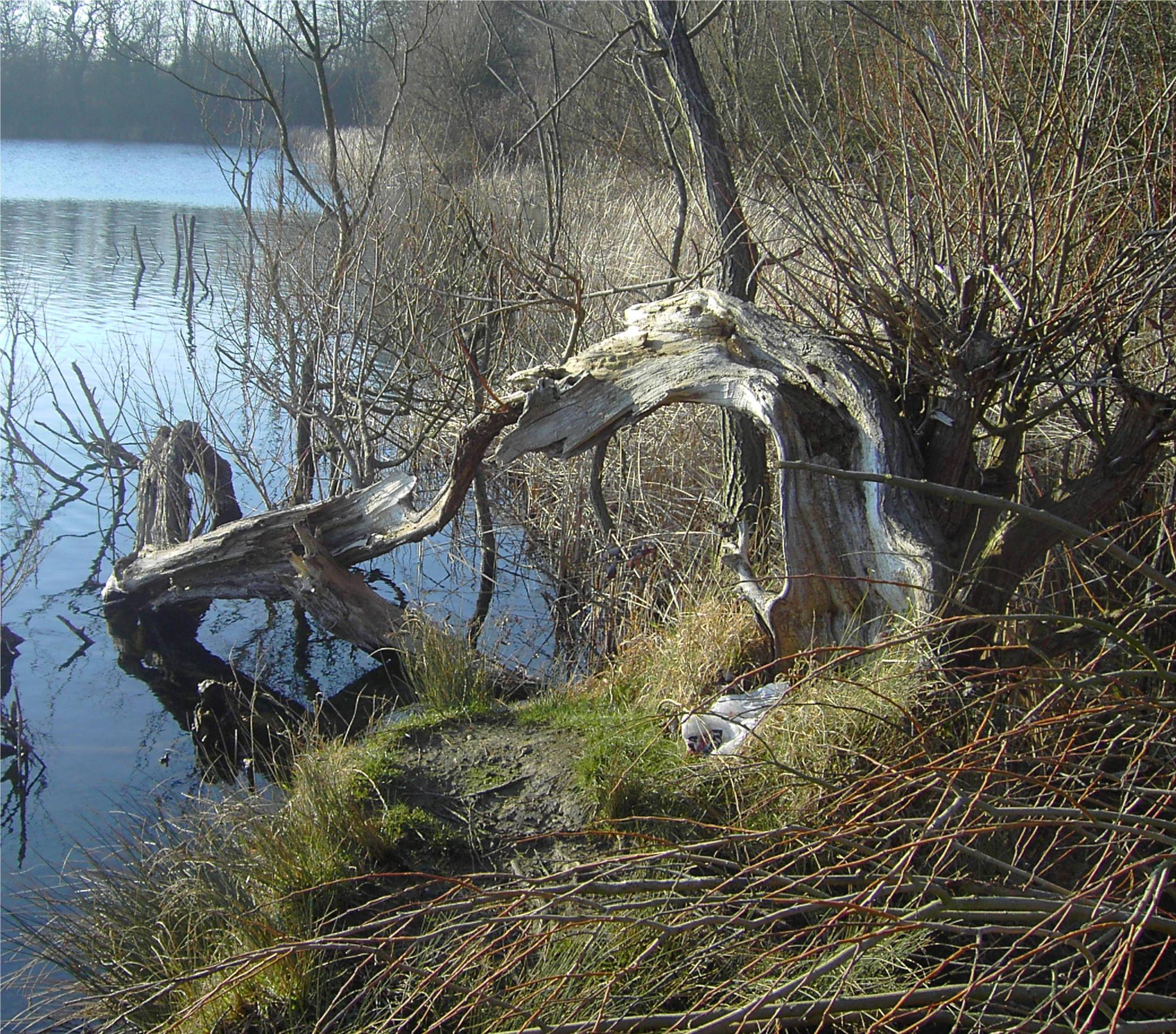
Part of the Blue Lagoon

The Blue Lagoon Local Nature Reserve is a Local Nature Reserve in Bletchley, Milton Keynes in Buckinghamshire, United Kingdom. The Blue Lagoon is the only Local Nature Reserve in the City of Milton Keynes, covering 116 acres (47 ha). The diverse habitat, including shallow and deep water, grassland, scrubland and woodland, hosts an abundance of fauna and flora. The Blue Lagoon is also extensively used as a recreational facility.

== History ==
The Blue Lagoon lies on part of the site of the former Read & Andrews brickworks. Bletchley lies on the Oxford Clay Belt and the manufacture of bricks was an important industry for the area from the late 19th century. The works on the Blue Lagoon site were closed in 1970 and in 1990 the manufacture of bricks on the neighbouring site finished. The chimney from the brickworks was demolished in December 1992.

The area of the nature reserve contains two pits: the northern Water Eaton pit, now known as the Blue Lagoon, and the southern Flettons pit. The Water Eaton pit was flooded in the 1940s when the adjoining Water Eaton Brook burst its banks. The pure blue colour of the pit gave the lake its colloquial and now official name. The Flettons pit was used in brick manufacture until 1970 and in the early 1980s was used as a landfill site.

== Local Nature Reserve ==
The site was redeveloped to upgrade it to Local Nature Reserve status and was opened in 1994. The two parts of the site retained distinctive characters reflecting their differing history and this adds to the diversity of the site.

The Blue Lagoon itself, the main lake on the site, occupies the northern half of the site, bordered by the Water Eaton Brook to the north, the West Coast Main Line to the east and the Newton Longville Landfill Site to the west. The lake is 18 metres deep and so utilised by the Milton Keynes Sub-Aqua Club. They have planted a bus, two cars and a light aircraft to explore. There are also a further six sunken boats and concrete pipes on the lake bed. The lake supports a diverse ecosystem: pike, perch, roach, crayfish are often reported and tench and carp are occasionally seen. As such, the lake is used as an angling site.

The southern section of the reserve, around what remains of the Flettons pit, is landscaped around former spoil heaps. The area contains scrub and grasslands and is rich in plants and animals, including some abundant in chalk downland areas but rare in Milton Keynes.

The reserve has experienced fly-tipping and vandalism.
