= Bletchley and Fenny Stratford =

Civil parish in Milton Keynes, England

Coordinates: 51.9928°N 0.7272°W

- Civil parish
- Location within Buckinghamshire
- Interactive map of Bletchley and Fenny Stratford
- Population: 21,488 (2021 census)
- OS grid reference: SP868338
- District: City of Milton Keynes
- Unitary authority: Milton Keynes City Council
- Ceremonial county: Buckinghamshire
- Region: South East
- Country: England
- Sovereign state: United Kingdom
- Post town: Milton Keynes
- Postcode district: MK1, MK2
- Dialling code: 01908
- Police: Thames Valley
- Fire: Buckinghamshire
- Ambulance: South Central
- UK Parliament: Buckingham and Bletchley

Bletchley and Fenny Stratford is a civil parish with a town council, in Milton Keynes, Buckinghamshire, England. It was formed in 2001 from the unparished area of Milton Keynes and, according to the 2021 census, had a population of 21,476. Together with West Bletchley, it forms the Bletchley built-up area.

The parish includes Brickfields (includes the Blue Lagoon), Central Bletchley (that is, Bletchley east of the West Coast Main Line), Denbigh (Denbigh North, Denbigh East and Denbigh West), Fenny Stratford, Fenny Lock, Granby, Mount Farm and Water Eaton (includes "Lakes Estate").

== Central Bletchley ==
Originally, Bletchley was exclusively west of the railway line (which is why the station faces that way) and was centred on St. Mary's Church (Church of England), Bletchley Park, and the Freeman Memorial Methodist chapel on Buckingham Road. This area is now known as "Old Bletchley", Another settlement was situated between the crossroads of Shenley Road, Newton Road, and Buckingham Road, and the t-junction of Tattenhoe Lane and Buckingham Road. By 1926, this had become known as "Far Bletchley".

However, as Bletchley developed, a new centre grew up around Bletchley Road (the road from Fenny Stratford to [Old] Bletchley). The new settlement became known as "Central Bletchley", distinguishing it from Old Bletchley and Far Bletchley, and from the later development of West Bletchley, which embraced these two. In 1966, after a royal visit, Bletchley Urban District Council renamed Bletchley Road as "Queensway".

Central Bletchley is bordered by the West Coast Main Line to the west, the Water Eaton Brook and Water Eaton Road to the south, North Street and Bletchley Leisure Centre to the North and Knowles School/Leon Recreational Ground to the East. The dividing line between Central Bletchley and Fenny Stratford is largely a notional one.

== Denbigh ==
For many years, Denbigh has been an important employment area: perhaps its most famous resident is Marshall Amplification.

In 2005, large commercial developments occurred on the immediate outskirts of Bletchley, although still in the civil parish of Bletchley and Fenny Stratford. The supermarket chain Asda and the Swedish furniture retailer IKEA built and opened large stores at Denbigh North, northeast of the town centre on Watling Street, and Tesco responded by expanding its Fenny Stratford store (also on Watling Street). Whether or not these new developments accelerate the decline of the town centre remains to be seen.

This same area of development is also home to the new stadium:mk for Milton Keynes Dons F.C. Many away fans will arrive via Bletchley railway station, and this may bring some added business to the town on their way to the ground. However, most fans will use intercity services to Milton Keynes Central and be bussed to the stadium.

== Brickfields ==
Brickfields was an area of Oxford Clay extraction and brickmaking, between Water Eaton and Newton Longville, owned and operated by the London Brick Company. Subsequently, the area was used as a landfill site, importing waste from London.

=== The Blue Lagoon ===
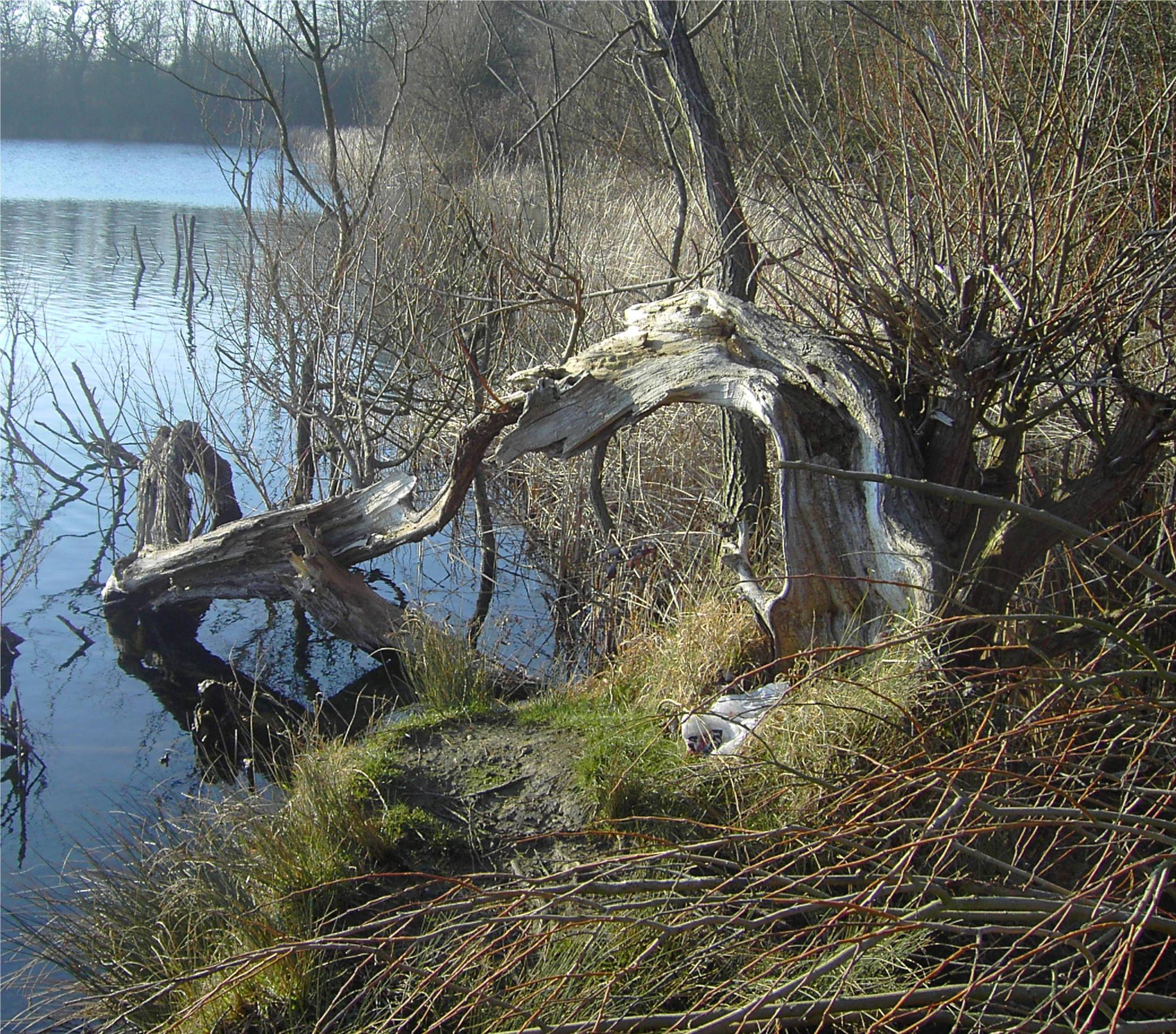
Part of the Blue Lagoon

Bletchley is home to the Blue Lagoon, the only local nature reserve in the city, which consists of a flooded clay pit and its surroundings.. School children in Bletchley are often taken on trips to learn about the history of this site.

=== Newton Leys ===
Newton Leys is a modern development, largely on the former clay extraction site (following reclamation works). Most of the development is in this civil parish but a part is in Stoke Hammond.

== Water Eaton ==
Water Eaton is a small village to the south of Fenny Stratford, which was absorbed by Bletchley and Fenny Stratford, before the latter in turn became part of Milton Keynes. The village was first mentioned in the Domesday book of 1086 and was simply called Eaton and was the home of Geoffrey de Montbray and listed as a mill.

The Lakes Estate, south of Bletchley, was the last London overspill estate to be built by the Greater London Council. It took some time to build – beginning in about 1970 and not being fully completed until 1975."

The Lakes Estate is bordered by Drayton road to the North and West, Stoke road to the East and Lomond drive to the south.

== Demographics ==
Census population of Bletchley and Fenny Stratford parish
| Census | Population | Female | Male | Households | Source |
|---|---|---|---|---|---|
| 2001 | 13,971 | 7,032 | 6,939 | 5,611 | |
| 2011 | 15,313 | 7,868 | 7,445 | 6,198 | |
| 2021 | 21,476 | 10,949 | 10,527 | 8,256 | |

== City council ward ==
In Milton Keynes City Council elections, the parish is divided into the wards of Bletchley Park, Bletchley West and Bletchley East.
