= The Duston School =

Location
- Berrywood Road; Duston, Northamptonshire, NN5 6XA; England; 52.2486°N 0.9566°W

Information
- Type: Academy
- Motto: Knowledge itself is power
- Established: 2007
- Local authority: West Northamptonshire
- Department for Education URN: 138214 Tables
- Ofsted: Reports
- Principal: Samuel Strickland
- Gender: Mixed
- Age: 4 to 19
- Houses: Willow, Chestnut, Maple, Oak
- Colour: Blue
- Website: http://www.thedustonschool.org/

The Duston School is a mixed all-through school and sixth form located in Duston in the English county of Northamptonshire.

== History ==
Previously known as Duston Upper School, it educated children aged 13 to 18. Due to school reorganisation in Northamptonshire in 2004 the school expanded its intake to 11-year-olds to become a full secondary school, and it was renamed to The Duston School. The school converted to academy status in June 2012 under the sponsorship of the Academies Enterprise Trust. The school has since become independent of the AET, forming the Duston Education Trust which also includes a new primary section on the school's grounds, opened in September 2015. Previously it was a foundation school administered by Northamptonshire County Council. The school continues to coordinate with Northamptonshire County Council for admissions.

The Duston School offers GCSEs and vocational courses as programmes of study for pupils, while sixth form students can choose to study from range of A Levels and other vocational courses.

== A-Level ICT Results Controversy ==
In June 2016, The Daily Mirror reported that the majority of students at The Duston School who were studying A-Level ICT in Year 12 were taught the wrong curriculum in the subject and received U-grades for their work. Duston School Executive Principal Jane Herriman left her post in the week before the story was reported. The school refused to comment directly on the matter.

== Notable former pupils ==
- Ross McLean English cricketer
- Laura Tobin English broadcast meteorologist, currently employed by ITV
