= Newton Longville =

Village in Buckinghamshire, England

Coordinates: 51.975°N 0.771°W

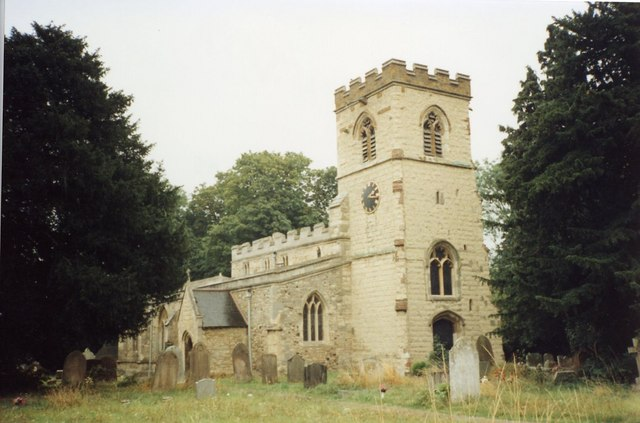
- St Faith's parish church

- Location within Buckinghamshire
- Interactive map of Newton Longville
- Population: 1,846 (2011 Census)
- OS grid reference: SP8431
- Civil parish: Newton Longville
- Unitary authority: Buckinghamshire Council
- Ceremonial county: Buckinghamshire
- Region: South East
- Country: England
- Sovereign state: United Kingdom
- Post town: Milton Keynes
- Postcode district: MK17
- Dialling code: 01908
- Police: Thames Valley
- Fire: Buckinghamshire
- Ambulance: South Central
- UK Parliament: Buckingham and Bletchley
- Website: Newton Longville Parish Council

Newton Longville is a village and civil parish in Buckinghamshire, England. The village is about 2 miles (3 km) south-west of Bletchley in Milton Keynes.

== History ==
The toponym "Newton" is derived from the Old English for "new farm". It is recorded in the Domesday Book of 1086 as Nevtone. The affix "Longville" was added in the 13th century after the Cluniac priory of Longueville, Calvados, in Normandy, France, that held the manor of Newton at that time, and to distinguish this village from other places called Newton, particularly nearby Newton Blossomville. In 1441, when its previous holder died without an heir, the Crown bestowed the manor on the Warden and fellows of New College, Oxford.

Parts of the Church of England parish church of Saint Faith are late 12th century, but the exterior is largely Perpendicular Gothic.

Most of the cottages in Newton Longville date between 1575 and 1625 and are timber cruck-framed with thatched roofs, with good examples at Moor End.

Newton Longville is twinned with Longueville-sur-Scie in Normandy, France.

The main industry in the village between 1847 and 1991 was brick making. The village had a large brick factory, originally belonging to the Read family, becoming the Bletchley Brick company in 1923, and then taken over by the London Brick Company (LBC) in 1929. The works made Fletton bricks and distributed them all over the country. It was closed in November 1991 after Hanson Trust bought the London Brick Company.

== Amenities ==
Newton Longville Church of England Combined School is a mixed, voluntary controlled primary school, that takes children between the ages of four and eleven. It has slightly over 200 pupils.

== Twenty-first century ==
=== Salden Place ===
In 2009 Buckinghamshire County Council proposed a new settlement called "Salden Chase" outside the village, adjacent to West Bletchley.

The development was later renamed Salden Park, and subsequently Salden Place by the developer Taylor Wimpey.

Construction on the eastern initial phase commenced in late 2024, and the first homes are set to be delivered by the end of 2025. Meanwhile, work on the western initial phase commenced in mid-2025.

=== Bletchley West TMD ===
East West Rail, set to re-establish the rail link between Oxford and Cambridge via Bletchley, runs through the north of the parish near Buckingham Road. In late January 2026, the East West Rail Company announced that it proposes to establish a new train maintenance depot at a site that it calls "Bletchley West", just west of Salden Place. The location for the site seems to be that of the former Swanbourne sidings. (Note: near grid reference SP830317,)

Buckinghamshire Council (the local authority as the parish is outside Milton Keynes) criticized the proposal and the fact of its announcement prior to any discussion with them.

== See also ==
- Walter Giffard, Lord of Longueville

== Sources and further reading ==
- Martin, Roger; Bates, Jimmy (1995). A Pictorial History of Newton Longville. Newton Longville: Roger Martin.
- Page, William, ed. (1905). "The Cluniac Priory of Newton Longville". A History of the County of Buckingham. Victoria County History. Vol. 1. pp. 395–396.
- Page, William, ed. (1927). "Newton Longville or Newnton Longueville". A History of the County of Buckingham. Victoria County History. Vol. 4. pp. 425–429.
- Pevsner, Nikolaus (1973) [1960]. Buckinghamshire. The Buildings of England. Harmondsworth: Penguin Books. pp. 215–216. ISBN 0-14-071019-1.
