= Executive head teacher =

An executive head teacher, executive head master, executive head mistress, executive head or executive principal is the substantive or strategic head teacher of more than one school in the United Kingdom.

The role of an executive head teacher usually comes in one of three forms: 1) The executive head teacher is responsible for the management of more than one school. 2) The executive head teacher remains the head teacher of their current school, but also becomes the strategic leader of one or more other schools. 3) The executive head teacher has no substantive headship in any school but remains the strategic leader of a chain, federation or collaboration of schools. In the third option, the executive head teacher is above the head teachers appointed to manage each individual school within the consortium.

The role of executive head teachers was first introduced in 2004; in 1997, the then-Prime Minister, Tony Blair, announced that a new policy would allow head teachers who had been classed as outstanding to take over the leadership of schools that had been designated by local authorities as failing. The idea put forward that, once the standards in those failing schools had improved, a new head teacher could take over. Today, however, the role and idea of executive head teachers has expanded, with many staying in place within a system leadership role rather than specific headship roles, working with a number of head teachers.
