= West Bletchley =

Civil parish in Milton Keynes, England

Coordinates: 51.9926°N 0.7515°W

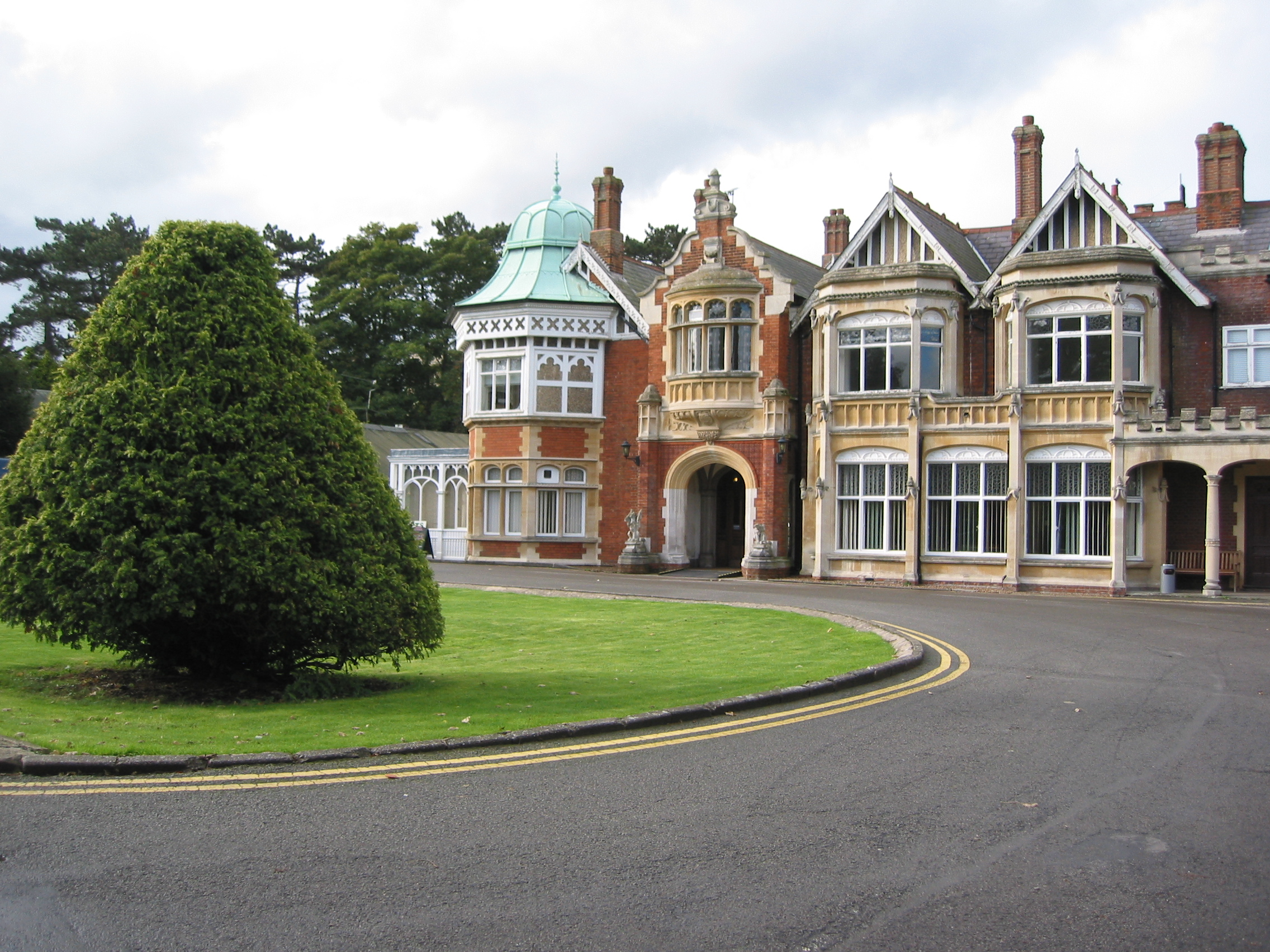
- The main house at Bletchley Park

- Location within Buckinghamshire
- Interactive map of West Bletchley
- Population: 23,291 (2021 census)
- OS grid reference: SP868338
- Civil parish: West Bletchley
- District: City of Milton Keynes
- Unitary authority: Milton Keynes City Council
- Ceremonial county: Buckinghamshire
- Region: South East
- Country: England
- Sovereign state: United Kingdom
- Post town: MILTON KEYNES
- Postcode district: MK3
- Dialling code: 01908
- Police: Thames Valley
- Fire: Buckinghamshire
- Ambulance: South Central
- UK Parliament: Buckingham and Bletchley

West Bletchley is a civil parish that covers the western part of Bletchley, a constituent town of Milton Keynes in Buckinghamshire, England. The parish consists of that part of Bletchley which is south of Standing Way/H8 (A421), west of the West Coast Main Line, and north of Water Eaton Brook. The remainder of Bletchley is combined with Fenny Stratford to form the parish of Bletchley and Fenny Stratford.

== Geography ==
West Bletchley contains three major residential districts with parish council wards within them. These wards/estates include:

Old Bletchley

- Church Green
- Bletchley Park
- Poets

Far Bletchley

- Castles
- Fairways
- Racecourses
- Rivers
- Saints

West Bletchley

- Abbyies
- Scotts
- Counties

=== City Council wards ===
West Bletchley is split between two electoral wards for representation to Milton Keynes City Council. Far Bletchley and the golf course area is in the Whaddon Ward (which, despite its name and proximity, does not include the village of Whaddon in the Buckinghamshire Council area); the remainder of the parish is in the Bletchley and Fenny Stratford ward.

== Notable buildings and sites ==
=== Church of St Mary ===
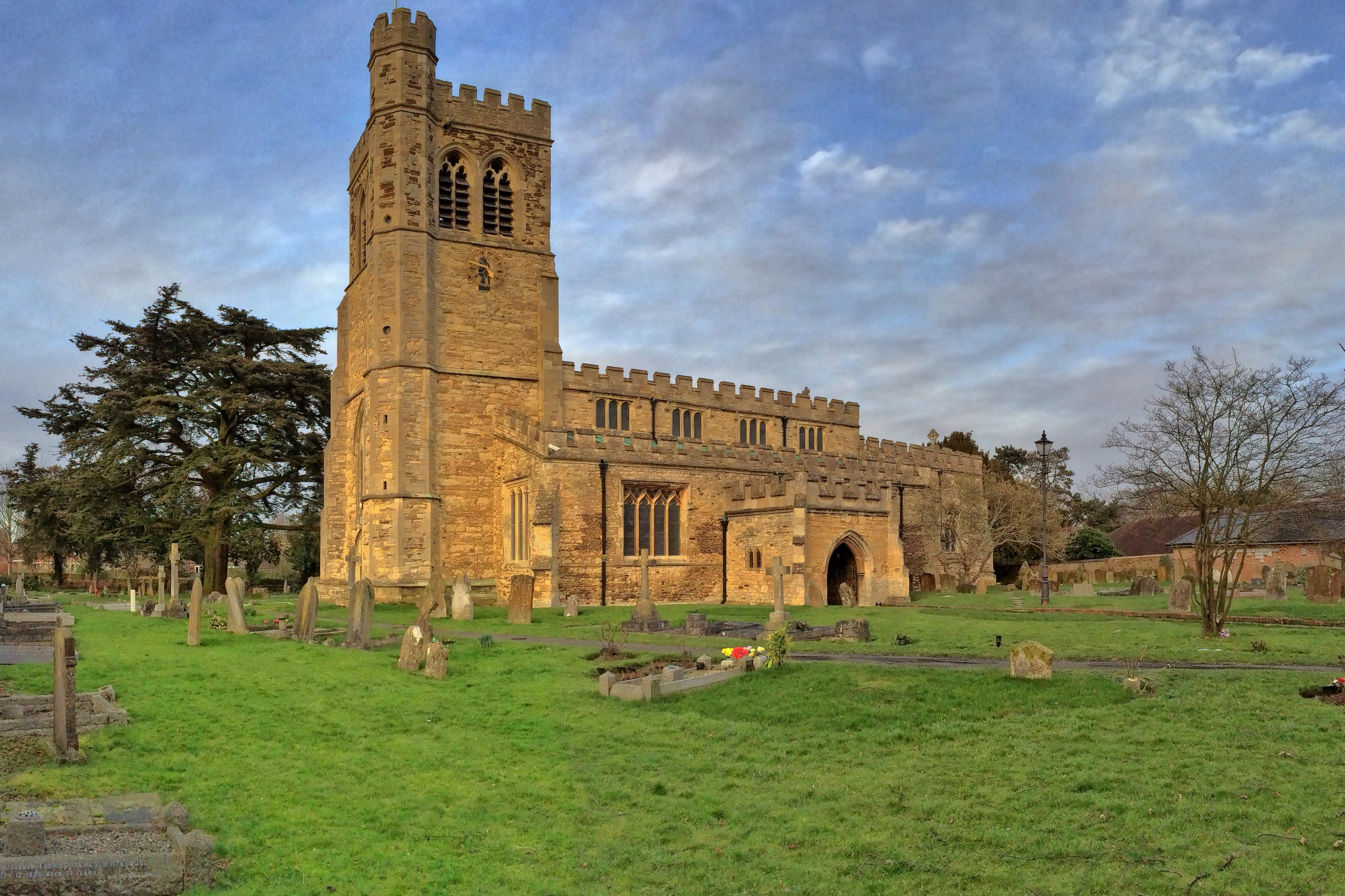
Church of St Mary

The parish church of St Mary in Church Green is a Grade I listed building.

=== Bletchley Park ===
Within the West Bletchley parish, in the Church Green district, is Bletchley Park. During the Second World War, it was home to the Government Code and Cypher School, the primary location for Allied work to decipher Axis Powers' secret messages. There are two museums on the site: the National Museum of Computing as well as the main Bletchley Park museum.

=== Railway station ===
The main buildings of Bletchley railway station are in this parish, although the West Coast Main Line marks the boundary between this parish and its neighbour. There has been a station here since 1839.

== Education ==
=== Primary ===
Children in the area attend a number of primary schools in the parish, which include: Milton Keynes Preparatory School, St. Thomas Aquinas Catholic Primary School, Holne Chase Primary School, White Spire School, Rickley Park Primary School and Chestnuts Primary School.

=== Special school ===
White Spire School, an all age (5–19) mixed special school for pupils with Moderate Learning Difficulties, is located on Rickley Lane in West Bletchley. Pupils are referred to the school by the Inclusion Division of Milton Keynes Council, taking pupils from across Milton Keynes and, in some instances, further afield.

=== Secondary ===
- Lord Grey Academy, a comprehensive school.

== See also ==
- Bletchley and Fenny Stratford, the other civil parish in 'greater Bletchley'.
- Bletchley West TMD – Proposed train maintenance depot in Newton Longville civil parish
