= Water Eaton, Milton Keynes =

Village in Milton Keynes, Buckinghamshire, England

Coordinates: 51°59′20″N 0°43′18″W

Water Eaton
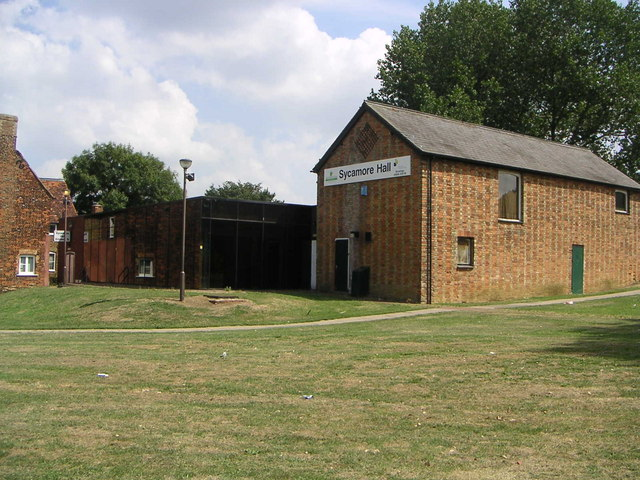
- Sycamore Hall

- Location within Buckinghamshire
- Interactive map of Water Eaton
- OS grid reference: SP875325
- Civil parish: Bletchley and Fenny Stratford
- Unitary authority: Milton Keynes
- Ceremonial county: Buckinghamshire
- Region: South East
- Country: England
- Sovereign state: United Kingdom

Water Eaton is an area of Milton Keynes, Buckinghamshire, England and in the civil parish of Bletchley and Fenny Stratford. It is to the south of Fenny Stratford and contiguous with it. It is one of the ancient Buckinghamshire villages that became incorporated as part of Milton Keynes in 1967.

== History ==
By the date of designation of Milton Keynes, Water Eaton had already been virtually absorbed by the 1960s Greater London Council-built London overspill district known as the Lakes Estate. The GLC was very proud of the Lakes Estate, declaring it to be the finest in modern architecture for a working class estate, based on the Radburn design concept pioneered in Radburn, New Jersey. The Lakes Estate was one of a number of developments around Bletchley and Fenny Stratford in the 1950s and 60s, intended to resettle people from poor-quality housing in war-damaged London.

Water Eaton was formerly a hamlet in the parish of Bletchley, in 1866 Water Eaton became a separate civil parish, on 1 April 1934 the parish was abolished and merged with Bletchley. In 1931 the parish had a population of 180.

== Name ==
The village name 'Eaton' is Old English language word referring to a farming settlement, and the whole means 'farm by a river'. It is first mentioned in the 1086 Domesday Book (as simply Eaton); when it was held by Geoffrey de Montbray, and was listed as having a Mill.

== See also ==
- "Bigger, Better, Brighter" — Bletchley in the 20th Century
