= Bletchley =

Constituent town of Milton Keynes, in Buckinghamshire, England

Coordinates: 51.994°N 0.732°W

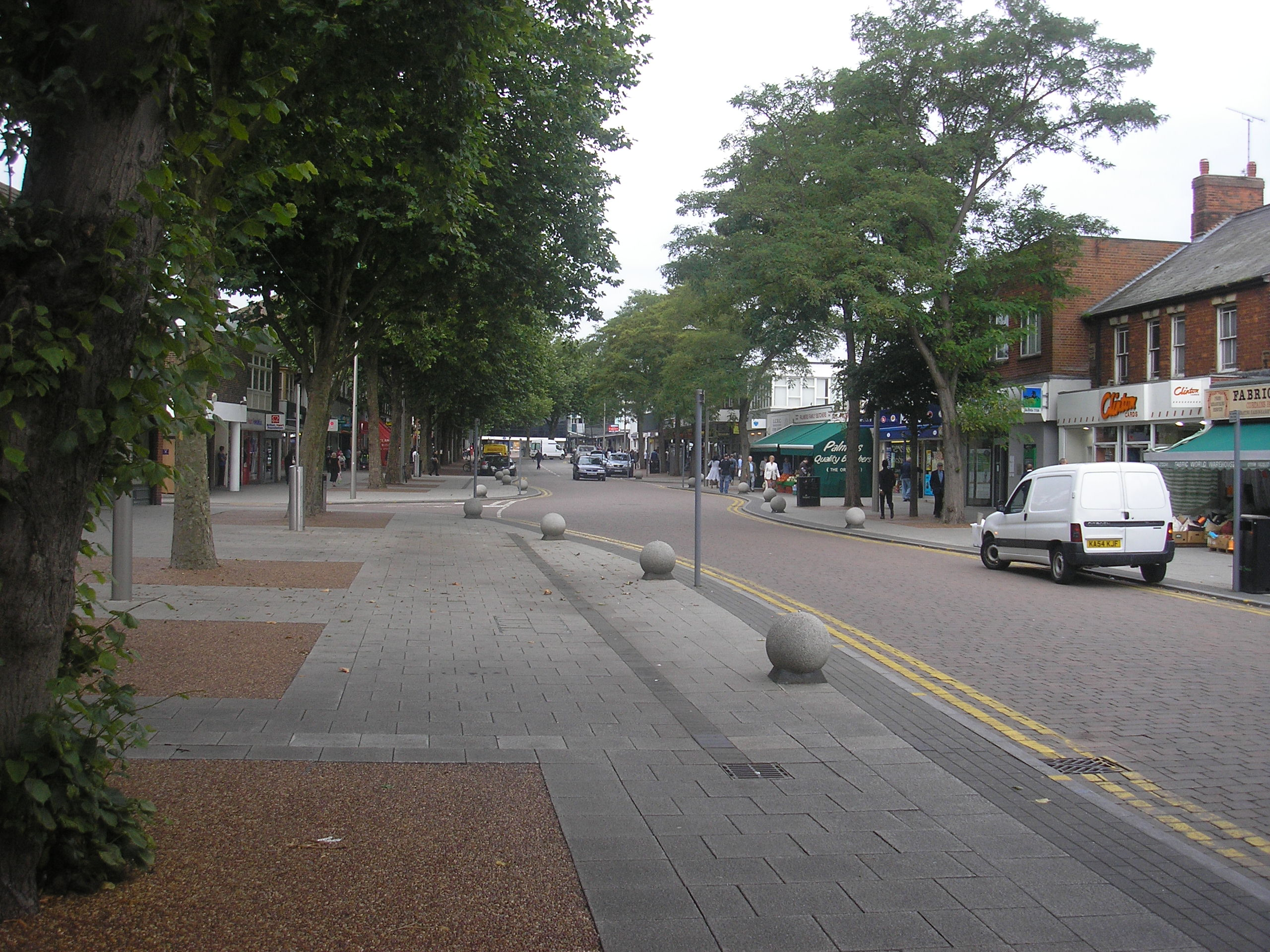
- Queensway, the main shopping street

- Location within Buckinghamshire
- Interactive map of Bletchley
- Population: 45,010 (Built-up area, 2021).
- OS grid reference: SP872336
  - London: 43 miles (69 km)
- Civil parish: Bletchley and Fenny Stratford, West Bletchley
- District: City of Milton Keynes
- Unitary authority: Milton Keynes City Council
- Ceremonial county: Buckinghamshire
- Region: South East
- Country: England
- Sovereign state: United Kingdom
- Post town: MILTON KEYNES
- Postcode district: MK1-3
- Dialling code: 01908
- Police: Thames Valley
- Fire: Buckinghamshire
- Ambulance: South Central
- UK Parliament: Buckingham and Bletchley

Bletchley is a constituent town of Milton Keynes, a city in Buckinghamshire, England. It gives its name to a larger census "built-up area" that occupies the south-west of the city and which is divided by the West Coast Main Line railway between the civil parishes of Bletchley & Fenny Stratford and West Bletchley, together with a fragment of Stoke Hammond CP. At the 2021 census, the population of this wider area was 45,010.

Bletchley and Fenny Stratford CP, which includes its commercial centre, consists of two towns with one town council. West Bletchley, which includes its pre-railways village centre, has a parish council. The latter is best known for Bletchley Park, the headquarters of Britain's World War II codebreaking organisation and now a major tourist attraction; the National Museum of Computing is also located in the park.

== History ==
=== Origins and early modern history ===
The town name is Anglo-Saxon and means Blæcca's clearing. It was first recorded in manorial rolls in the 12th century as Bicchelai, then later as Blechelegh (13th century) and Blecheley (14th–16th centuries). Just to the south of Fenny Stratford, there was Romano-British town, MAGIOVINIUM on either side of Watling Street, a Roman road.

Bletchley was originally a minor village on the outskirts of Fenny Stratford, of lesser importance than Water Eaton. Fenny Stratford fell into decline from the English Civil War (17c) onwards. Bletchley railway station was built to serve the London and Birmingham Railway from 1838 (now part of the West Coast Main Line). The subsequent branch lines to Bedford (1846) and Buckingham (1850) together grew subsequently to become the Varsity Line between Oxford and Cambridge, making it a significant junction station. The town grew to eclipse both its antecedent settlements.

Almost forty years after the construction of the station, the 1884/5 Ordnance Survey map showed the settlement as still just a small village around the Church of England parish church at Old Bletchley. There was a separate hamlet near to the Methodist chapel and Shoulder of Mutton public house, at the junction of Shenley Road/Newton Road with Buckingham Road. These districts are known today as Old Bletchley and Far Bletchley. The major settlement of the time is nearby Fenny Stratford.

The Bletchley area is rich in Oxford Clay, which has long been used for bricks. Brick-making has taken place on the Newton Leys site and the surrounding area from the late 19th century, circa 1897. Bletchley Brickworks closed in September 1990.

=== "Bigger, Better, Brighter" ===
In the urban growth of the Victorian period brought by the railway, the town merged with Fenny Stratford. The latter had been constituted an urban district, with Simpson, in 1895 and Bletchley was added in 1898. By 1911, the population of the combined parishes was 5,166, but the balance between them had changed; in that year, the name of the local council (Urban District) changed from Fenny Stratford UD to Bletchley UD. The 1926 Ordnance Survey map shows the settlements beginning to merge, with large private houses along the Bletchley Road between them. In 1933, the newly-founded Bletchley Gazette began a campaign for a "Bigger, Better, Brighter, Bletchley".

As the nation emerged from World War II, Bletchley Council renewed its desire to expand from its 1951 population of 10,919. By mid-1952, the council was able to agree terms with five London boroughs to accept people and businesses from bombed-out sites in the capital. This trend continued through the 1950s and 1960s, culminating (Note: Meaning both "the last" and "the best". The Greater London Council was very proud of the Lakes Estate, declaring it to be the finest in modern architecture for a working class estate, based on the design concept pioneered in Radburn, New Jersey) in the Greater London Council–funded Lakes Estate in Water Eaton parish, even as Milton Keynes was being founded.

Industrial development kept pace, with former London businesses relocating to new industrial estates in Mount Farm and Denbigh; Marshall Amplification was the most notable. With compulsory purchase, Bletchley Road (now renamed to Queensway after a royal visit in 1966) became the new high street with wide pavements where front gardens once lay. Houses near the railway end were replaced by shops, but those nearer Fenny Stratford became banks and professional premises. At the 1971 Census, the population of the Bletchley Urban District was 30,642.

=== Bletchley in Milton Keynes ===
Proposals for a new city in North Buckinghamshire had been floated from the early 1960s. Bletchley had fought to be the centre of the proposed new city, but when the Milton Keynes designation order was made in 1967, Bletchley was at its southern end rather than its centre. The 1971 Plan for Milton Keynes placed Central Milton Keynes on a completely new hill-top site 4 miles (6.4 km) further north, halfway to Wolverton. Bletchley was relegated to the status of suburb.

Bletchley thrived in the early years of the growth of Milton Keynes, since it was the main shopping area. Bletchley centre was altered considerably when the Brunel Shopping Centre was built in the early 1970s, creating a new end to Queensway. Previously, Queensway – formerly known as Bletchley Road – was a continuous run from Fenny Stratford to Old Bletchley. The town's boom came to an end when the new Central Milton Keynes Shopping Centre was built and commercial Bletchley has declined as a retail destination since then.

The town's importance as a major hub within Milton Keynes and the wider region was recognised in March 2021, following a successful bid by the Bletchley and Fenny Stratford Town Deal Board. MK City Council was successful in securing an award of £22.7 million as part of the UK Government's New Towns Deal, with the city council focusing most of that money on Bletchley and Fenny Stratford. This led to the publishing of their Town Investment Plan (TIP), which aimed to boost jobs, skills and connectivity in the area, and further invest in Bletchley town centre).

== Demographics ==
For the 2001 census, the Office for National Statistics (ONS) designated an urban sub-area that approximates to the boundaries of the former Bletchley Urban District Council at the time of the designation of Milton Keynes; it also included that part of Winslow Rural District that fell within the designation. In outline, the ONS sub-area consisted of Bletchley and Fenny Stratford CP, West Bletchley CP, and part of Shenley Brook End Civil Parish (specifically Furzton, Emerson Valley, Tattenhoe and Snelshall). At the 2001 Census, the population of the sub-area was 47,176.

For the 2011 census, the ONS designated a 'built up area sub-division' it called "Bletchley": that part of Milton Keynes that is west of the A5 and south of the A421 (thus releasing the part of Shenley Brook End), The population of the area was 37,114.

For the 2021 census, the ONS specified a larger area as a 'built-up area', adding the part of Stoke Hammond parish that is in the Newton Leys neighborhood. The population of the area had reached 45,010.

== Governance ==
Bletchley has three electoral wards of Milton Keynes City Council (Bletchley East, Bletchley West and Bletchley Park), with nine city councillors. It is divided (mainly) by the West Coast Main Line (WCML) into two civil parishes, West Bletchley and Bletchley & Fenny Stratford (with a small part of Stoke Hammond CP at its southerly extreme). It is a major element of the Buckingham and Bletchley parliamentary constituency, contributing well over half of its constituents, (Note: 45,010 out of 73,644)

=== Civil parishes ===
Bletchley & Fenny Stratford CP covers that part of Milton Keynes that is south of the A421, (mostly) east of the WCML, and west of the A5 road. The neighbourhoods that make up the parish are: Brickfields (includes the Blue Lagoon), Central Bletchley, Denbigh (including Denbigh North), Eaton Manor, Fenny Stratford, Granby, Manor Farm, Mount Farm, Newton Leys and Water Eaton (including Lakes Estate). At the 2021 Census, the population of the parish was 21,488. Newton Leys overlaps the administrative boundary, with a small part in the Stoke Hammond CP (which is in the part of the county administered by Buckinghamshire Council)

West Bletchley CP covers that part of Milton Keynes that is south of the A421, west of the WCML and (mostly) north of the Oxford–Bletchley line. At the 2021 Census, the population of this parish was 23,291. The districts and neighbourhoods in the parish include Church Green (including Bletchley Park), Far Bletchley, Old Bletchley, West Bletchley (district), Whaddon, (Note: Ward around Whaddon Way; not to be confused with nearby Whaddon in Aylesbury Vale.) and Newton Leys

=== Administrative history ===
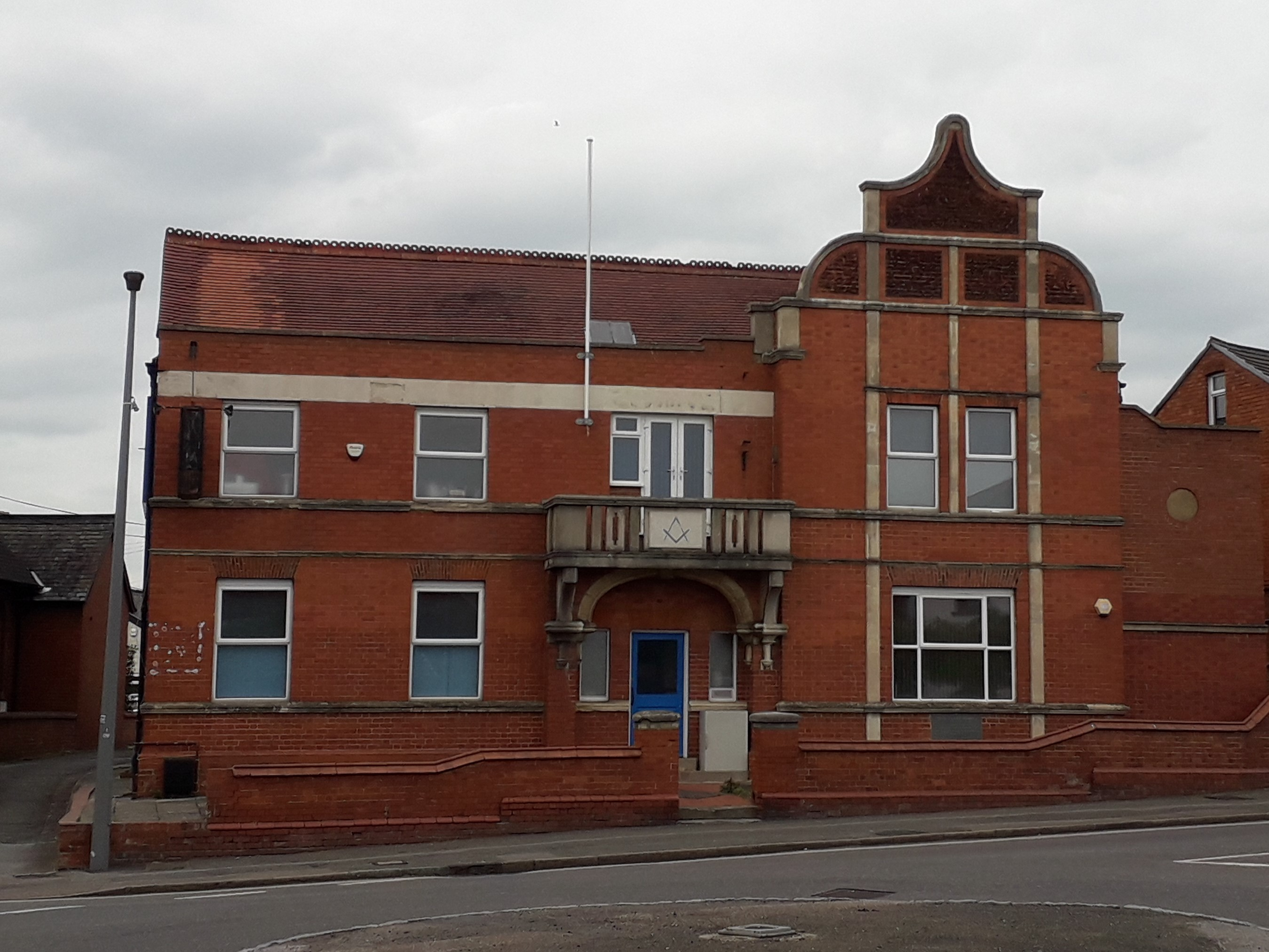
263 Queensway: Completed in 1903 as offices of the Fenny Stratford Urban District Council, which was renamed Bletchley Urban District Council in 1911

Bletchley was an ancient parish in the Newport Hundred of Buckinghamshire. The parish was subdivided into three townships: Fenny Stratford, Water Eaton, and a Bletchley township covering the western part of the parish around the old village. Although the railway station was named after the wider parish, it actually lay in the Fenny Stratford township rather than the Bletchley township. The townships took on parish functions under the poor laws from the 17th century onwards, and therefore each township became a civil parish in 1866 when the legal definition of 'parish' was changed to be the areas used for administering the poor laws.

When elected parish and district councils were established under the Local Government Act 1894, the three civil parishes of Bletchley, Fenny Stratford and Water Eaton were initially all included in the Newport Pagnell Rural District. In 1895, a new urban district called Fenny Stratford was created covering the two civil parishes of Fenny Stratford and Simpson. The Fenny Stratford Urban District was enlarged in 1898 to also take in the civil parish of Bletchley. The district was renamed from Fenny Stratford to the Bletchley Urban District in 1911. The urban district was further enlarged in 1934 to take in the parish of Water Eaton. As part of the 1934 reforms, the civil parishes within the urban district were merged into a single Bletchley parish matching the urban district.

In 1961, the parish and urban district of Bletchley had a population of 17,095. The parish was abolished on 1 April 1974 and became an unparished area of the Milton Keynes district. New civil parishes were created covering the area in 2001.

== Historical locations ==
=== Bletchley Park ===
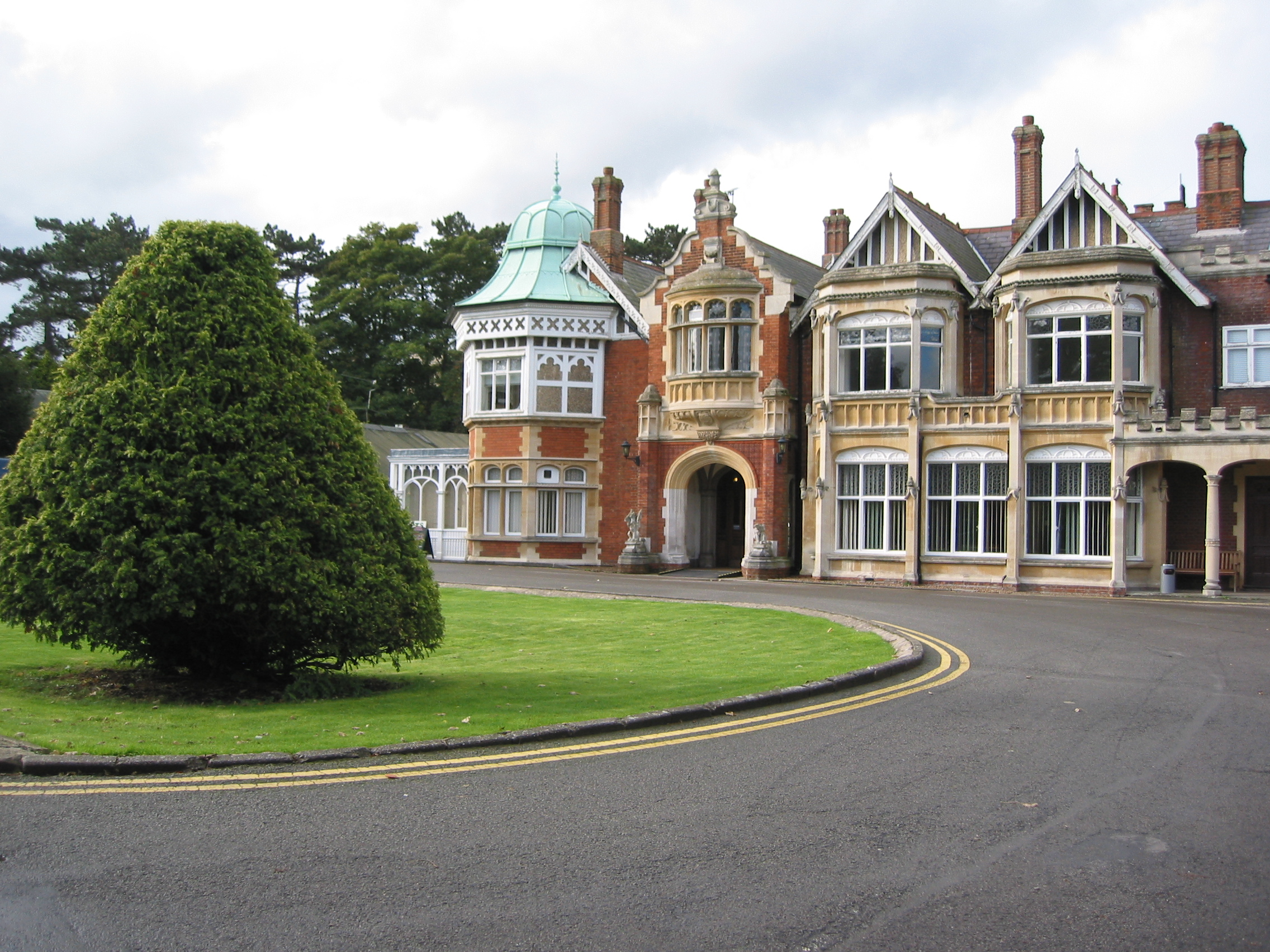
The main house at Bletchley Park

Within the West Bletchley parish, in the Church Green district, is Bletchley Park which, during the Second World War, was home to the Government Code and Cypher School. The German Enigma code was cracked here by, amongst others, Alan Turing. Another cipher machine was solved with the aid of early computing devices, known as Colossus. The park is now a museum, although many areas of the park grounds have been sold off for housing development.

=== Wilton Hall ===
The nearby Wilton Hall was built in 1943 as part of the Bletchley Park estate and was used by the government as a meeting place by day and a music and dance venue by night. After World War II, the venue continued to remain open and played host to musicians such as Lulu and The Rolling Stones.

In recent years, the building was slated for demolition after its closure in 2019. However, after residents and the local MP rejected calls for the demolition of the site due to historical value, the building was sold to a new partnership in 2020 which refurbished and reopened the building in 2022.

== Transport ==
=== Railway ===
Bletchley railway station lies on both the West Coast Main Line and the Marston Vale Line. Services to London Euston, Milton Keynes Central, Birmingham New Street, Northampton and Bedford are operated by London Northwestern Railway.

The Marston Vale line is a constituent part of the former Oxford-Cambridge Varsity Line that closed in 1967. However, a major project called East West Rail is underway to rebuild and reopen the route between Oxford and Cambridge. Since October 2024, the segment between Bletchley and Oxford has been ready for use; however, as of April 2026, passenger services have yet to commence due to an industrial dispute.

=== Road ===
Major Milton Keynes grid roads serving the town include Watling Street (which has the V4 designation between Denbigh North and Stony Stratford), V7 Saxon Street (connecting Central Bletchley with the rest of the city) and H8 Standing Way (A421) (which runs westwards towards Buckingham, the M40 and Oxford, and eastwards through the south-east of the city crossing and connecting to the M1 at Junction 13 and running towards Bedford, the A1 and Cambridge). The A5 passes along the eastern flank of Fenny Stratford, connecting it and Bletchley with the city centre, the A509, A422 and A508 roads. The A4146 southern bypass serves Water Eaton, Newton Leys and Fenny Stratford.

Watling Street, originally the Roman road between Dover and Wroxeter and serving Magiovinium (the Romano-British town that preceded Fenny, runs through Fenny Stratford and on through Stony Stratford).

=== Buses ===
Bletchley is Milton Keynes's main southern interchange point for cross-city and rural bus services. The town is served primarily by Arriva Herts & Essex and Red Rose Travel, which connect the area with Aylesbury, Luton Airport, the city centre and Wolverton.

The town's main bus station is on South Terrace, just east of V7 Saxon Street in Central Bletchley.

The city council also operates an on-demand bus service known as MK Connect, which serves the whole MK unitary authority area.

== Sport and leisure ==
Stadium MK, home of Milton Keynes Dons, is at the northern edge of the town. This area also contains what is known as the MK1 shopping centre, including shops, restaurants and an Odeon cinema.

The town has a second football club, Milton Keynes Irish F.C., as well as a rugby union club, Bletchley RUFC; both play at Manor Fields, just south of Fenny Stratford.

Bletchley Leisure Centre was completed in 2009, replacing the original 1970s building.
