= Stoke Hammond =

Coordinates: 51.9568°N 0.7190°W

- Village
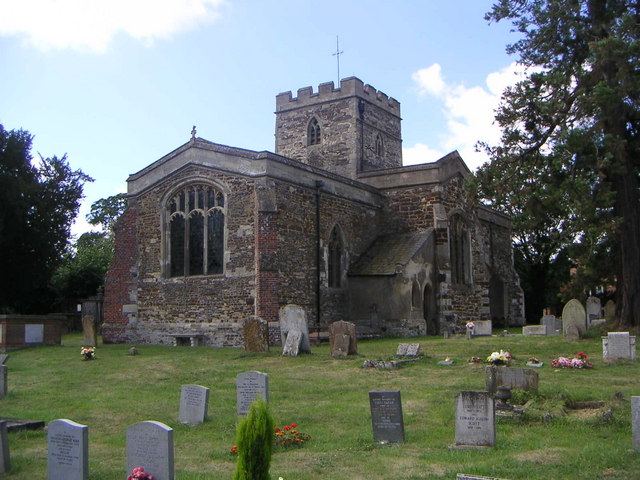
- St Luke's Church, Stoke Hammond

- Location within Buckinghamshire
- Interactive map of Stoke Hammond
- Population: 2,000 (2021 Census)
- OS grid reference: SP885295
- Civil parish: Stoke Hammond
- Unitary authority: Buckinghamshire
- Ceremonial county: Buckinghamshire
- Region: South East
- Country: England
- Sovereign state: United Kingdom
- Post town: MILTON KEYNES
- Postcode district: MK17
- Dialling code: 01525
- Police: Thames Valley
- Fire: Buckinghamshire
- Ambulance: South Central
- UK Parliament: Buckingham and Bletchley

Stoke Hammond (Old English: Stoche Hamon) is a historical English village and civil parish in the north of the county of Buckinghamshire. It is one of the 53 "thankful villages" which lost no men in World War I, as first identified by the writer Arthur Mee in the 1930s, and is the only thankful village in Buckinghamshire. The parish extends over 600 hectares and has a population of approximately 2,000.

The nearest train station is in Leighton Buzzard, offering fast trains both north and south to Milton Keynes Central and London Euston. The Grand Union Canal also passes close by. Until 2007, the A4146 ran through Stoke Hammond until the bypass opened.

Notable residents of Stoke Hammond have included David F. Kessler, former managing director of The Jewish Chronicle, as well as individuals with connections to Queen Victoria and the early Disney family. The village is also featured on Darren Hayman's album, Thankful Villages Volume 1.

== Village History ==
The settlement of Stoke Hammond can be traced back to well before the Norman Conquest, largely due to its access to a reliable water supply, notably at "Chaddle" (now Chadwell), located near the edge of Whaddon Chase forest.

The village was first recorded in the Domesday Book of 1086 as Stoche: a common place name in England denoting an Anglo-Saxon church or place of worship. The suffix Hammond was added later in manorial, referring to the Hamon family who owned the estate at the time of the Domesday survey. Stoke Manor was owned by Hamon Brito, son of Mainfelin Brito, in the 12th century. The manor later passed into the ownership of the Duke of Norfolk, with the family retaining possession into the Victorian era.

Over time, the village developed around five key farmhouses: Mount Pleasant, Tyrells, Grove, Moat, and Bridge. The Bridge farmhouse was once owned by Queen Victoria and remains a notable historic building. It justifiably deserves its conservation status and continued to be surrounded by working farmland.

== St Luke's Church ==
The parish church of Stoke Hammond is dedicated to St Luke, one of the four Evangelists of Christianity. 1,000 years ago a few inhabitants of Stoche built a church, and this has been an integral part of the community ever since. The earliest surviving part of the St Luke's Church was built by the Saxons, part of which can be seen at the eastern end of the south wall of the chancel.

The first recorded rector of Stoke Hammond was Richard de Tinton in 1220, who held this position until the reign of Henry III. By 1350, the church had adopted its present cruciform layout, with the chancel, central tower, and transepts being added during that period. The oldest bell in the church dates back to 1370. The church has had rectors who went on to become bishops, including Steven de Gravesend, who became Bishop of London in 1318.

In the 1920s, a violent thunderstorm struck the church, and a "ball of fire" shattered the east window and several others. In the aftermath, the present window was designed, depicting St Luke alongside a scene representing the village.

A detailed history of the church can be found in A Thousand Years, by author Pamela Murphy, available inside the church.

There is also a Methodist Chapel built in 1927 which is no longer in use.

== Tyrell's Manor ==
For over 600 years, Tyrell's Manor passed through the female line, often as the dowry of heiresses. The name was changed to Ingletons on the passing again by dowry, to Geoffrey Ingleton in 1465, and when their daughter married Humphrey Tyrell, who came from a noble family and was an ancestor of the famous hanging Judge, Tyrell, the estate took its present name.

The present house, built in 1708, had thirty-six windows, that were blocked up before the penal window taxes of a few years later. Built to the four points of the compass, this typical Queen Anne style architecture embodied all the fine craftsmanship of the time. The walls are 18 inches thick, oak beams 20 foot long and nearly 2 feet square throughout their length. The original wattle and daub plaster that has stood the test of time for over 250 years. It was built on the site of a previous house and the cellars are hundreds of years older than the existing building.

In the 1960s, an "Angus Dei" shield was found in a corner of the ancient cellar, which the Victoria & Albert Museum placed as late as the 14th century, likely part of the decoration of an earlier edition of the manor. This shield can be seen now on the window sill to the left of the altar in St Luke's church, and is where the village gets its shield emblem from.

== The Dolphin Pub ==
The Dolphin pub in Stoke Hammond has a long history. The earliest reference to the building dates back to 1695, with a conveyance mentioning two cottages. A later conveyance from 1823 refers to a cottage known as "The Dolphin" and a blacksmith's shop. The name is thought to have been chosen by a former ship's blacksmith who wanted to retain a connection to his maritime roots. The Dolphin officially became a public house in 1920.

== RAF Stoke Hammond ==
RAF Stoke Hammond operated as a secret wireless station from 1943 to 1973, providing vital communications support for Bletchley Park in World War II and RAF Stanbridge during the subsequent Cold War. The station has since been decommissioned and is now private property.
