= Fenny Stratford =

Constituent town of Milton Keynes, England

Coordinates: 51.998°N 0.715°W

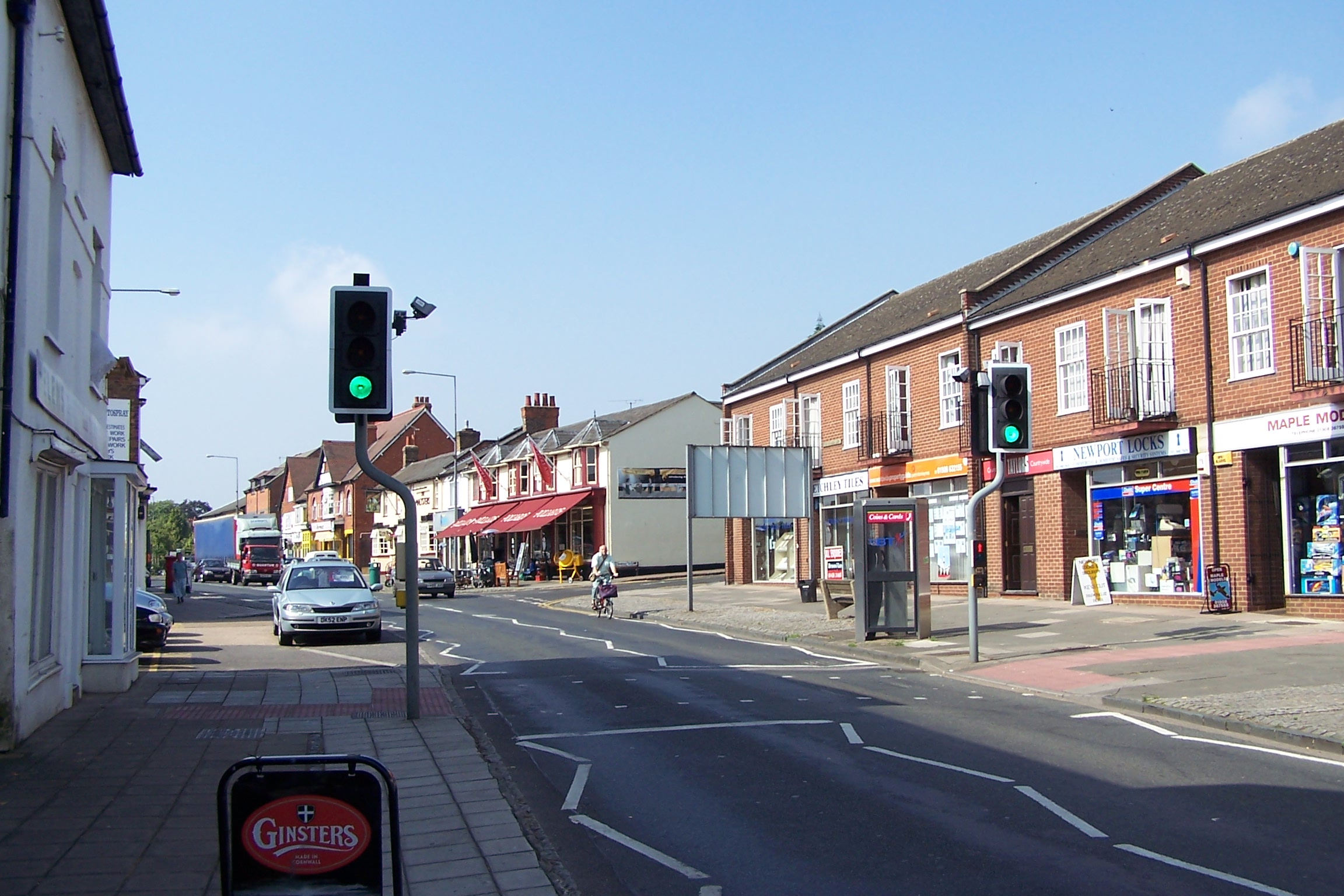
- Aylesbury Street

- Location within Buckinghamshire
- Interactive map of Fenny Stratford
- OS grid reference: SP882341
- Civil parish: Bletchley and Fenny Stratford
- District: City of Milton Keynes
- Unitary authority: Milton Keynes City Council
- Ceremonial county: Buckinghamshire
- Region: South East
- Country: England
- Sovereign state: United Kingdom
- Post town: Milton Keynes
- Postcode district: MK2
- Dialling code: 01908
- Police: Thames Valley
- Fire: Buckinghamshire
- Ambulance: South Central
- UK Parliament: Buckingham and Bletchley

Fenny Stratford is a constituent town of Milton Keynes, a city in Buckinghamshire, England. It is administered by Bletchley and Fenny Stratford, a civil parish under the Milton Keynes City Council. It is located around Watling Street, at the southern edge of the city, just east of Bletchley and west of the modern A5. It was included in Milton Keynes when the latter was designated in 1967.

== Today ==
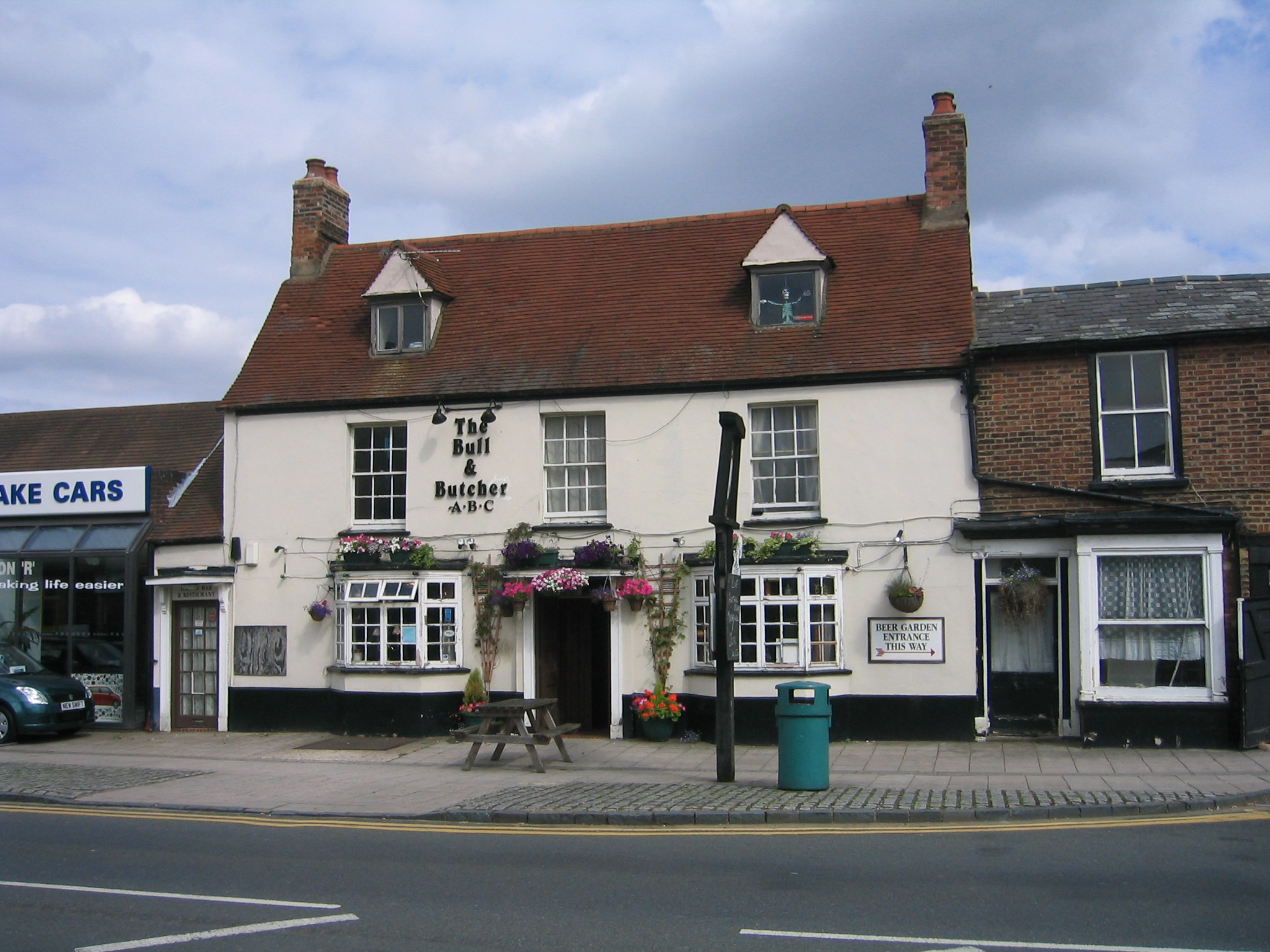
Bull & Butcher

A mixture of old buildings and new developments, Fenny Stratford is a small town on the edge of Milton Keynes. The market is no longer active, but the town still features a variety of shops, restaurants, pubs, newsagents, and hotels, primarily along Aylesbury Street. Pink Punters, an LGBT nightclub, is on Watling Street. Fenny Stratford railway station, one of the seven railway stations that serve the Milton Keynes urban area, is on the (Bletchley - Bedford) Marston Vale Line.

== History ==
The town name is an Old English language word that means 'marshy ford on a Roman road', referring to Watling Street. There are traces of the Romano-British settlement Magiovinium (or Magiovintum) at Dropshot Farm, on the edge of the present day occupation.

Possibly the oldest known gold coin in Britain was found here in 1849, a gold stater of the mid-second century BCE. Although known as the "Bletchley" hoards, two coin hoards were also found at or near the site of Magiovinium, consisting of silver denarii, in 1967 and 1987.

The town was recorded in manorial rolls in 1252 as Fenni Stratford. King James I awarded a market charter in 1608, formally making it a town.

Being an ancient market town, Fenny Stratford was the location of a weekly market for many years until 1665, when the town was badly hit by the bubonic plague. As a result, the main London-Chester route that ran through the town on Watling Street was diverted away from it, and the market ceased to exist. The market was never reinstated; the town was in ruins by the early eighteenth century, and had been joined with both Bletchley and Simpson, often being considered a hamlet of the former.

Fenny Stratford was formerly a chapelry. In 1866, Fenny Stratford became a separate civil parish. On 1 April 1934, the parish was abolished and merged with Bletchley. In 1931, the parish had a population of 4,602.

== Local government ==
From 1882 to 1891, Fenny Stratford was a civil parish in its own right. In 1895, it formed an urban district with Simpson, which expanded in 1898 to include Bletchley. (Note: called "Fenny Stratford" until 1911.) In 1974, it became part of the (then) District of Milton Keynes under Buckinghamshire County Council. (Note: The Borough of Milton Keynes subsequently became a Unitary Authority independent of the county council.)

== Parish church ==
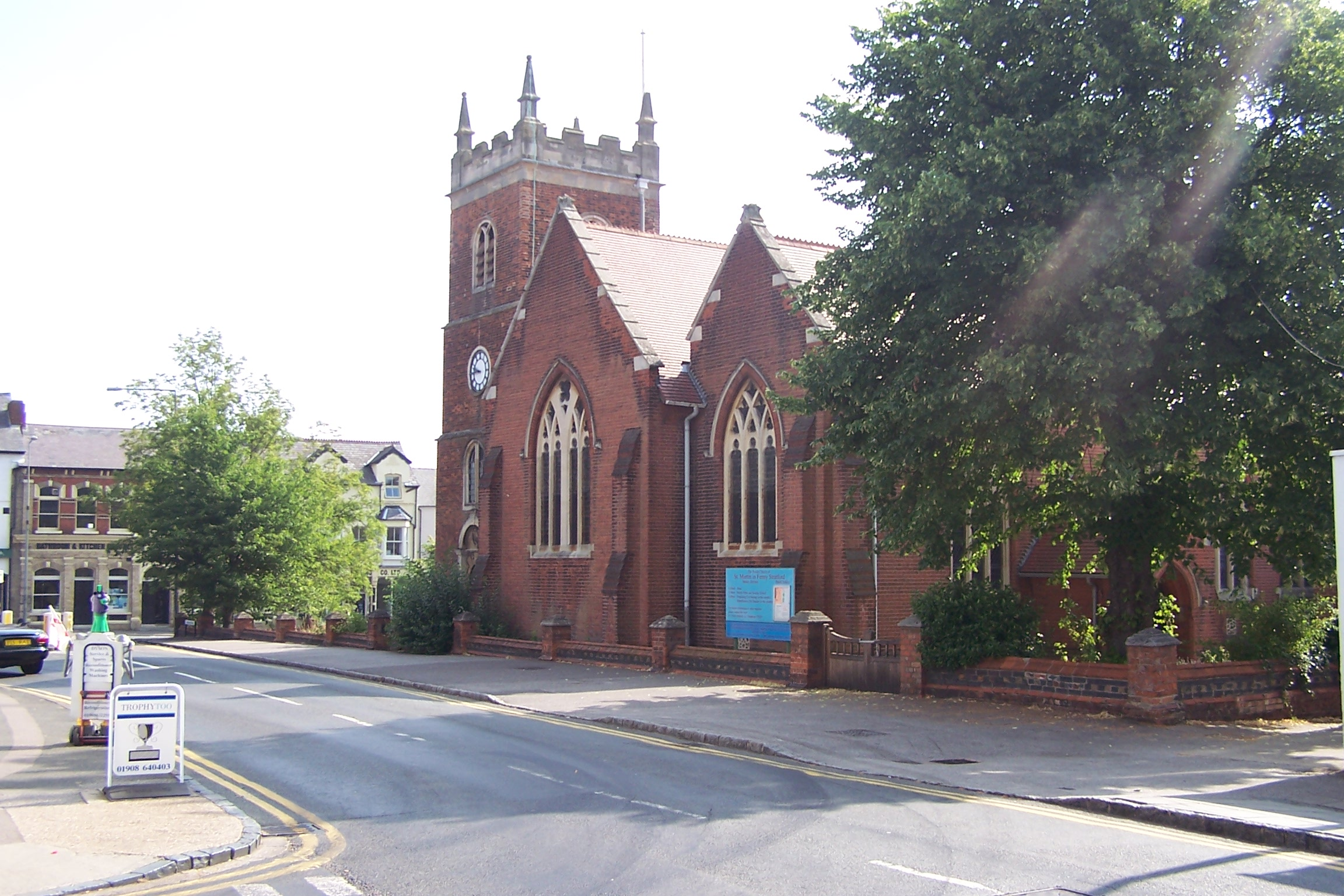
St Martin's Church

On St Martin's Day 1724, the first stone was laid of the new parish church of Fenny Stratford, marking a fresh start in the town's history. Browne Willis raised the funds for its construction. The church was built on the site of the old chantry chapel of St. Margaret and St. Catherine at Fenny Stratford.

Browne erected the church as a memorial to his grandfather Thomas Willis, a famous physician, who lived in St. Martin's Lane in the parish of St. Martin-in-the-Fields in London, and died on St. Martin's day, 11 November 1675. To perpetuate his own memory, Browne Willis arranged for a sermon to be preached at St. Martin's Church on each St. Martin's Day, for which a fee was payable. During his lifetime, he also celebrated the occasion with a dinner attended by local clergy and gentry, an event which continues to the present day.

=== The Fenny Poppers ===
The Fenny Poppers are six small ceremonial cannon which date from this time and are still fired ceremonially (with blank charges) today.

The exact date of their first use is unknown. In 1740, Browne Willis purchased a house on Aylesbury Street, and its rental income was used to fund both the sermon and the supply of gunpowder. After his death in 1760, these traditions continued and were later documented.

In 1859, all six Poppers were re-cast by the Eagle Foundry in Northampton after one of them burst. They remain in use today and were recently examined and x-rayed to confirm they are free of cracks. Over their long history, the battery has been fired from various locations, including the Canal Wharf, land behind the Church, St. Martin’s Hall, the Churchyard, and, most recently, the Leon Recreation Ground, which was once part of the Chantry lands.

The Poppers each weigh about 19 pounds (8.5 kg). The bore, 6" by 1¾" (152 mm x 44 mm) will take one ounce (28g) of gunpowder, which is plugged with well-rammed newspaper. They are fired three times on St. Martin's Day (11 November): noon, 2pm and 4pm. There is no connection with Remembrance Day (also 11 November). In 1901, they were fired to mark the death of Queen Victoria; the 81 salvoes were heard as far away as Olney.

On 1 January 2000, at 11am the Poppers were fired to mark the beginning of the second millennium.

At 2pm on 4 August 2000, a salute of six Poppers was fired to celebrate the 100th birthday of the Queen Mother.

At 2pm on 5 June 2012, a salute was fired to mark the Diamond Jubilee of Queen Elizabeth II.

== Invention of the Diesel Engine in Fenny Stratford ==
The world's first successful heavy oil engines were invented and built by Herbert Akroyd Stuart in Fenny Stratford. There is a plaque commemorating this at the westerly end of Denmark Street in Fenny Stratford opposite The Foundry public house – though the location of Akroyd Stuart's workshop is usually given as "Bletchley", which is a larger town adjoining Fenny Stratford.

== Waterways ==
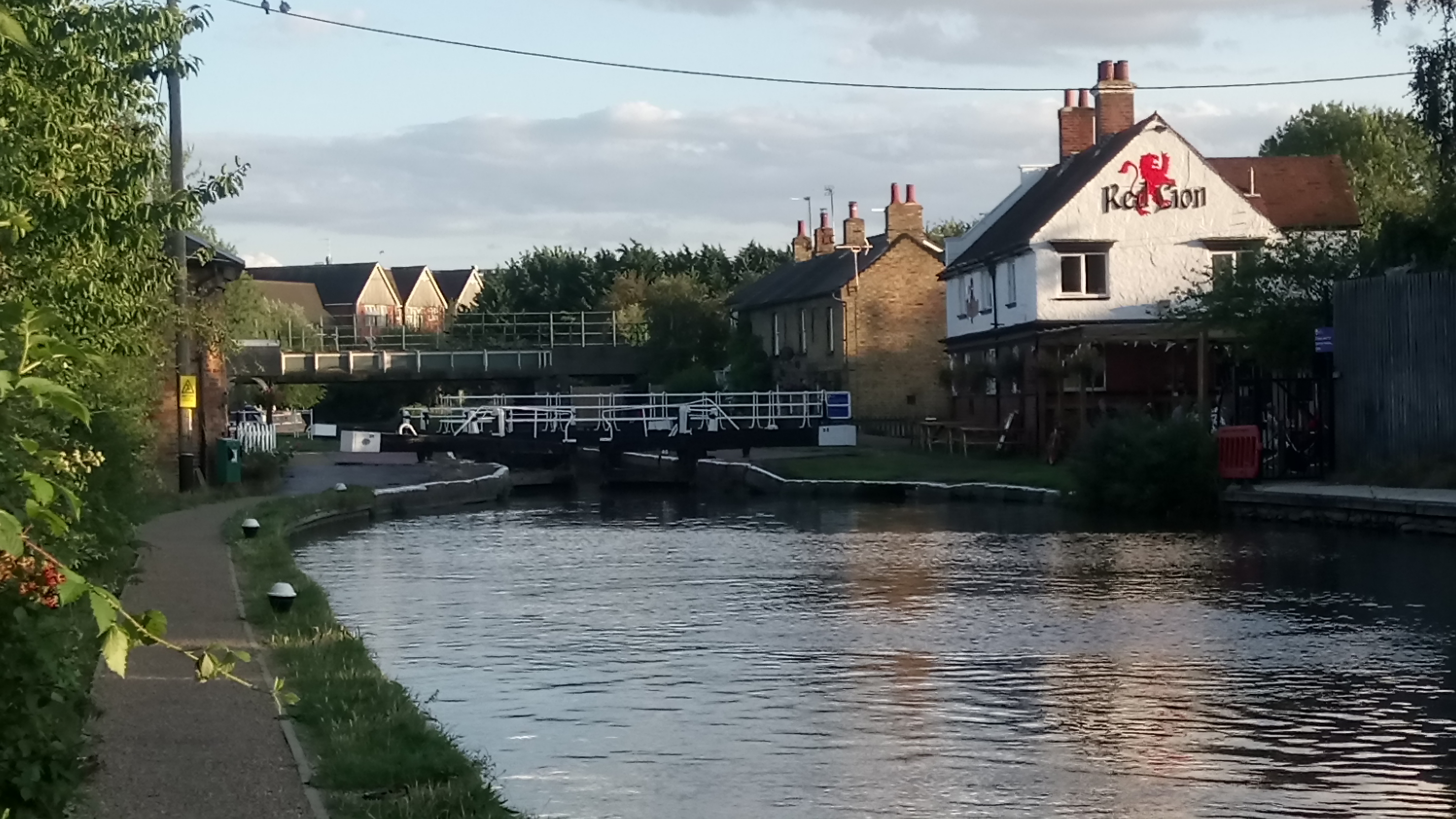
Fenny lock alongside the Red Lion pub

The Grand Union Canal runs through the southern outskirts of the town, and Fenny Lock is located in Simpson Road area to the east of Watling Street. It is notable both for the manually operated swing bridge which crosses the lock and for the very small rise in the lock (around 30 cm (12 in), the shallowest on the Grand Union Canal network). This was deemed necessary by the canal engineers because the next section northwards of the canal could not be made adequately watertight at reasonable cost without it.

The level persists from this lock for eleven miles, through Milton Keynes, and then to next lock at Cosgrove. A little further south of the canal bridge, Watling Street crosses the river Ouzel (a tributary of the river Great Ouse: it was the marshy ford across this river that gave the town its name.

Fenny Stratford is bordered by North Street, Bletchley Leisure Centre, Knowles School/Leon Recreational Ground and the Fenny Allotments from the west, the Rail line, Watling street and Denbigh East from the north, Water Eaton Brook by the south and the River Ouzel and Grand Union Canal from the east.

== Manor Fields ==
Manor Fields sports ground to the south of the town (and just across the Grand Union Canal from Bletchley's 'Trees' estate) is home to Milton Keynes Irish FC, Bletchley RUFC, the Irish Centre and other activities. The Roman town lay either side of Watling Street and thus Manor Fields lies on part of it.
