= Tickford (disambiguation) =

Tickford is an automotive engineering company.

Tickford may also refer to:

- Tickford Racing, team which competes in the Virgin Australia Supercars Championship
- Tickford in Newport Pagnell, Buckinghamshire, England; location of:
  - Tickford Priory, medieval monastic house
  - Tickford Bridge, 1810 iron bridge over the River Ouzel (or Lovat)
