= Tickford =

English automobile engineering company

Tickford Coachwork
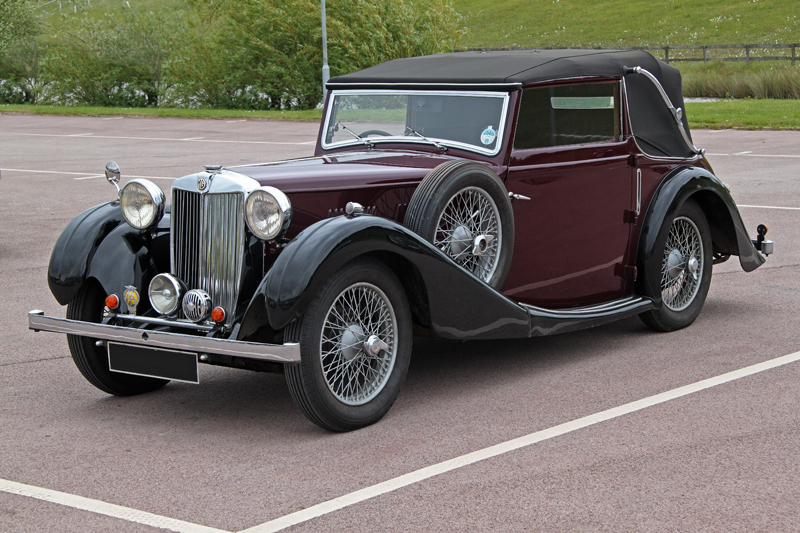
- Product type: Coachbuilder
- Country: United Kingdom

Tickford is an automobile engineering and testing business in Newport Pagnell, Buckinghamshire, known for tuning and such products as the 140 mph Tickford Capri.

Under the name Salmons & Sons and their Tickford products the firm has an almost two century-long history of coachbuilding.

== History 150 years of coachbuilding ==
=== Salmons & Sons ===
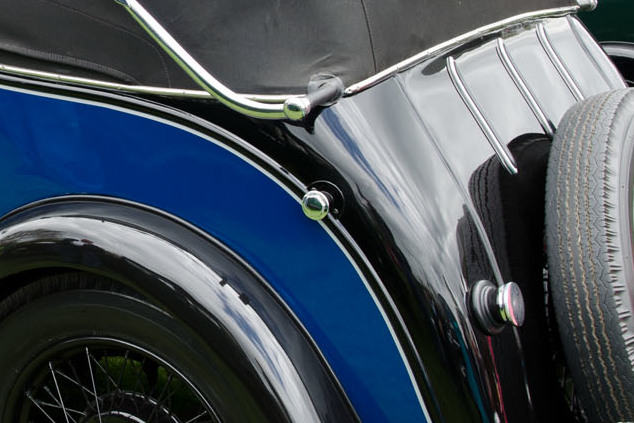
Salmons & Sons' patent Tickford winding gear. A crankhandle winds the roof up or down

Tickford Limited grew from the very substantial coachbuilding business founded in the 1820s by Joseph Salmons later known as Salmons and Sons at Tickford on the east side of Newport Pagnell. Their products bore the brand-name Tickford. With the advent of the internal combustion engine, Salmons & Sons progressed into developing coachbuilt cars as early as 1898 and prospered. In 1925 they announced their Tickford "All Weather" body, a drophead with the hood mechanism operated by inserting and turning a handle in the rear quarter-panel.

During the 1930s Salmons built standard catalogued Tickford drophead bodies for: BSA, Daimler, Hillman, Lanchester, MG, Rover, Standard, Triumph, Vauxhall and Wolseley.

By the late 1930s 450 people were employed producing 30 car bodies a week. Their London showrooms were at 6–9 Upper Saint Martin's Lane WC2.

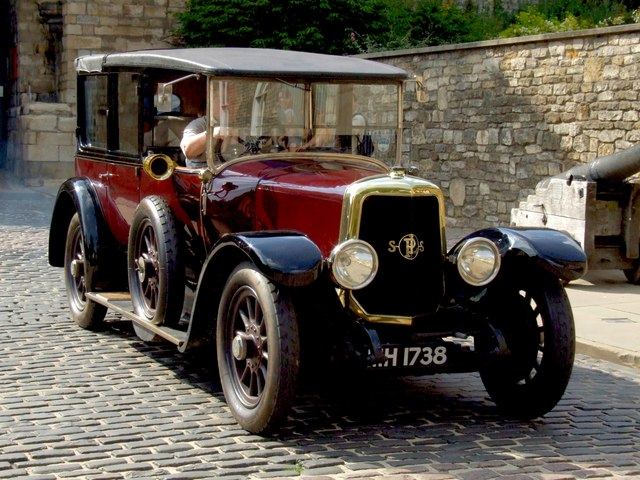
Panhard-Levassor
1924

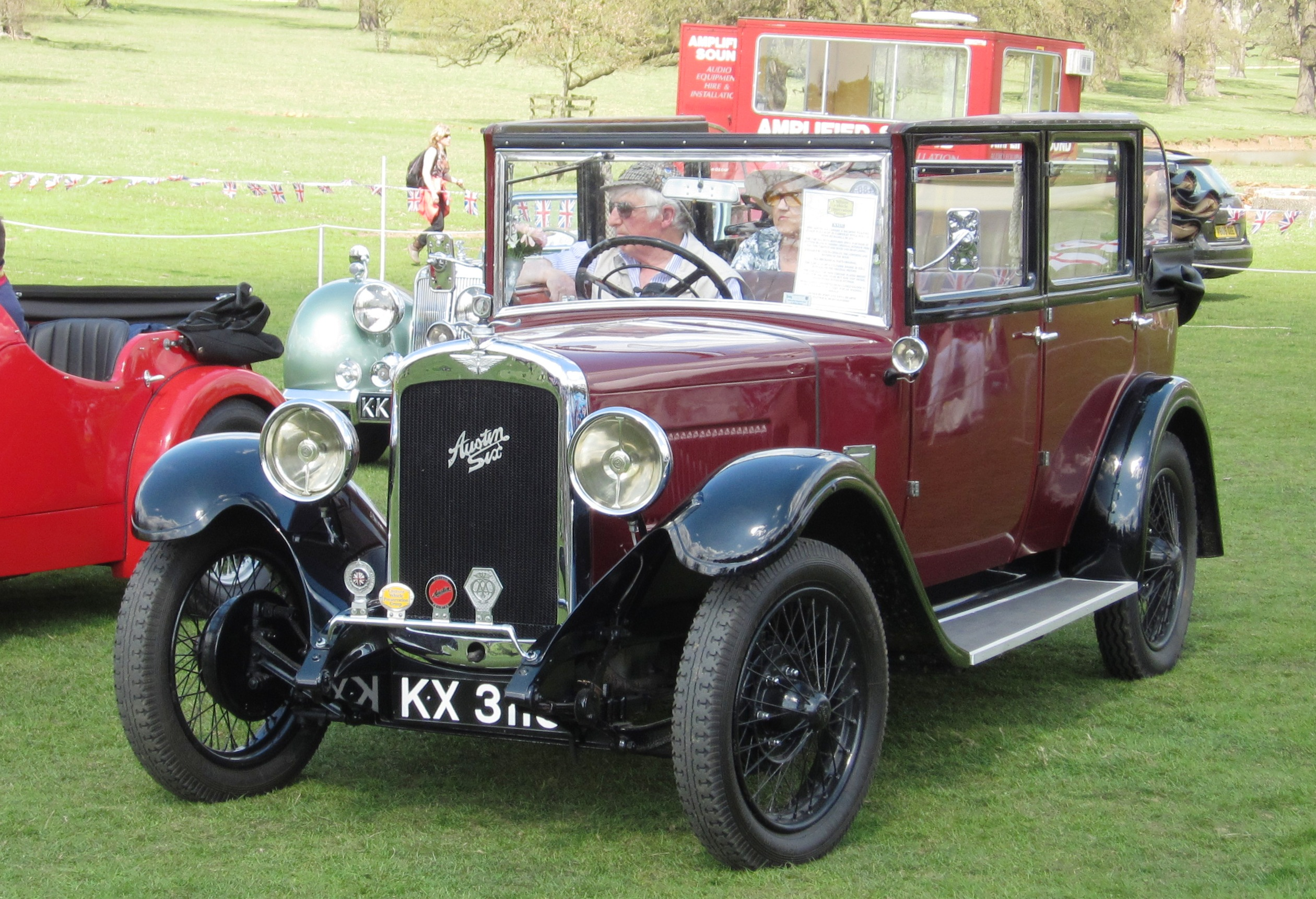
Austin Sixteen Light Six
1929

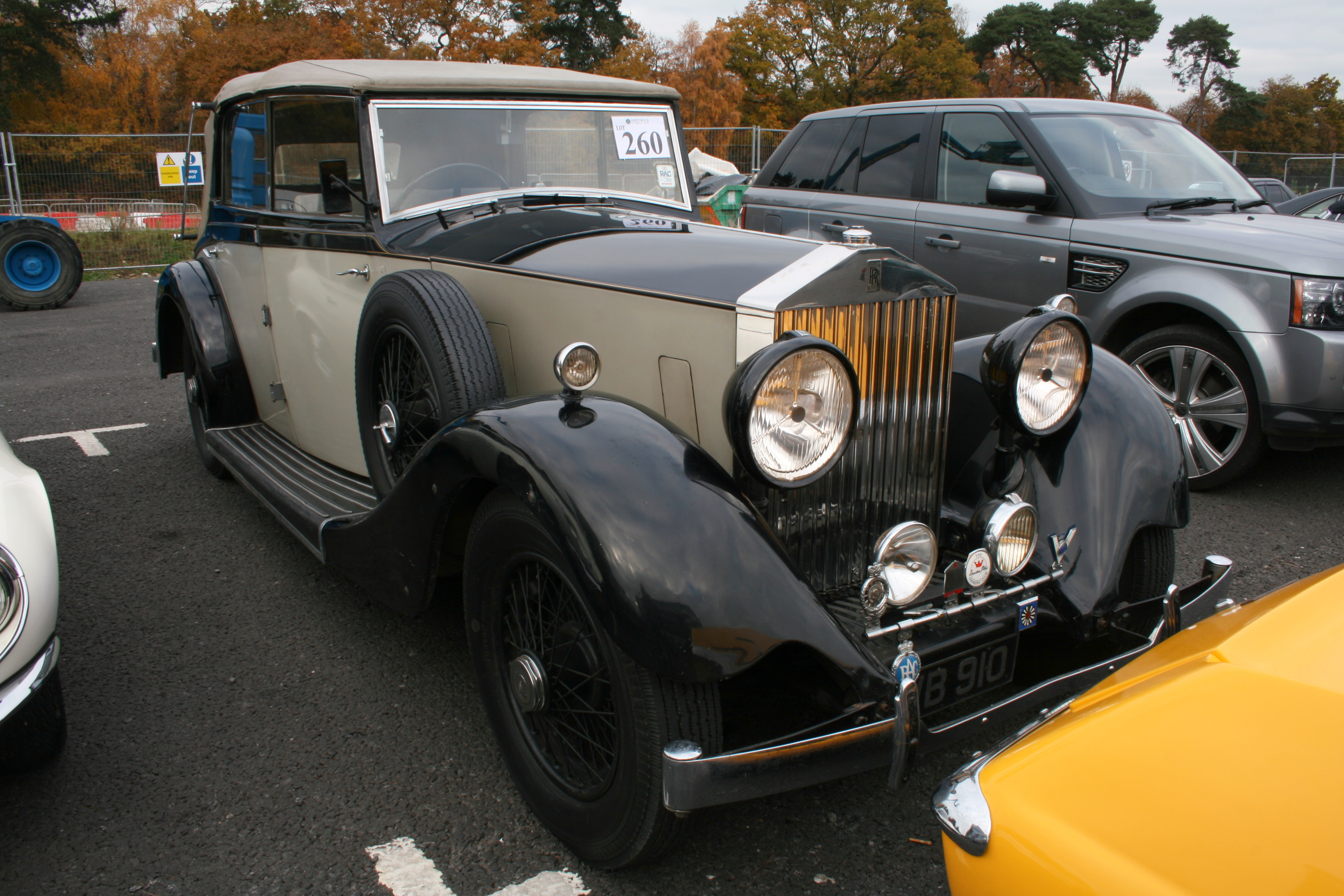
1935 Rolls-Royce 20-25

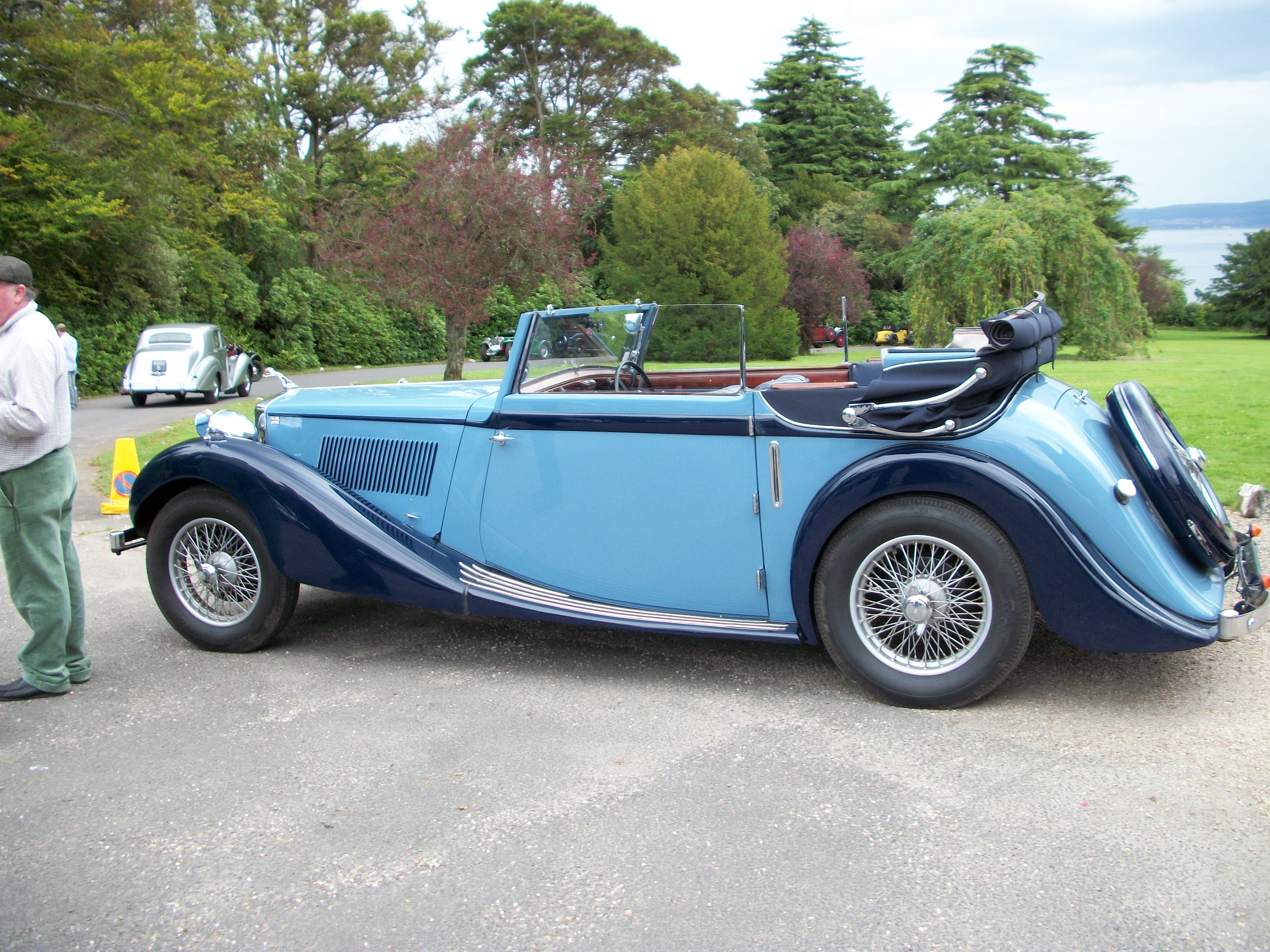
MG SA
1938

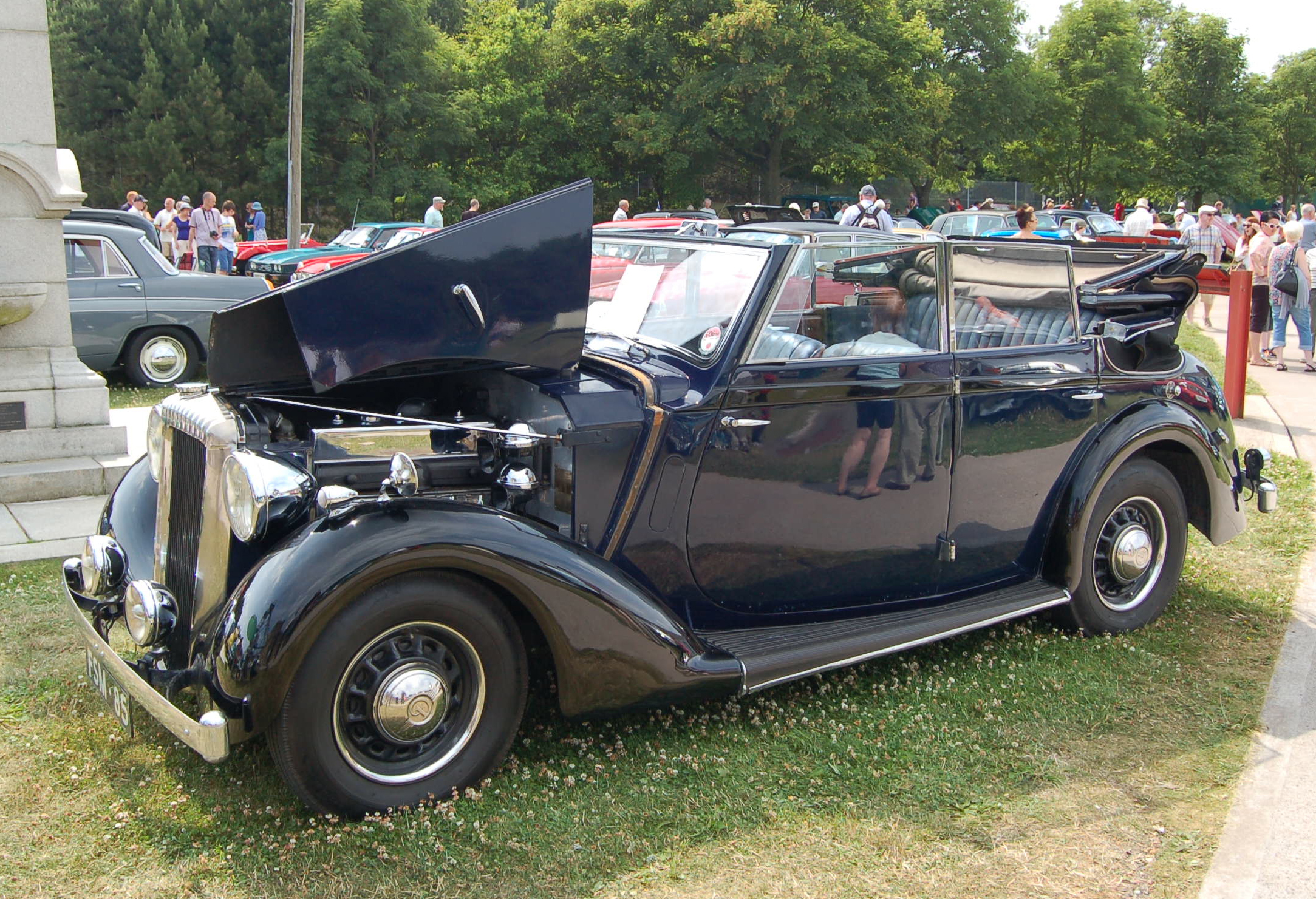
Daimler Eighteen
1940

== Tickford Limited ==
In 1943 following Ian Boswell's purchase of Salmons & Sons Limited the company changed its name to its trademark, Tickford Limited.

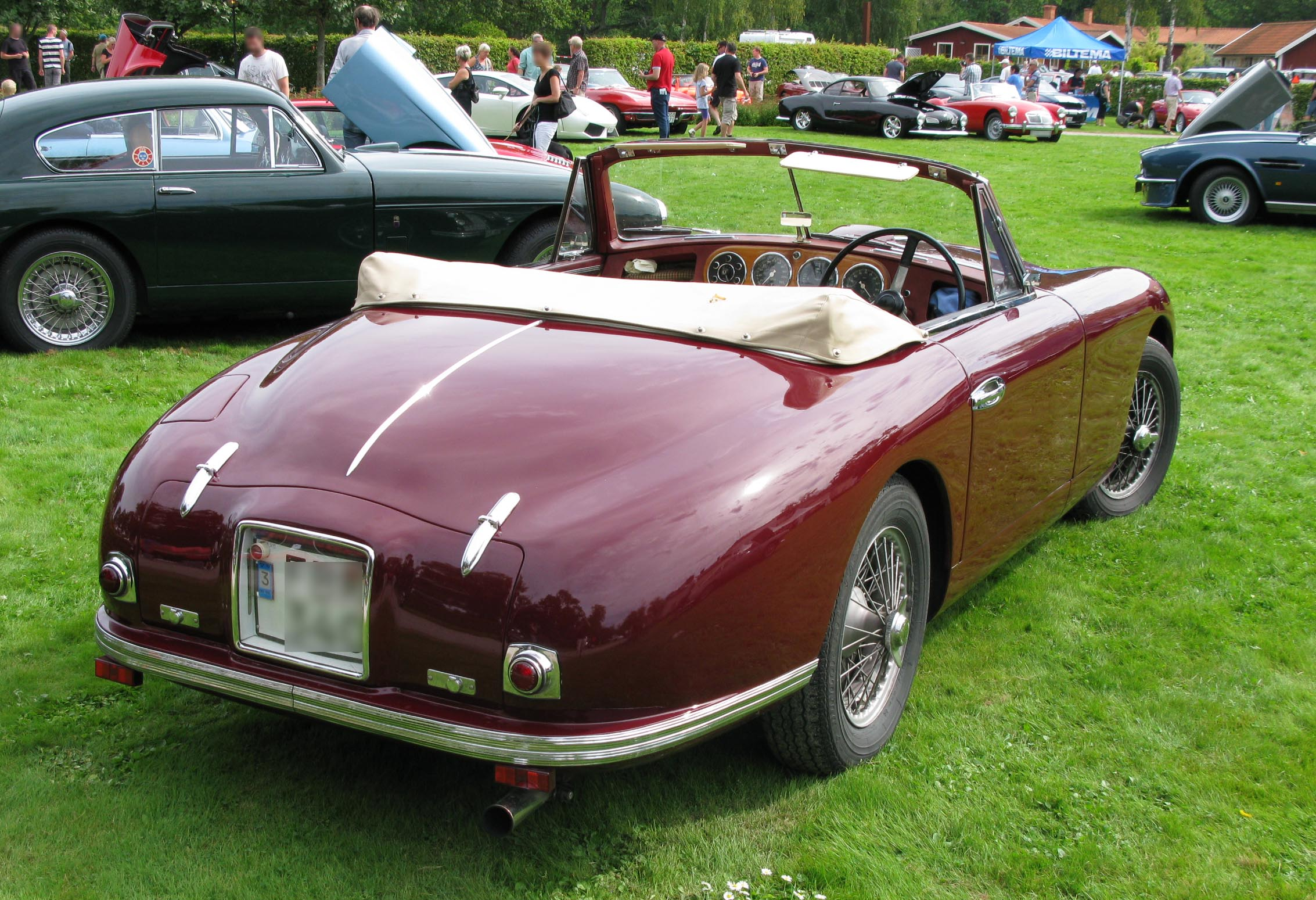
Aston Martin 2.6 litre
1951

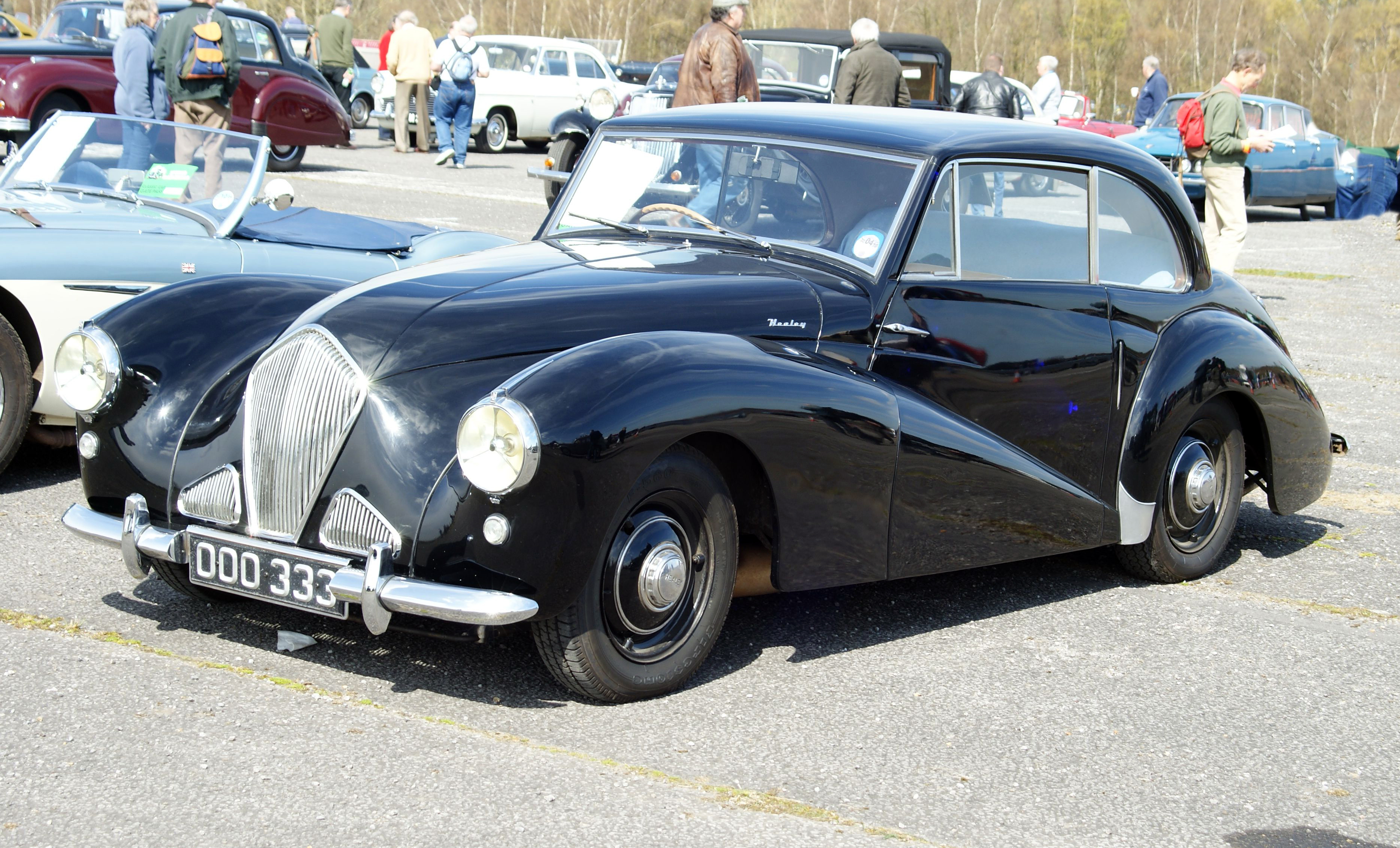
Healey
1952

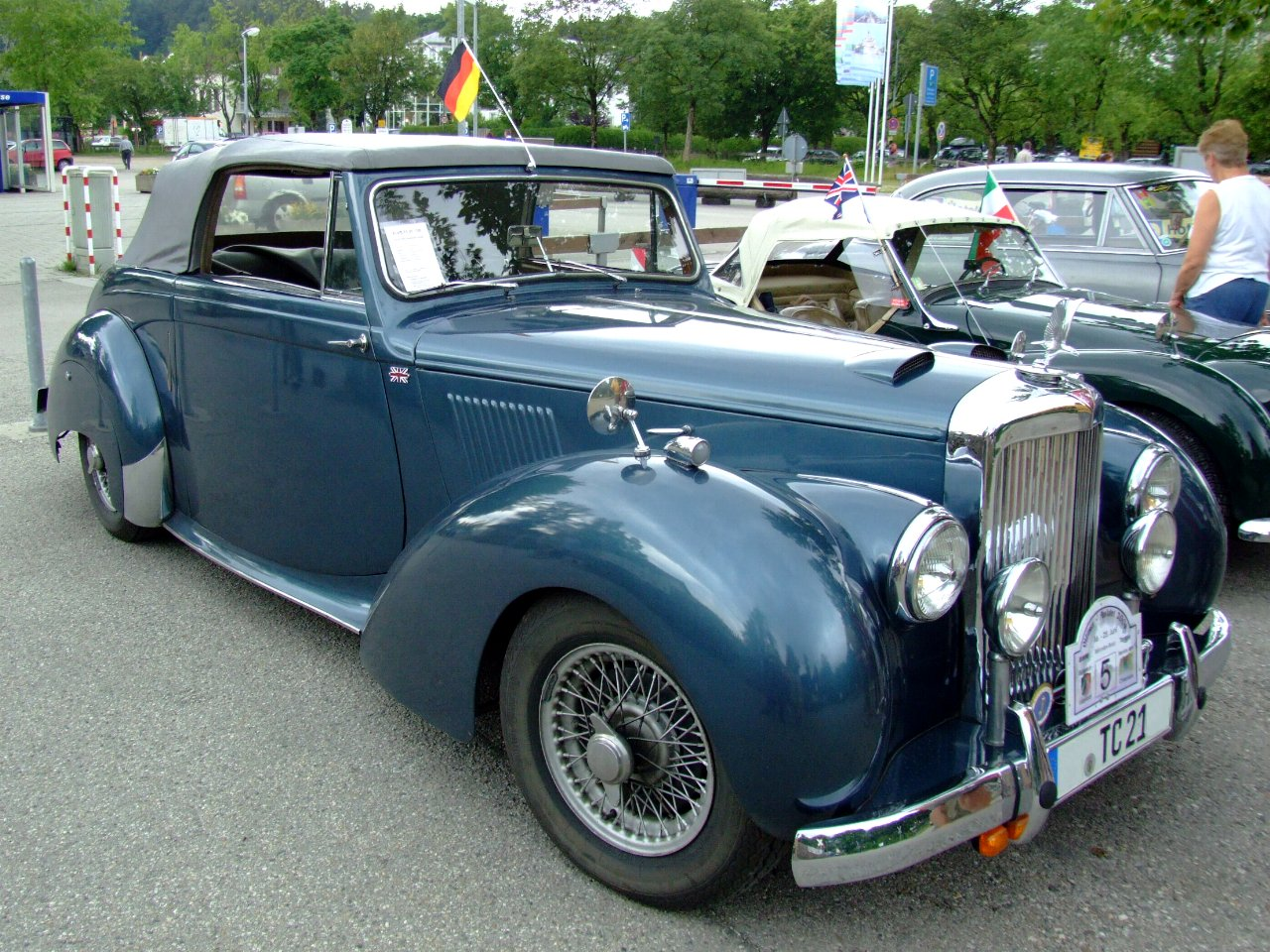
Alvis TC 21-100
1952

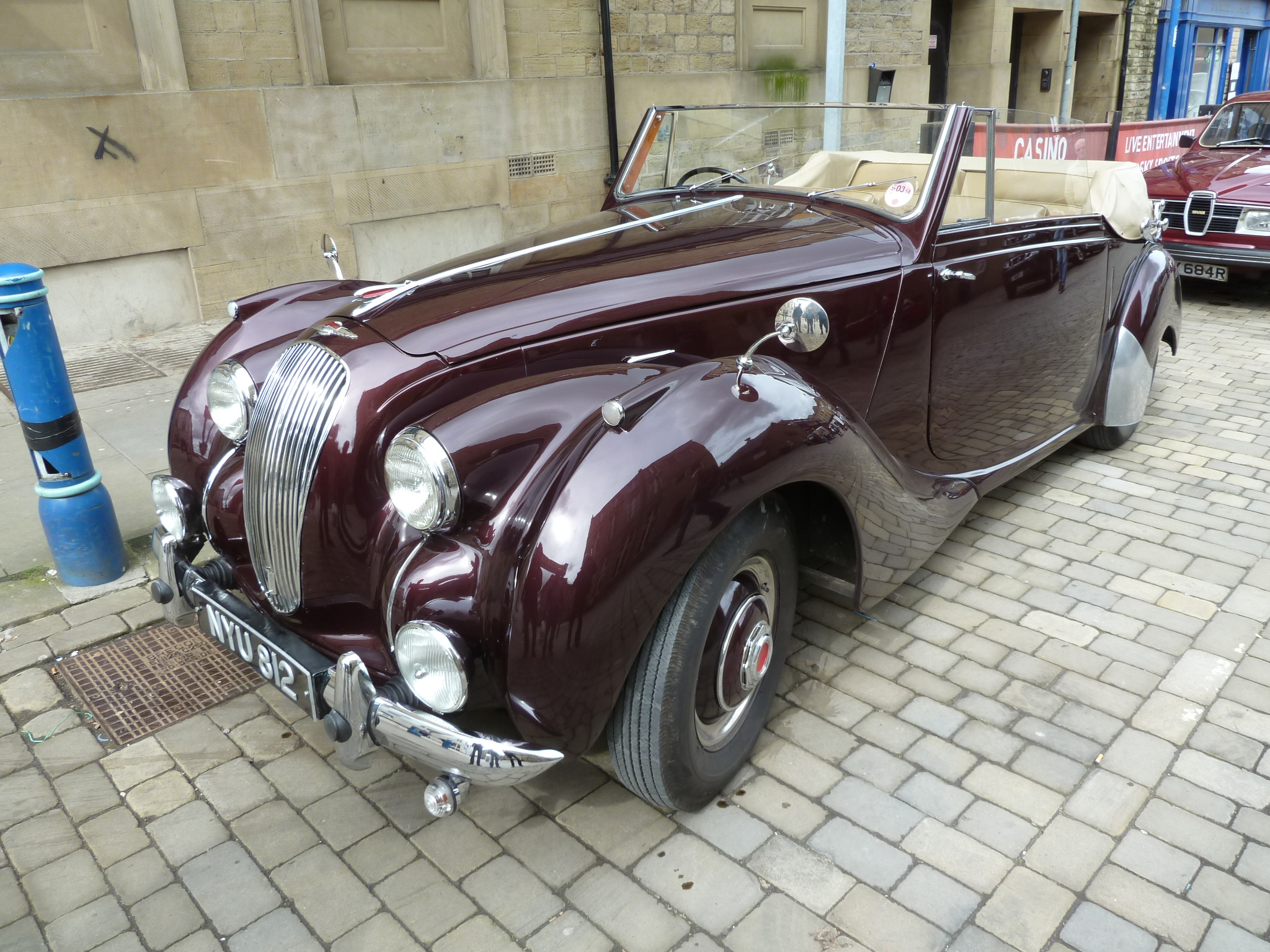
Lagonda 2.6 litre
1953

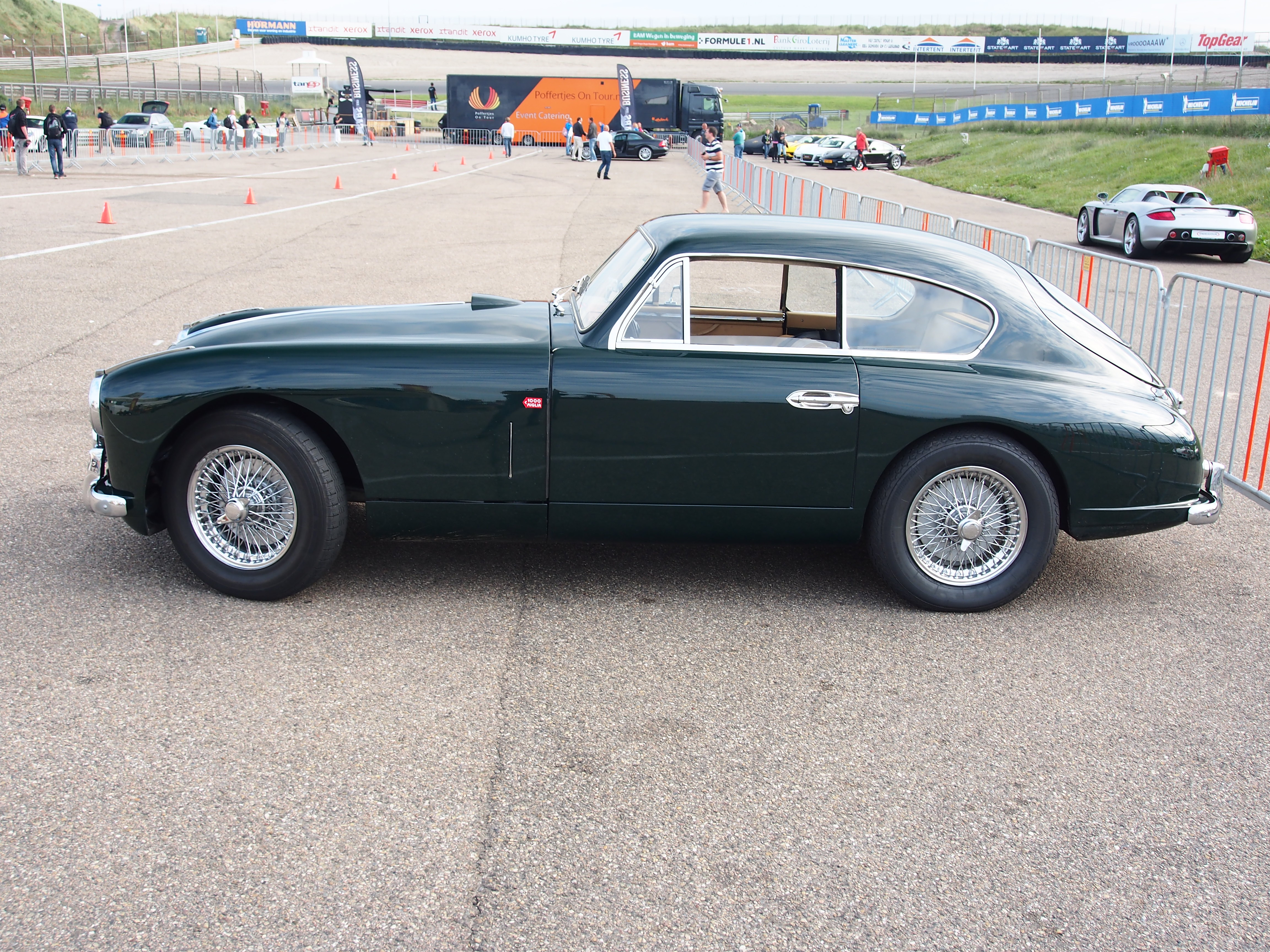
Aston Martin 2.6 litre
1954

=== 1955–1981: Aston Martin Lagonda ===
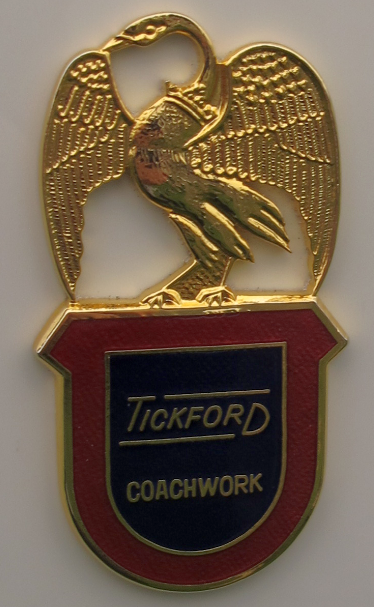
A badge believed to have been placed on bodies of this era

In late 1955 Tickford Limited was bought by David Brown, owner of Aston Martin since 1947 and Lagonda since 1948 both always fitted with Tickford bodies. He soon moved Aston Martin onto the site at Tickford Street where it remained until Ford moved DB7 production to Bloxham and then to Gaydon for the DB9 and DBS.

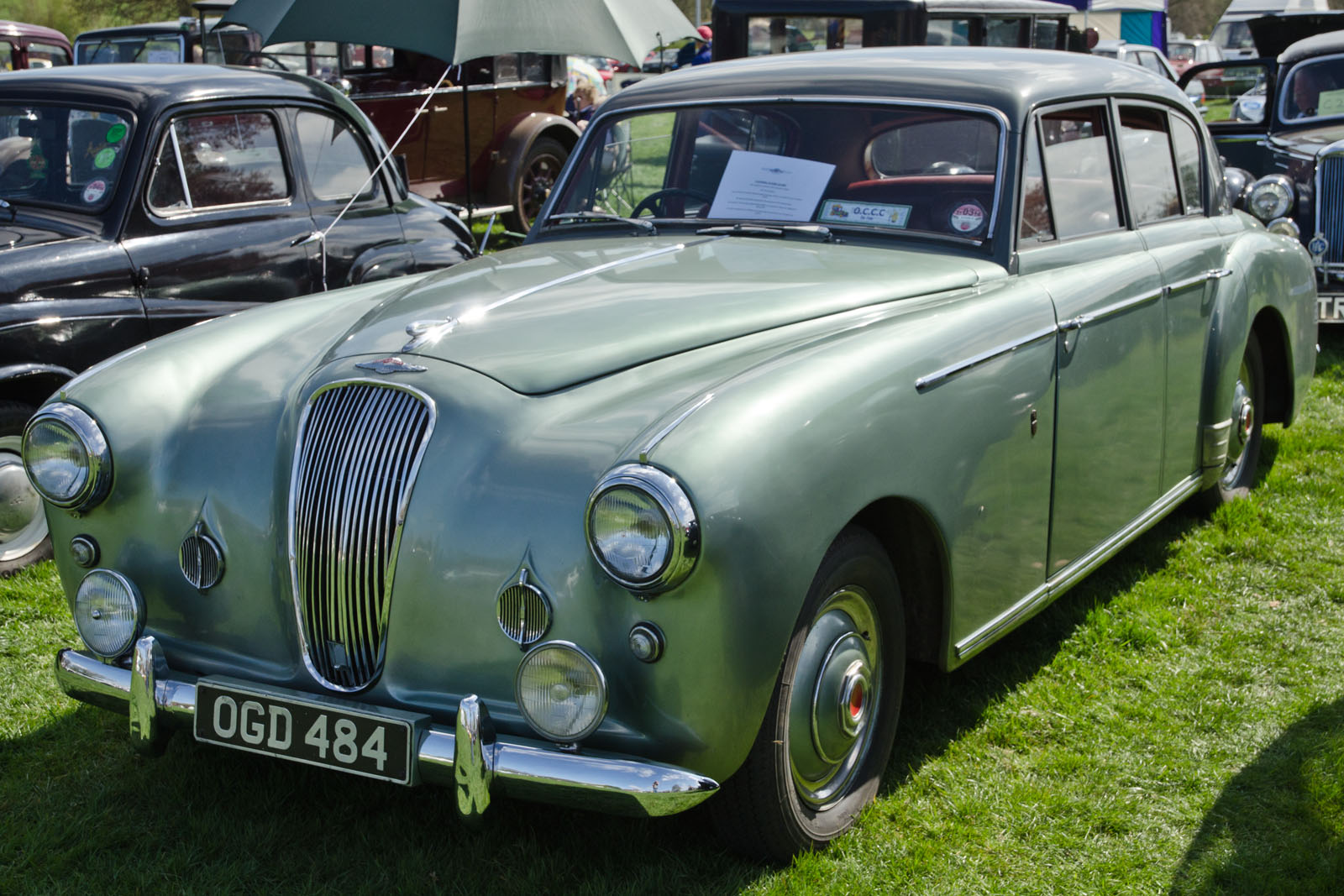
Lagonda 3 Litre
1955

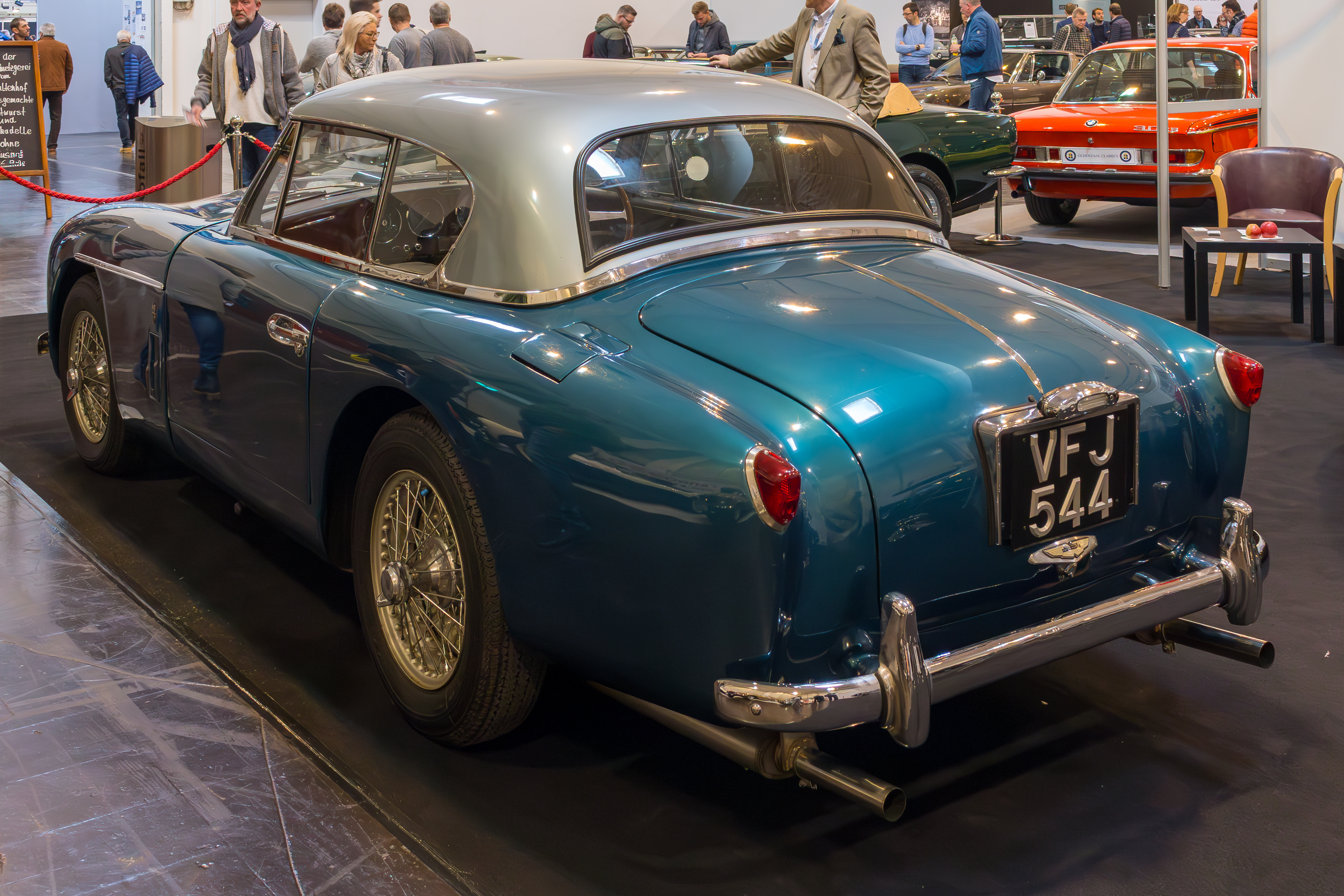
DB 2/4 Mark II Fixed Head Coupe
1956

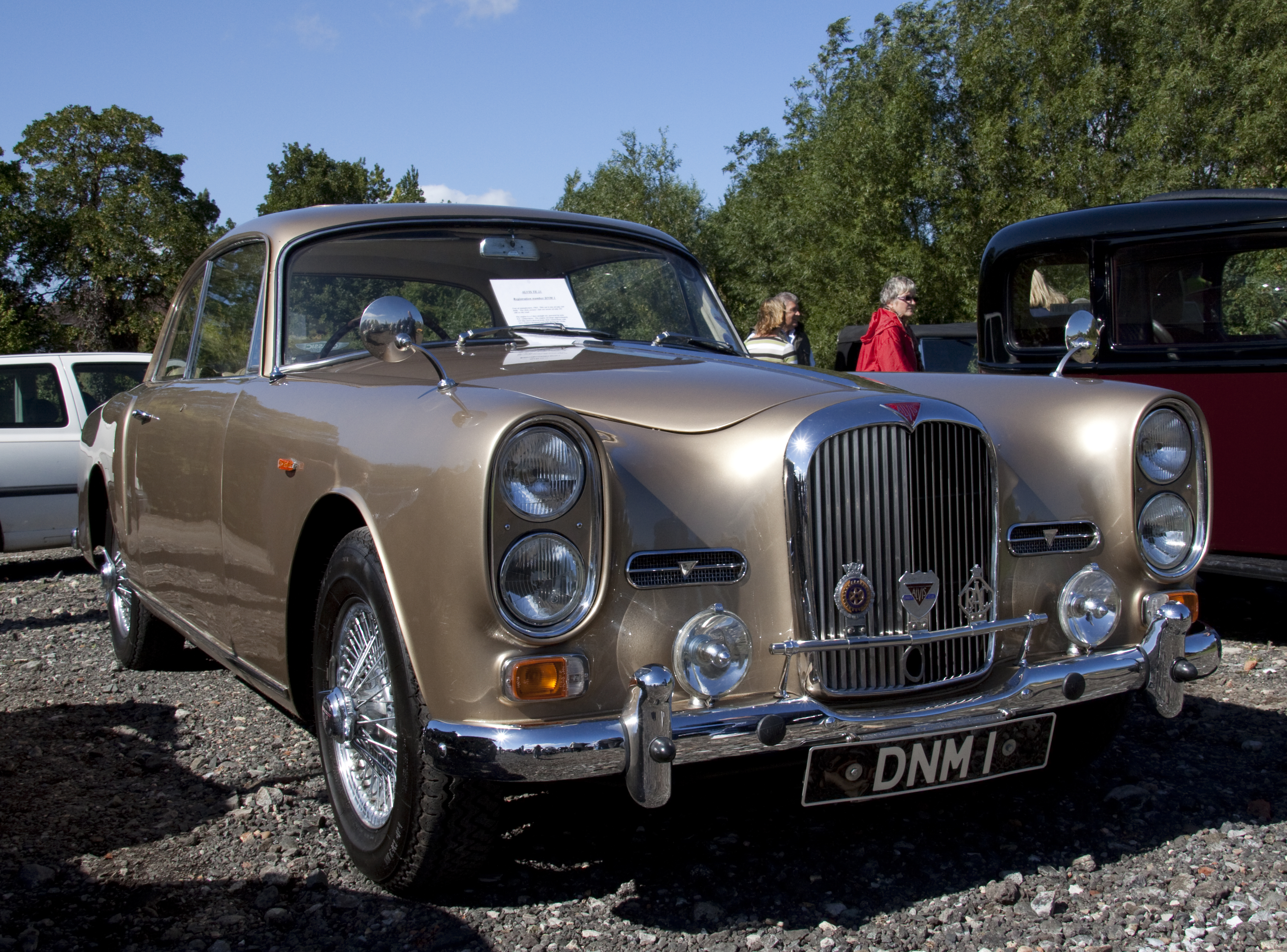
Alvis 3 Litre
1965

== Subsequent brand name use ==
=== 1981–1990: CH Industrials ===
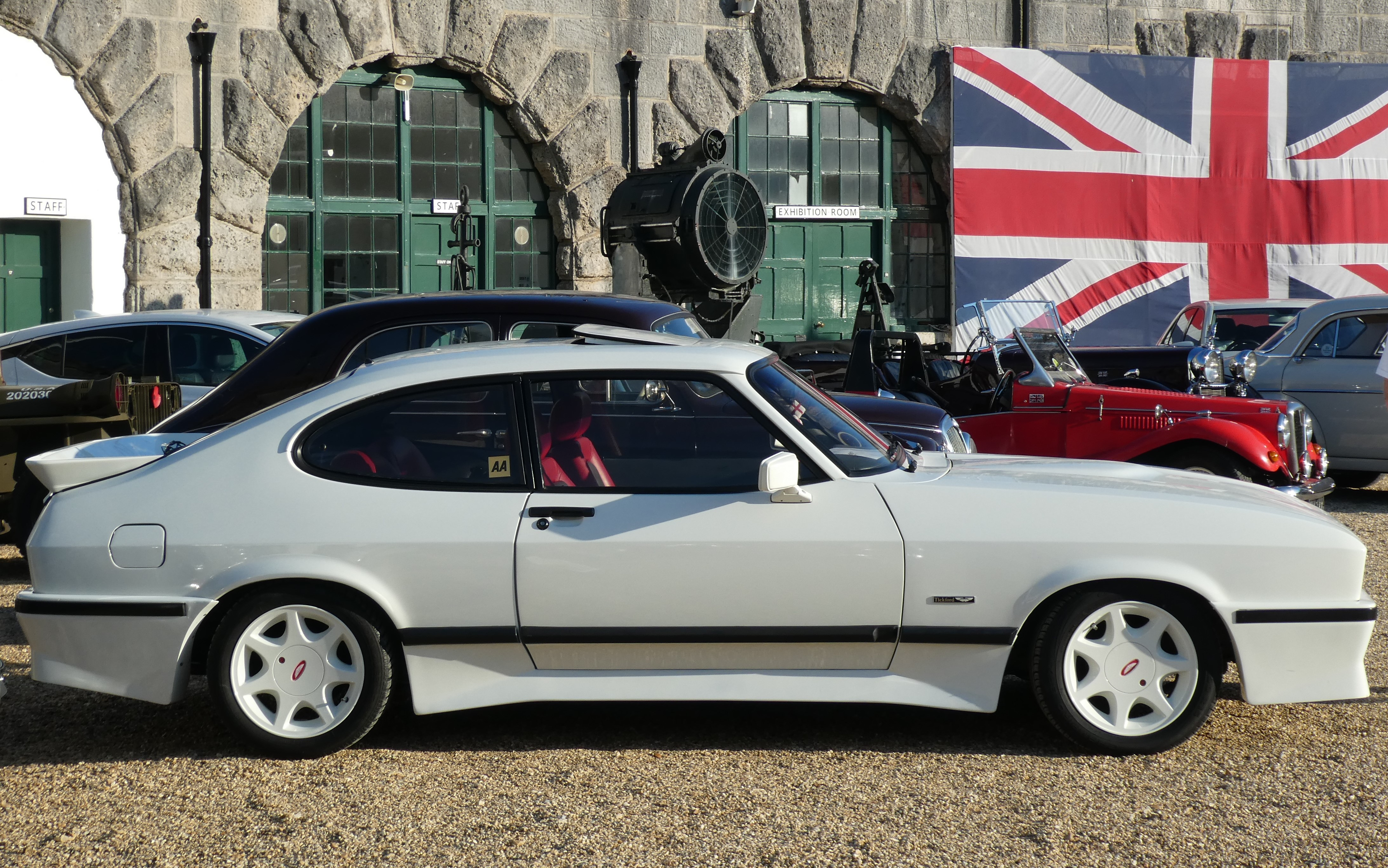
Tickford Capri (1984)

In 1981 Aston Martin created an engineering service subsidiary and chose the name 'Aston Martin Tickford'. With the changing fortunes of Aston Martin, the company moved into a purpose-built facility in Milton Keynes under the separate ownership of CH Industrials plc and despite carrying out a lot of unseen, "back-room" engineering projects for major manufacturers, gained most publicity from adding engineering and tuning to its coachbuilder roots allowing it to develop special products like the 140 mph, turbocharged Tickford Capri for Ford. After the Capri, Tickford worked with among others, MG to create the Maestro Turbo and Ford to create the road-going Sierra Cosworth RS500 and the homologated version of the RS200. These vehicles were made in a factory set up near Coventry and a railway division was set up in Nuneaton to design interiors for underground and mainline train carriages.

The roof of the Jaguar XJS cabriolet was also designed by Tickford. These cars were originally converted by Tickford themselves, but it was so successful that Jaguar set up a convertible production line to cope with demand.

=== 1990–2001: Independence ===
During the collapse of the CHI Group in 1990, the directors of Tickford executed a buy-out and saved Tickford from going into receivership, partially funded through the sale of the railway division to Babcock International. Tickford was now back in its roots of engine and vehicle engineering and worked on developing new markets. The company won projects in Detroit and the Far East and set up liaison offices in the US and Germany.

Tickford set up a production line in Daventry to convert the Ford Puma into the limited edition Ford Puma Racing (just 500 were built) and did most of the engineering design and development of the Ford Focus RS at Milton Keynes, also providing a build facility next to Ford's Saarlouis plant.

==== Tickford Vehicle Engineering & Ford Tickford Experience ====
After a worldwide search, Ford Australia selected Tickford as a joint-venture partner, resulting in Tickford Vehicle Engineering Pty Ltd (TVE) being established in 1991 as the high performance car division of Ford in Australia.

TVE is best known for building the Ford Falcon XR6 and XR8 models for Ford. It also engineered a range of higher performance cars, the T-Series with TE50 & TS50 models based on the Ford AU Falcon and the TL50 derived from the Ford AU Fairlane. The FTE T-Series models were launched in October 1999 under the FTE name, FTE being an acronym for Ford Tickford Experience. The "T-Series" was produced in very limited numbers with 842 built (including pre-production press vehicles). The third series, known as the T3 was the final resting place for the Ford Windsor V8 engine and the last model from TVE.

=== 2001–2005: Prodrive ===
In 2001 the whole Tickford Group in UK, Germany, Australia and USA, was acquired by Prodrive, the British motor sport company and, in 2002, its Australian joint venture with Ford, Tickford Vehicle Engineering, was rebranded as Ford Performance Vehicles. The Tickford name disappeared again.

=== 2006–2012: Tickford Powertrain Test ===
In December 2006, the management team of Prodrive Test Technology, running the former Tickford site at Milton Keynes, purchased the business from Prodrive, renaming it Tickford Powertrain Test. The company now focused on the independent engine and vehicle testing needs of vehicle manufacturers, component companies and the catalyst and petroleum industries. In June 2007, the company acquired Scott Gibbin Ltd, a Peterborough-based engine test and development company. In the spring of 2009 the Peterborough site was closed and the work transferred to the Milton Keynes facility in Tanners Drive.

=== 2013–2015: Intertek ===
Intertek Group plc, a provider of Assurance, Testing, Inspection and Certification services to a wide range of industries worldwide, acquired Tickford Powertrain Test on 31 December 2012 from its management shareholders. Traded as Intertek Tickford for 12 months and then latterly just Intertek..

=== 2016-present: Tickford Australia ===
In 2016, through Prodrive, Tickford returned to the Australian automotive market. Offering high performance upgrades to the Ford Mustang, Ranger and Everest.This was as a result of Ford Australia shutting down local production, ending the Falcon model and discontinuing the Ford Performance Vehicles brand.

== Motorsport ==
Tickford built on its engine performance heritage with the development of V8 racing engines for Aston Martin. These were raced in Nimrod and EMKA chassis and powered Nimrod to third place in the 1983 World Endurance Championship for Makes. Tickford also developed Cosworth engines for Ray Mallock Racing and Ecurie Ecosse, with the latter gaining second place in the C2 Class of the 1987 World Sports Prototype Championship for Teams.

In the late 1980s Tickford designed, developed and built Formula One engines, including some with unique 5-valve cylinder heads. A Tickford 5v version of the Judd V8 was commissioned by Camel Team Lotus for Nelson Piquet and Satoru Nakajima to use.
