= George Walters (VC) =

Recipient of the Victoria Cross

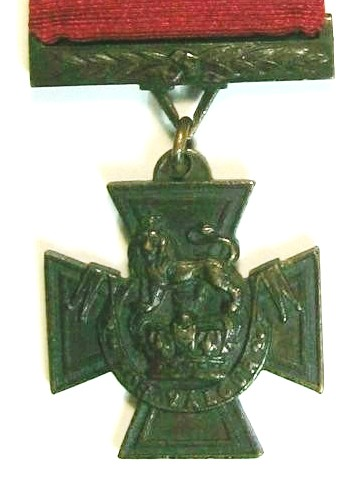
- George Walters' VC
- Born: 15 September 1829; Newport Pagnell Buckinghamshire
- Died: 3 June 1872 (aged 42); Marylebone, London
- Burial place: East Finchley Cemetery, London
- Military career
- Allegiance: United Kingdom
- Branch: British Army
- Service years: Enlisted 1848
- Rank: Sergeant
- Units: 49th Regiment of Foot
- Conflicts: Crimean War
- Awards: Victoria Cross
- Other work: Metropolitan Police officer

George Walters VC (15 September 1829 – 3 June 1872) was an English recipient of the Victoria Cross, the highest and most prestigious award for gallantry in the face of the enemy that can be awarded to British and Commonwealth forces.

== Background ==
George was born on 15 September 1829 in Newport Pagnell, Buckinghamshire. His father was James Walters, an Innkeeper in that town. His mother was Jane Green. George was the third child of seven. There are no records of George’s early life and we can only speculate his reasons for joining the Army. 'Going for a soldier' in early-Victorian England was still not a respectable thing to do but, as industrialism spread, so there was less need for men on the land and unemployment began to be a factor.

== 49th Regiment ==
The British Army alone was an all-volunteer force, whose soldiers enlisted for an initial period of ten years in the Infantry. George Walters joined the 49th Regiment of Foot in 1848 and was promoted to the rank of Sergeant within six years.

== Crimea ==
On 5 November 1854, the Russians marched out of the besieged city of Sebastopol to throw off the allied British and French forces by mounting a joint attack with their troops from outside the city. Despite outnumbering their enemies five to one the Russians failed to achieve what looked to be a foregone conclusion. This was the third major action of the Crimea War. The battle fought in heavy fog at Inkermann proved to be a testament to the skill and initiative of the individual men and officers of the British Army of the day. Inkermann was an infantry battle of the Crimean War, when the Russians attacked the British forces besieging Sebastopol under cover of fog. In the battle 8,000 British soldiers sustained a hand-to-hand combat with 50,000 Russian troops and it was always referred to as "the soldiers' battle".

Very early in the morning, the Russians came out again, this time in much greater strength, and made for the British positions on the Inkermann ridge. The morning was wet and misty, and the visibility was so bad that the British were surprised and had to scramble into action piecemeal. There was little higher control. The regimental officers simply formed their troops as best they could and placed them where they could tackle the great columns looming out of the fog, hoping that the old, tried, formula of desperate courage and superior musketry would prevail against sheer numbers.

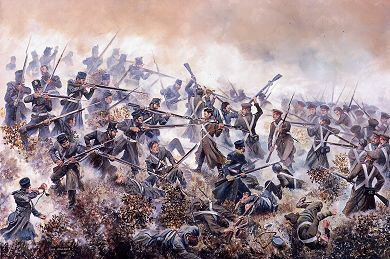

The 49th was split from the first. On the left Colonel Dalton led a wing forward, and although he was killed almost immediately, the four companies continued to fight desperately under the inspired command of Major Grant, who time and time again led successful bayonet attacks against the Russians. Further over to the right, the other wing under Lieutenant Bellairs was also heavily engaged throughout the battle, and played a leading role in the fight around the Sandbag Battery. Bellairs, who with his three companies of the 49th including Sergeant Walters, was on the top of Home Ridge. Here the Russians had pushed up the slope to within sixty or eighty yards of the three companies, and were first seen through the mist among the brushwood at that distance. Bellairs at once gave the order to fix bayonets and advance. The men did so without firing a shot till they were within forty yards of the head of the enemy's column, when with a cheer they charged. They were only about one hundred and eighty men, but the Russian column broke before their charge and fled, pursued by the fire of the 49th.

With the repulse of the Russian column near the Sandbag Battery by Brigadier-General Adams with the 41st, the first attack of twenty Russian battalions against the Home Ridge was beaten off. All this had occurred by 7.30 a.m.

General Pauloff brought up 10,000 Russian soldiers in the centre, and many more guns. Reinforcements were also coming up on the British side, but their numbers were very small compared with their assailants.

Brigadier-General Henry Adams was now near the Sandbag Battery with the 41st, which was joined by Bellairs' companies of the 49th. On Adams' left there was a gap between the 49th companies and the British at the head of the Quarry Ravine. To support Adams, there were two battalions of Guards on the heights in the rear but he had in front of him an enemy at least five times his strength and both his flanks were open and soon began to be turned. Here there continued a terrible fight in which the British defenders broken up into small groups. Slowly the gallant 700, whom Brigadier-General Adams commanded, were forced back on the heights to the rear.

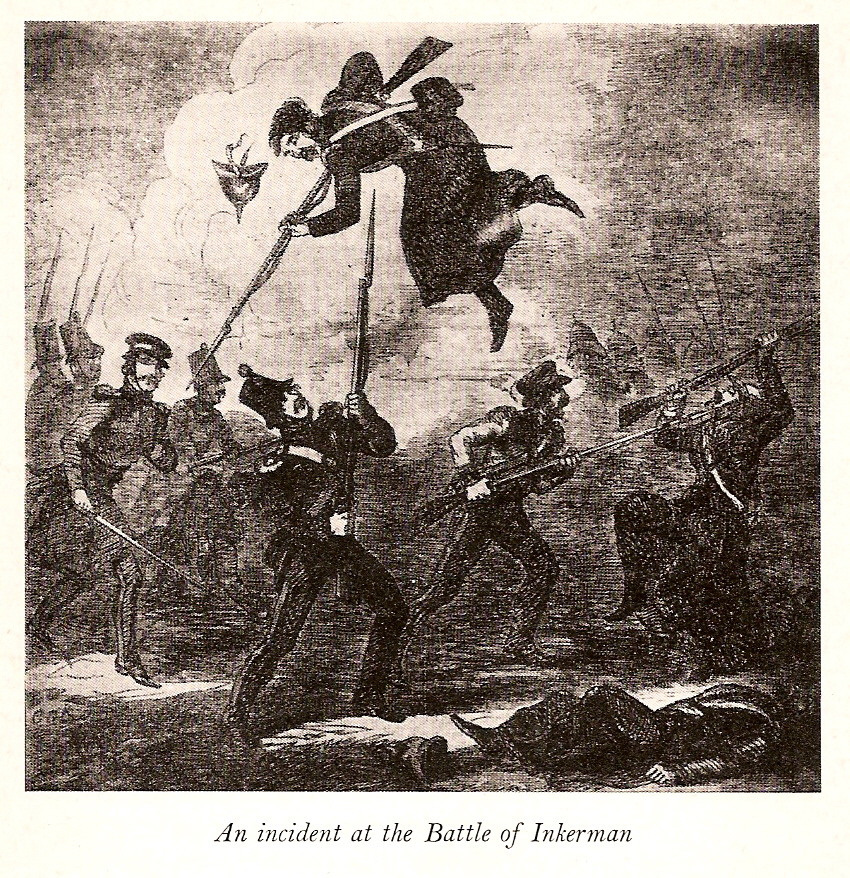

During the course of this fierce encounter Brigadier-General Adams had his horse killed under him, and as he was also wounded in the leg it seemed certain that he would be either captured or bayoneted by the Russians swarming around him. Sergeant George Walters of the 49th saw that his old commanding officer was in difficulties, and at once charged single-handed into the enemy surrounding the fallen general and drove them off with his bayonet. He then carried his officer back to comparative safety, and eventually he too received the Victoria Cross. Adams, wounded in the ankle, died a few days later at Scutari in the notorious Barrack Hospital.

The Grenadier Guards charged down on Sandbag Battery with the bayonet and drove out the Russians. In the fight that ensued here, the remains of Lieutenant Bellairs' companies seem to have been inextricably mixed up. The Sandbag Battery was eventually abandoned for the higher ground behind, but it was again retaken by the Grenadier Guards. After his fight on the spur, on which stood the Sandbag Battery, Lieutenant Bellairs, with the remnants of his three companies, found himself at the head of the Quarry Ravine. Including scattered groups from other battalions, there were about 150 men there. Somewhere about 9 a.m. they were preparing to resist the advance of a Russian column moving up the ravine against them when they received repeated orders, from an unidentified field officer, to retire and were compelled to do so, though Bellairs and other officers kept the retreat to a walk. Additions, as they retired, raised the 150 to 200 men. Presently, they found that they were retiring on the French 7th Leger, which was drawn up in good order. This battalion advanced at first, but never charged home and fell back again, the right of it in disorder.

Lieutenant Bellairs was now in rear of its left. The Russian advance here was broken, and the French line restored, by a charge of 30 men under Colonel Daubeny of the 55th directed on the right flank of the enemy column, the head of which was close under the final ascent to the Home Ridge. In repulsing this column, Bellairs appears to have taken his share with the 7th Leger in front. The time was about 9.15 a.m.

Beyond this point we find no further special mention of Lieutenant Bellairs' three companies, but it seems probable that they were again back at the 'Barrier' at the head of the Quarry Ravine, where they remained holding their own whilst the principal fight raged on their right.

It was between noon and 1 p.m., when the tide had turned and the Russians were on the point of retreating beaten, when an attempt was decided on to advance with the British left against the Russian batteries on Shell Hill. The attack on the west flank of the batteries was led by the 77th and the battery there was only saved by the guns being carried off in time. At this moment, Captain J. W. Armstrong of the 49th, then on the staff, galloped up and urged forward all the troops he could find to support the 17th. Amongst them was a complete company of the 49th, under Lieutenant Astley, and this joined in the advance against the battery and the pursuit. The Russians now retreated unpursued.

The losses of the 49th Regiment of Foot in the Battle of Inkermann were:- Killed: Major Dalton, Lieutenant and Adjutant A. S. Armstrong, 2 Sergeants, 1 Drummer, and 37 Rank and File. Wounded: Lieutenant Dewar (slightly), 9 Sergeants, 1 Drummer, 98 Rank and File.

In addition to these, it must be remembered the death of Brigadier-General Henry W. Adams, C.B. The whole battle was fought under such conditions that in seven hours fighting the 49th lost over 150 men, about a quarter of its effective strength.

After Inkermann, the 49th returned to the duties of the siege. The Digest of Service shows that in the Crimean War the 49th Regiment of Foot lost 191 officers and men by disease, besides 178 invalided.

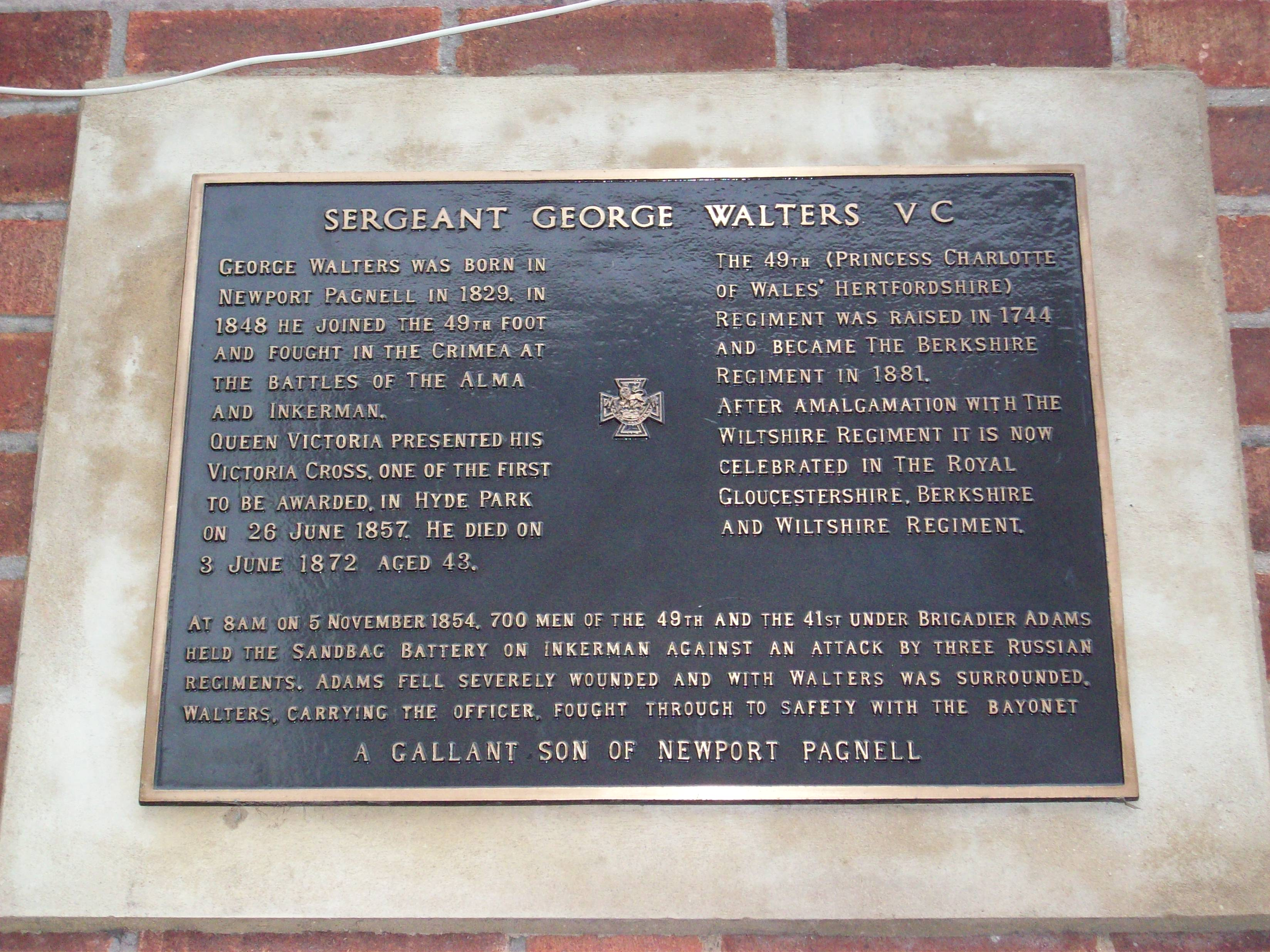
Commemorative Plaque

The 49th saw the Crimea War out to the end. It survived the first terrible winter on the plateau, not without heavy losses, and fought on in the trenches until eventually Sebastopol fell and the war ended. Even then it did not leave the theatre immediately, but spent a second winter there, although fortunately under conditions of luxury compared to those of the earlier one.

== Victoria Cross ==
A royal warrant issued on 29 January 1856 founded the Victoria Cross. It was more than a year after the royal warrant was signed that the first awards of the VC were published in the London Gazette on 24 February 1857. George Walter's deed was gazetted as follows:

Sergeant George Walters highly distinguished himself at the Battle of Inkermann, in having rescued Brigadier-General Adams, C.B., when surrounded by Russians, one of whom he bayoneted

The 26 June 1857 was chosen by Queen Victoria as a suitable day to bestow the new award on the recipients, when a grand parade was laid on in Hyde Park that she 'herself' attended on horseback. An extract in Queen Victoria’s Day Diary is as follows:

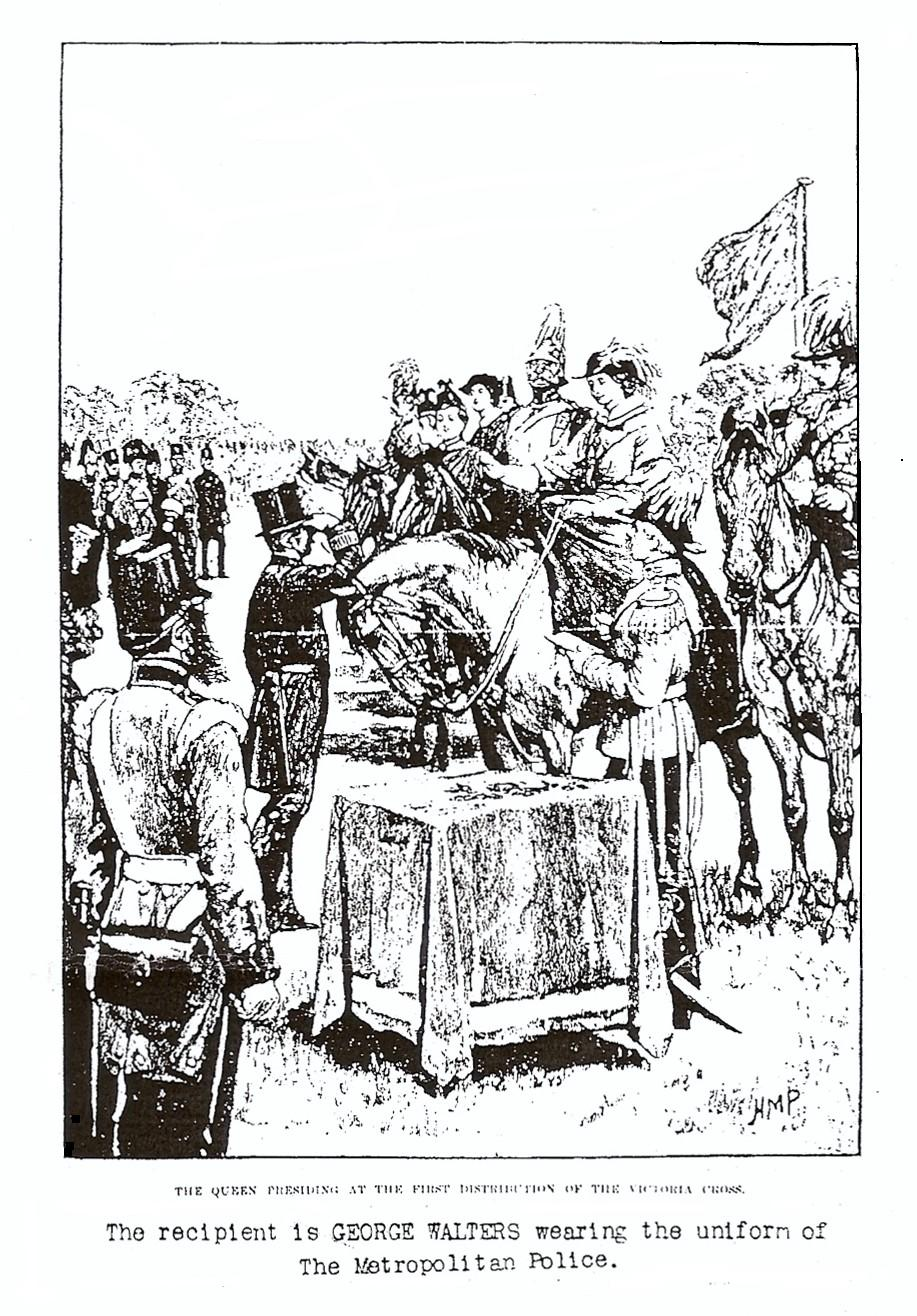
Queen Victoria awarding George Walters the VC

"After riding down the Line the ceremony of giving medals, began. There were 47 in number, with blue ribbons for the Navy, & red, for the Army. I remained on horseback, fastening the medals, or crosses, on recipient [sic]. Some were in plain clothes, - one a Gate Keeper & one a Policeman*...

The Policeman was of course George Walters and George was the 51st person to receive the Victoria Cross. A total of 12 Victoria Cross medals were awarded to those who fought in the Battle of Inkermann.

The Times, on the following day published the following article in which is mentioned:

"A few minutes before 10 o'clock the officers and men who were to receive the "high honour" of the Victoria Cross marched in single file across the park to the Queen's position. Their appearance created a deep sensation, and well it might, for upon a more distinguished band of soldiers the public have never yet gazed. One was a policeman, and wore his plain uniform as a constable of the R Division, No 444. This was George Walters, late Sergeant of the 49th Regiment who highly distinguished himself at lnkermann in rescuing General Adams when surrounded by Russians. Surely for such a man a better post may be found than that of a constable at 18s a week....."

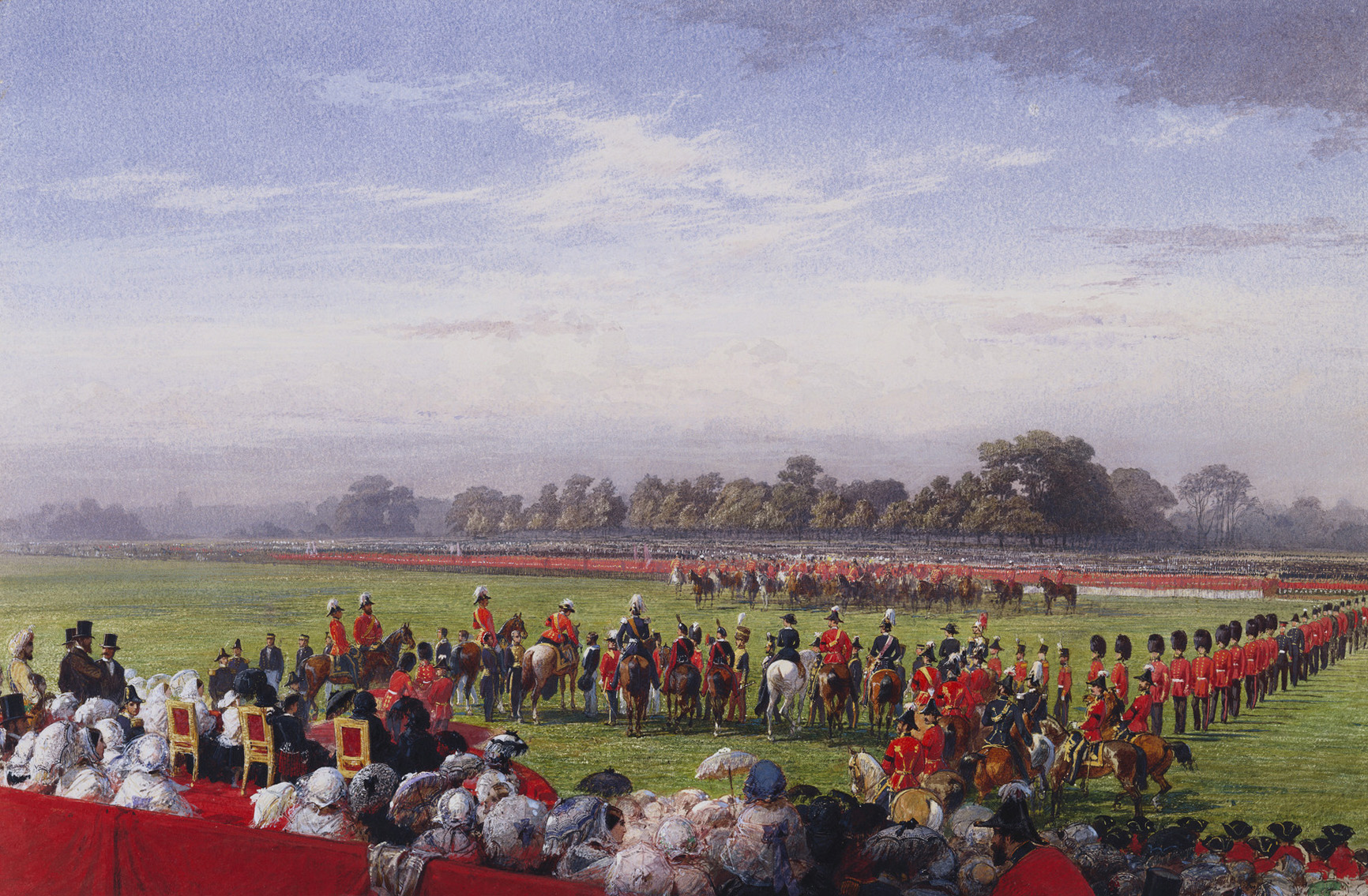
Queen Victoria presenting VC in Hyde Park on 26 June 1857

== Personal life ==
On 8 September 1856 George married Mary Ann Norman at the Newport Pagnell Parish Church. He was still a Sergeant in the 49th and gave his address as Newport Pagnell. His father James, the Innkeeper, was in attendance.

Shortly after the wedding, on 5 January 1857 George left the Army and joined the Metropolitan Police as Constable 444 of R Division.

On 21 June 1857, Mary Ann Walters gave birth to a son named James Isaac Walters. The Birth Certificate states that George Walters was now a Police Constable and they lived at 10 Lucas Street in Deptford, Kent.

George resigned from the Metropolitan Police on 26 October 1857 under Certificate No. 4 (1 = Excellent, 2 = Very Good. 3 = Good, and 4 = Open, i.e. no comment). Maybe he left the Mets after such a short period in order to join the Regent's Park Police and hence the fairly innocuous reference. No further record exists of George Walters until the 1871 English census. On 2 April 1871, George is shown as a visitor at North End, Newport Pagnell of the Maply family and his occupation is given as Park Keeper. Conversely, Mary Ann Walters is shown living at Lodge House, Park Crescent, Marylebone (the gatehouse to Regent's Park) with sons James Isaac, aged 13, George, aged 12, and Ephraim Robert, aged 2. Mary gave her occupation as Park Constable’s wife. They are the only census records that record George Walters.

== Death ==
On 3 June 1872, George died at West Lodge, Park Crescent, Marylebone. In attendance was Dr. William Marsh of Harley Street Lodge. George had been suffering with Phthisis for three years, which literally means a wasting disease but almost invariably will mean pulmonary tuberculosis or any debilitating lung or throat affections, a severe cough, asthma.

== Burial ==
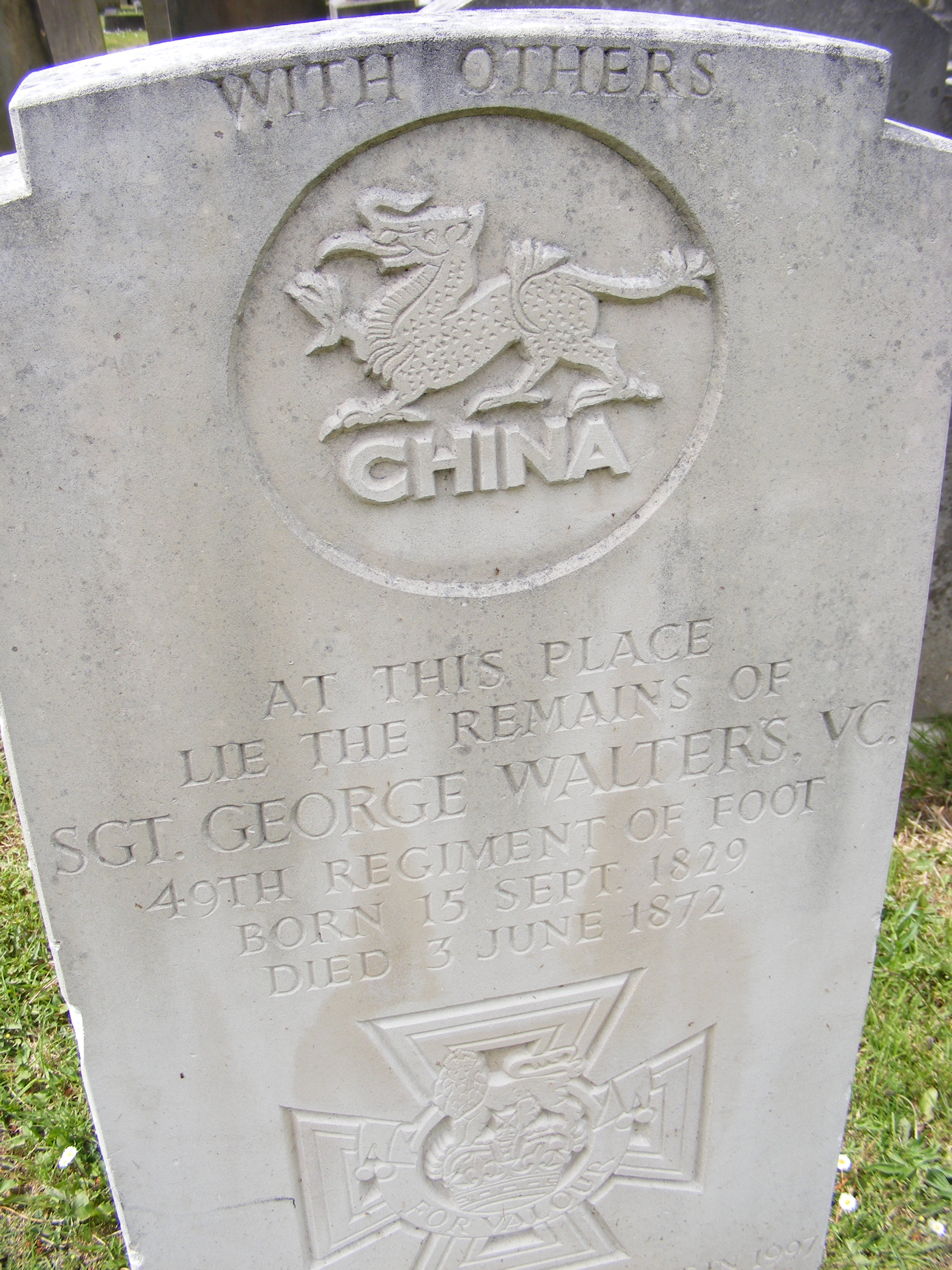
George Walter's gravestone erected by the Royal Berkshire Regiment in 1997

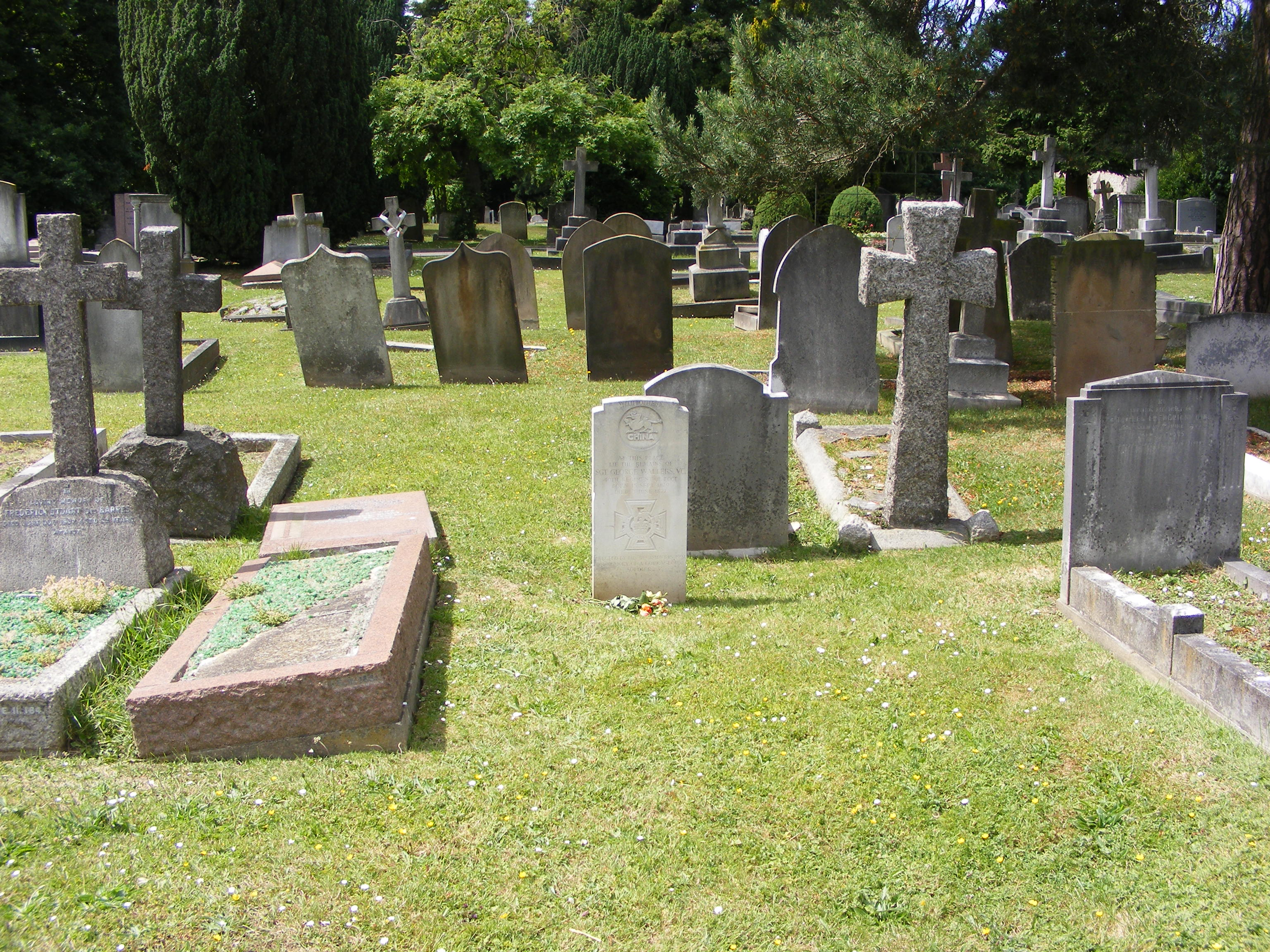
George Walters grave (centre)

He was buried on 9 June 1872 in the City of Westminster Cemetery, Finchley.

Research was carried out in 1997 to track down the unidentified graves of VC winners. It seems that George Walters died in poverty and was buried in an unmarked pauper’s grave. His grave was found using cemetery records. In January 1998 a new gravestone was dedicated at a short but moving graveside ceremony, which was attended by members of the Royal Gloucestershire, Berkshire and Wiltshire Regiment and Regimental Association including two pensioners from the Royal Hospital Chelsea. Inspector Paul Rason, Chairman of the Metropolitan Police Museum, was also present to pay tribute to one of his own.

The new gravestone is engraved with the China Dragon of the Royal Berkshire Regiment and the Victoria Cross, and has the inscription 'WITH OTHERS AT THIS PLACE LIE THE REMAINS OF SGT GEORGE WALTERS VC. 49TH REGIMENT OF FOOT. BORN 15 SEPT 1829. DIED 3 JUNE 1872. ERECTED BY HIS REGIMENT IN 1997 IN MEMORY OF A COURAGEOUS SOLDIER'

He lies in Plot 55 of Zone E10 at the renamed East Finchley Cemetery.

Later a Commemorative Plaque was unveiled and a Memorial Panel displayed at the British Legion Newport Pagnell for 'A GALLANT SON OF NEWPORT PAGNELL'.

== The medal ==
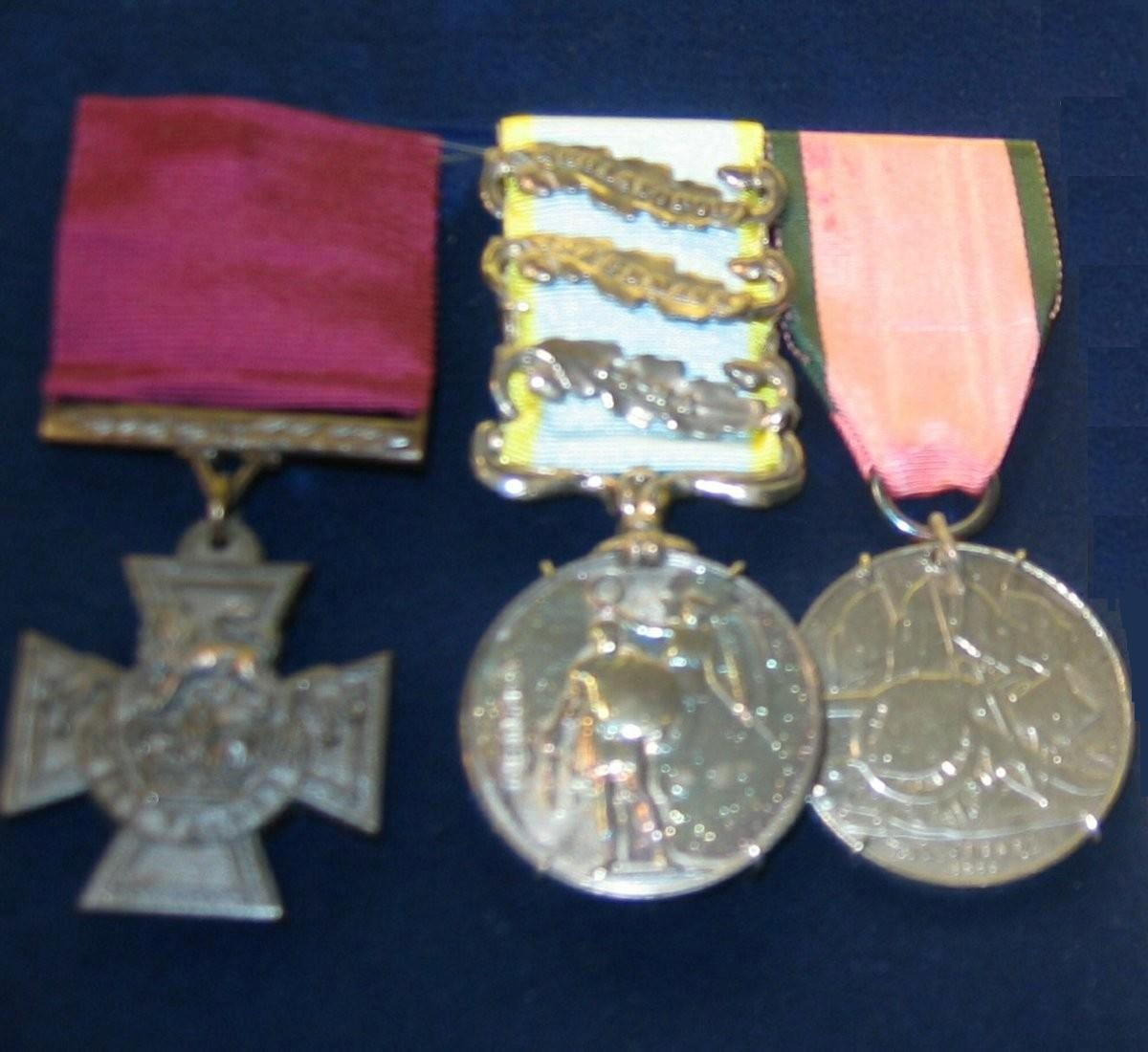

George Walters' Victoria Cross is displayed at The Rifles (Berkshire and Wiltshire) Museum (Salisbury, Wiltshire, England) together with his Crimea Medal with three Clasps (Alma, Inkermann & Sebestopol) and the Turkish Crimea Medal. They are not always on public display.
