= William Bull (minister) =

William Bull (1738–1814) was an English independent minister.

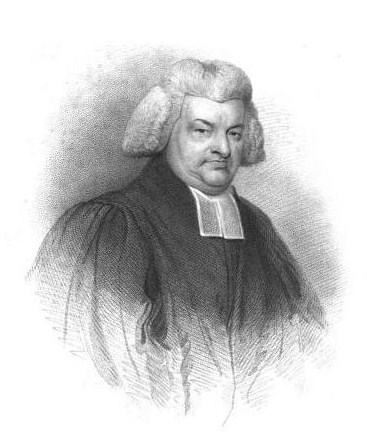
William Bull

== Life ==
Bull was born at Irthlingborough, near Wellingborough, Northamptonshire, the third son of John Bull. The children were brought up by their grandfather Francis Bull.

Bull learned to read the Hebrew alphabet, studied in William Whiston's Mathematics, and a contributed to Martin's Mathematical Magazine. He left his job, and went to live with his elder brother John, in Bedford. He worked on Latin under the Rev. Samuel Saunderson, and learned Greek with the Rev. James Belsham, pastor of the independent church at Newport Pagnell, who lived in Bedford. In 1759 he was admitted a student of Daventry Academy. He remained a Calvinist, in a less orthodox milieu.

In 1764 Bull succeeded Belsham as pastor of the church at Newport Pagnell, and to increase his income took pupils. Among his scholars was Sir John Leach, master of the rolls.

Bull formed an acquaintance with the Rev. John Newton of Olney, resulting in a lifelong relationship and frequent correspondence. Bull occasionally preached at the great house at Olney, where Newton conducted his prayer meetings with the assistance of William Cowper. Later Bull knew Cowper better, and preserved several of Cowper's poems. He also induced Cowper to translate into English verse some of the poems of Madame Guyon, printed at Newport Pagnell, with a preface by Bull.

At Olney vicarage Bull met Mrs. Wilberforce, aunt of William Wilberforce, and sister to John Thornton. She invited Bull to visit her in London, and there she introduced him to Thornton. About this time the evangelicals projected a new academy as preparation for the ministry. Newton drew up a plan, and a proposal was made for Bull to superintend the arrangements, and thus turn Bull's school into an academy. In 1782 he founded the Newport Pagnell Theological College, also known as the Academy. In 1783 the academy started with two students; it increased its numbers, and continued for many years. Supported mainly by Thornton, it trained about 100 ministers.

His acquaintance with Mrs. Wilberforce and the Thorntons also brought Bull into the company of Zachary Macaulay, Mr. Thomas Babington, and their friends Colonel Makelcan and Major Handfield. These were prominent figures in the Clapham Sect. Besides teaching, Bull frequently preached in London; and Lady Huntingdon's chapels often invited him.

Although he lived a long and busy life, Bull's health was never robust. In the opening of the year 1814 he became weaker, and died on 23 July in the seventy-seventh year of his age.

Together with his son Thomas Palmer Bull and his grandson Josiah Bull, the Bull family's ministry to the town spanned 105 years.

== Works ==
Bull was occupied three or four years in writing an Exposition of the Book of Psalms. A tract, Seasonable Hints, was written while on a trip to Ireland, printed at Dublin, and distributed during the journey. Bull contributed to Thornton's edition of Karl Heinrich von Bogatzky's Golden Treasury, published in 1775. A Brief Narrative of the Rise and Progress of the Independent Church of Newport (1811) was a joint work of Bull and his son Thomas.

== Family ==
In 1768 Bull married a daughter of Thomas Palmer of Bedford.
