= Henry Bull (cricketer) =

English cricketer

Personal information
- Full name: Henry Edward Bull
- Born: 8 March 1843; Newport Pagnell, Buckinghamshire, England
- Died: 31 May 1905 (aged 62); Maids Moreton, Buckinghamshire, England
- Height: 6 ft 0 in (1.83 m)
- Batting: Right-handed
- Bowling: Unknown

Domestic team information
- Years: Team
- 1863: Oxford University
- 1864–1876: Marylebone Cricket Club

Career statistics
| Competition | First-class |
|---|---|
| Matches | 21 |
| Runs scored | 494 |
| Batting average | 14.11 |
| 100s/50s | –/– |
| Top score | 46 |
| Balls bowled | 20 |
| Wickets | 0 |
| Bowling average | – |
| 5 wickets in innings | – |
| 10 wickets in match | – |
| Best bowling | – |
| Catches/stumpings | 9/– |
- Source: Cricinfo, 6 August 2019

Henry Edward Bull (8 March 1843 – 31 May 1905) was an English first-class cricketer.

The son of the Reverend Henry Bull, he was born in the rectory at Newport Pagnell in March 1843. Bull was educated at Westminster School, before going up to Christ Church, Oxford. Described by Frederick Lillywhite as a "brilliant bat, forward in style, combining splendid hitting, with careful defence", Bull made his debut in first-class cricket for Oxford University against Southgate at Oxford in 1863. He made two further first-class appearances for Oxford in 1863. The following year he played eight first-class matches for several teams, playing four times for the Marylebone Cricket Club (MCC), twice for the Gentlemen in the Gentlemen v Players fixture and once each for an England XI and the Gentlemen of the South, following this up with five further matches for the MCC in 1865. The following season he made four first-class appearances, playing one match each for the MCC, the Gentlemen of England, R. D. Walker's XI and Southgate. His final appearance in first-class cricket came ten years later in 1876, for the MCC against Oxford University. Across 21 first-class matches, Bull scored a total of 494 runs at an average of 14.11, with a high score of 46. When a county forerunner to Buckinghamshire County Cricket Club was founded in 1863–64, Bull served as its first honorary secretary, and was elected as its treasurer in 1865. Bull lived the majority of his life at Newport Pagnell, dying nearby at Maids Moreton in May 1905.
