= Old Town Hall Chambers =

Municipal building in Newport Pagnell, Buckinghamshire, Cornwall, England

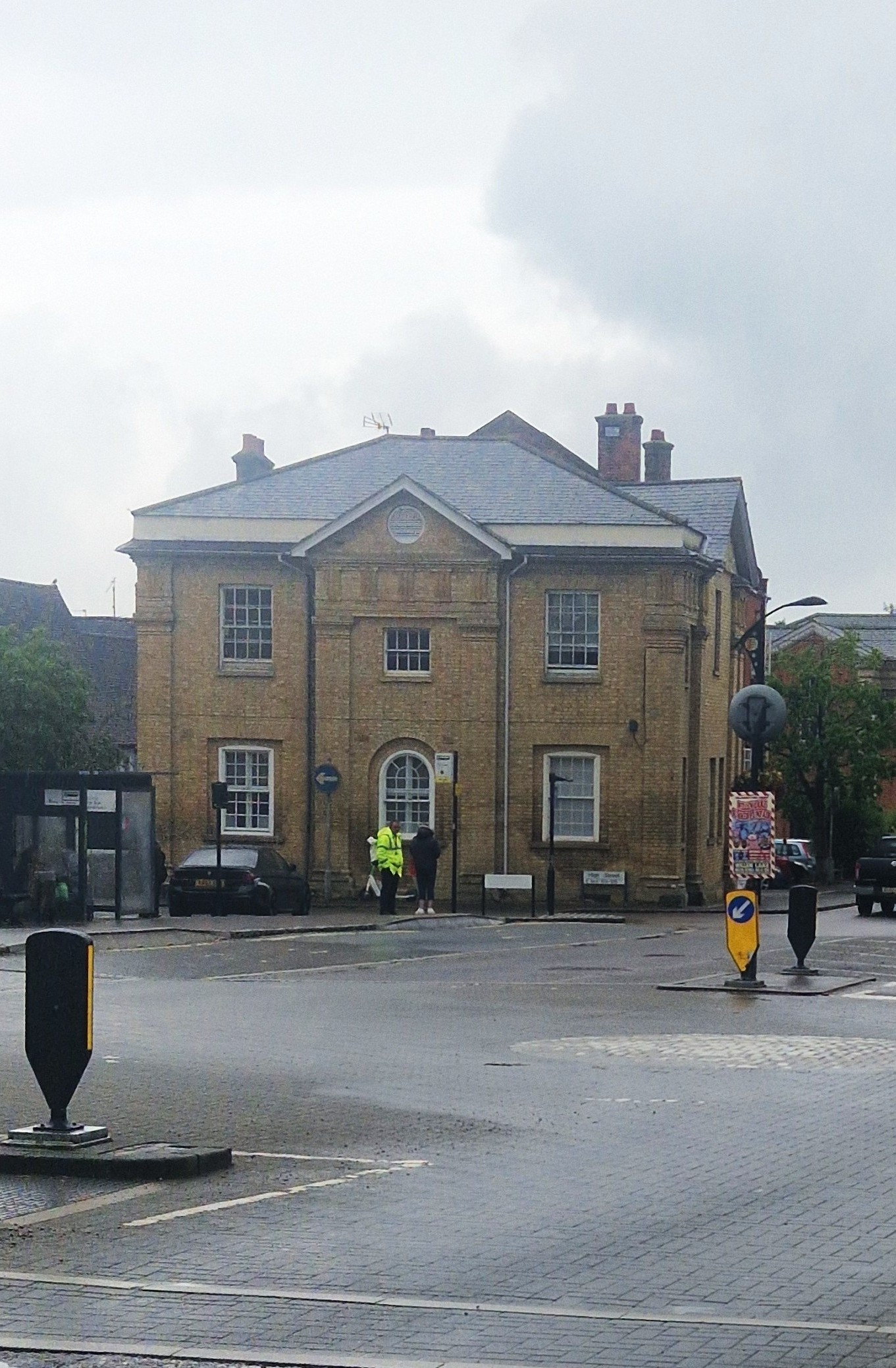
- The building in July 2025

- Shown in Buckinghamshire
- 52.0857°N 0.7260°W
- Location: High Street in Newport Pagnell

History
- Built: 1845

Site notes
- Architect: Richard Sheppard
- Architectural style: Neoclassical style

Listed Building – Grade II
- Official name: Old Town Hall Chambers
- Designated: 7 July 1972
- Reference no.: 1309947

The Old Town Hall Chambers is a historic building in the High Street in Newport Pagnell, a town in Buckinghamshire, in England. The building, which served as a public events venue, is a grade II listed building.

== History ==
The building was commissioned by the British and Foreign School Society as a British School. The site they selected, on the southeast side of the High Street, was made available by the lord of the manor, Charles Marius Hardy, under a conveyance dated 11 October 1810. Hardy had only just become lord of the manor earlier that year. The new school was completed in 1811.

A new facade, designed by Richard Sheppard in the neoclassical style, was built in yellow brick and completed in 1845. It accommodated the county court in a room on the first floor. After a new school in Bury Street was completed in 1896, the building became vacant and, in 1899, it was leased to the Newport Pagnell Town Hall Company, for 99 years, at a rent of £10 a year, for use as an events venue. Around this time, a new wing was added, in the Art Nouveau style, containing a stage and offices. In 1937, the building was acquired by the Church of England which renamed it Church House, although it continued in use as the town's main meeting place, hosting concerts, theatrical performances and dances. The building was not used for municipal purposes: at that time the offices of the local urban district council were at No. 60 High Street.

By the early 1980s, the parish church council was in urgent need of funds for repairs to the Church of St Peter and St Paul and decided to sell Church House. It sold the building to the Baptist church and the first Baptist prayer meeting there took place in July 1983. However, the Baptist church were in need of larger premises and relocated to the Lovat Hall in spring 1997. In 1998, the building was acquired by a developer and converted into apartments.

== Architecture ==
The two-storey neoclassical building is constructed of yellow brick, and has a slate roof. The design involves a symmetrical main frontage of three bays facing northeast along the High Street. The central bay is fenestrated by a recessed round headed window on the ground floor and by a small square window on the first floor flanked by giant Doric order pilasters on pedestals, supporting an entablature with triglyphs. The central bay is surmounted by a pediment, with a louvred oculus in the tympanum. The outer bays are fenestrated by segmental headed sash windows on the ground floor and by square headed sash windows on the first floor and there are additional giant Doric order pilasters at the corners.

The Art Nouveau wing is to the southwest, and is built of red brick with stone dressings. The design involves a symmetrical main frontage of three bays facing southwest along the High Street. The central bay features a round headed doorway with long voussoirs which is flanked by brackets supporting a canopy. The canopy is surmounted by a row of seven segmental headed window openings. Above that there is a pebble-dashed panel and then another row of seven segmental headed window openings, all surmounted by pediment with an oculus in the tympanum. The central bay is flanked by triangular full-height pilasters. The building was grade II listed in 1972.
