= Tickford Bridge =

Bridge in Newport Pagnell, Buckinghamshire, England

Coordinates: 52.0858°N 0.7200°W

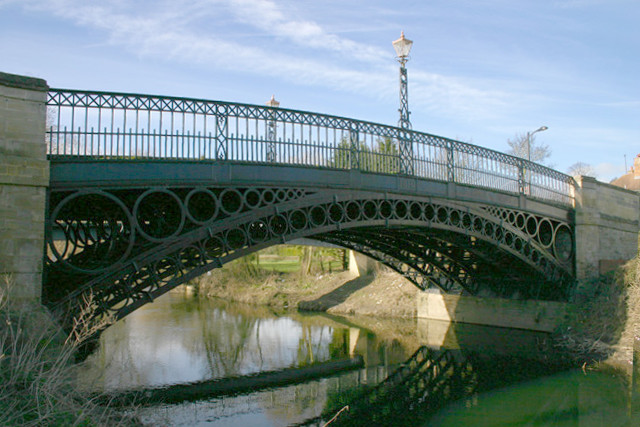
Tickford Bridge

Tickford Bridge, over the River Ouzel (or Lovat) in Newport Pagnell, Buckinghamshire, England, was built in 1810. It is one of the last (21 still remaining) cast iron bridges in Britain that still carry modern road traffic, and is the oldest bridge in the City of Milton Keynes. There is a plaque near the footbridge at the side that gives details of its history and construction. A large set of sluice gates, used to control downstream flooding of the River Great Ouse, is located near the bridge.

Tickford Bridge is Grade I listed by Historic England.

== See also ==
- The Iron Bridge
