= Tickford Priory =

Priory then country house in Newport Pagnell

Coordinates: 52.0866°N 0.7150°W

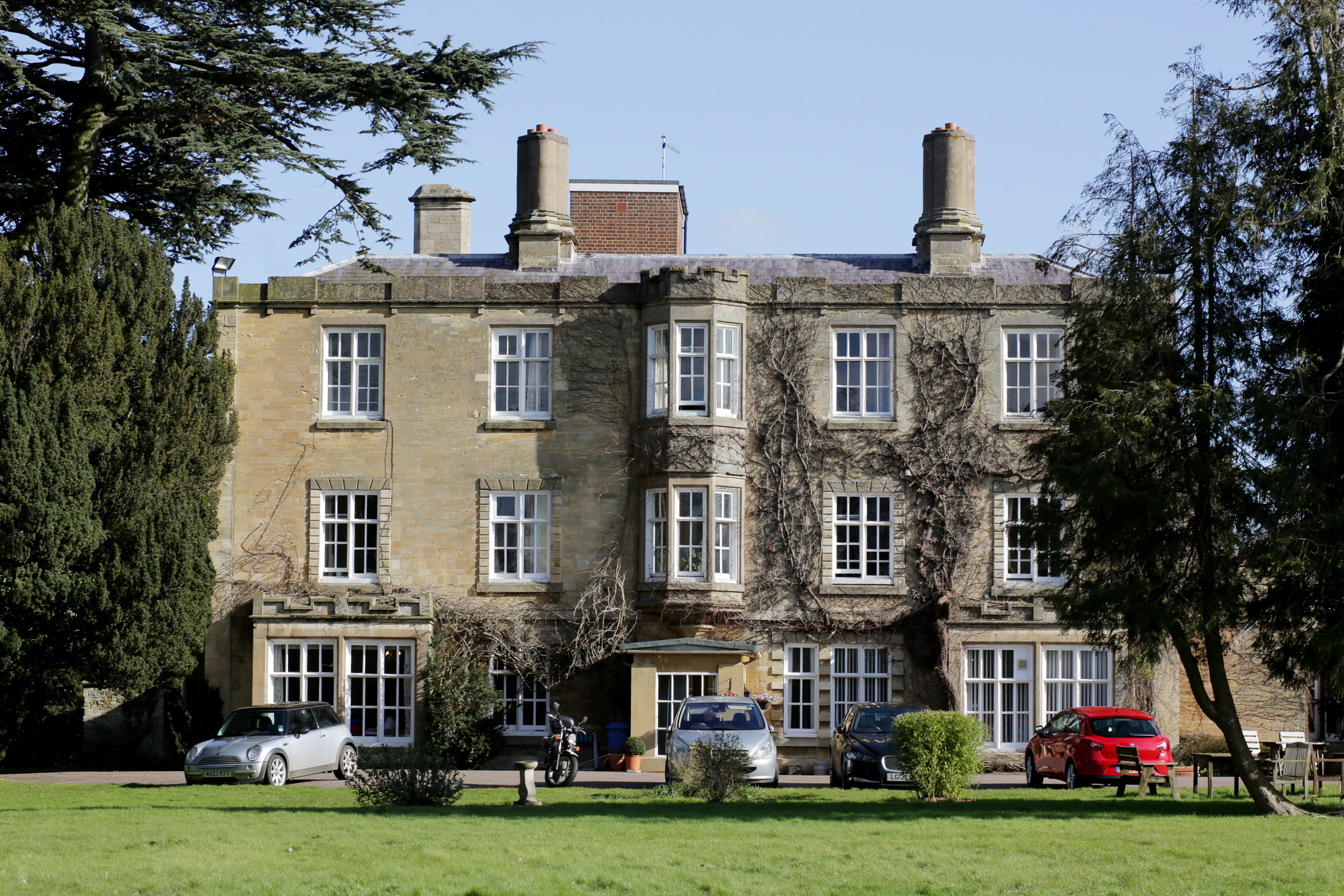
Tickford Abbey

Tickford Priory was a medieval monastic house in Newport Pagnell in Buckinghamshire, England.

Tickford Priory was established in 1140 by Fulconius Paganel, the lord of the Manor of Newport Pagnell. The priory was a cell of the Cluniac Order, headquartered at Marmoutier Abbey in Tours, France. As most of the monks originated from France, it was considered an alien monastery. As such, its income was seized in the wars between England and France when Edward III and Richard II reigned.

The monastery enjoyed freedom from tolls at the local market and derived much income from its lands. However, the rules were not followed properly, and the monks rebelled against the bishop of Lincoln and the vicar of Newport in the 13th and 14th century. When the priory was dissolved by Henry VIII in 1525, both abbey and land was given to Cardinal Wolsey who annexed "the superfluous house of Tickford". The "Issues of the House" were assessed at £57 11s 4d, the bells and lead at £33 6s 8d and the moveable goods at £5 4s 0d. In 1530 the land was repossessed and subsequently given to Christ Church, Oxford but, again, reverted to the Crown.

By the early 18th century, some former Tickford Priory buildings were still standing, but they were in poor condition. The current building on the site was built in the 18th century. However, much of the fabric of this building is believed to have come from the Tickford Priory.

Between 1278 and 1290, several monks were imprisoned and excommunicated for their bad behaviour and excesses; the last prior was Thomas Brooke. In 1311 a fire destroyed all the charters recording grants of land and privileges to the monks and a new charter was obtained from the Crown listing all their holdings.

In 1621, King James I sold the abbey to his physician, Dr Henry Atkins. The current Georgian mansion was built by the Hooton family on the site of a medieval priory. By the early 18th century, some former Tickford Priory buildings were still standing, but they were in poor condition. Around 1767, Thomas Hooton built the house that stands today. Much of the fabric of this building is believed to have come from the Tickford Priory. There is a family vault to rear of the premises in the grounds of the Priory Burial Ground also a tall Obelisk which was erected by Thomas Hooton in memory of his wife Sarah. Another feature of the Abbey is the Gazebo, restored and modernized in 1987 under initiative of the Buckinghamshire Historic Buildings Trust, which stands by the River Ouse in the extensive grounds of the house. The Obelisk and Gazebo are both listed ancient monuments.

In 1846, George Lucas sold the Abbey to William Powell. It was William Powell who created the magnificent Tickford Park and built the two lodges at the end of the drive. Over the next century, the abbey had a number of owners: Richard Mansel Oliver Massey (1869), Evan Williams (1881), Phillip Butler (1883), William Wates (1891), Phillip E Butler, son of previous owner (1901), Major William John Chesshyre Butler (1903). It is assumed that the Butler family let Abbey in the following few years, hence the reason for the number of occupiers in such a short time: Colonel William Henry Allison (1907), Michael John Godby (1911) and Colonel Butler (1915).

In March 1930, Douglas Ernest Mannering Douglas-Morris was running a private hospital at the Abbey. He changed the name to Tykeford Abbey Nursing Home.

The Grade II listed building, built on the site of Tickford Priory, is now a residential and dementia care home called Tickford Abbey, owned and managed by care charity Greensleeves Care.

== Literature ==
- W. F. Bull (1900). A History of Newport Pagnell. W. E. & J. Goss.
- J. Staines (1842). History of Newport Pagnell.
- O. Ratcliff (1901). History and Antiquities of the Newport Pagnell Hundreds. Olney.
- William Page, ed. (1905). "House of Cluniac monks: The priory of Tickford or Newport Pagnel". A History of the County of Buckingham. Vol. 1. London: Victoria County History. pp. 360–365.

== See also ==
- Church of St Peter and St Paul, Newport Pagnell, which Paynel gave to the monastery, together with its associated land and tithes.
