= Church of St Peter and St Paul, Newport Pagnell =

C of E parish church

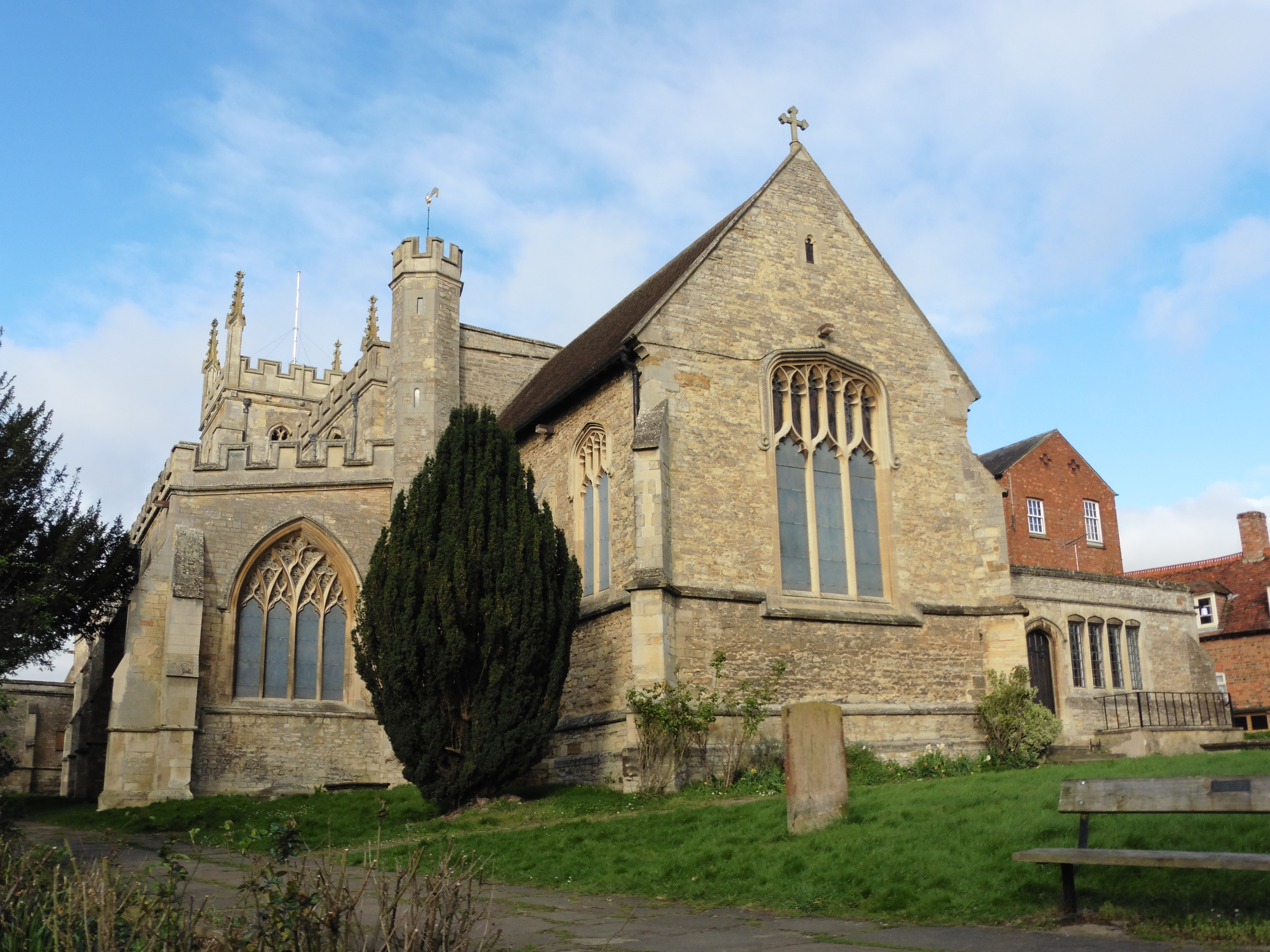
- St Peter and St Paul, Newport Pagnell
- Church of St Peter and St Paul, Newport Pagnell
- 52°05′13″N 0°43′13″W
- Location: Newport Pagnell, Buckinghamshire
- Country: England
- Denomination: Church of England

Architecture
- Style: Norman, English Gothic
- Years built: 1355 (south doorway), restored 1827.

Administration
- Diocese: Diocese of Oxford
- Parish: Newport Pagnell

Clergy
- Rector: Revd. Nick Evans

The St Peter and St Paul is a Grade I listed parish church in Newport Pagnell, Buckinghamshire, England. The building is mainly medieval with many subsequent changes. The church was Grade I listed on 24 October 1950.

== History ==
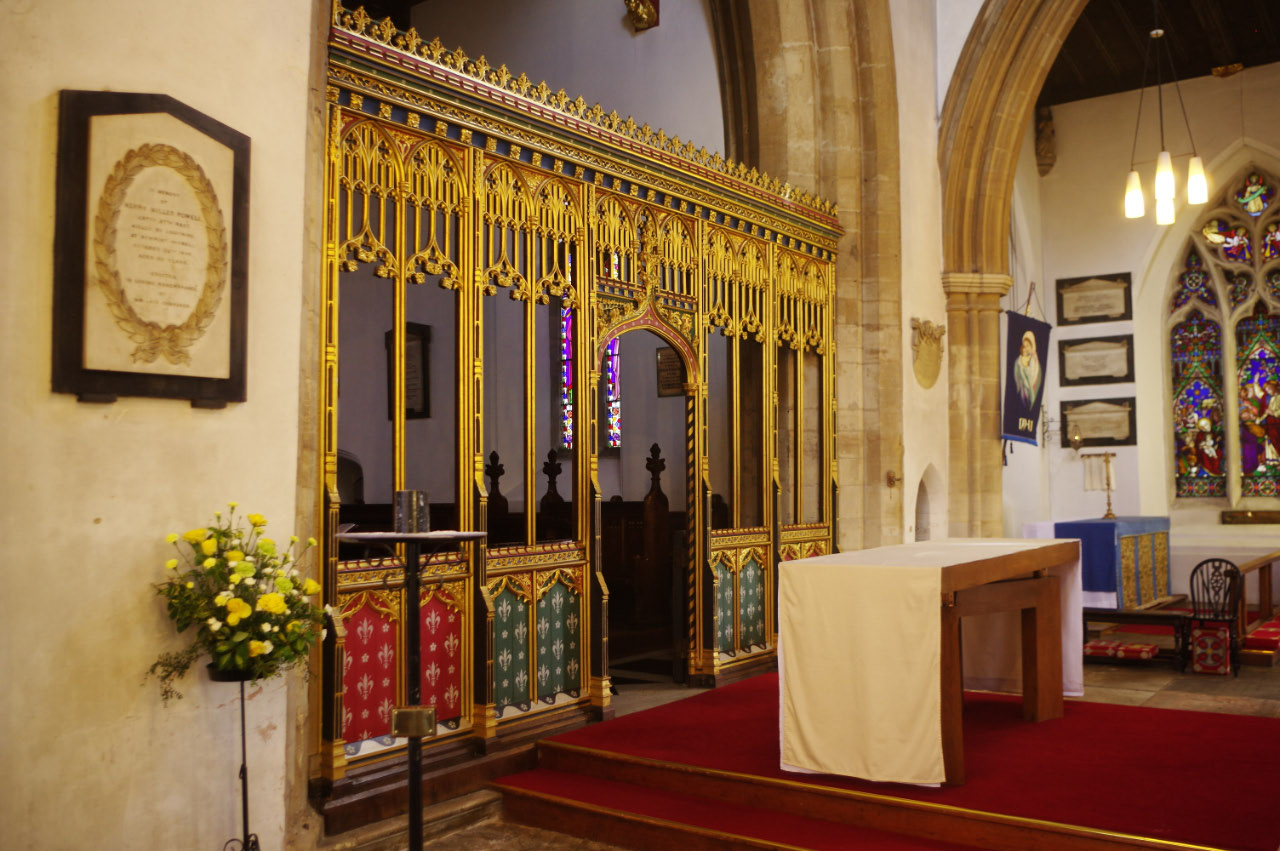
The church interior, showing the Victorian rood screen enclosing the chancel.

Sometime in the mid-1100s, Fulk Paynel (the Norman lord of the town) granted the church (then called the Church of Saint Mary) to the priory of Tickford. "The prior undertook to provide a dwelling-house for the vicar and a deacon to assist him, besides maintaining him at the table of the priory, paying him a yearly stipend of 20 shillings and allowing him a certain proportion of the offerings of parishioners". (Note: Twenty shillings equals one pound. Indexed by RPI, its approximate value today is £2,000)

== Architecture ==
The church is mainly medieval (14th Century) with a mid 16th century ashlar faced west tower; it was restored in the early 19th century, when battlements and pinnacles were added to the tower. The south doorway and porch date from c. 1355.

The chancel measures internally 37 ft 0 in × 18 ft 6 in (11.28 m × 5.64 m) and the north vestries, organ chamber and nave is 94 ft × 25 ft (28.7 m × 7.6 m). "The east wall of the nave, which is 5 ft 4 in (1.63 m) thick, probably incorporates the remains of the central tower of an early cruciform church, but all other parts of the structure were entirely rebuilt in the middle of the 14th century".

The nave has a richly moulded low-pitched roof of the early 16th century, with foliated bosses at the intersections of the timbers. The wall-posts are connected to the beams by curved brackets and are supported by stone corbels carved as angels holding shields, while in front of each of the posts is a carved wood figure, two of the figures representing angels and the others saints, including the twelve apostles. There are also carved figures of angels at the centres of the tie-beams and at the feet of the intermediate rafters. The lean-to roofs of the aisles are of the same character and period, and have carved wooden figures at the lower corners. Tie-beams and wallplates of the Tudor period have also been re-used with the modern timbers of the chancel roof.

— Victoria History of the Counties of England: a history of the County of Buckingham (1927)

The rood screen (or chancel screen) dates from 1875.

== The church today ==
The Benefice of Newport Pagnell with Lathbury and Moulsoe is a group of four Church of England churches.
