= Newport Pagnell =

Town in Buckinghamshire, England

Coordinates: 52.087°N 0.722°W

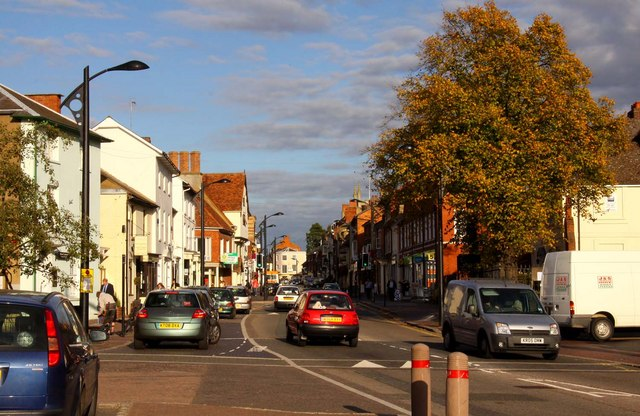
- High Street

- Location within Buckinghamshire
- Interactive map of Newport Pagnell
- Population: 15,594 (2021 census)
- OS grid reference: SP873437
- Civil parish: Newport Pagnell
- District: City of Milton Keynes
- Unitary authority: Milton Keynes City Council
- Ceremonial county: Buckinghamshire
- Region: South East
- Country: England
- Sovereign state: United Kingdom
- Post town: NEWPORT PAGNELL
- Postcode district: MK16
- Dialling code: 01908
- Police: Thames Valley
- Fire: Buckinghamshire
- Ambulance: South Central
- UK Parliament: Milton Keynes North

Newport Pagnell is a town and civil parish in the City of Milton Keynes, Buckinghamshire, England. The Office for National Statistics records it as being part of the Milton Keynes urban area. It is separated from the rest of the urban area by the M1 motorway.

The town is more widely known for Newport Pagnell services, the UK's second ever motorway service station. The town is also known for having the only remaining vellum manufacturer in the UK and for having been the original home of the exclusive sports car manufacturer, Aston Martin.

== History ==
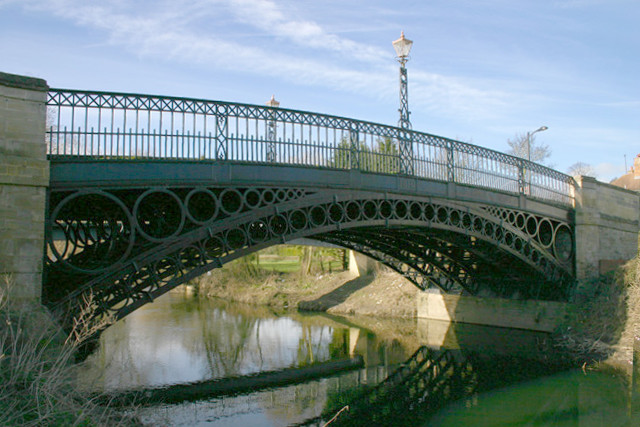
Tickford Bridge

The town was first mentioned in the Domesday Book of 1086 as Neuport, (Note: Old English for 'New Market Town') but, by that time, the old Anglo-Saxon town was dominated by the Norman invaders. The suffix 'Pagnell' came later when the manor passed into the hands of the Pagnell (Paynel) family. It was the principal town of the Three Hundreds of Newport, the north Buckinghamshire district that had almost the same boundary as the modern City of Milton Keynes unitary authority area. The parish church of St Peter and St Paul is first recorded in the mid-1100s.

The Grade I listed Tickford Bridge, over the river Ouzel (or Lovat), was built in 1810; it is one of just a few cast iron bridges in Britain that still carry modern road traffic. Near the footbridge at the side, there is a plaque placed by Newport Pagnell Historical Society that gives details of its history and construction. The Ouzel joins the Great Ouse nearby and a large set of sluice gates – used to mitigate downstream flooding – is located near the bridge.

Between 1817 and 1864, the town was linked to the Grand Junction Canal at Great Linford, via the Newport Pagnell Canal. In 1862, the canal owners sold the route to the London and North Western Railway.

Between 1867 and 1967, the town was served by Newport Pagnell railway station, the terminus on the Wolverton to Newport Pagnell branch line. The route is now a rail trail, part of the Milton Keynes redway system.

The population of Newport Pagnell and its hinterland at the 1801 Census was 17,576; by 1911, it had grown to 14,428. (Note: "Newport Pagnell PLU/RegD through time | Population Statistics | Males and Females". A Vision of Britain through Time. GB Historical GIS / University of Portsmouth. (PLU means Poor Law Union, RegD is Civil Registration District. The "hinterland" is large, almost coterminous with the modern City of Milton Keynes district.)) The population of Newport Pagnell Urban District alone is first recorded at the 1911 Census as 4,238, reaching 4,743 by 1961. At the 2021 census, the population of the civil parish had reached 15,594.

=== Listed buildings and structures ===
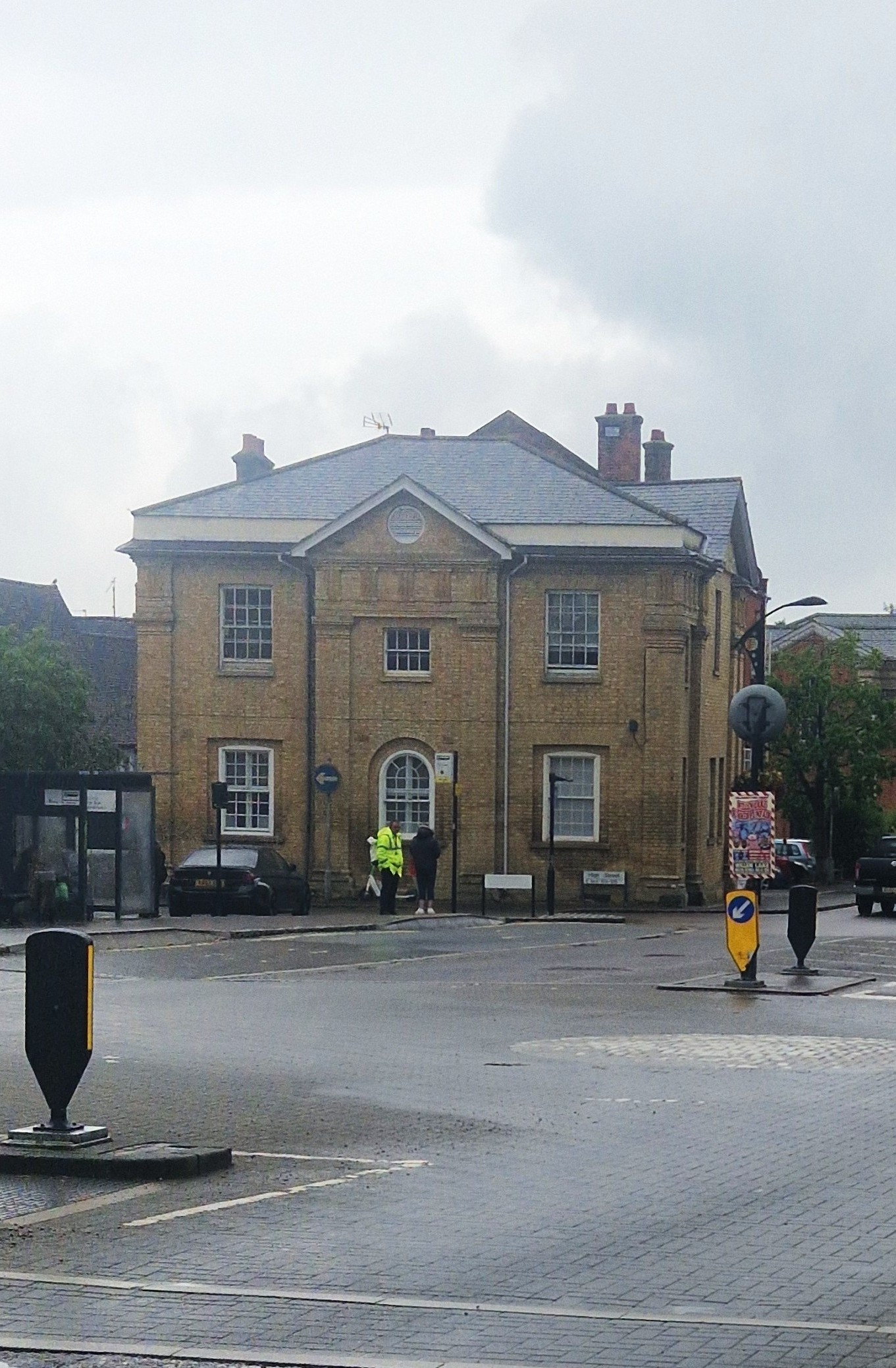
The Old Town Hall Chambers

The town has the following listed buildings and structures:

- One scheduled monument, the Civil War defences in Bury Field
- Two buildings or structures listed at Grade I: Tickford Bridge, and the Church of St Peter and St Paul
- One at Grade II*: 84 High St.
- A further 118 at Grade II.
- The Old Town Hall Chambers, now apartments, were built as a school in the early 19th century.

== Industry ==
From 1954 until 2007, the town was the home to the sports car manufacturer Aston Martin. The Newport Pagnell factory was considered outdated and a new production facility was built near Gaydon, in Warwickshire.

Notable industries in the town include the only remaining vellum manufacturer in the United Kingdom, William Cowley, located at Parchment Works, 97 Caldecote Street.

For many years, Newport Pagnell was also the home of Taylor's Mustard. The firm was formed in 1825, in premises next to the old Fire Station in the High Street by William Taylor.

Since the 1980s, Newport Pagnell has attracted an increasing amount of investment and of economic growth, due to its fortunes being intertwined with the growth of Milton Keynes. This has led to a number of new housing developments in the area.

== Governance ==
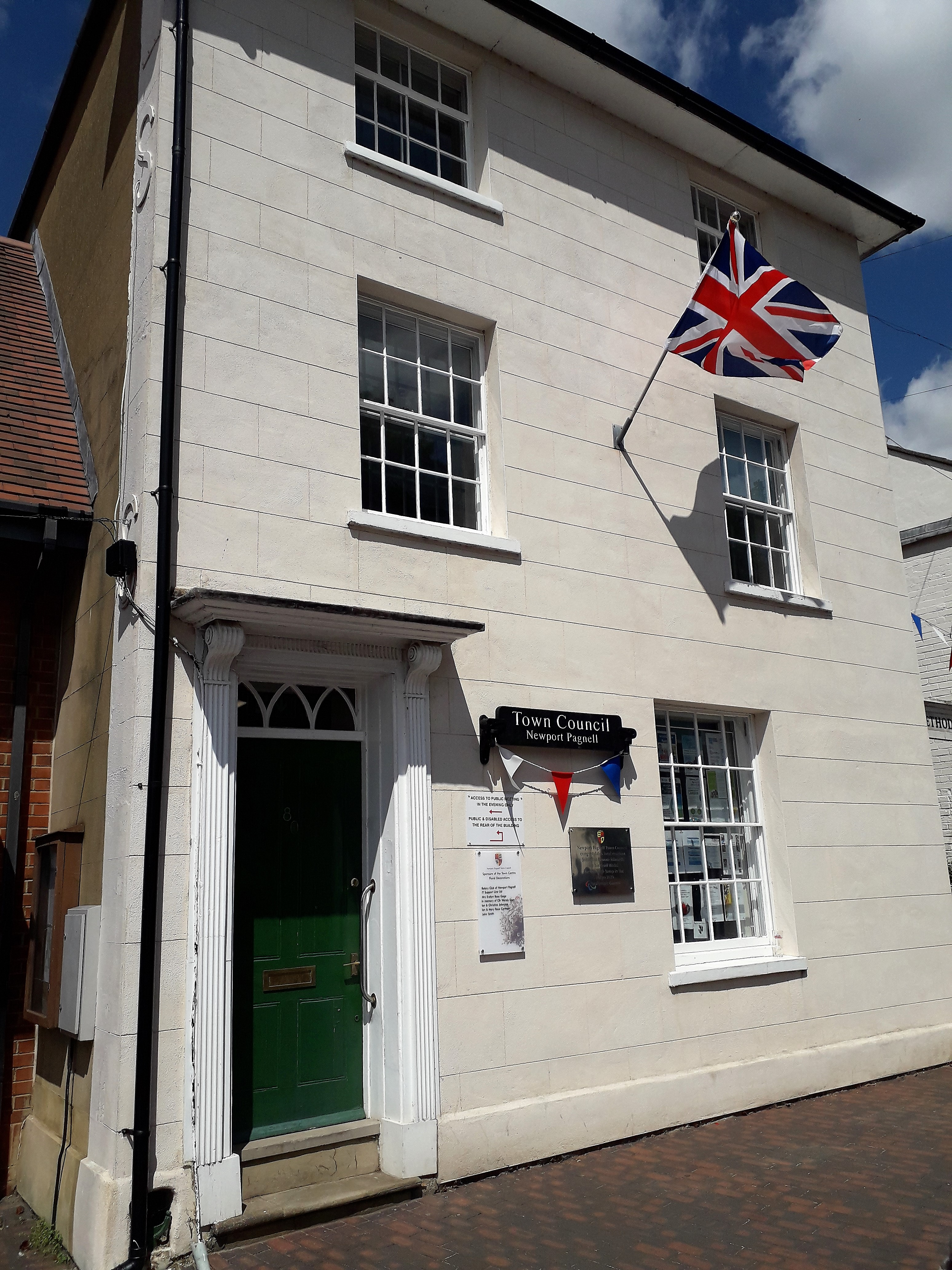
The Town Council offices at 80 High Street

There are two tiers of local government covering Newport Pagnell, at parish (town) and unitary authority level: Newport Pagnell Town Council and Milton Keynes City Council. The town council has its offices and meeting place at 80 High Street.

The town became the headquarters of Newport Pagnell Rural District under the Local Government Act 1894. In 1897, it became the sole civil parish within the newly created Newport Pagnell Urban District. Both the urban and rural district were abolished in 1974, merging with neighbouring districts to become the (then) Borough of Milton Keynes. The former urban district was an unparished area from 1974 to 1985, governed directly by Milton Keynes Borough Council. The civil parish of Newport Pagnell was re-established in 1985, with its council adopting the name Newport Pagnell Town Council.

== Demographics ==
Although Newport Pagnell was excluded from the 1967 designated area of Milton Keynes, its growth has been at a similar level to that of the constituent towns of the latter; the two now join at the M1 and there are no other practical distinctions between them. Since the 2001 census, the Office for National Statistics records Newport Pagnell as part of the Milton Keynes Urban Area.

== Location and growth ==
The town is located at the north-eastern corner of the Milton Keynes urban area.

It was proposed in January 2021 that, with the money that had been given to Milton Keynes City Council as part of the UK Government's Active Travel Fund, Tongwell Lane in Newport Pagnell would be converted into the Milton Keynes redway system, which would better link the town with the rest of the city. Since its completion in March 2021, the town has been served by three connections to the wider redway network of Milton Keynes, all heading westwards into Blakelands first: Tongwell Lane, Stanmore Gardens and the Wolverton-Newport Pagnell railway walk.

Newport Pagnell is identified by the city council, in local planning documents, as one of the three "key settlements" in the Milton Keynes UA outside of the 1967 designated area of the New Town, with the town's complementary Neighbourhood Plan, adopted in June 2021, allocating a total of 1,400 homes for the town between 2016 and 2031.

== Education ==
The town has four primary schools (Tickford Park, Cedars, Green Park and Portfields) and three pre-schools (River Meadows, Lovat Hall and Northern Pastures).

One of two campuses of Ousedale School, (Note: The other one being in nearby Olney.) is located here, which serves students from across the town and its surrounding villages; it is one of the best performing secondary schools in the city.

== Transport ==
=== Railway ===
Since the closure of the town's railway station, the closest are now at Wolverton (approximately 3.5 miles (5.6 km) away) for suburban services only; Milton Keynes Central (4 miles (6.4 km) away) provides suburban and inter-city services between London Euston, the West Midlands and the North West.

Both stations lie on the West Coast Main Line.

=== Buses ===
Bus routes in the town are:

- 2 to Central Milton Keynes and Granger Farm, operated by Arriva Beds and Bucks
- 21 between Central Milton Keynes, Olney and Lavendon, operated by Red Rose Travel
- C10 between Milton Keynes, Cranfield and Bedford, operated by Uno.

The city council also operates an on demand bus service known as "MK Connect", which serves the whole unitary authority area, including Newport Pagnell.

=== Roads ===
The town is served by the M1 motorway from junction 14 (2 miles (3.2 km) to the south) via the A509 which, along with the A422 and Wolverton Road, connects it with (the rest of) the Milton Keynes urban area.

To the east, the A422 and A509 multiplex northwards to form the Newport Pagnell Eastern Bypass, providing links to Bedford, Wellingborough and Kettering.

The historic Newport Pagnell-Northampton road (B526) runs through the centre of the town, linking rural villages to the north and provides a secondary route to Northampton.

== Churches ==
The parish church of St Peter and St Paul

The modern civil parish of Newport Pagnell stops at the M1, but the Church of England ecclesiastical parish extends to include Broughton and Caldecote. Much of the Grade I listed parish church of St Peter and St Paul dates from the 14th century.

== Sport and leisure ==
Newport Pagnell has a non-League football team Newport Pagnell Town F.C., nicknamed the Swans, which plays at The Pavilion, on Willen Road.

An ITF Taekwon-Do club, Kicks Academy, trains at Cedars primary school.

Lawn bowls has been played in Newport Pagnell for over 400 years, as maps of the town dating from the mid-17th century show a public house called "The Bowling Green". The Newport Pagnell Bowling Club was founded in 1905 and the club used the bowling green behind the George pub in Tickford Street (currently The Magic Wok). The game was developing locally due to the railways, with clubs at Wolverton existing already and Olney forming in 1906. After the Great War, the club purchased a plot of land known as "The Bully" and it remains at this site in Castle Meadow.

== Notable people ==
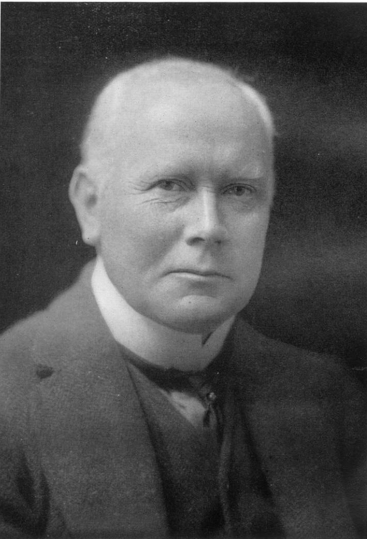
Charles Sanford Terry, 1913

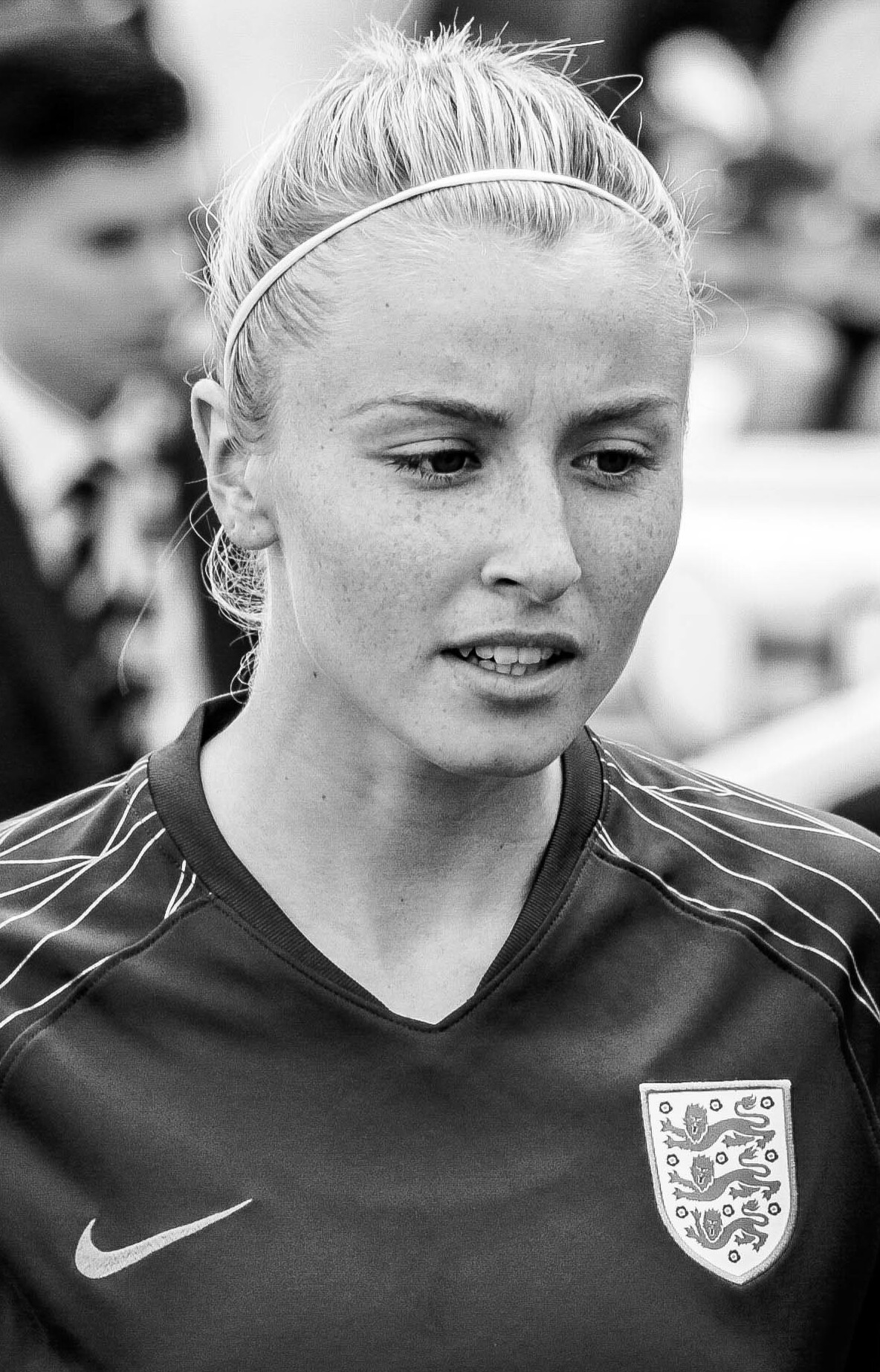
Leah Williamson, 2019

- Lawrence Humphrey (ca.1527–1590), English theologian, president of Magdalen College in Oxford, and Dean successively of Gloucester and Winchester cathedrals.
- Francis Annesley, 1st Viscount Valentia (ca.1585–1660), statesman and MP; lived in Newport Pagnell.
- Arthur Annesley, 1st Earl of Anglesey (1614–1686) royalist statesman, created Baron Annesley of Newport Pagnell in 1661.
- Lewis Atterbury (1656–1731), a churchman, a royal chaplain to two monarchs.
- William Bull (b. 1738 in Irthlingborough–1814), minister to the Independent Church, now United Reformed Church. He established the Newport Pagnell Academy in 1783 to train dissenting preachers.
- George Walters (1829–1872) won the Victoria Cross at the Battle of Inkermann in 1854.
- Frederick Woodward Branson (1851–1933), chemist, glassblower, instrument maker and X-ray pioneer.
- Charles Sanford Terry (1864–1936), historian, musicologist and authority on J.S. Bach
- Nigel Benson (born 1955) author, illustrator and fine artist specializing in oils and pastels
- Richard Hopkins (1964–2012), TV producer of Big Brother and Strictly Come Dancing
- Letitia Dean (born 1967), actress; went to Cedars School in the town.
- Richard Meredith (born ca.1970), writer of adventure travel novels, lives in Newport Pagnell.
- Kelly George (born 1970), actor; star of BBC children's television series Grange Hill, lived and educated in the town.
- Gordon Moakes (born 1976), bassist of Indie band Bloc Party, educated in Newport Pagnell.
- Tom Austin (born 2000), stage name Niko B, YouTuber and rapper, lives in Newport Pagnell.

=== Sport ===
- Henry Bull (1843–1905), first-class cricketer, played 21 games.
- David Oldfield (born 1968) footballer with 678 club caps, lived in Newport Pagnell.
- Steve Brooker (born 1981), footballer with 261 club caps.
- James Nash (born 1985), World Touring Car Championship driver, lives in Newport Pagnell.
- Leah Williamson (born 1997), footballer, plays for Arsenal W.F.C., captains England.

== See also ==
- Adjacent parishes:
  - Gayhurst
  - Lathbury
  - Moulsoe (including Milton Keynes East)
  - Great Linford
