= Milton Keynes grid road system =

Top layer of street hierarchy

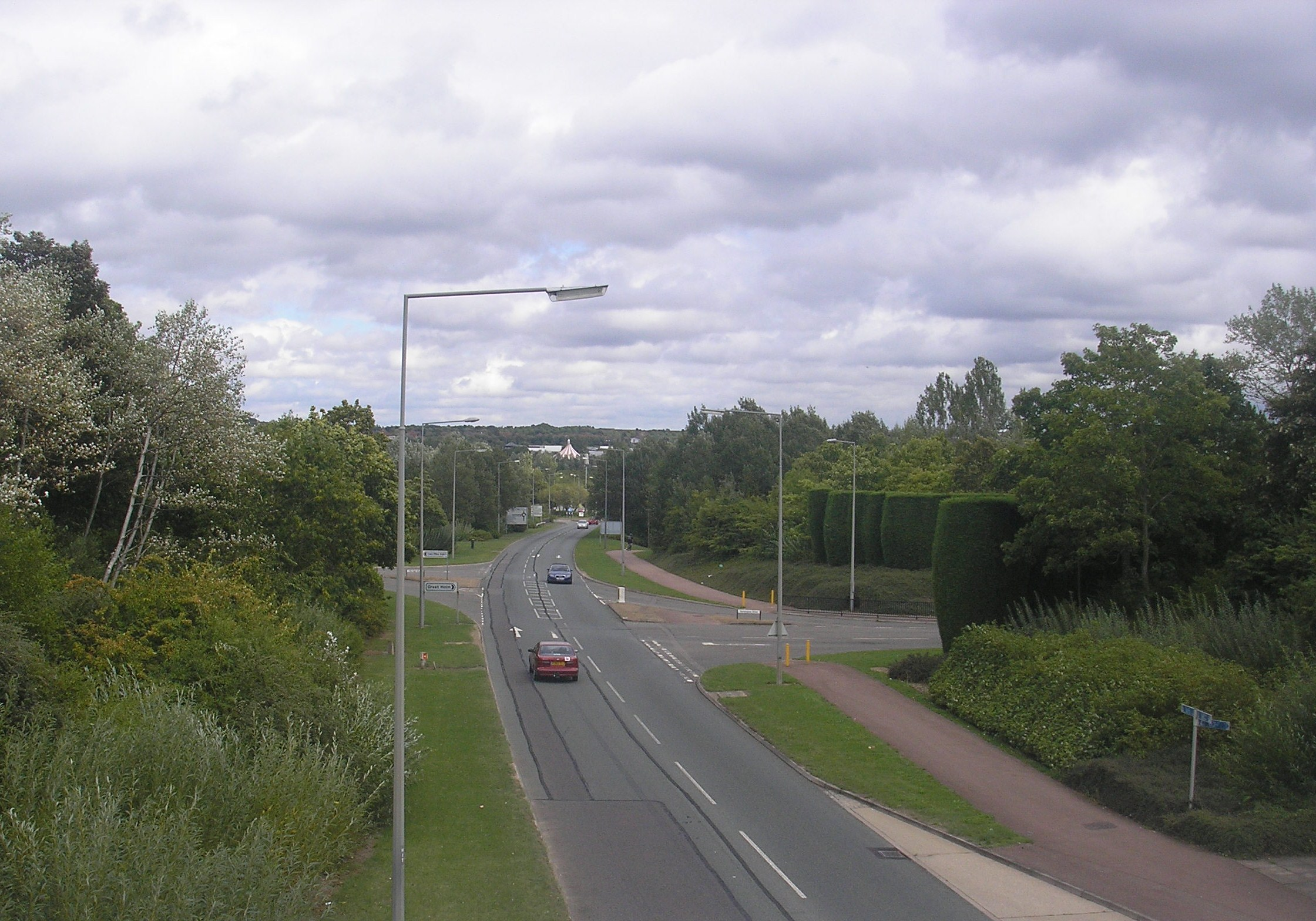
A typical single carriageway grid road, H4 Dansteed Way, looking east from Two Mile Ash. Note the tree lining, the adjacent redway shared path and the staggered junction for local road

The Milton Keynes grid road system is a network of predominantly national speed limit, fully landscaped routes that form the top layer of the street hierarchy for both private and public transport in Milton Keynes, Buckinghamshire. The system is unique in the United Kingdom for its innovative use of street hierarchy principles: the grid roads run in between districts rather than through them. This arrangement permits higher speed limits due to the absence of buildings close to the roads, although more recently some have been limited in part to 40 mph (64 km/h). The grid road system also serves an important purpose of discouraging through-traffic from travelling through neighbourhoods and thus reduces traffic noise and pollution in pedestrian areas. Motor traffic is segregated from pedestrian and leisure cycling traffic, (Note: As noted in the redway system article, some experienced and commuting cyclists may choose the direct grid roads over the meandering redways.) which uses the alternative Milton Keynes redway system. Almost all grid junctions are roundabouts, and the absence of traffic lights (from most) enables free and efficient movement of traffic.

== The grid roads ==
The geography of Milton Keynes – the railway line, Watling Street, Grand Union Canal, M1 motorway – sets up a very strong north–south axis. If you've got to build a city between (them) it is very natural to take a pen and draw the rungs of a ladder. Ten miles by six is the size of this city – 22,000 acres. Do you lay it out like an American city, rigid orthogonal from side to side? Being more sensitive in 1966-7, the designers decided that the grid concept should apply but should be a lazy grid following the flow of land, its valleys, its ebbs and flows. That would be nicer to look at, more economical and efficient to build, and would sit more beautifully as a landscape intervention.

— Professor David Lock, MBE (Note: Professor Lock was visiting professor of town planning at Reading University. He was the chief town planner for CMK.) (Note: Ten miles is about 16 km and 18,000 acres is about 7,300 hectares.)

The grid system consists of 11 roads aligned roughly north–south and 10 aligned roughly east–west. In early planning documents, these were simply designated as "V roads" and "H roads" respectively (for "vertical", roughly north–south, and "horizontal", roughly East/West); these designations have remained popular alongside the subsequent formal (conventional) names. V-roads are named as "Streets", and H-roads as "Ways". The roads are not precisely straight and aligned, and there are several places where two H roads, or two V roads, meet at a junction. The districts enclosed by the grid roads are known as grid squares.

In addition, the A5 road between Old Stratford and Little Brickhill is a grade separated dual carriageway that is independent of the system (built to bypass the old Watling Street route), running between the grid roads but with four interchanges with the system.

Below is a list of the grid roads. Some double as national roads for parts of their routes; these are shown in brackets:

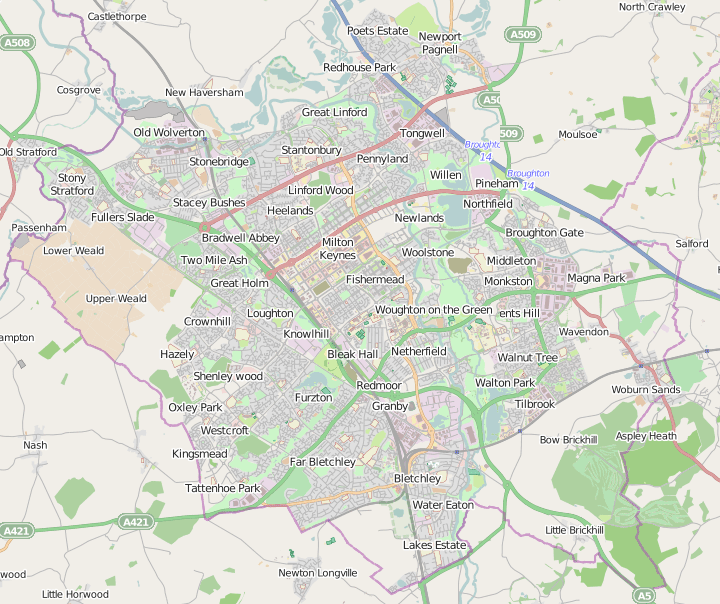
OpenStreetMap mapping of Milton Keynes, showing most of the grid roads

H Roads	V Roads
H1 Ridgeway	V1 Snelshall Street
H2 Millers Way	V2 Tattenhoe Street
H3 Monks Way (A422)	V3 Fulmer Street
H4 Dansteed Way	V4 Watling Street (former A5)
H5 Portway (A509)	V5 Great Monks Street
H6 Childs Way	V6 Grafton Street
H7 Chaffron Way	V7 Saxon Street (B4034)
H8 Standing Way (A421)	V8 Marlborough Street (B4034)
H9 Groveway	V9 Overstreet
H10 Bletcham Way (A4146)	V10 Brickhill Street
	V11 Tongwell Street (A4146)

== The grid squares ==
The grid system was designed such that cross-city traffic would run between districts rather than through them. Neighbourhoods are thus clearly delineated by their surrounding grid-roads (which are permeable to pedestrian and cycle traffic using the Milton Keynes redway network of shared paths that use grade-separated crossings). Consequently, traffic in residential areas is limited and low-speed. The "squares" – actually irregular rectangles – are about 1 km (0.6 mi) wide. Some 20 of the grid squares have at its core one of the historic towns and villages that preceded the foundation of the city; most of the others have a local centre providing convenience shops and services. (Developments outside the original grid system, those since the Milton Keynes Development Corporation was wound up in 1989, lack this structured approach.)

== Characteristics ==
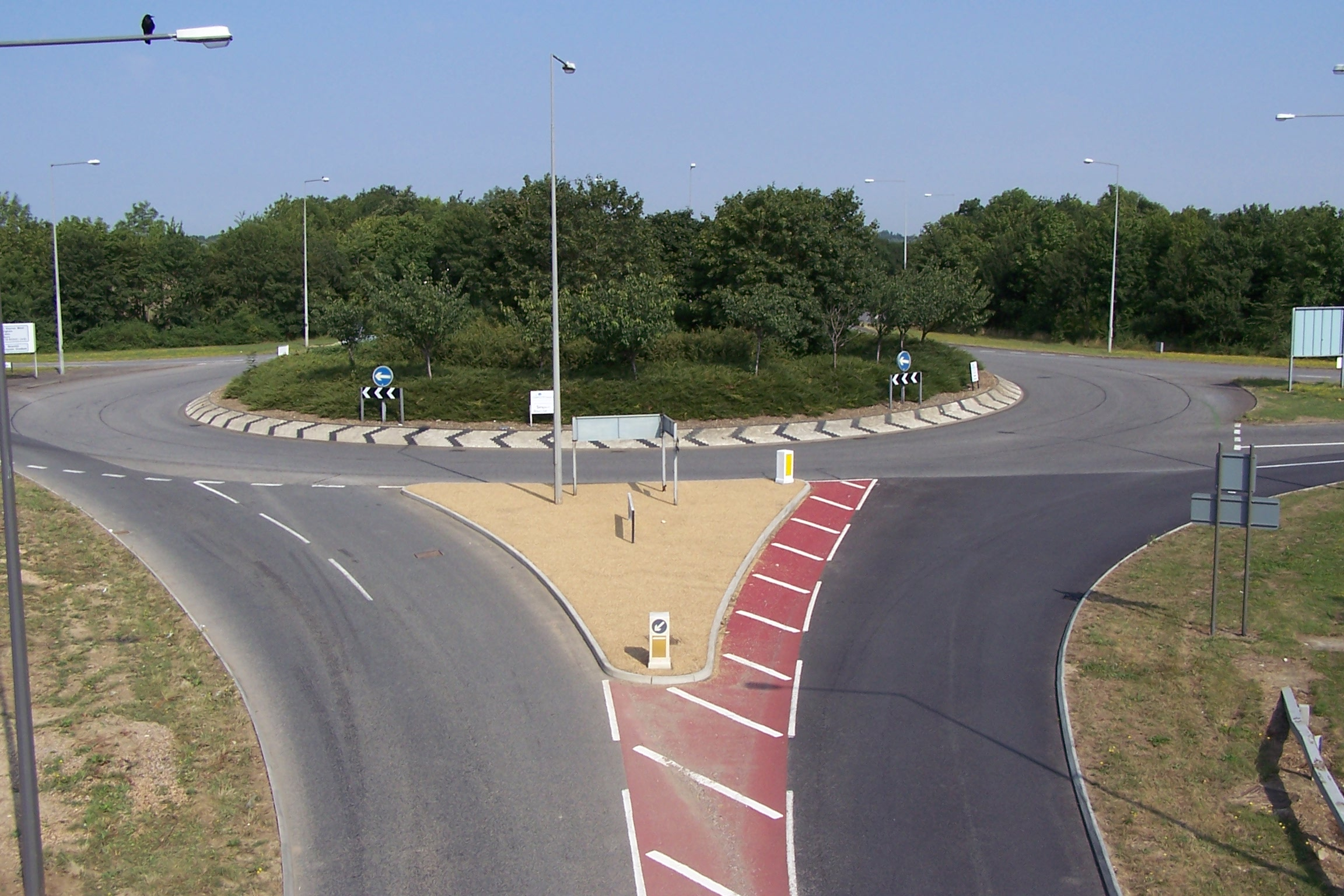
The V8 at its intersection with the H9 Groveway looking north

Grid roads are characterised by high speed limits, generous landscaping and greenery along their routes, all pedestrian crossings being by means of under- or overpasses, roundabouts at every intersection and an almost total lack of road-fronting buildings.

=== Horizontal grid roads (ways) ===
The H1 Ridgeway runs from the southern edge of Stony Stratford, across V4 Watling Street to a point on the V5 east of Wolverton. It is the shortest of all grid roads, having only two grid roundabouts and with a large gap where a bridge over the A5 should be. It serves Stony Stratford, Fullers Slade, Wolverton Mill and Greenleys.

The H2 Millers Way is another short route. It begins at V4 Watling Street, at Fairfields, bridges over the A5 and the West Coast Main Line (WCML), then joins the V6 Grafton Street at Bradville. Among others, its route serves the Milton Keynes Museum.

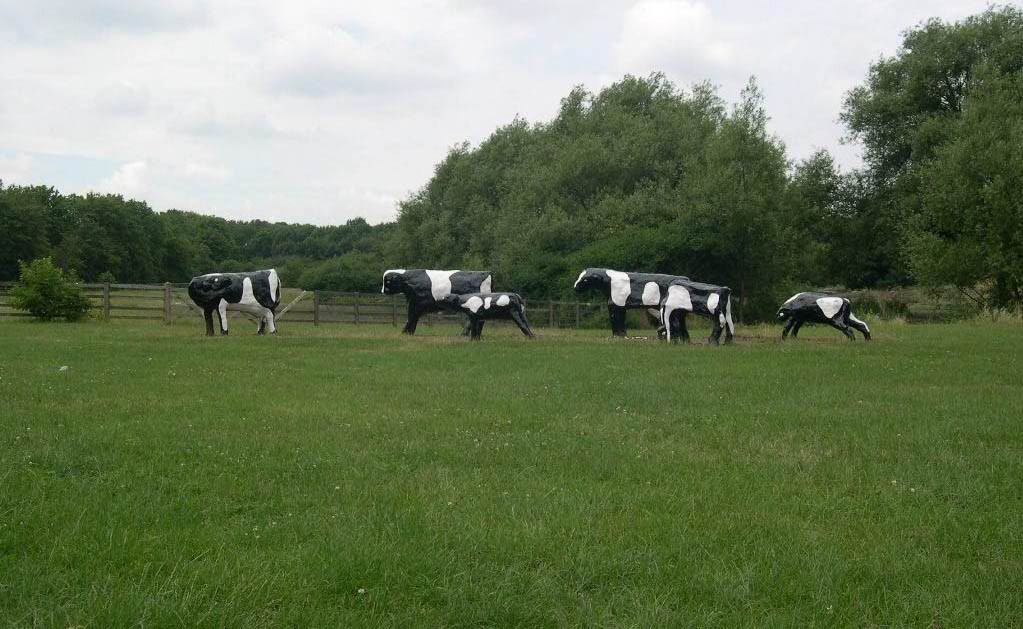
Liz Leyh's "Concrete Cows"

The H3 Monks Way is the most northerly of the major H roads. As the A422, it is a dual carriageway for most of its length. It starts its route as a local single carriageway road, at a roundabout with V4 Watling Street north/south and Calverton Lane continuing westwards. The single carriageway section ends a six-way roundabout with the A5 and the V5 Great Monks Street, near Abbey Hill golf course. From this point, it becomes a dual carriageway and is co-designated as the A422. It continues east under the West Coast Main Line railway until it reaches a bridge over the M1, where the formal H3 designation terminates at Marsh End Roundabout, south of Newport Pagnell. (The route eastbound continues as far as Renny Lodge Roundabout, where it meets and multiplexes with the A509 northbound from M1 Junction 14.) The Concrete Cows (a copy) are the best known landmark on this road, just east of the WCML railway bridge.

The H4 Dansteed Way is a longer route. It starts in the western district of Grange Farm, crosses Linford Wood and ends formally at a roundabout with V11 Tongwell Street and Willen Road, near Tongwell.

The H5 Portway begins its life in Oakhill as a single carriageway and remains as such up until its junction with the A5. From there it becomes a dual carriageway and becomes the A509. It runs along the top edge of Central Milton Keynes, over Willen Lake and terminates at Northfield Roundabout with H6 Childs Way near M1 Junction 14. The route continues on as Fen Street in Broughton (the former A5130 road).

The H6 Childs Way runs from Whitney in the west of Milton Keynes at Kingsmead to a point short of Junction 14 of the M1 motorway in the east. The H6 starts as a 30 mph (48 km/h) local distributor road between the districts of Kingsmead and Whitney. After crossing Whitney Roundabout the road becomes 60 mph (97 km/h) but remains as a single carriageway. After bridging Powis Lane in between Westcroft and Oxley Park the road becomes a dual carriageway at Shenley Roundabout. Subsequently, it bridges both the A5 and the WCML railway. The road then crosses the V6 Grafton Street and runs along the southern edge of Central Milton Keynes and Campbell Park before passing Willen Lake. After this it passes the original Milton Keynes village and then curves up to meet the A509, briefly becoming the A4146.

The H7 Chaffron Way is one of the longest grid roads but is a single carriageway for the entirety of its route. It starts in the district of Tattenhoe Park where it had a 300-metre extension built in 2007, runs past Westcroft District Centre, Furzton Lake, The National Bowl, bridges the A5 and the West Coast Main Line in one go, then crosses the valley of the River Ouzel before terminating at a roundabout next to Broughton. In March 2010, the route onward (Countess Way) was opened which links to Newport Road (former A5130) in Brooklands, a dual carriageway with a permanent bus lane on each side with traffic lights at either end.

H8 Standing Way is a dual carriageway that crosses MK from west to east, co-designated as the A421. The route begins at the Kingston Roundabout near Wavendon, west of Junction 13 of the M1. Its route takes north of the Open University campus, Milton Keynes University Hospital, over the A5 and the WCML, and finally leaves for Buckingham at Tattenhoe.

The H9 Groveway is partly dual-carriageway, running from the major roundabout junction with the A5 and V6 Grafton Street and terminating between Brinklow and Wavendon Gate, at a roundabout junction with Newport Road, the A421 and the H8 Standing Way.

The H10 Bletcham Way starts as a dual carriageway at the three-way Granby Roundabout with the V6 Grafton Street and V4 Watling Street at Denbigh. A short distance after this point it reduces to single carriageway as it passes the industrial estates of Mount Farm and Fenny Lock. At the end of this one-kilometre stretch the road crosses under the A5 at an unusual bi-graded triple roundabout, the eastern part of which forms a dogbone interchange. From here it reverts to being dual carriageway and takes on the designation of A4146. It remains like this for two grid stretches before the A4146 turns off onto the V11 Tongwell Street. The H10 then continues east, again as a single carriageway for a short distance before finishing as a local distributor in the district of Old Farm Park on the very south eastern edge of Milton Keynes.

=== Vertical grid roads (streets) ===
V1 Snellshall Street begins at Whitney and ends at Tattenhoe in the south west of Milton Keynes.

V2 Tattenhoe Street begins at Hazeley in the west of Milton Keynes and travels south to end at Windmill Hill in Far Bletchley in the south west of Milton Keynes. Its route takes it past Woodhill.

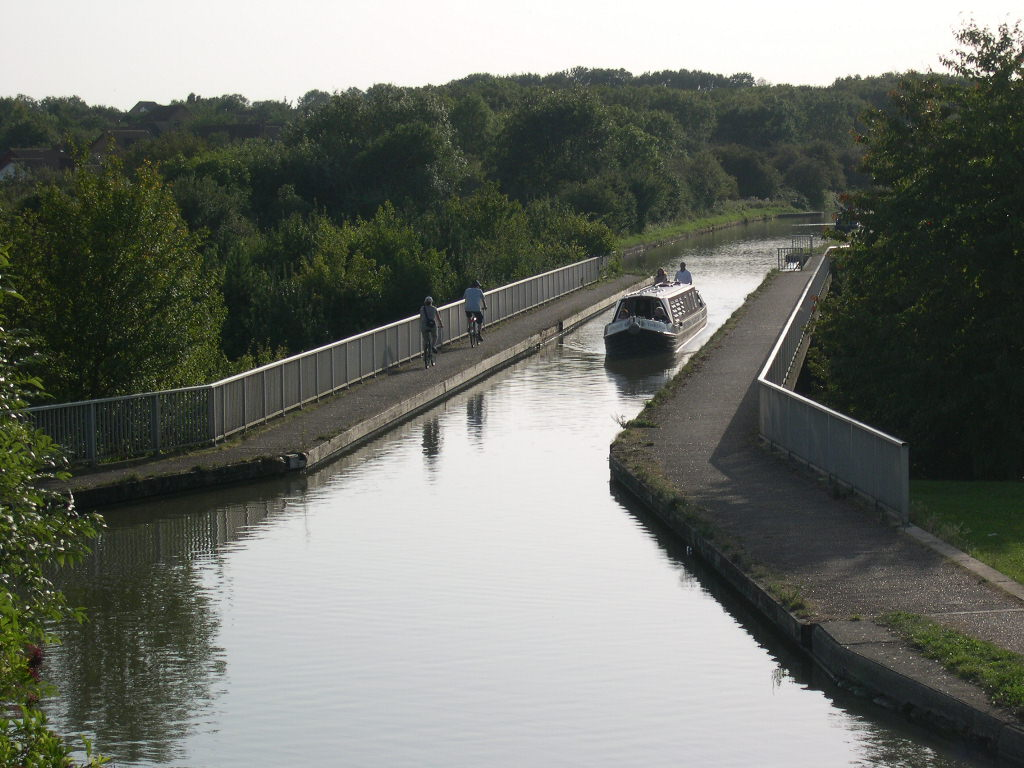
The Grand Union Canal passes over V6 Grafton Street between Bradville and New Bradwell on the modern Bradwell Aqueduct, built specifically to accommodate it.

The V3 Fulmer Street starts at is northern end between the districts of Crownhill and Grange Farm at a three (soon to be four) arm roundabout with the H4. It runs south crossing the H5, H6 and H7 before terminating at the H8, continuing on in the form of Shenley Road into West Bletchley.

The V4 Watling Street is part of the longer national Watling Street. Its northern end is just south of Stony Stratford, at a junction with H1 Ridgeway; the route north to Old Stratford (Northamptonshire) continues as Queen Eleanor Street (the Stony Stratford bypass). Its southern end is to the north of Fenny Stratford, at a roundabout where it meets V6 Grafton Street and H10 Bletcham Way. The original alignment continues south from here as Denbigh Road, regaining its identity at a roundabout with V7 Saxon Street.

The V5 Great Monks Street runs from Wolverton Mill to Great Holm and Two Mile Ash. It is single carriageway for its entire length.

The V6 Grafton Street is a major local road in Milton Keynes key to the layout and urban form of the 'new city'. It starts beside Wolverton railway station in the north-west of Milton Keynes, between Wolverton and New Bradwell and extends as far as Denbigh (where it provides access to the Stadium:mk), where it terminates in a roundabout with the H10 Bletcham Way, V4 Watling Street and Denbigh Rd.

The V7 Saxon Street starts off near New Bradwell in the north of the city as a single carriageway and remains as such past Stantonbury to its junction with the H4 where it becomes a dual carriageway. In this form it runs straight through the heart of Central Milton Keynes between the Centre:MK and the Church of Christ the Cornerstone and then returns to being a single carriageway after its junction with the H7. It then has a 40 mph (64 km/h) speed restriction on it for two grid squares until the H9. After passing Stadium MK and crossing the H10, it becomes a dual carriageway once more and terminates in central Bletchley.

The V8 Marlborough Street (B4034) runs from Stantonbury to Mount Farm in Denbigh East. It is a dual carriageway for most of length, as it is one of the more important routes. It runs in a cutting through Central Milton Keynes. As of December 2019, its planned connection to H10 Bletcham Way and the A5 remains neither built nor funded.

The V9 Overstreet is the shortest of all the 'V' roads, it runs from H3 Monks Way to H5 Portway. It is single carriageway the entire distance. It serves Downs Barn, Downhead Park, Neath Hill and Pennyland. It is notable for Neath Hill Local Centre designed by Wayland Tunley as being one of the few local centres in Milton Keynes built to straddle the grid roads rather than being embedded within the interior of the grid square. Overgate continues from H5 Portway through Campbell Park to H6 Childs Way though this is not signed V9.

The V10 Brickhill Street is mainly a single carriageway, but it is important in being one of the few that run continuously between the north and the south of the city. It is only a dual carriageway for 200 metres south of the H4 roundabout at Willen. It begins at a roundabout with Wolverton Road, near Giffard Park and Newport Pagnell, and heads south serving much of the east of MK. It terminates at a roundabout just west of Bow Brickhill railway station to the south of Caldecotte.

The V11 Tongwell Street begins at a roundabout near Tongwell, following the existing southbound route of Willen Road from Newport Pagnell. It is a single carriageway to its junction with the H6 where it picks up the A4146 road. It is then a dual carriageway as far as the H10, then finally a single carriageway again for a very short distance into the districts of Old Farm Park and Browns Wood.

== Astronomical alignment ==
Despite a widely believed urban myth, the grid system is not deliberately aligned to midsummer sunrise. (Note: "Midsummer sunrise is somewhere to the east – not actually on the alignment of Midsummer Boulevard: [...] But it was a good urban myth to lay down" – David Lock.)
