= Bradwell, Milton Keynes =

Civil parish in Milton Keynes, England

Coordinates: 52.05°N 0.787°W

Bradwell
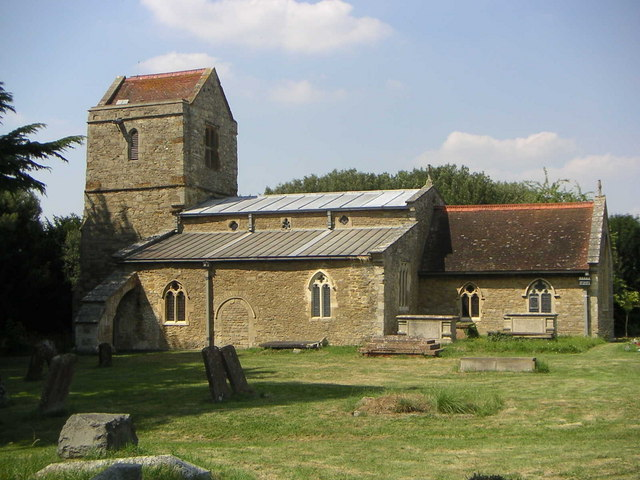
- St Lawrence Church, Bradwell (built 1860)

- Location within Buckinghamshire
- Interactive map of Bradwell
- Population: 9,662 (2021 census)
- OS grid reference: SP835395
- Civil parish: Bradwell
- District: City of Milton Keynes
- Unitary authority: Milton Keynes City Council
- Ceremonial county: Buckinghamshire
- Region: South East
- Country: England
- Sovereign state: United Kingdom
- Post town: MILTON KEYNES
- Postcode district: MK13
- Dialling code: 01908
- Police: Thames Valley
- Fire: Buckinghamshire
- Ambulance: South Central
- UK Parliament: Milton Keynes North
- Website: bradwell-pc.gov.uk

Bradwell is an ancient village, modern neighbourhood and civil parish in Milton Keynes, Buckinghamshire, England, situated approximately 1 mile (1.6 km) north-west of Central Milton Keynes. The civil parish includes Bradwell Abbey, a former Benedictine priory, which was founded in 1155 and dissolved in about 1540, but the abbey and its immediate environs were always a separate ecclesiastical parish.

The village name is an Old English language word and means broad spring. In the Domesday Book of 1086 the village was recorded as Bradewelle.

There was a YHA youth hostel in the village (near the church and Bradwell Bury): the YHA closed it during the COVID-19 pandemic and terminated its lease in 2021.

== Civil parish ==
The parish of Bradwell consists of the Bradwell village grid square, along with Bradwell Abbey, Heelands, Rooksley, and Bradwell Common. The parish had a population of 9,662 according to the 2021 census. The parish is bounded by the railway line or the A5 to the west, Monks Way to the north, Portway to the east, and Dansteed Way to the south.

St. Lawrence's Church is a Grade II*-listed building, dating from the 13th century, and receiving its first vicar in 1223. It is believed to contain the oldest change ringing bells still in use, two of which were cast in 1297 by Michael de Wymbish of London.

Adjoining the sports field is the Bradwell Conservation Area, which is centered on St Lawrence's Field and is administered by the parish council as a nature conservation area.

On Vicarage Road is the Bradwell Memorial Hall, built as the village's war memorial after World War I.

On Primrose Road is King George's Field in memorial to King George V with a children's play area.

== History and heritage ==
=== Bradwell Village ===
Bradwell Bury beside the parish church is a moated site and the remains of an associated manor house which once formed part of a more extensive monument: it is Scheduled Monument. The nearby Bradwell Castle mound is also a Scheduled Monument. Bradwell House and the Church of St James are Grade II* listed; there are a further 25 buildings and structures listed as Grade II.

=== Bradwell Abbey ===
Bradwell Abbey is a Scheduled Monument, urban studies site (and a modern district). The site was once the location of a Benedictine priory, founded in 1155. The only remaining ecclesiastic building, the Chapel of St Mary, is a Grade I listed building. There are a further five Grade II listed buildings or structures on the Abbey grounds.

=== Bradwell railway station ===
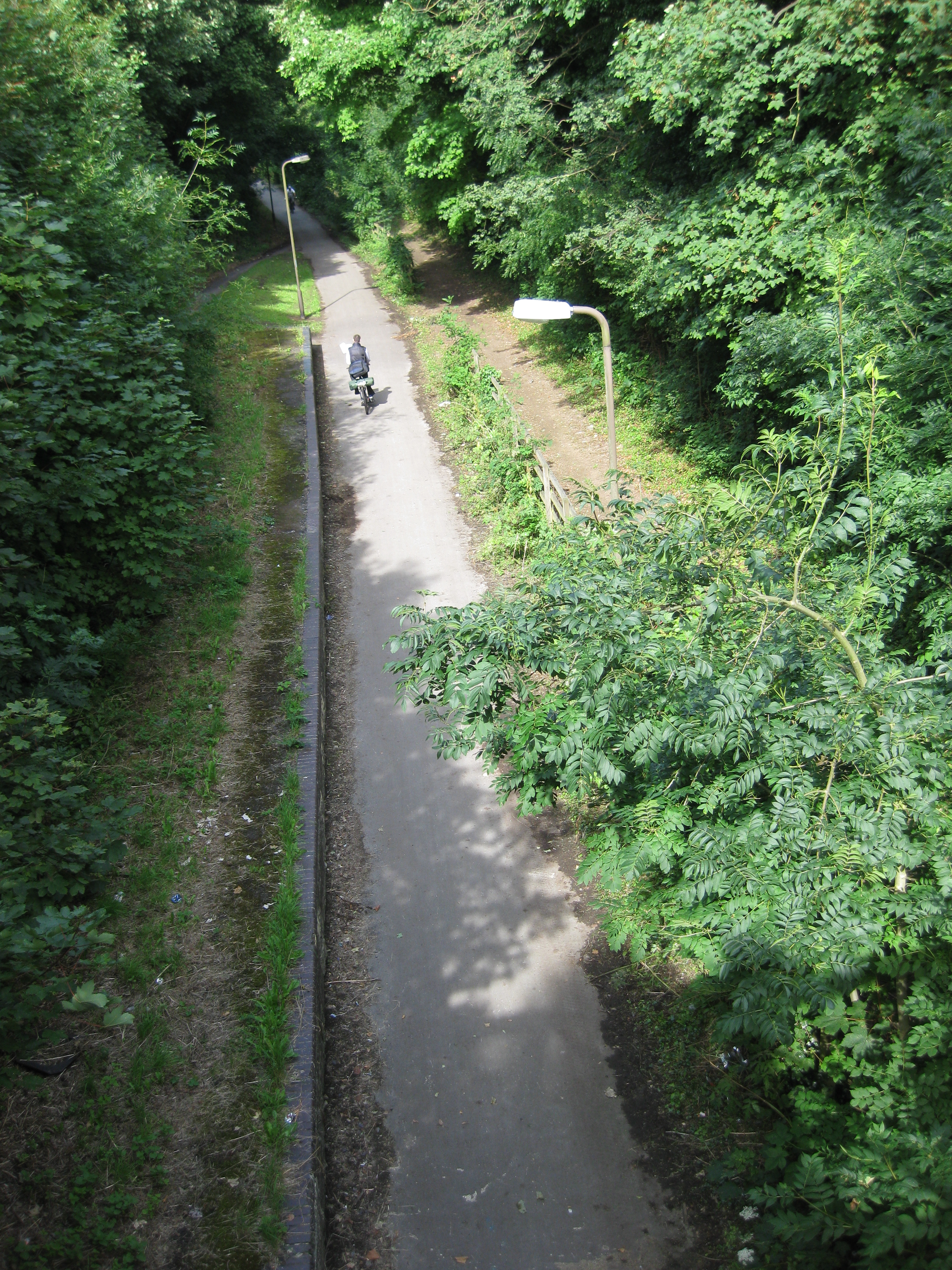
Bradwell station in 2009, with the trackbed converted to a rail trail

Bradwell railway station, which was on the Wolverton–Newport Pagnell branch line, served Bradwell from 1867 to 1964. In the present day, the former railway line (now a rail trail that is part of the redway network) forms the boundary between Bradville (in Stantonbury CP) and New Bradwell CP; the station platform is on the New Bradwell side.

== Sport and Leisure ==
Bradwell has a Non-League football team Old Bradwell United F.C. who play at Abbey Road, where there is a large sports field with a cricket pitch and several football pitches. The Old Bradwell Tennis Club is also affiliated to the Bradwell Sports and Social Club which has the use of these facilities.

Bradwell Bowls Club enters competitive teams in the local league.

Rooksley, at the western edge of the parish, has an important Karting track (not in Bradwell parish).

== Demographics ==
The demographic profile of Bradwell electoral ward is given at UK Census (2011). "Local Area Report – Bradwell ward (1237322025)". Nomis. Office for National Statistics..

== See also ==
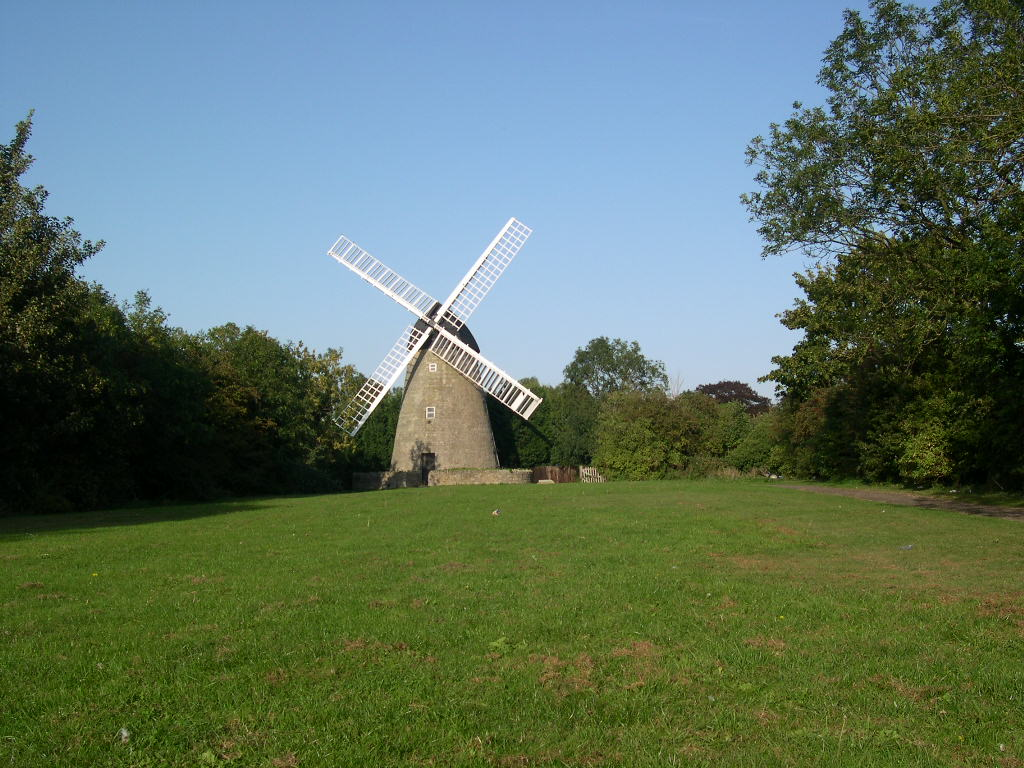
The Bradwell Windmill is in nearby Bradville

- Other places (and people) named Bradwell
- New Bradwell
- Bradville (for the "Bradwell" windmill)
