= Newport Pagnell railway station =

Former railway station in Buckinghamshire, England

Newport Pagnell
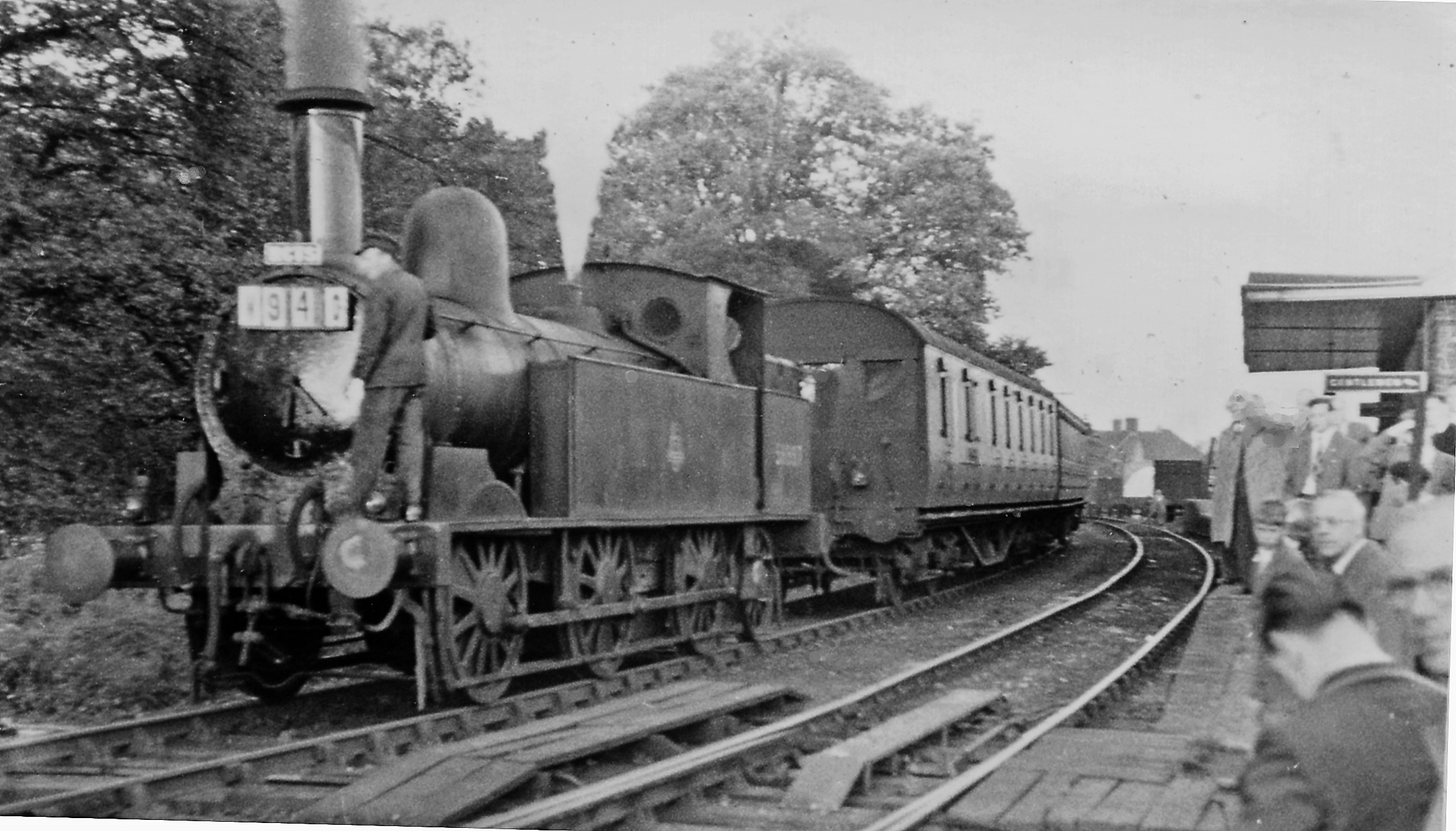
- LNWR Webb Coal Tank no. 58887, 1954.

General information
- Location: Newport Pagnell, City of Milton Keynes, England
- Coordinates: 52.0834°N 0.7305°W
- Grid reference: SP871435
- Platforms: 1

Other information
- Status: Disused

History
- Original company: Newport Pagnell Railway
- Pre-grouping: London and North Western Railway

Key dates
- 2 September 1867: Opened
- 7 September 1964: Closed to passengers
- 22 May 1967: Closed completely
Location

Newport Pagnell railway station served the town of Newport Pagnell, in Buckinghamshire, England, between 1867 and 1967. It was the north-eastern terminus of the Wolverton–Newport Pagnell line.

== History ==
Opened in 1867, the station consisted of a brick built station building and extensive goods facilities.

The London and North Western Railway opened a small motive power depot in 1886, at the south side of the line, near to the station. This was closed on 15 June 1955 and was demolished.

The last passenger train ran on 5 September 1964 and the last goods train on 22 May 1967.

Preceding station	Disused railways	Following station
Great Linford; Line and station closed	London and North Western Railway; Wolverton to Newport Pagnell Line	Terminus

== The site today ==
The station site is now under Sheppard's Close, a modern residential development. (Note: This source misspells the name of the modern development as "Shepherd's".) The trackbed is now a rail trail, part of the Milton Keynes redway system. There is a commemorative column on the site of the final signal post just short of the station site. (Note: "Newport Nobby" was the nickname for the train.)
