= Great Linford railway station =

Former railway station in Buckinghamshire, England

Great Linford
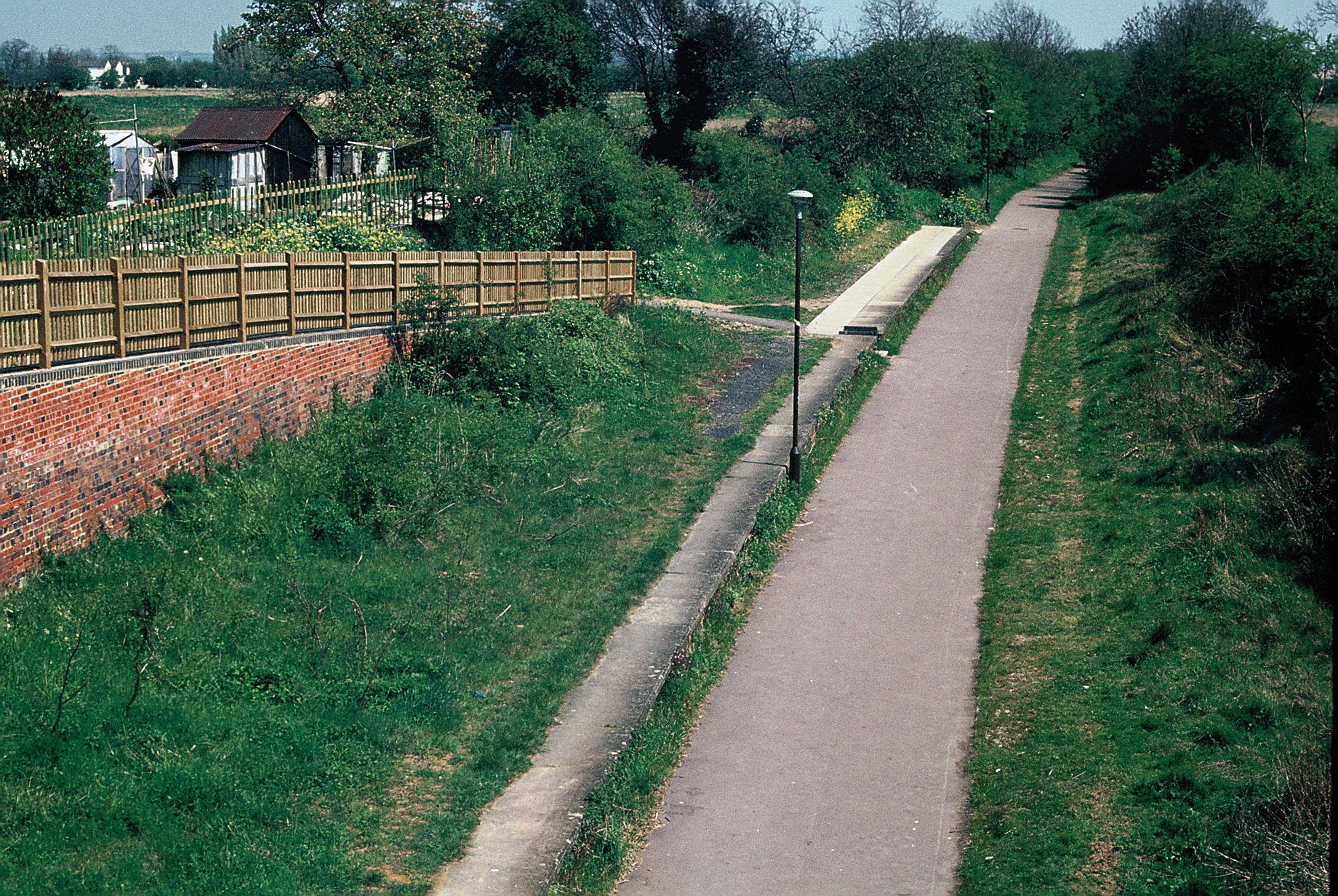
- The site of the station in 1980

General information
- Location: Great Linford, Milton Keynes, England
- Coordinates: 52.0757°N 0.7546°W
- Grid reference: SP855427
- Platforms: 1

Other information
- Status: Disused

History
- Original company: Newport Pagnell Railway
- Pre-grouping: London and North Western Railway

Key dates
- 2 September 1867: Station opened
- 7 September 1964: Station closed
Location

Great Linford railway station served the village of Great Linford, in Buckinghamshire, England. It was a stop on the Wolverton to Newport Pagnell line between 1867 and 1964.

== History ==
Built next to the Linford Wharf on the Grand Union Canal, the station opened to traffic in 1867. The station consisted of a brick built station building, and single platform. The station did not have a goods yard or sidings.

The last passenger train ran on 5 September 1964 and the last goods train passed through on 22 May 1967. The station building was demolished.

Preceding station	Disused railways	Following station
Bradwell; Line and station closed	London and North Western Railway; Wolverton to Newport Pagnell Line	Newport Pagnell; Line and station closed

== The site today ==
The platform remains intact and the trackbed through the station has been converted into a cycle way, forming part of the Milton Keynes redway system.
