= Bradwell railway station =

Disused railway station in England

Bradwell
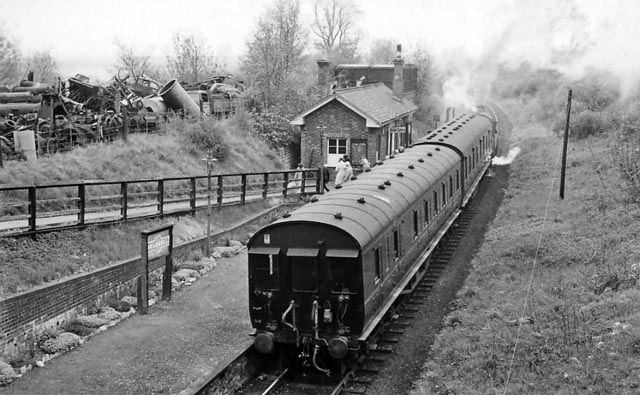

General information
- Location: New Bradwell, Milton Keynes; England
- Coordinates: 52.06372°N 0.78648°W
- Grid reference: SP833413
- Platforms: 1

Other information
- Status: Disused

History
- Original company: Newport Pagnell Railway
- Pre-grouping: London and North Western Railway

Key dates
- 2 September 1867: Station opened
- 7 September 1964: Station closed
Location

Bradwell railway station was a railway station on the Wolverton–Newport Pagnell line. It served both Bradwell and the new village of New Bradwell in Buckinghamshire. The station, which consisted of a brick-built station building, and single platform, opened to traffic in 1867.

The last passenger train ran on 5 September 1964 but freight trains continued to pass through until 22 May 1967. The station building was demolished although the platform remains intact. The trackbed through the station has been converted into a shared path (footpath/cycle way), forming part of the Milton Keynes redway system.

== Services ==
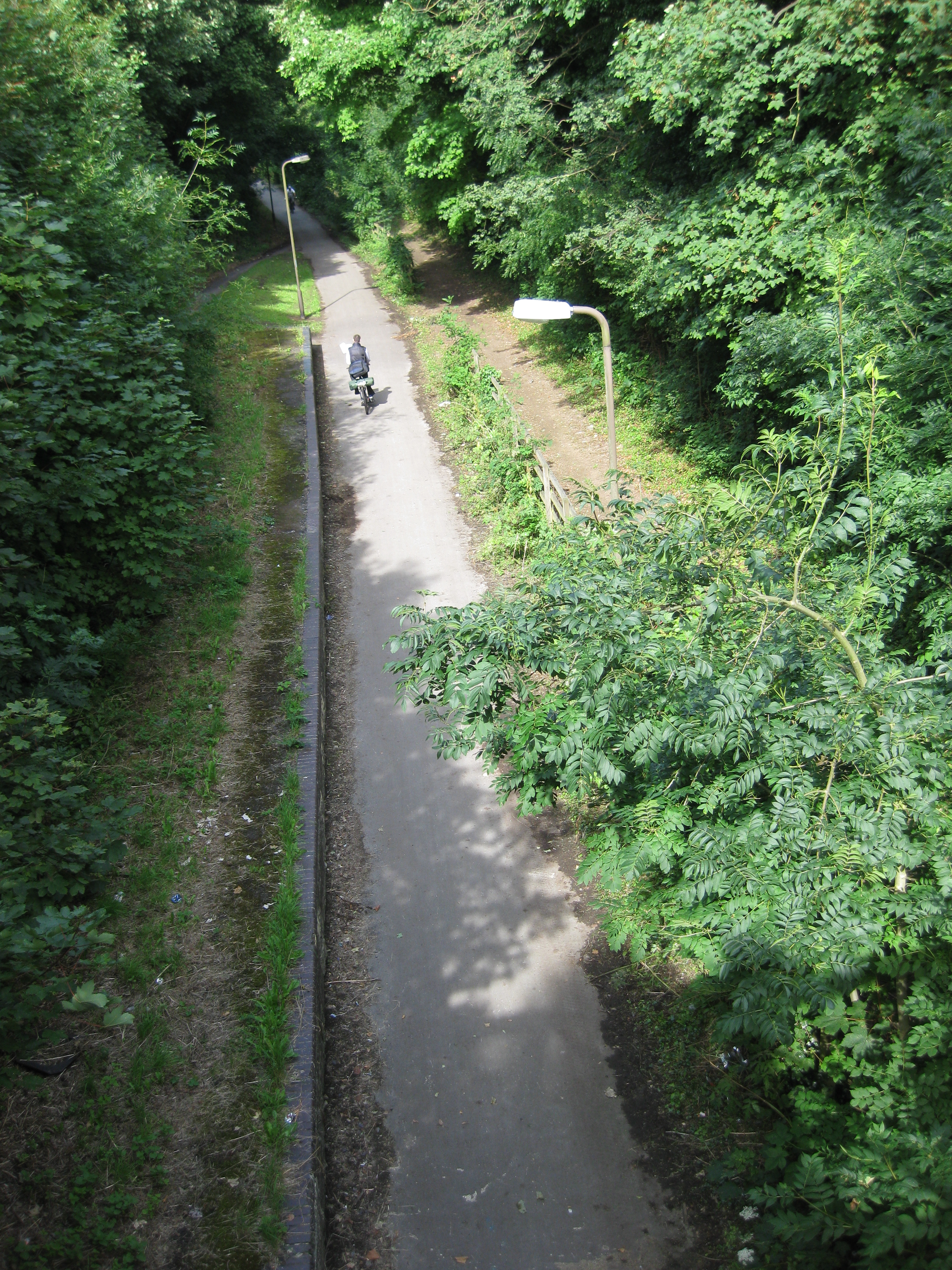
Bradwell station in 2009, with the trackbed converted to a rail path

Preceding station	Disused railways	Following station
Wolverton; Line closed, station open	London and North Western Railway; Wolverton to Newport Pagnell Line	Great Linford; Line and station closed
