= Wolverton railway station =

Railway station in Buckinghamshire, England

Wolverton
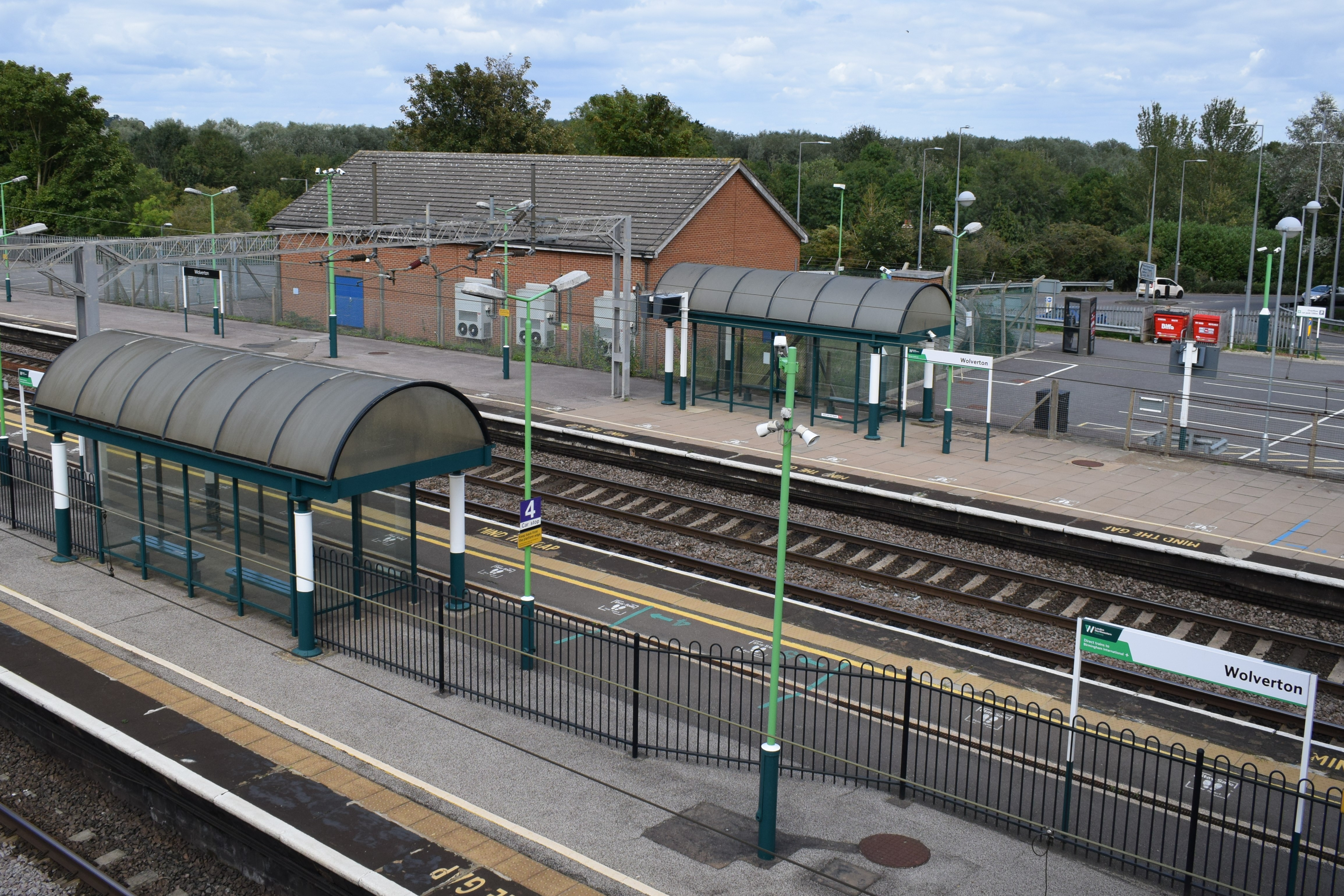

General information
- Location: Wolverton, City of Milton Keynes, England
- Coordinates: 52.0653°N 0.80357°W
- Grid reference: SP820415
- Manager: London Northwestern Railway
- Platforms: 4

Construction
- Accessible: No (stairs to platforms, step up to trains)

Other information
- Station code: WOL
- Classification: DfT category E

History
- Opened: 1838

Key dates
- September 1838: First station opened by L&BR
- November 1840: Station relocated to new track alignment
- 1881: Station rebuilt for a second time
- June 2012: New station building opened

Passengers
- 2021/22: ▲0.210 million
- 2022/23: ▲0.267 million
- 2023/24: ▲0.299 million
- 2024/25: ▲0.339 million
- 2024/25: ▲0.350 million
Location
Notes
- Passenger statistics from the Office of Rail and Road

Wolverton railway station serves Wolverton, a constituent town of Milton Keynes, in Buckinghamshire, England; it is near to Stony Stratford and New Bradwell, and villages in West Northamptonshire. It lies on the West Coast Main Line, about 52 miles (84 km) from Euston, between Milton Keynes Central and Northampton.

== Location ==
The station lies at the eastern end of Wolverton, near the junction of Stratford Rd with Grafton Street. In the chainage notation traditionally used on the railway, its location on the line is 52 miles 33 chains (52.41 mi; 84.35 km) from Euston.

It is one of the seven stations serving the Milton Keynes urban area. (Note: The others are Milton Keynes Central, Bletchley, Fenny Stratford, Bow Brickhill, Woburn Sands and Aspley Guise.)

== History ==
=== Station building ===
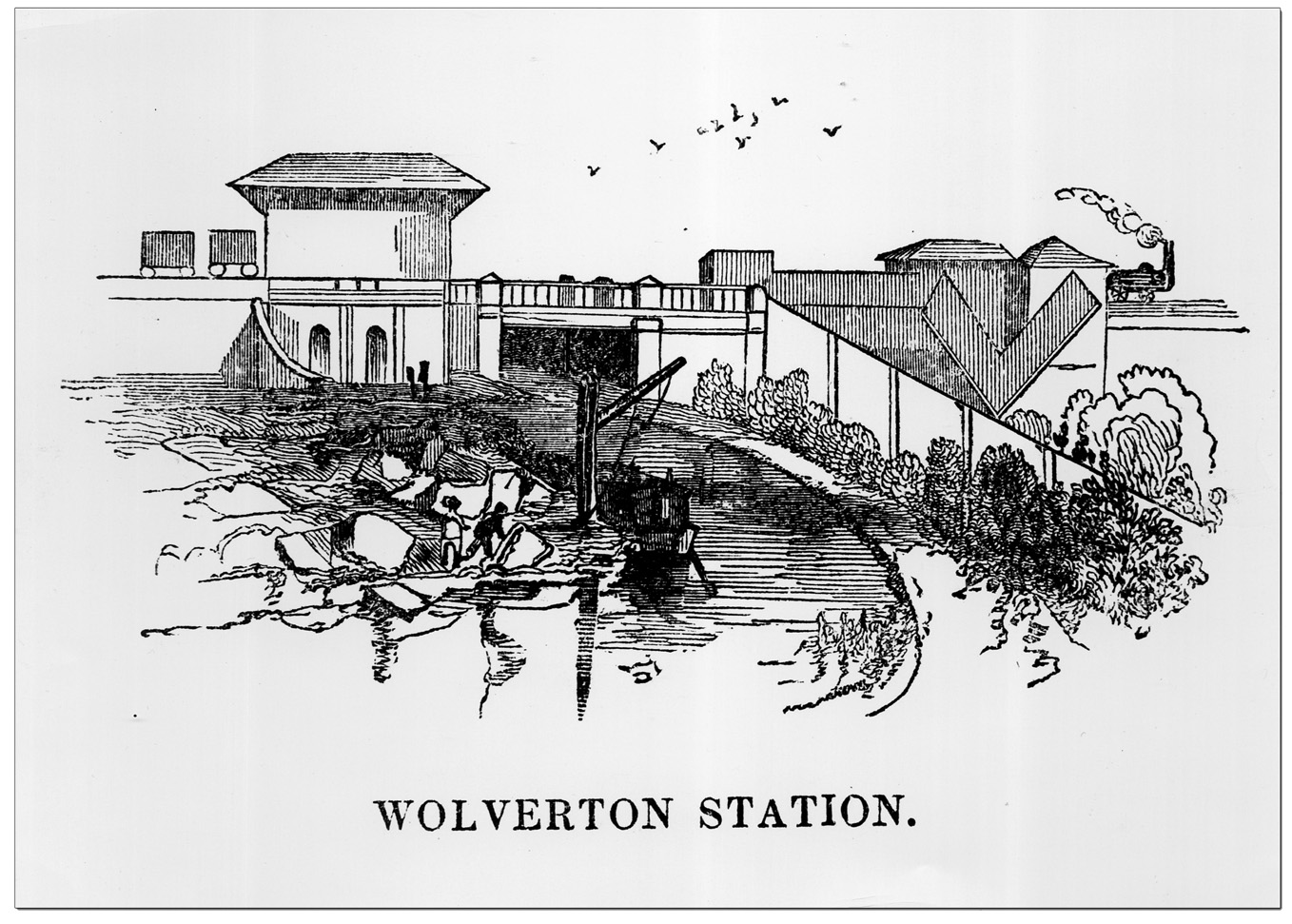
The station 1838

The first station was built for the opening of the London and Birmingham Railway on 17 September 1838, on the embankment just north of the canal above Wolverton Park. It proved to be temporary as the railway company purchased an additional 13.5 acres (5.5 ha) to the south, where it built a larger, more permanent station in 1840, at the east end of Church Street. The new station included refreshment rooms which employed a full-time staff of 22 in 1849.

A hotel was planned but never built. The waiting room was lavishly redecorated for the visit of Queen Victoria in 1844, who spent that Christmas as the guest of the Duke of Buckingham and Chandos. In 1881, the main line was rerouted a little to the east (Note: See 'Wolverton bend' below.) to allow for expansion of the Wolverton Works and a new station opened in August 1881. The ticket hall was a wooden building on a new bridge above the railway line and passengers needed to reach the platforms via flights of stairs. The wooden station stood here for over 100 years until British Rail demolished it in about 1990. For many years after the wooden station building was demolished, Wolverton station was a temporary shed in the car park at track level.

A new replacement station building was built and opened on 21 June 2012. The new building is at track level and access to all but the adjacent platform is via stairs. It was designed by engineers Sinclair Knight Merz and BPR Architects.

In mid-September 2012, the Transport Minister Norman Baker announced in a written answer that the Government had approved London Midland's request to reduce the opening hours of the new ticket office, from the previous 06:00–12:00 to 06:15–11:00 henceforth. As of August 2026, these continue to be the scheduled hours of operation.

=== Wolverton Works ===
The 1833 Act of Parliament approving the London and Birmingham Railway included a clause that specified that a railway works be built around the mid-point, as it was considered scientifically unsafe at the time for railway locomotives to move more than 50 miles (80 km) without further inspection. After surveying all possible sites, Wolverton was chosen due to its co-location alongside the wharfing facilities of the Grand Union Canal, thereby also enabling the railway company to gain an easy agreement to build a viaduct over the canal company's land at this point. Provision of refreshment facilities for passengers availing of the stop was (at least initially) the primary purpose of the station, located as it was in (at the time) a very rural area.

=== Wolverton bend ===
With the advent of fast trains, Wolverton gained notoriety among railwaymen for its famously tight curve. The curve was a result of the station and main line being moved eastward in 1881, to permit extension of the Wolverton Works. The path of the original route remains in place through the Works site and includes Robert Stephenson's (Grade II* listed) bridge over the Grand Union Canal. The Advanced Passenger Train failed its trials here in the early 1990s but the Pendolino tilting trains passed them in the early 2000s.

=== Wolverton Viaduct ===
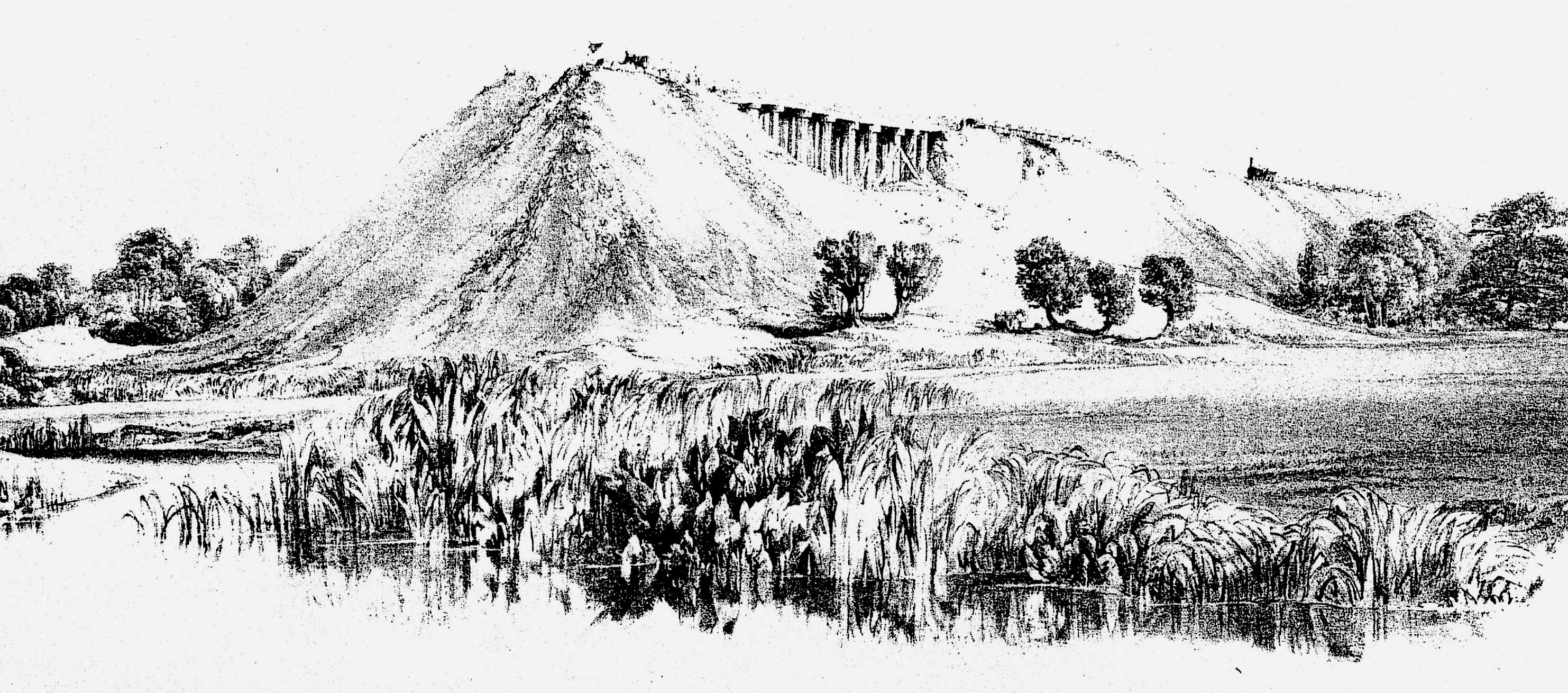
Making the embankment - Wolverton Valley (Great Ouse), 28 June 1837.

To cross the valley of the River Great Ouse a little to the north, the company built a six-arch viaduct in 1838, at a cost then of £38,000. (Note: About £3,600,000 today) The viaduct was also designed by Robert Stephenson and is described by Historic England in its Grade II listing as "the most impressive of the several viaducts on the line, being taller, more elaborately treated and with wider arches. It was one of the principal landmarks of the first trunk railway and one of the earliest viaducts on this scale".

=== Newport Pagnell Branch Line (closed) ===
From 1865 to 1964, there was a branch line from Wolverton to Newport Pagnell, primarily for employees of Wolverton Works. In 1964 the line was closed to passengers by the Beeching cuts and freight ceased in 1967. Between 1817 and 1864, the section from Great Linford to Newport Pagnell was an arm of the Grand Junction Canal which was then drained to become the track-bed. The route from Wolverton to Newport Pagnell is now a redway. Along the redway, the platforms at New Bradwell and Great Linford are still in place, as are a signal post at Newport Pagnell and an iron bridge taking the line (now the redway) over the Grand Union Canal.

=== Accidents ===
In 1847, an accident just south of the (original) station caused the deaths of seven people.

== Platforms ==
The station has four platforms, of which just two are normally in use. Platforms 1 & 2 are the fast lines and these trains rarely stop here: they are used by London Northwestern only during works and Avanti West Coast in emergency. Platforms 3 & 4 are used frequently by London Northwestern: Avanti West Coast services pass these platforms (without stopping) only during works.

Access to platforms is via long flights of stairs to a pedestrian overbridge, making the station unusable for people with mobility impairment.

== Facilities ==
There is a ticket office which is open on weekday mornings from 06:15 to 11:00.

Although categorised as "step-free access category B3", this station is not realistically accessible for passengers with mobility impairments because all but one of the platforms are only reachable by long stairways.

== Services ==
All services at Wolverton are operated by London Northwestern Railway.

The typical off-peak service in trains per hour is:

- 2 tph to London Euston
- 2 tph to Birmingham New Street.

During peak hours, the station is served by a number of additional services between London Euston and Northampton.

Preceding station	National Rail	Following station
Northampton towards Birmingham New Street	London Northwestern Railway London–Birmingham	Milton Keynes Central towards London Euston
Historical railways
Castlethorpe Line open, station closed	London and North Western Railway West Coast Main Line	Bletchley Line and station open
	Disused railways	
Bradwell Line and station closed	London and North Western Railway Wolverton to Newport Pagnell Line	Terminus

== See also ==
- Wolverton railway works
- Wolverton and Stony Stratford Tramway
- Denbigh Hall railway station. (Note: Pending construction of Kilsby Tunnel, passengers alighted at Denbigh Hall and transferred to horse-drawn coaches to Rugby station via the Watling Street turnpike.)
