= New Bradwell =

Civil parish in Milton Keynes, England

Coordinates: 52.06731°N 0.78349°W

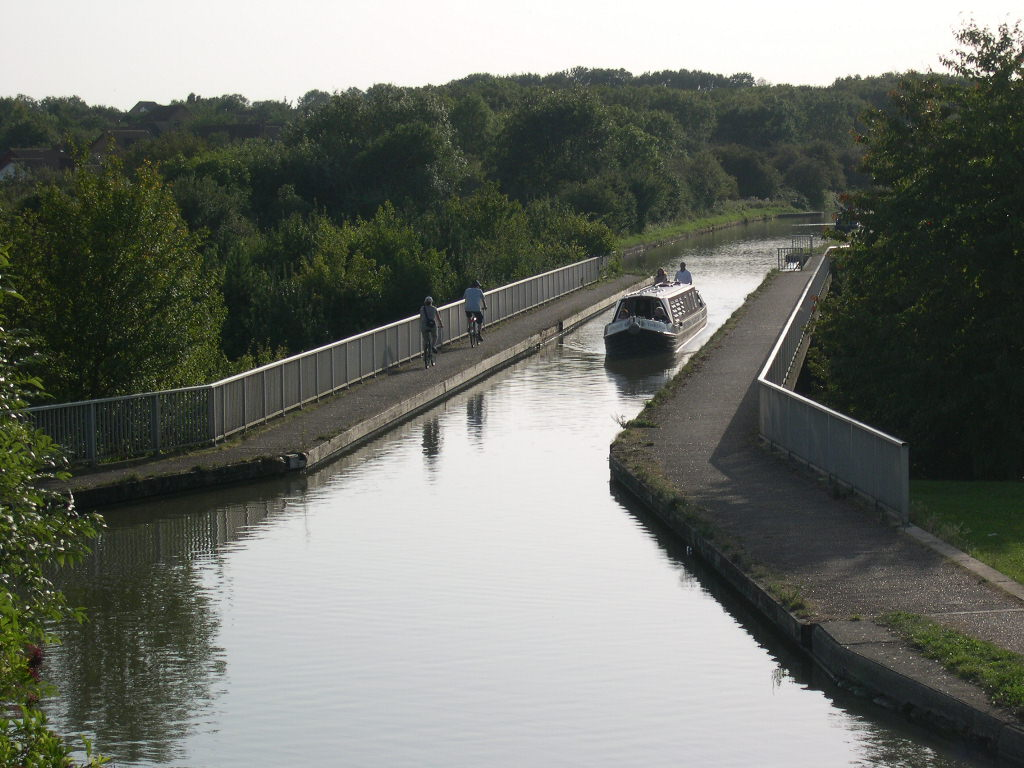
- Grand Union Canal as it passes between Stonebridge (in the distance) and New Bradwell

- Location within Buckinghamshire
- Interactive map of New Bradwell
- Population: 3,509 (2021 census)
- OS grid reference: SP830414
- Civil parish: New Bradwell
- District: City of Milton Keynes
- Unitary authority: Milton Keynes City Council
- Ceremonial county: Buckinghamshire
- Region: South East
- Country: England
- Sovereign state: United Kingdom
- Post town: MILTON KEYNES
- Postcode district: MK13
- Dialling code: 01908
- Police: Thames Valley
- Fire: Buckinghamshire
- Ambulance: South Central
- UK Parliament: Milton Keynes North

New Bradwell is (mainly) an Edwardian era village, modern district and civil parish in north-west Milton Keynes, Buckinghamshire, England, about 2 miles (3.2 km) north-west of Central Milton Keynes. Together with Wolverton (on the other side of the West Coast Main Line), it was built primarily to house the workers on the Wolverton railway works.

The original village of Bradwell lies south of New Bradwell.

== History ==
New Bradwell is roughly 150 years old. Exact dates are hard to figure, as buildings such as mill houses and farm houses existed on the site of what is now the village of New Bradwell, long before then. Around 1851 the area was little more than a hamlet, with 381 inhabitants and a local industry of stone quarrying and lime kilns. The first purpose built houses were constructed in 1854 – 1856 as dwellings for workers in the nearby Wolverton works. By 1861 the village had 1,658 inhabitants and over 4,000 by 1906.

Perhaps the most significant date was the expansion of the parish of Stantonbury on 16 July 1857. The old parish of Stanton Barry, or Stantonbury, contained but 750 acres (3.0 km^{2}), and about a dozen scattered houses. By an Order in Council, dated 16 July 1857, a new parish was formed by adding to the old one the hamlet of New Bradwell. The area of the newly formed parish was 904 acres (3.66 km^{2}). There was a ceremony of laying the foundations for the Church of St James and other buildings such as the church schoolhouse on Monday 24 May 1858, which may mark the foundation of the village of New Bradwell as an entity in its own right. The Church of St James was completed in 1860.

Originally this new village was called Stantonbury after the name of the parish.

From 1867 to 1964 the village was served by Bradwell railway station on the now defunct Wolverton to Newport Pagnell line. The line has been repurposed as a rail path, part of the Milton Keynes redway network.

The Grand Union Canal passes between Bradwell and New Bradwell, providing boating and fishing facilities. The modern Bradwell Aqueduct was the first of its kind to be constructed over the Grand Union in over 100 years

=== Heritage ===
New Bradwell has one Grade II* listed building (the Church of St James) and a further eight Grade II (where 57–59 Spencer Street have a single listing).

=== Bradwell Blitz ===
When the Second World War broke out in September 1939, blackout precautions were immediately put into effect, due to the dangers of night time bombing raids. New Bradwell's new electric street lights, which had only been completed two weeks previously, were switched off and not used again for six years. Bradwell's Blitz consisted of two bombs on Sunday 20 October 1940. First, two flares were dropped at the end of Bridge Street, landing on the allotments, now the school playing fields. An unconfirmed theory surmises that the bombs may have been aimed at the Wolverton railway works, then engaged in war work. Then the two bombs were dropped on the western end of the high street, the first landing on the road outside "the Laurels", creating a 30 feet (9 m) crater, the second at the end of the high street, demolishing numbers 71, 73 and 75, killing five people and injuring 20 more. The "Bradwell Blitz" was one of the more dramatic events in this part of North Buckinghamshire. (The activities at Bletchley Park a few miles south were top secret. Nevertheless, Old Bletchley was hit by four bombs – one of which hit the Park's main gate without exploding). The Bradwell Blitz was so-called because it happened during the Blitz, the fourth and last phase of the Battle of Britain.

== Civil parish ==
The civil parish of New Bradwell was created in 1919 from part of the Bradwell parish, and formed part of the Wolverton Urban District urban district (with the rest of the Bradwell parish remaining in Newport Pagnell Rural District). The parish continued to exist as part of Wolverton UD until 1934, when it was absorbed into Wolverton CP. It was re-established in 2001 as part of a general parishing of all the unparished areas of Milton Keynes.

The parish is bounded to the north by the Great Ouse, to the west by V6 Grafton Street, to the south by the route of the former Wolverton/Newport Pagnell railway line (now a redway) and to the east by a short stretch of the Grand Union Canal.

At the 2021 census, the population of the parish was 3,509, compared with 3,109 i 2011 and 2,990 in 2001.

== Sport and leisure ==
New Bradwell has a Non-League football team New Bradwell St Peter F.C. who play at The Recreation Ground.

It also has two cricket teams.

New Bradwell is known in Milton Keynes for its silver band. The band has been in existence for over 100 years and is famous locally for waking the residents of New Bradwell on Christmas morning, playing carols in the street.

== Primary school ==
New Bradwell School is situated on Bounty Street and is just to the side of Grafton Street and Spencer Street, an off-road street with some historic houses named 'Railway Cottages'.

== See also ==
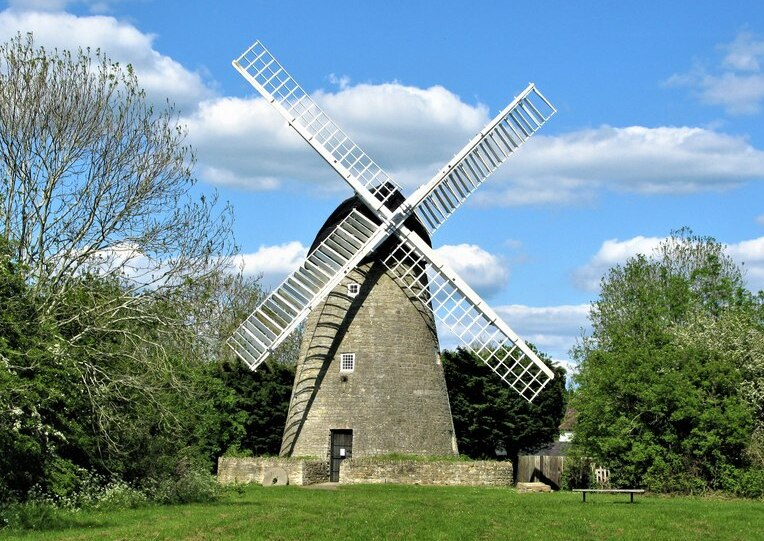
The windmill in nearby Bradville

- Bradwell Abbey
- Bradwell
- Bradville
