= Wayland Tunley =

British architect

- Born: 13 March 1937
- Died: 30 October 2012 (aged 75)
- Occupation: Architect
- Known for: Projects in Milton Keynes
- Notable work: Neath Hill; Coffridge Close, Stony Stratford
- Spouse: Kiera
- Children: Justin and Hilary

Wayland Tunley (1937–2012) was a British architect, known for his designs for several developments in Milton Keynes for Milton Keynes Development Corporation.

== Career ==
Tunley became a chartered architect and member of the Royal Institute of British Architects in 1962.

Tunley joined Milton Keynes Development Corporation in 1972 and worked on several projects in the northern side including Neath Hill, Coffridge Close in Stony Stratford and the Agora in Wolverton.

After leaving the development corporation, he formed a new practice with MKDC colleague Trevor Denton in the early 1980s. In 1993 Tunley formed the architecture practice Wayland Tunley & Associates Limited.

== Personal life ==
Tunley was born in the Sudan and schooled at Comboni College in Khartoum from 1947.

Tunley died at University Hospital Coventry on 30 October 2012, following an accident at an airfield in Hinton-in-the-Hedges.

He is survived by his wife Kiera, and two children: Justin and Hilary. He was cremated at Crownhill Crematorium in Milton Keynes on 19 November 2012.
