= Little Linford Wood =

Nature reserve in Buckinghamshire, England

Coordinates: 52.102°N 0.7831°W

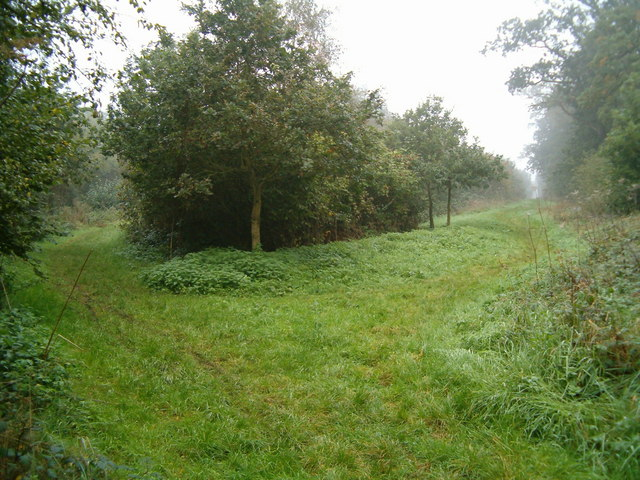
Divergent paths at Little Linford Wood

Little Linford Wood is a 42.5-hectare (105-acre) nature reserve in Little Linford in the City of Milton Keynes, Buckinghamshire, England. It is managed by the Berkshire, Buckinghamshire and Oxfordshire Wildlife Trust.

Much of the woodland is young as it was felled in 1980, shortly before the Trust took over the site, but there are also areas of mature oak and ash. In 1998 dormice were introduced, and they live high up in the canopy. Other mammals include stoats and badgers, and there are birds such as great spotted woodpeckers, kestrels and buzzards. Grassy rides provide a habitat for butterflies.

The wood is crossed by footpaths from Little Linford, Tathall End and Haversham.
