= List of King George V Playing Fields in Buckinghamshire =

Buckinghamshire
Location	Formal name	Local name (if any)	National Grid Reference	Dates		External links
Location	Formal name	Local name (if any)	National Grid Reference	Purchase	Opening	External links
Amersham	King George's Field		SU968983	1939		
Bradwell	King George's Field	Recreation Ground	SP831398	1938		
Fulmer	King George's Field		SU996850	1939		
Hughenden	King George's Field		SU863965	1950		
Princes Risborough	King George's Field	Recreation Ground	SP807038	1938		
