= A422 road =

Road in England

A422

Route information
- Length: 83 mi (134 km)

Major junctions
- East end: A428 near Bromham; 52.14073°N 0.54537°W
- A428 A509; A5 A508 A413; A43 M40 A361; A46; A44
- West end: A44 near Broughton Hackett; 52.18351°N 2.13821°W

Location
- Country: United Kingdom
- Primary destinations: Bedford; Milton Keynes; Banbury; Stratford upon Avon; Worcester

Road network
- Roads in the United Kingdom; Motorways; A and B road zones
← A421	→ A423

The A422 is an "A" road for east–west journeys in south central England, connecting the county towns of Bedford and Worcester by way of Milton Keynes, Buckingham, Brackley, Banbury and Stratford-upon-Avon. For most of its length, it is a narrow single carriageway.

== Route (east to west) ==
The eastern end of the road is at Bromham on the outskirts of Bedford, where it branches off the A428. Its route then crosses into the City of Milton Keynes. It briefly merges with the A509 to bypass Newport Pagnell. Passing over the M1, it crosses through the northern part of the Milton Keynes urban area as a dual carriageway, known locally additionally as the H3 Monks Way grid road.

Upon meeting the A5 in Milton Keynes, the A422 multiplexes northbound with it for 3 miles (4.8 km) as far as Old Stratford in Northamptonshire where it regains its identity (and single carriageway status). Resuming its east–west orientation, it bypasses Deanshanger, goes through the centre of Buckingham, around Brackley, on into Oxfordshire just before crossing the M40 at Junction 11 and then into Banbury. From the A422/B4525 roundabout, on the western edge of Middleton Cheney (east of Junction 11), the road is dualled until it meets the A423 and resumes as a single carriageway. From there to Stratford-upon-Avon, it is a minor road crossing into Warwickshire at the Battle of Edgehill site, where it descends steeply down the Sunrising Hill escarpment and then across the Fosse Way.

From the western side of Stratford-upon-Avon, the road multiplexes with the A46 until its junction with the A435 trunk road at Oversley on the outskirts of the historic market town of Alcester. At that roundabout junction, the A422 heads briefly north to cross the River Arrow before heading west into the village of Arrow. In the village the road takes a right hand turn at the old Toll House, heading for the border with Worcestershire and passing through the village of Inkberrow, said to be the village that was the inspiration for Ambridge, (the setting for the long-running BBC radio series The Archers).

The last section to Worcester is narrow and winding until it terminates at the A44 just south of M5 junction 6.

The road is 83 miles (134 km) long.
