= Little Linford =

Village in Buckinghamshire, England

Coordinates: 52.091°N 0.772°W

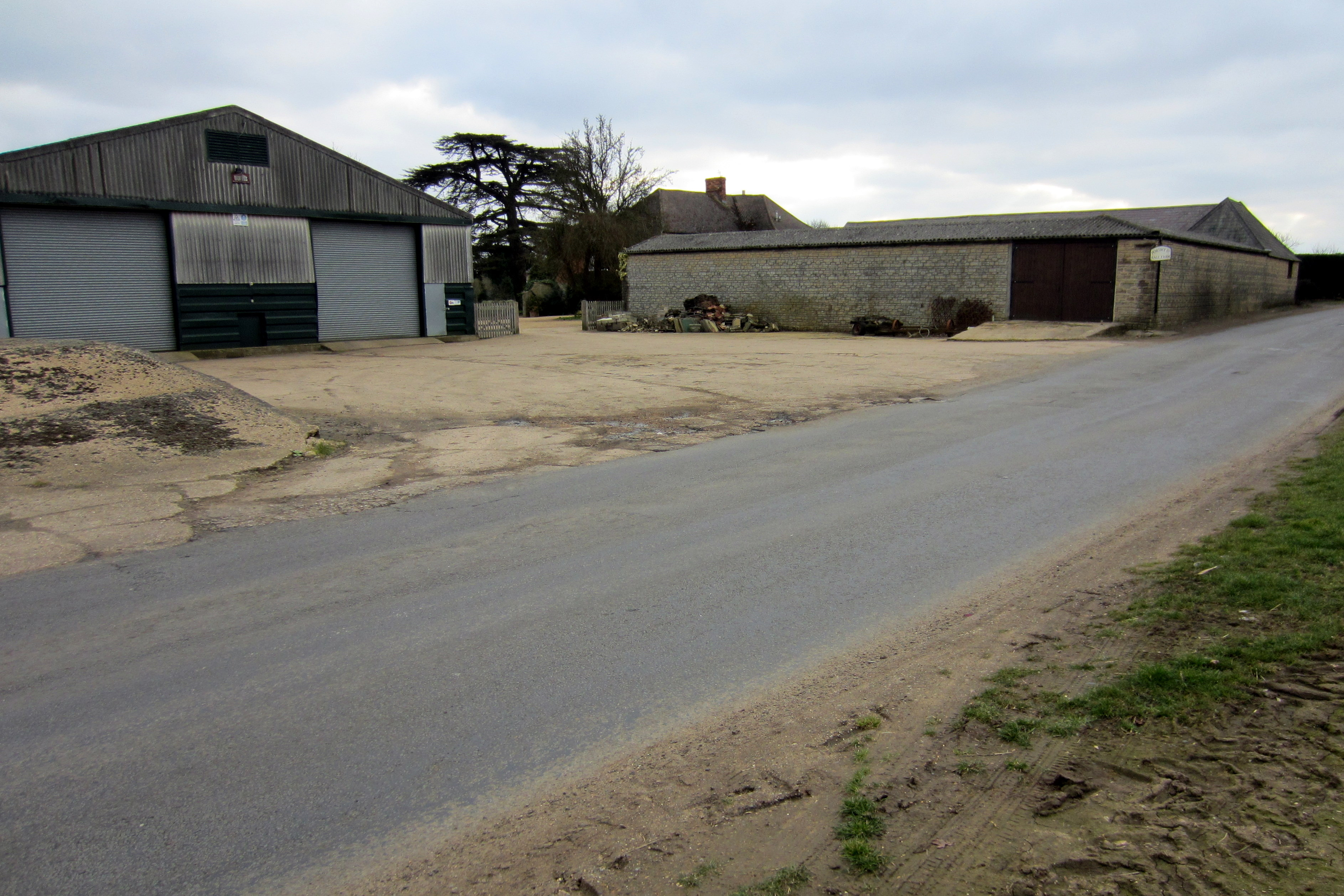

- Location within Buckinghamshire
- Interactive map of Little Linford
- OS grid reference: SP842443
- Civil parish: Haversham-cum-Little Linford
- Unitary authority: Milton Keynes
- Ceremonial county: Buckinghamshire
- Region: South East
- Country: England
- Sovereign state: United Kingdom
- Post town: MILTON KEYNES
- Postcode district: MK19
- Dialling code: 01908
- Police: Thames Valley
- Fire: Buckinghamshire
- Ambulance: South Central
- UK Parliament: Milton Keynes North

Little Linford is a village in the civil parish of Haversham-cum-Little Linford, in the City of Milton Keynes, Buckinghamshire, England. Located near the M1 motorway, the village is about 2 miles (3.2 km) north-west of Newport Pagnell and 3.5 miles (5.6 km) north of Central Milton Keynes. The village is separated from its neighbour and namesake Great Linford (and the rest of the Milton Keynes urban area) by the floodplain of the River Great Ouse.

'Linford' is an Old English word that means 'ford where maple trees grow'. In the Domesday Book of 1086 it was recorded as Linforde.

Little Linford was initially a hamlet in the manor of Linford. The manor straddled the Great Ouse. The larger part of the manor south of the river became the parish of Great Linford. The part of the manor north of the river became known as Little Linford, and formed part of the ancient parish of Newport Pagnell. A chapel of ease dedicated to St Leonard and St Andrew was built to serve Little Linford, with the oldest part of the current building dating back to the 13th century. Little Linford was subsequently made a separate parish from Newport Pagnell in 1735.

In 1934, the parish of Little Linford was merged with the neighbouring parish of Haversham to become a new civil parish called Haversham-cum-Little Linford. At the 1931 census (the last before the abolition of the parish), Little Linford had a population of 45.

== Little Linford Wood ==
Little Linford Wood is owned by Berkshire, Buckinghamshire and Oxfordshire Wildlife Trust. Today it is one of the best habitats for dormice, which were transferred to Little Linford Wood from Kent when the Channel Tunnel rail link was being constructed.
