= A509 road =

Road in England

A509

Major junctions
- North end: Kettering; 52.3880°N 0.7147°W
- A14 (J9); A45 A428 A422; M1 (J14) A4146; A5
- South end: Milton Keynes; 52.0374°N 0.7819°W

Location
- Country: United Kingdom
- Primary destinations: Kettering, Wellingborough, Milton Keynes

Road network
- Roads in the United Kingdom; Motorways; A and B road zones

The A509 is a short A-class road (around 30 miles (50 km) long) for north–south journeys in south central England, forming the route from Kettering in Northamptonshire to the A5 in Milton Keynes, via M1 junction 14.

From north to south, the road begins at Wicksteed Park in the outskirts of Kettering. It then crosses the A14 (where it becomes a primary route) and goes through Isham and Great Harrowden. After this it goes on to form the Wellingborough western bypass before leaving Northamptonshire to cross into the City of Milton Keynes (and Buckinghamshire). From there, it crosses the A428 at a roundabout and cuts through the centre of Olney. South of Olney the road passes Emberton, meeting the A422 just north-east of Newport Pagnell, where the routes multiplex to form the Newport Pagnell eastern bypass. South of Newport Pagnell, the routes diverge at a roundabout with the A509 turning south and the A422 continuing westbound. Here the A509 is a single carriageway once more until it crosses the M1 at junction 14, where it enters the Milton Keynes urban area. Continuing westwards from here, the road once more becomes a dual carriageway, running for a further 4 miles (6.4 km) past the edge of Central Milton Keynes (the central business district of the city), to link up finally with the A5. Through Milton Keynes, the road is additionally known as the grid road H5 Portway.

== Proposed Isham bypass ==
The A509 Isham Bypass is a proposal by North Northamptonshire Council to improve transport links between Kettering and Wellingborough, to improve access from Wellingborough to the A14, and to remove 'through traffic' from Isham village.

A bid for Major Road Network funding was submitted to the Department for Transport (DfT)in March 2020, with a Strategic Outline Business Case in December 2020. In October 2021, £1.9 million of funding from the DfT was secured towards the next stages of developing the proposals for the bypass. A planning application for the bypass was due to be submitted in July 2023.
