= Shared-use path =

Pathway for pedestrians and cyclists

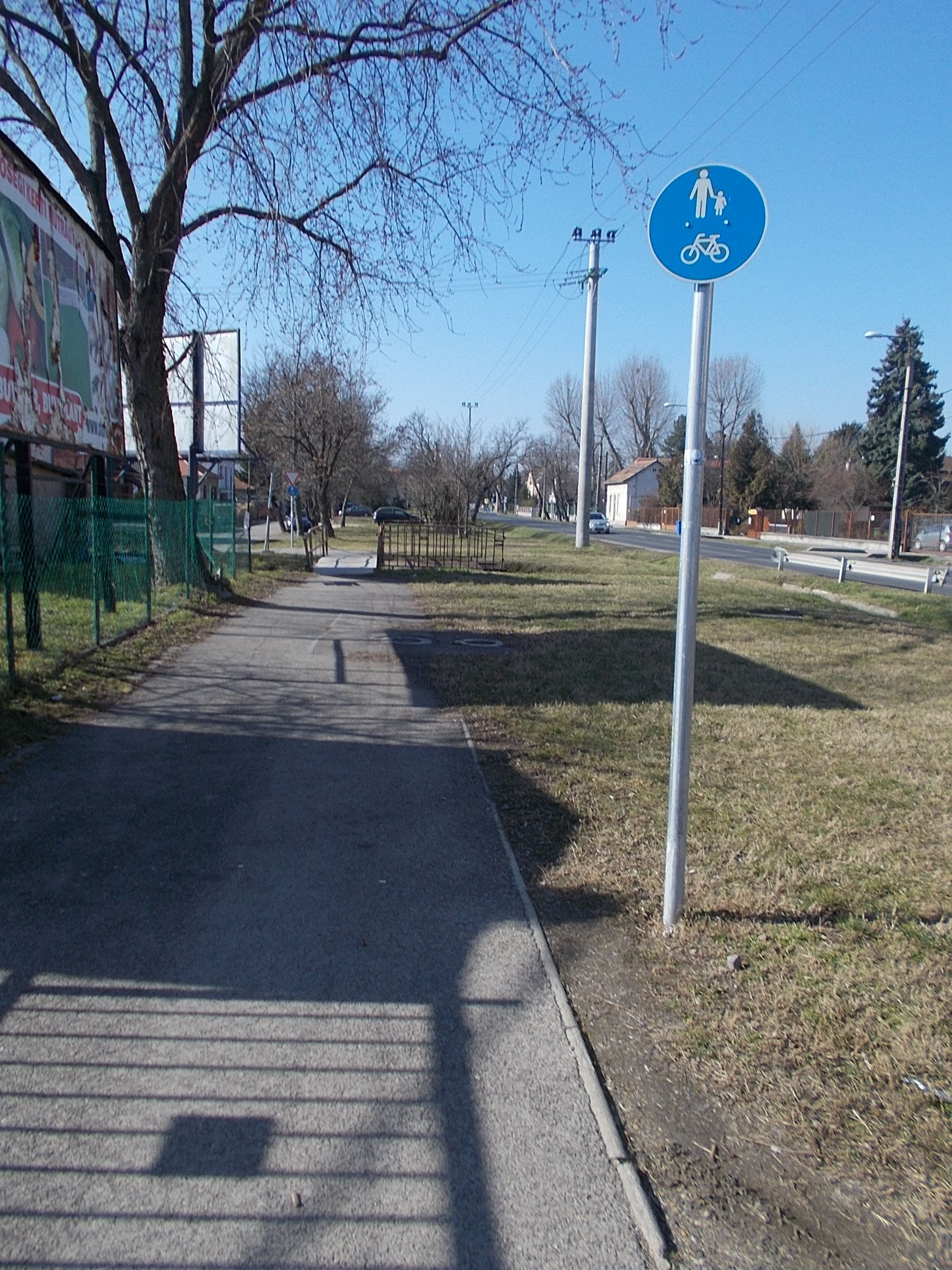
A shared-use path in Budapest, with a typical European shared-use sign

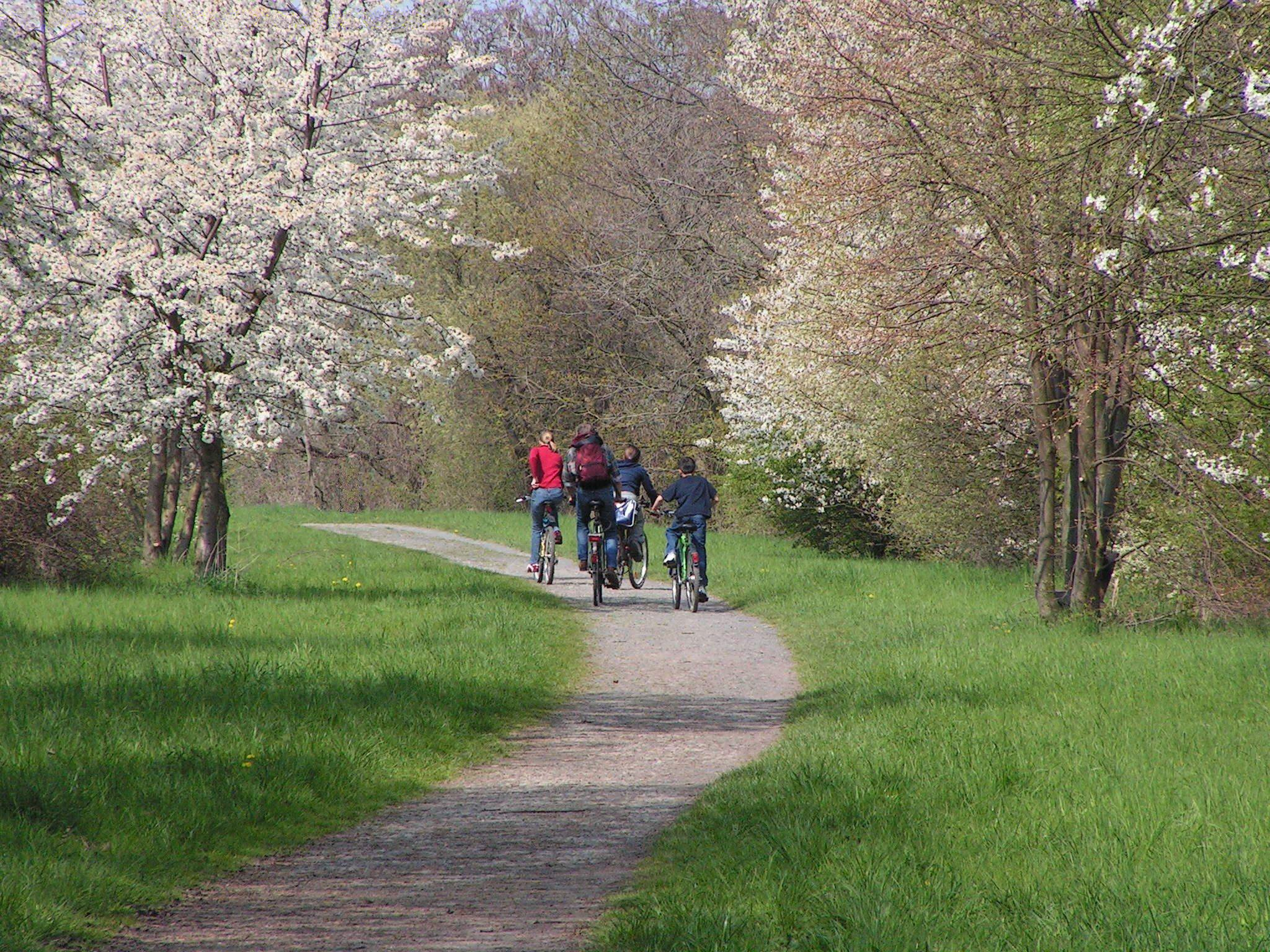
Cyclists are often permitted to use rail trails and bridleways, such as this rail trail in Germany.

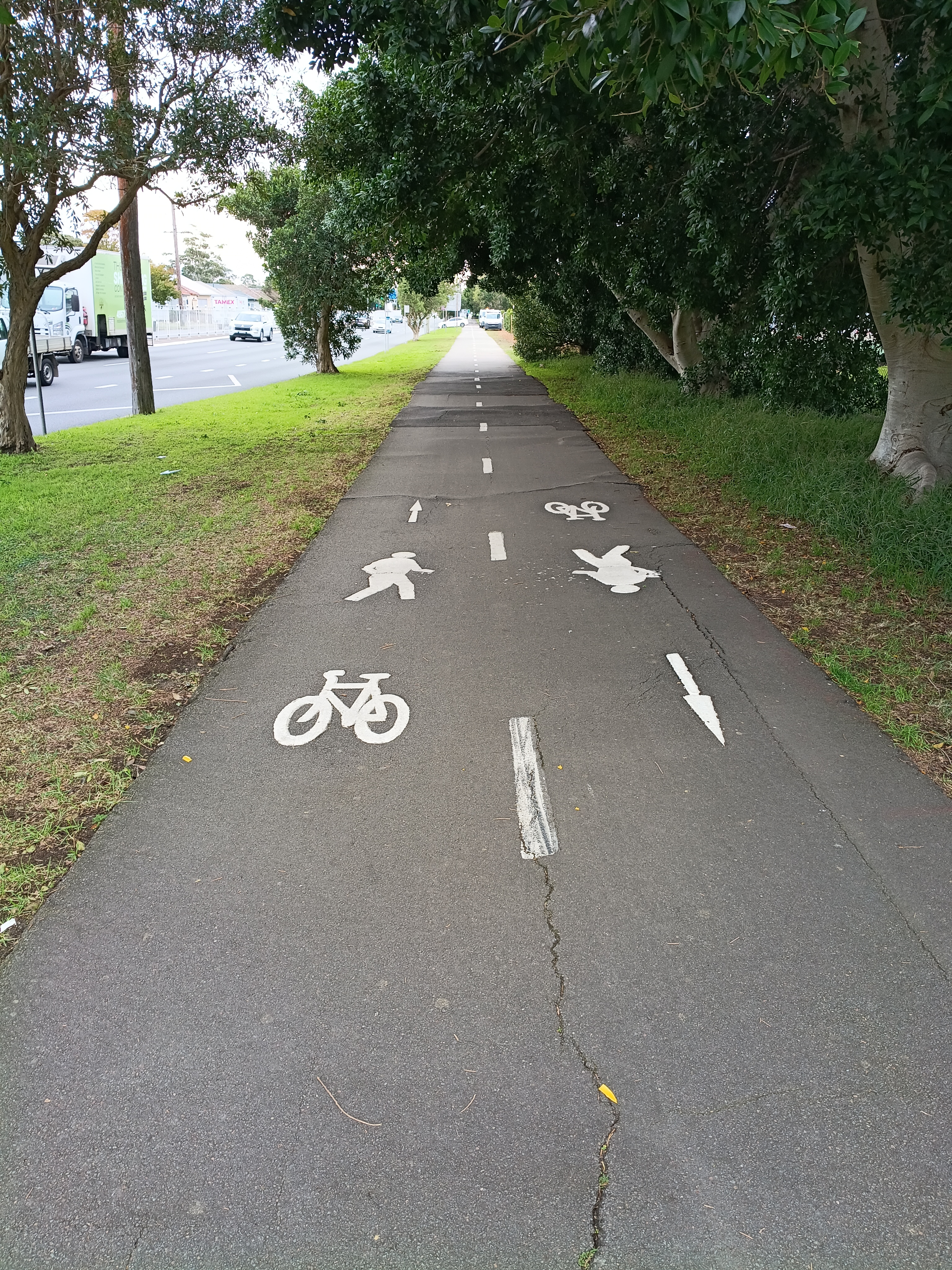
A shared-use path in Broadmeadow, Australia, separated by direction of travel.

A shared-use path, mixed-use path or multi-use pathway is a path which is "designed to accommodate the movement of pedestrians and cyclists". Examples of shared-use paths include sidewalks designated as shared-use, bridleways and rail trails. A shared-use path typically has a surface that is asphalt, concrete or firmly packed crushed aggregate. Shared-use paths differ from cycle tracks and cycle paths in that they are designed to accommodate pedestrians, even if the primary anticipated users are cyclists.

The path may also permit other users such as inline skating. Contrastingly, motorcycles and mopeds are normally prohibited. Shared-use paths sometimes provide different lanes for users who travel at different speeds to prevent conflicts between user groups on high-use trails. In some cases, paths are divided into lanes shared by pedestrians and cyclists traveling in the same direction. Shared-use paths are criticised for creating conflict between different users. The UK's Department for Transport deprecates this kind of route in denser urban environments.

== Types ==
=== Bridleways ===
In the UK, cyclists are legally permitted to cycle on bridleways (paths open to horse riders), but not on public footpaths. Therefore, bridleways are, in effect, a form of shared-use path.

=== Segregated paths ===
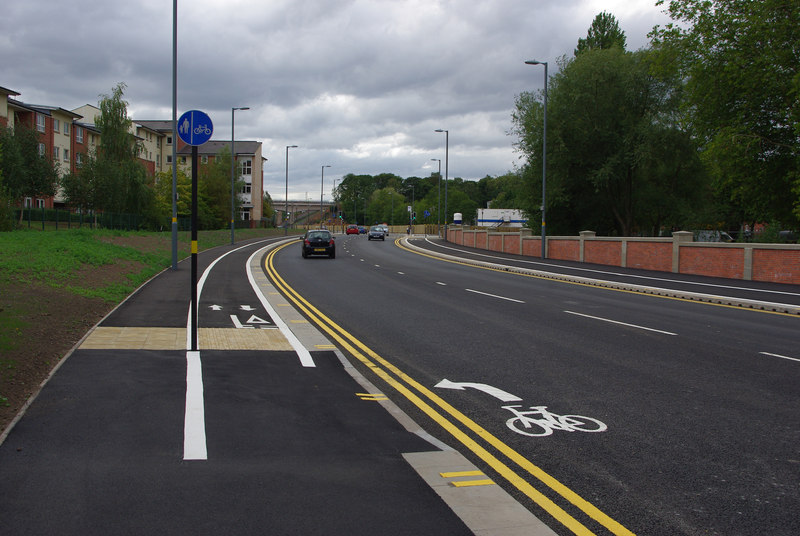
A segregated path in Birmingham, England. Note the tactile pavings to delineate the pedestrian and cyclist sections of the path.

On segregated or divided paths, the path is split into a section for pedestrians and a section for cyclists. This may be achieved with a painted line or a different surface. It may also be delineated with tactile paving for blind and visually impaired pedestrians.

Research by the UK Department for Transport found that cyclists and pedestrians prefer wider non-segregated paths to more narrow segregated paths (e.g. a 3 m wide shared path, compared with a 3 m path split into 1.5 m sections).

== Benefits ==
The principal benefit of a shared-use path is saving space. This may be important in environmentally-sensitive areas or on narrow streets, where a full cycle track may not be feasible.

== Issues ==
Shared use paths are criticised for creating conflict between pedestrians and cyclists and creating complaints from pedestrians and speed. Therefore, the paths do not properly take into account the different needs of different road users. For example a study by the Institute for Chartered Engineers found that users of shared use paths were confused about the nature of the path and who has priority on them.

Pedestrians are sometimes unsure how to behave on shared-use paths. The question arises whether the path is to be treated as a road (therefore pedestrians should face oncoming traffic), or a path (and therefore pedestrians may walk wherever they choose).

Shared-use paths alongside the highway often look like sidewalks to motorists. Therefore, at side roads, in jurisdictions where pedestrians do not have priority at side roads, the priority situation at side roads on shared-use paths can be confusing and often cyclists are required to give way to turning motorists.

== By country ==
=== United Kingdom ===
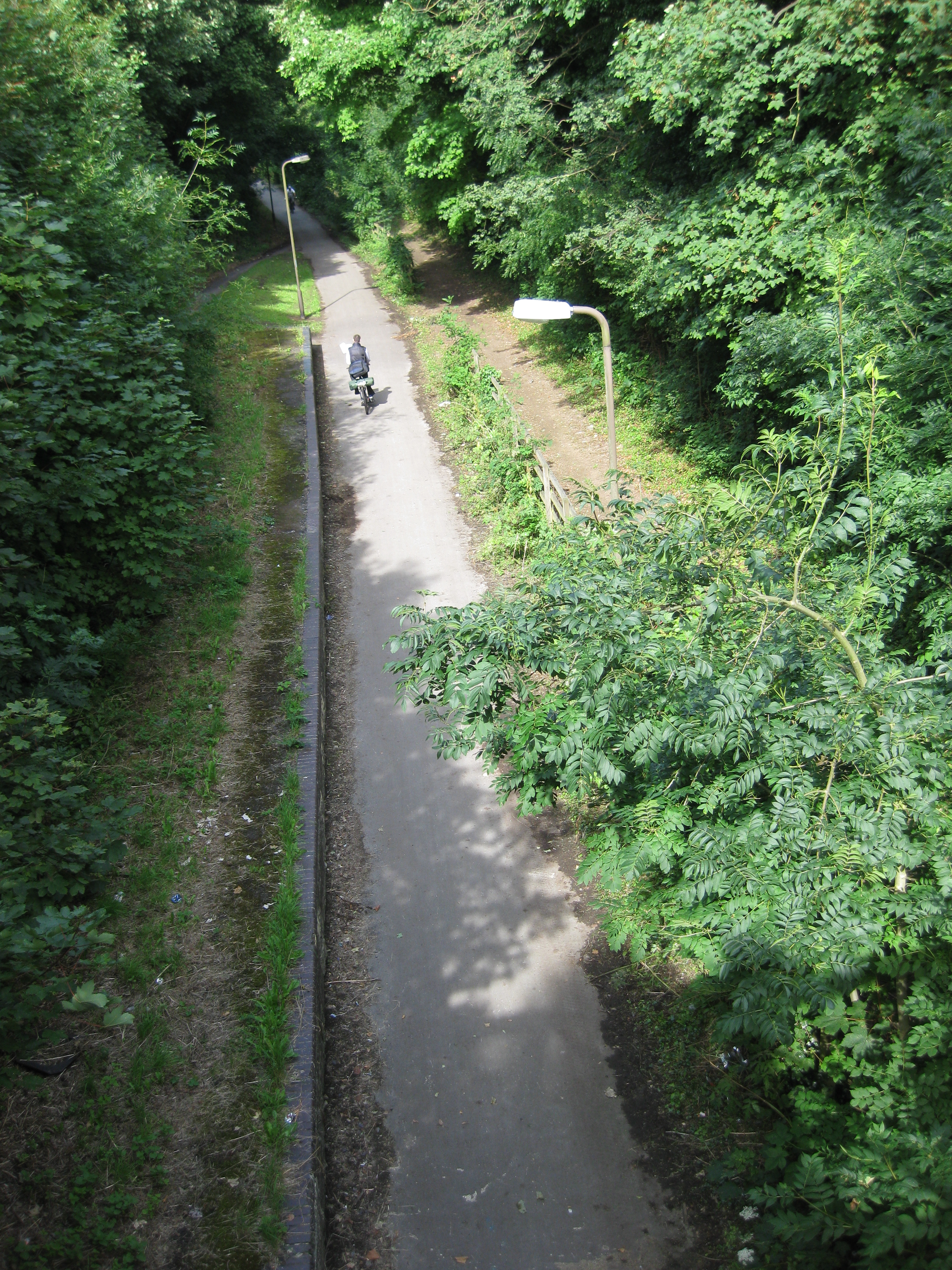
Part of the Milton Keynes redway system runs along the disused track bed of the former Wolverton to Newport Pagnell Line, now a rail trail.

Before the January 2022 revision, the Highway Code gave no advice to pedestrians on how to share space with cyclists; there was also little guidance given to cyclists. (The 2023 edition covers both aspects. The UK Department for Transport advises local authorities that cyclists and pedestrians should not be expected to share space on or alongside city streets. Sustrans gives advice for cyclists, walkers and runners using shared-use paths on the National Cycle Network.

The Milton Keynes redway system is an example of a city-wide network of shared-use paths. The network consists of over 200 miles (320 km) of shared-use paths that avoid the city's busy and fast grid roads (which run between neighbourhoods rather than through them).

=== United States ===
In the US, the 1999 AASHTO Guide for the Development of Bicycle Facilities defines a shared-use path as being physically separated from motor vehicular traffic with an open space or barrier.

== See also ==
- Bike lane – Road traffic lane for cyclists
- Cycling infrastructure
- Greenway (landscape)
- List of rail trails
- Rail trail
- Shared-use trail section in Trail page
- Sidewalk cycling, riding bicycles on sidewalks where pedestrians usually have priority
