= Great Linford =

Civil parish in Milton Keynes, England

Coordinates: 52.0680°N 0.7637°W

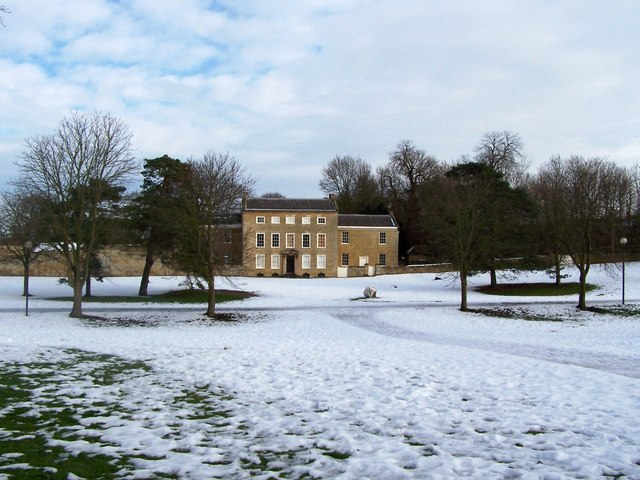
- Great Linford Manor

- Location within Buckinghamshire
- Interactive map of Great Linford
- Population: 20,716 (2021 census)
- OS grid reference: SP854414
- Civil parish: Great Linford
- District: City of Milton Keynes
- Unitary authority: Milton Keynes City Council
- Ceremonial county: Buckinghamshire
- Region: South East
- Country: England
- Sovereign state: United Kingdom
- Post town: MILTON KEYNES
- Postcode district: MK14
- Dialling code: 01908
- Police: Thames Valley
- Fire: Buckinghamshire
- Ambulance: South Central
- UK Parliament: Milton Keynes North

Great Linford is a historic village, district and wider civil parish in the north of Milton Keynes, England, between Wolverton and Newport Pagnell, and roughly 2 miles (3.2 km) north of Central Milton Keynes.

== Great Linford village ==
Great Linford was one of the North Buckinghamshire villages incorporated into Milton Keynes at its designation in 1967.

=== History ===
The origin of the name Linford is not recorded. (Note: The Great Linford History Society conjectures that the name may originate from the Old English hlin (a tree, possibly a maple); lind, a lime tree (linden tree); or linen; combined with 'ford' (over the Great Ouse that separates Great Linford from Little Linford to the north). The Society emphasises that this etymology is purely speculative.) The first reference to Linford occurs in 944, when "King Edmund gave to his thegn Aelfheah, land at Linforda with liberty to leave it to whom he wished"; it appears in the Domesday Book as Linforda. Archaeological investigations at the parish church indicate that the site was a Saxon settlement in the seventh century.

In the early sixteenth century, the rector of this parish Dr Richard Napier was widely known as a medical practitioner, astrologer and curer of souls. He was referred to by many in the upper classes, including the Earl of Sunderland who lived under his care for some time in 1629.

Great Linford Manor was originally built on the hill where the South Pavilion now stands. It was the home of Sir Richard Napier from 1633 to 1676. The manor was the country seat of Sir William Prichard (or Pritchard) in the later part of the seventeenth century, who was Lord Mayor of London, a merchant and slave trader. He bought the Manor of Great Linford in 1682, demolished the original manor house and built the present house below it. In 1702, he founded the group of almshouses and school-house beside the church, which are still there today.

The village grew in importance following construction in 1800 of the Grand Junction Canal and associated wharf to serve Newport Pagnell; in 1817 an arm, the Newport Pagnell Canal, was built out from here but was unsuccessful and closed in 1867. For a hundred years (1867 to 1967) Great Linford was served by Great Linford railway station on the Wolverton to Newport Pagnell branch line.

=== Education ===
St. Andrews C. of E. Infant School, on the High Street, was founded in 1901. As part of the development of Milton Keynes, a new primary and middle school was opened in 1977, originally known as Great Linford County Combined School, and more recently as Great Linford Primary School.

=== Parish church ===
The parish church of Saint Andrew is a Grade II* listed building, dating from about 1250. By 1708, the church had become dilapidated and Prichard's widow, Sarah, paid for it to be restored; the church was restored again in 1884–5.

=== Other ===
Great Linford has two pubs: The Nag's Head, on the High Street and The Black Horse at the edge of Great Linford on Wolverton Road, by the Grand Union Canal. There is a new Memorial Hall and a Community Hall off Marsh Drive behind the manor house.

Linford Manor is now owned by Pete Winkelman who was first chairman of Milton Keynes Dons F.C. The former stables and associated gate houses are now an Arts Centre. As of 2022, the former almshouses are not in use but in February 2022, Milton Keynes Council transferred them into the care of the Parks Trust and they are scheduled to be restored.

== Civil parish ==
In addition to Great Linford district itself (with the historic village at its core), the civil parish also includes the districts of Bolbeck Park/Giffard Park, Blakelands, Neath Hill, Pennyland, Tongwell, Conniburrow, Downs Barn, Downhead Park and Redhouse Park.

The parish is bounded to the north by Newport Road, to the west by the B4034/V8 Marlborough Street (as far as H4 Dansteed Way), then along Dansteed Way as far as V7 Saxon Street, south along Saxon Street as far as the A509/H5 Portway, then east along Portway to the M1, then north along the motorway until it reaches Newport Road again. The Grand Union Canal bisects the parish.

The parish increased in population from 263 in the 1971 census to 11,882 in the 1981 census, an increase of some 4,400%. At the 2011 census, the population had reached 19,350, and 20,718 at the 2021 census.

=== Listed buildings and structures ===
The parish has four Grade II* listed buildings (the parish church, the Almshouses, the Manor House, and the Pavilions), a further 20 Grade II listings, and one scheduled monument (two small brick kilns).

=== Images of Great Linford CP ===
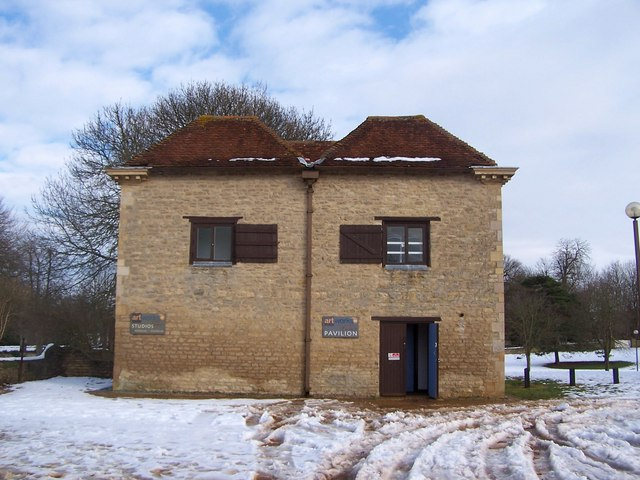
The Pavilions at Great Linford Arts Centre

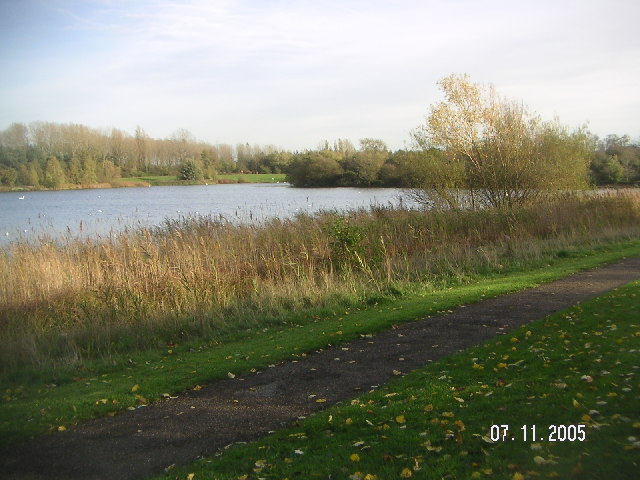
Tongwell Lake, a balancing lake, viewed in a south-easterly direction

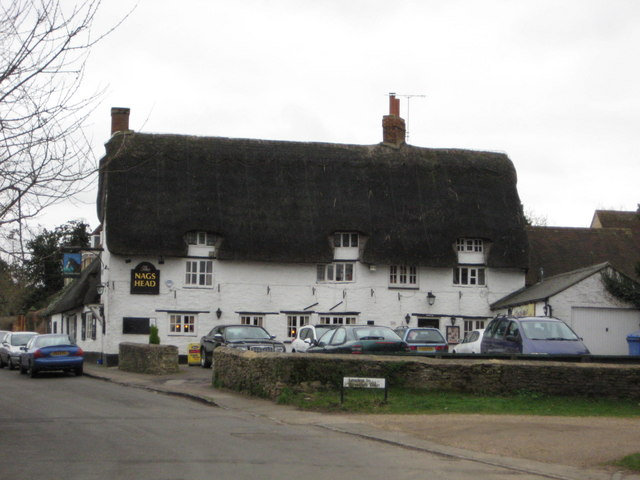
The Nags Head, Great Linford village

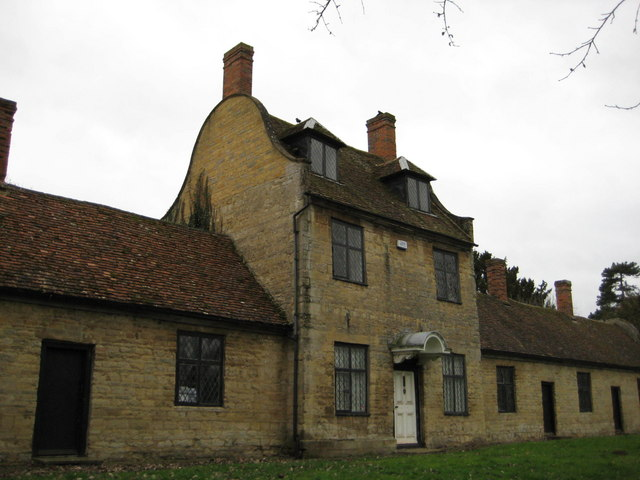
Almshouses at Great Linford

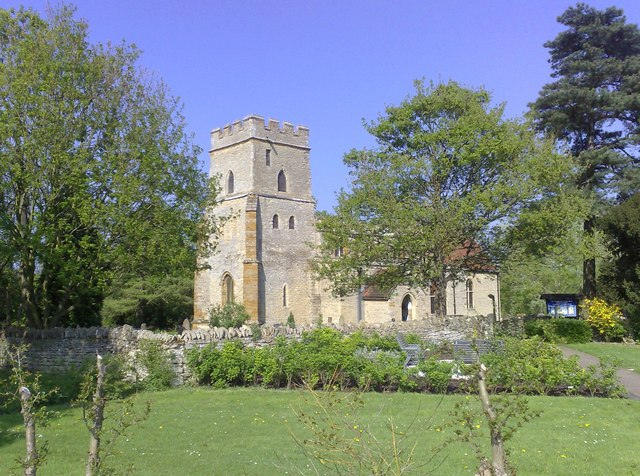
St Andrew's Church

== See also ==
- Little Linford in the adjoining parish of Haversham-cum-Little Linford.
- Linford Wood in the adjoining Stantonbury parish.
