= Wolverton–Newport Pagnell line =

Railway branch line in Buckinghamshire, England

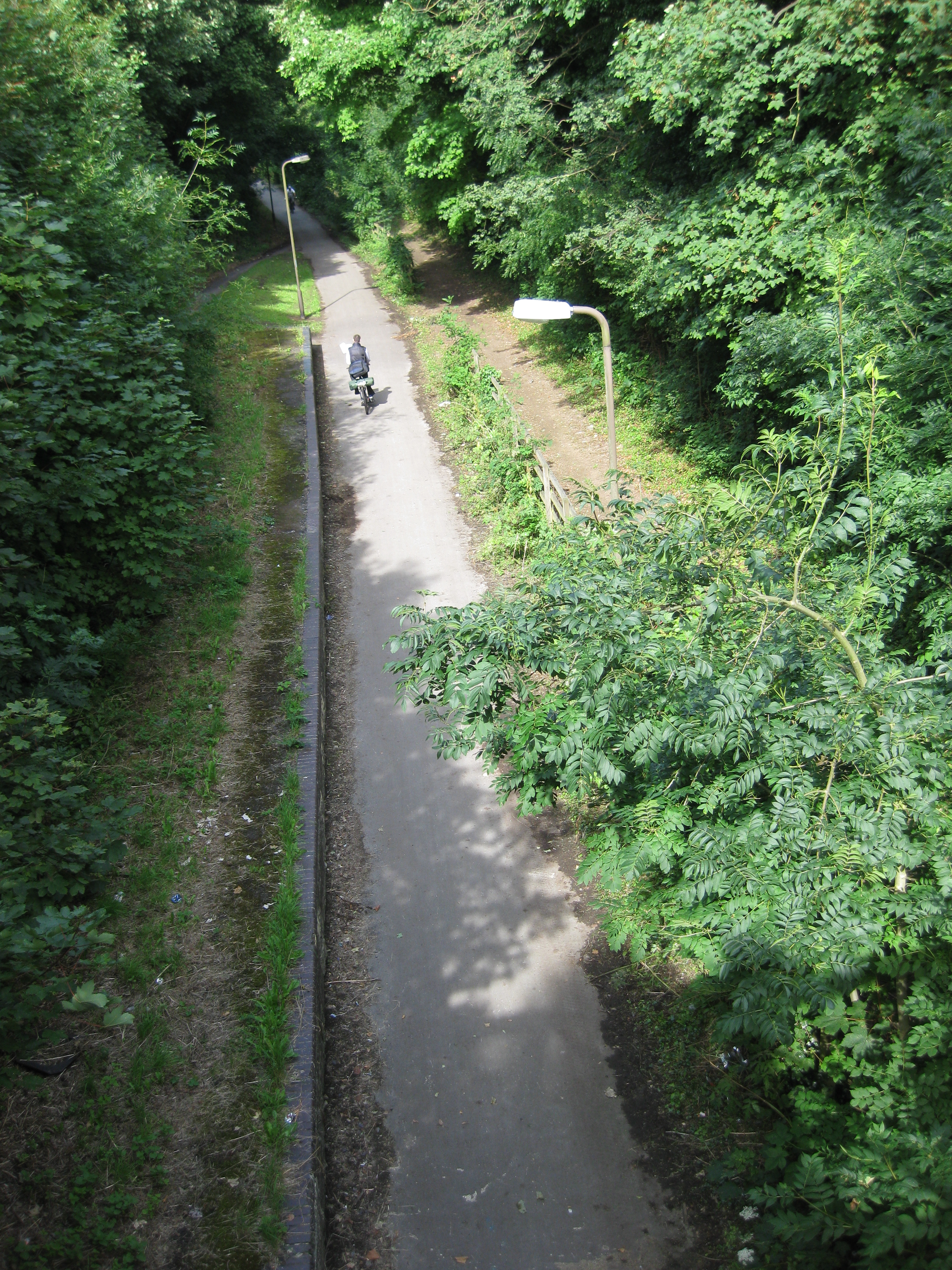
- Platform at the former Bradwell station. The trackbed is now a shared use path

Overview
- Locale: England
- Dates of operation: 1866–1967
- Successor: Abandoned

Technical
- Track gauge: 1,435 mm (4 ft 8 1/2 in)
- Length: 4 miles (6.4 km)

The Wolverton–Newport Pagnell line was a railway branch line in Buckinghamshire, United Kingdom running from Wolverton on the London and North Western Railway (LNWR) (today's West Coast Main Line) to Newport Pagnell. The line fully opened to passengers in 1867. An extension to Olney was planned in 1865, but this scheme was abandoned after partial construction. Earthworks along the route of the extension still exist in Bury Field (Newport Pagnell), and plaques exist detailing the history of the failed project.

Competition from road traffic starting in the early twentieth century put pressure on the railway, and it was later a victim of the Beeching cuts. The line was seen as unprofitable, and it closed to passengers in 1964, and to goods traffic in 1967. Part of the trackbed today provides a section of the Milton Keynes redway system, a network of shared paths that serves the Milton Keynes urban area.

== Background ==
The Newport Pagnell Canal had opened in 1817 between the Grand Junction Canal at Great Linford and Newport Pagnell. The canal carried a reasonable level of traffic but, in 1845, the LNWR attempted to buy the canal to use its route as a potential railway line. The offer was refused for two decades, until 1862, when the LNWR was able to purchase the canal for £9000. The canal closed in 1864. Despite this, the railway when built did not run on the line of the old canal.

Two earlier proposals had been made in 1845 and 1846 for a railway serving Newport Pagnell: both schemes failed to attract sufficient capital.

== Construction and operation ==
Newport Pagnell Railway Act 1863
- Act of Parliament
- Parliament of the United Kingdom
- Long title: An Act to incorporate a Company for making a Railway from the London and North-western Railway to Newport Pagnell, with Powers to purchase the Newport Pagnell Canal.
- Citation: 26 & 27 Vict. c. cx

Dates
- Royal assent: 29 June 1863

Text of statute as originally enacted

Permission to build the 4-mile (6.4 km) long single line branch railway was obtained on 16 June 1863 in the Newport Pagnell Railway Act 1863 (26 & 27 Vict. c. cx). The line opened for goods in 1866, with passenger services commencing on 2 September 1867. The one engine that worked the single track branch was later nicknamed Newport Nobby.

Newport Pagnell Railway (Extension to Olney) Act 1865
- Act of Parliament
- Parliament of the United Kingdom
- Long title: An Act to authorize the Newport Pagnell Railway Company to extend their Railway to Olney in the County of Bucks.
- Citation: 28 & 29 Vict. c. lvi

Dates
- Royal assent: 2 June 1865

Newport Pagnell Railway (Extension) Act 1866
- Act of Parliament
- Parliament of the United Kingdom
- Long title: An Act to authorize the Newport Pagnell Railway Company to extend their Railway to the Northampton and Peterborough Line of the London and North-western Railway Company, and to the authorized Bedford and Northampton Railway; and for other Purposes.
- Citation: 29 & 30 Vict. c. cccliv

Dates
- Royal assent: 10 August 1866

Newport Pagnell Railway (Transfer and Dissolution) Act 1875
- Act of Parliament
- Parliament of the United Kingdom
- Long title: An Act to authorise the Newport Pagnell Railway Company to abandon portions of their Undertaking, and to transfer the remainder thereof to the London and North-western Railway Company; and for other purposes.
- Citation: 38 & 39 Vict. c. cvi

Dates
- Royal assent: 29 June 1875

Text of statute as originally enacted

In the Newport Pagnell Railway (Extension to Olney) Act 1865 (28 & 29 Vict. c. lvi), powers were granted to extend the line from Newport Pagnell to Olney and then in the Newport Pagnell Railway (Extension) Act 1866 (29 & 30 Vict. c. cccliv) on to meet the Northampton and Peterborough Railway at Wellingborough. Construction was underway, and a bridge had been completed when the extension was abandoned in 1871. The line was officially absorbed by the LNWR by the Newport Pagnell Railway (Transfer and Dissolution) Act 1875 (38 & 39 Vict. c. cvi).

Olney was later served by a station on the Midland Railway's Bedford–Northampton line from 1872: that line closed in 1962.

In 1900 a spur connecting the branch to the up slow line of the West Coast Main Line was constructed. The water supply for locomotives at Wolverton was insufficient, so a water column was built at the intermediate station in Bradwell. Water came from the town's own source, with many houses losing their supply. On Mondays, housewives were known to shake their fists at engine drivers when their weekly wash was interrupted. Eventually drivers were forbidden from taking water from Bradwell on Mondays.

In 1898, the first motor bus service in Buckinghamshire began running between Newport Pagnell and Olney, followed by numerous other routes, which took traffic away from the railway line. Despite this, the LNWR considered electrification of the line in 1904, believing such a scheme would bring about considerable savings, but the idea never materialised.

== Closure ==
The branch was included in the Beeching report of 1963 which concluded that, since 30% of the railway network carried less than 1% of the total passenger traffic, much of it should be closed. The residents of Newport Pagnell resisted the closure, demanding an enquiry which took place on 7 June 1964. Despite many objections, it was determined that the line would close. The last passenger service was the 5:34 pm train from Newport Pagnell on 5 September 1964, just under a century after the line opened to passengers. The mourning of the line was so great that a bucket of water was poured over a double dressed as Richard Beeching, the man commonly associated with the closure of over 4,000 miles of the British railway network. The crowd cheered as this happened, a mark of the public's feelings about the closure.

The line was finally closed to freight traffic in 1967, after which the tracks were lifted.

== See also ==
- Wolverton and Stony Stratford Tramway
- Rail trail – Former railway trackbeds now used as recreational trails

== Sources ==
- Hadfield, Charles (1970). The Canals of the East Midlands (including part of London) Second edition. David & Charles Limited. ISBN 0-7153-4871-X.
- Henshaw, David (1994). The Great Railway Conspiracy. Hawes, North Yorkshire: Leading Edge Press and Publishing. ISBN 0-948135-48-4.
- Oppitz, Leslie, ed. (2000). Lost Railways of the Chilterns. Newbury: Countryside Books. ISBN 1-85306-643-5.
