= Milton Keynes redway system =

Shared path network in Milton Keynes, England

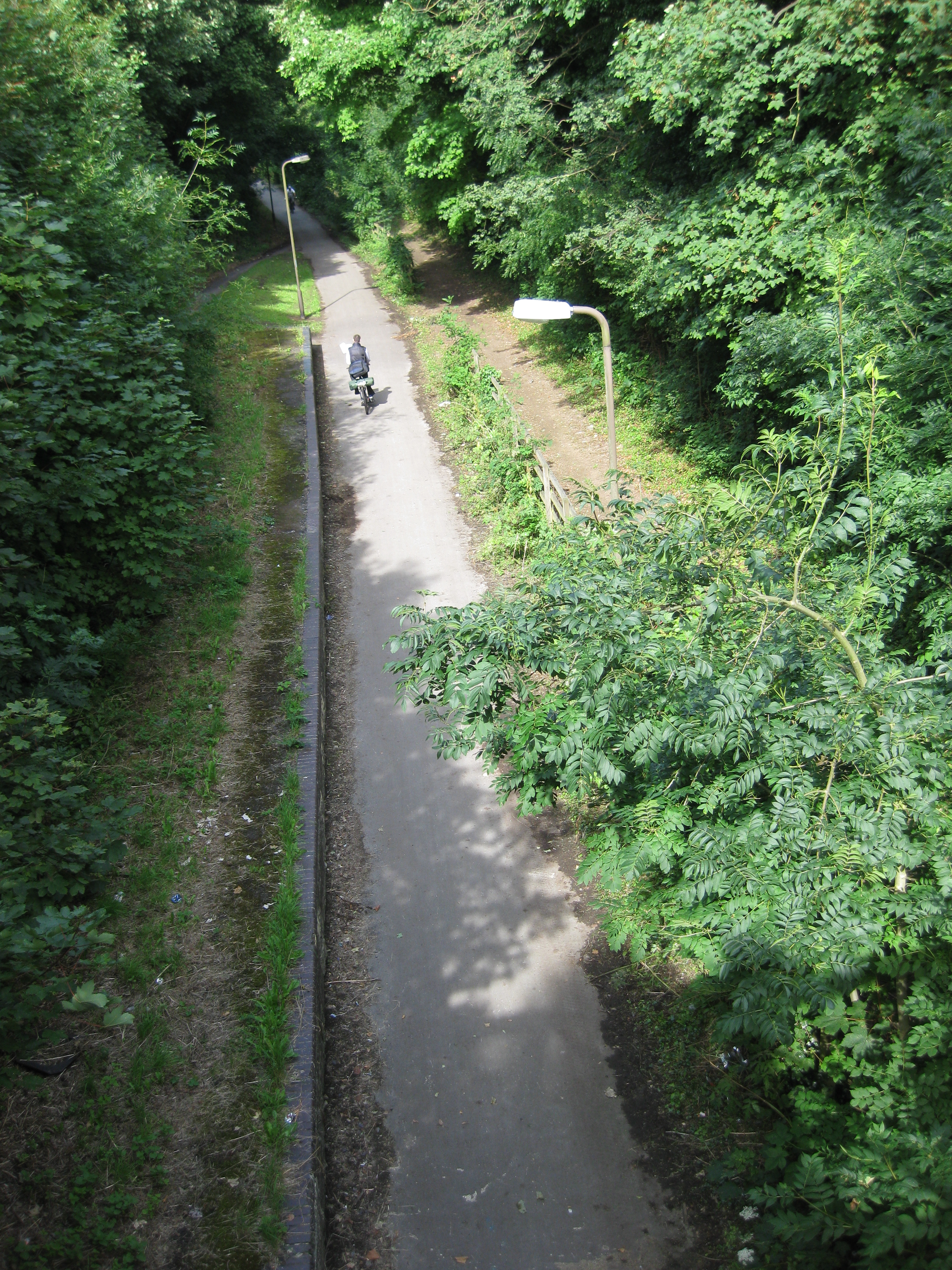
A redway runs along the disused track bed of the former Wolverton to Newport Pagnell Line.

The Milton Keynes redway system (locally known as redways) is an over 200 miles (320 kilometres) network of shared use paths for cyclists and pedestrians in Milton Keynes, Buckinghamshire, England. It is generally surfaced with red tarmac, and criss-crosses most of the city.

Some of these redways run next to the grid roads and local roads, with underpasses or bridges where they intersect major roads. Others run through park land and along the floodplain of the Great Ouse and its tributaries.

Construction of the redway commenced in the 1970s with the start of the construction of the "new city". By 1980 it was the largest urban cycleway system in the UK with 22 miles (35.4 km) in use.

== The Redway Code ==
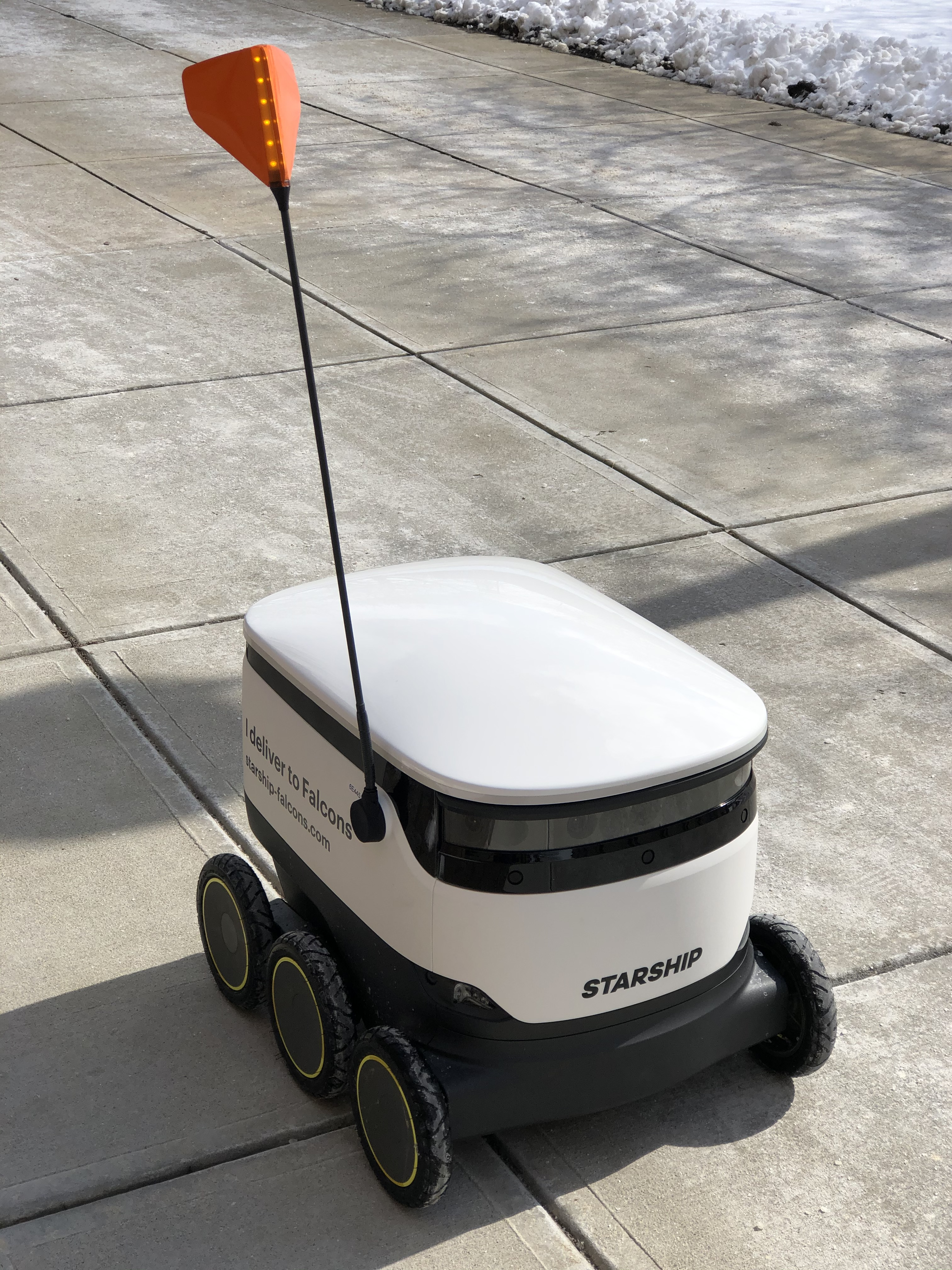
A Starship Technologies delivery robot, with its camera array visible

The redway system is restricted to cyclists, pedestrians, and powered wheelchairs. It may not be used by horses (except where they run along designated bridleways), motorcycles, mopeds or motor-scooters ("e-scooters"), though (walking-pace) electric delivery robots are permitted.

== National Cycle Network ==
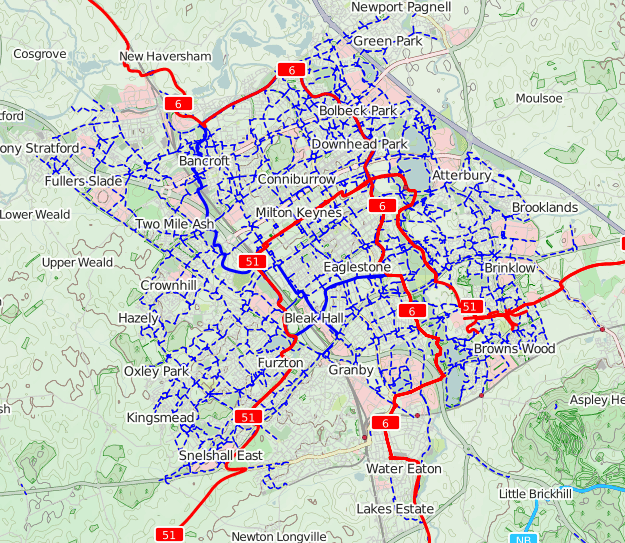
Cycleway network in Milton Keynes. NCR routes 6 and 51 are highlighted in red.

The national Sustrans National Cycle Network Route 6 (Derby – Luton) and Route 51 (Harwich - Cambridge – Oxford) runs to and through the city.

Route 6 enters Milton Keynes from the south following the Grand Union Canal in southern Bletchley. After a loop through central Bletchley close to Bletchley railway station and Bletchley Park, it resumes its track northwards via Fenny Stratford along the valley of the River Ouzel (near The Open University campus and Milton Keynes University Hospital) and the Grand Union to Campbell Park (where it intersects National Cycle Route 51 heading west to Central Milton Keynes and Milton Keynes Central railway station). At Great Linford, the route heads west along the former Wolverton to Newport Pagnell Line (now a rail trail). At Old Wolverton (near Wolverton railway station), the route crosses the River Great Ouse to leave the Milton Keynes Urban Area for the rural villages of Castlethorpe and Hanslope before crossing into Northamptonshire.

Route 51 enters the east of the city at Wavendon then turns north at Walton alongside the Grand Union to Willen Lake then west again to cross NCR6 at Campbell Park. It ascends westwards again through the Park to Central Milton Keynes, leaving the central business district beside Milton Keynes Central railway station. The route runs south by the 'teardrop lakes' to the National Bowl then west again past Furzton Lake, leaving the city at Tattenhoe.

Cycle storage can be found along route 51 at Milton Keynes Central train station (covered cycle racks) and at the junction of Midsummer Boulevard and Witan Gate where there are storage and changing facilities available. There are also frequent Sheffield cycle racks near the station, and outside the shopping centre and theatre, on both sides of Midsummer Boulevard. Cyclists appear to be encouraged to cycle through car parks (with two-way lanes) on each side of Midsummer Boulevard, and use pedestrian underpasses at the major junctions (cars use the roundabouts and/or traffic lights).

The Swan's Way long-distance footpath also uses part of the redway system.

== See also ==
- Cycleways in England
- Segregated cycle facilities
- Shared use path
