= Milton Keynes bus station =

Milton Keynes bus station may refer to one of a number of possible topics:

- The former Milton Keynes central bus station, which is no longer in use.
- The travel interchange outside Milton Keynes Central railway station, which has taken over the functions of the former bus station.
- Milton Keynes Coachway (beside M1 J14), used by National Express north/south services and Stagecoach east/west services.

== See also ==
- Bus services in Milton Keynes
