= Milton Keynes Central =

Milton Keynes Central may refer to:

- Milton Keynes central bus station
- Milton Keynes Central railway station
- Milton Keynes Central (UK Parliament constituency)

== See also ==
- Central Milton Keynes, the central business district of the city
