= Buses in Milton Keynes =

Bus services in and around Milton Keynes, England

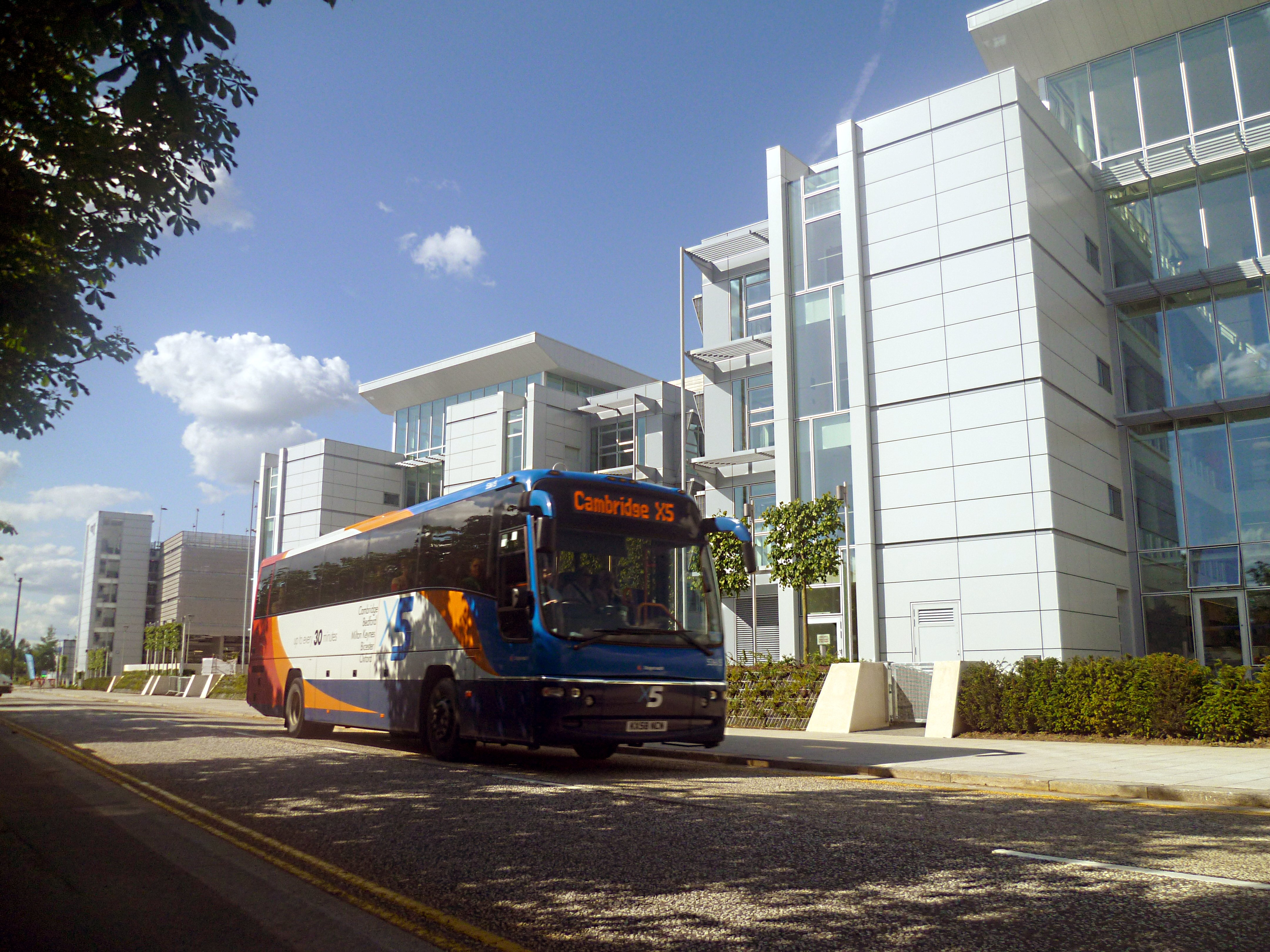
Route X5 from Oxford to Cambridge passing the Quadrant:MK

Buses in Milton Keynes are run by a mixture of operators on a network of urban and rural routes in and around the Milton Keynes urban area. These services have a varied history involving five different companies. At the foundation of the 'New City' in 1967 and for some years afterwards, Milton Keynes was served by a rural bus service between and to the pre-existing towns. Apart from a small-scale experimental service, urban buses arrived on the scene with deregulation in 1986. Since April 2010 the core local services have been provided by Arriva Shires & Essex. Long-distance coach services also serve MK, often via the Milton Keynes Coachway located near junction 14 of the M1 motorway.

== Urban Services ==
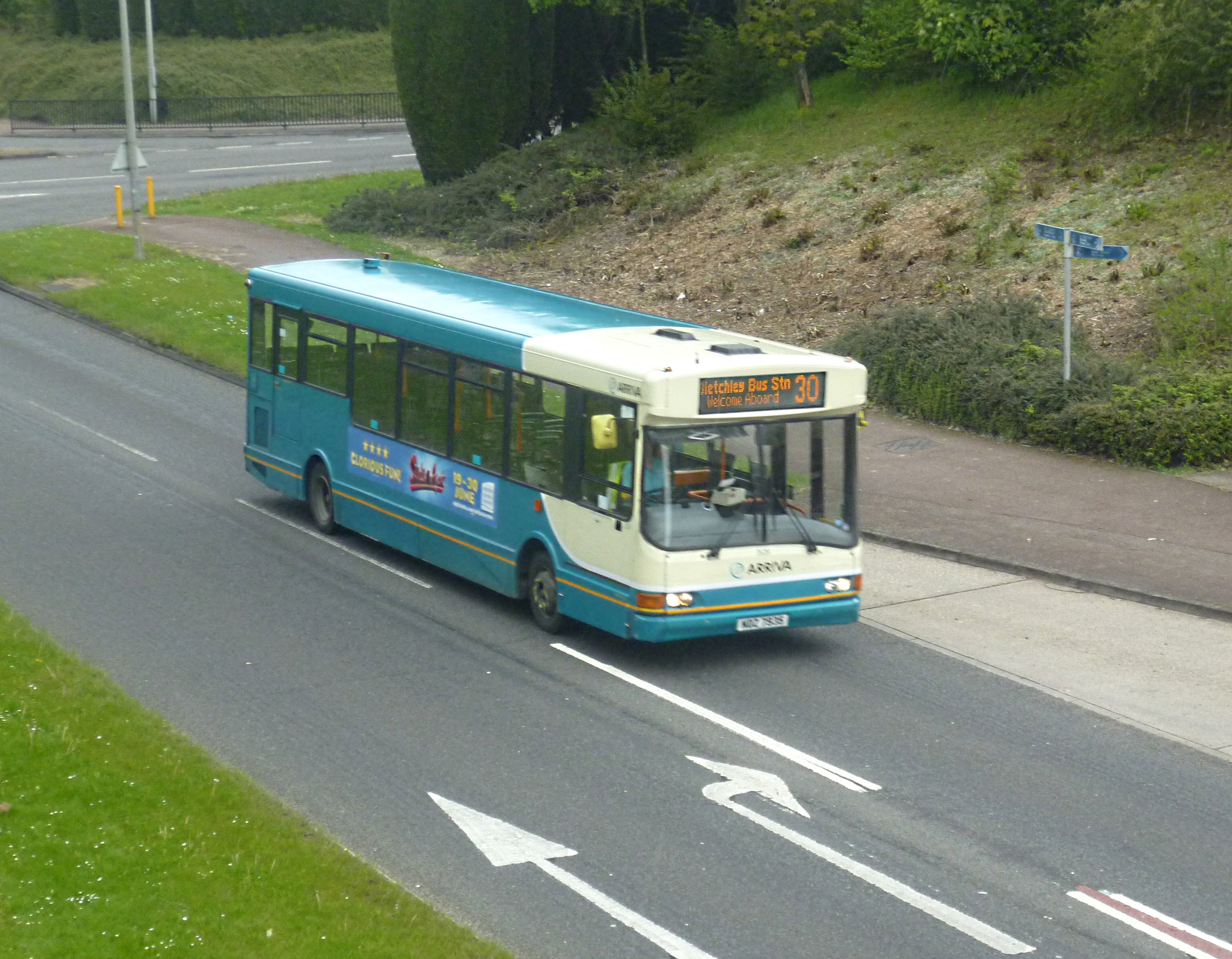
Arriva Shires & Essex operate a large fleet of single-deck vehicles throughout Milton Keynes. Here one is seen at Two Mile Ash.

Urban services in Milton Keynes have been operated by several companies under a wide range of names since the city's creation in 1967. Since 2010, the principal operator has been Arriva Shires & Essex, who acquired the independent MK Metro in 2006. The operation was initially branded as Arriva MK Star. The Arriva urban network has continually reduced in size since then and now consists of only the busiest key urban routes, with other areas being covered by Council contract routes or by other operators such as Uno and Stagecoach. A number of independent operators have begun providing services within the urban area where the Arriva network has contracted; principal among these are Aylesbury-based Red Rose Travel. Some of the longer distance routes detailed below also provide journeys within the urban area, such as Arriva Shires & Essex route 89, Red Rose Travel routes 21 linking Central Milton Keynes with Olney and Lavendon and the 100 Express Service providing a quicker link between Aylesbury and Milton Keynes and Z&S Transport route 50. Uno currently operates services C1, C10, C11 and CX to Cranfield with the C1, C10 and C11 continuing to Bedford. Stagecoach also operate service 41 through Olney and Lavendon from Northampton to Bedford.

(Bus services within Milton Keynes are complemented by a frequent train service between the major centres of Wolverton, Central Milton Keynes and Bletchley, operated by West Midlands Trains. A less frequent hourly train service on the Marston Vale Line also links Bletchley railway station to Fenny Stratford, Bow Brickhill, Woburn Sands and Aspley Guise railway stations between Mondays and Saturdays.)

== Long-distance services ==
A few long-distance services to Milton Keynes are operated by Arriva Shires & Essex, with others provided by and Stagecoach: these services interchange at the shopping centre and railway station. Other long-distance services run by National Express call at the Milton Keynes Coachway (where passengers may also interchange with East/West and London airports services).

=== Arriva Beds & Bucks ===
Arriva Beds & Bucks operate the X1 express coach to Luton via Hockliffe and Dunstable, the routes X2 and X3 (which link Milton Keynes to Luton Airport via Leighton Buzzard, Dunstable and Luton) and the X6 route to Aylesbury via Buckingham and Winslow. Arriva also operate the local service 33 to Northampton.

=== Stagecoach ===
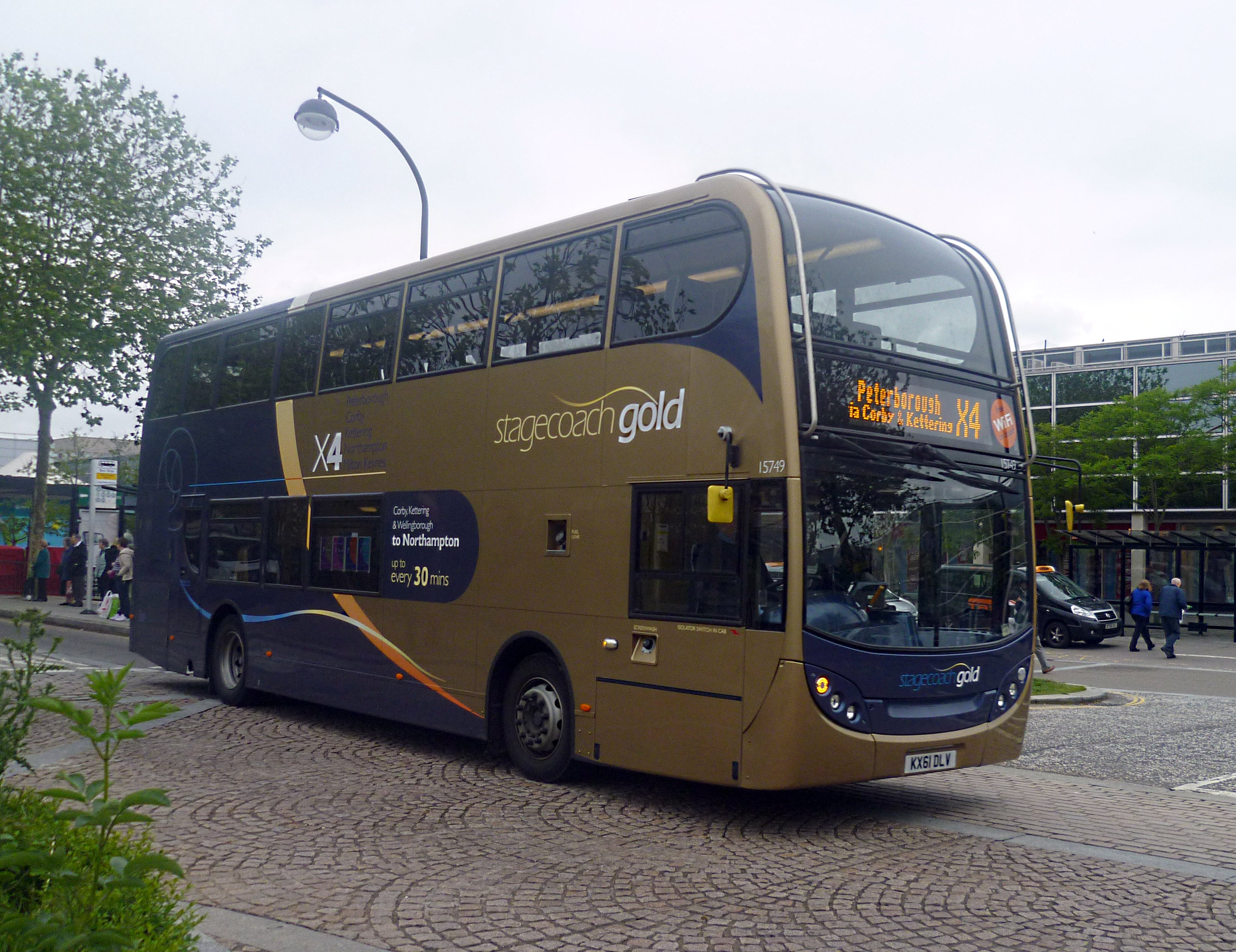
Stagecoach Gold service X4 Alexander Dennis Enviro400 bodied Scania N230UD passing through Central Milton Keynes.

Stagecoach operate four express routes, four local services and one school service into Milton Keynes. These are run by the Stagecoach East and Stagecoach Midlands divisions of what was previously United Counties Omnibus.

Route X5 links Oxford and Bedford via Bicester, Buckingham, Milton Keynes, Bedford, where it normally connects with service 905 which started in 2020, to continue the journey through to Cambridge via St Neots The services run seven days a week. The X5 serves both Central Milton Keynes and the Milton Keynes Coachway for onward connections to North–South services. The route was launched in September 1995 and used the Cross Country brand. New Plaxton Panther coaches were introduced to the route in March 2009.

Route X6, runs from Milton Keynes to Northampton.

Stagecoach also operate the MK1 bus service linking Milton Keynes Central railway station with Luton railway station and Luton Airport(formerly 99 coach service and VT99 and used dedicated coaches in Virgin Trains livery. However the route is now operated as a normal Stagecoach service.

4 times a day Monday to Saturday the X91 which Stagecoach Midlands also runs provides a link to Towcester and then normally on to Silverstone to terminate and return to Milton Keynes.

In addition to the express routes, the schooldays only route 83 to Silverstone via Wolverton and Buckingham.

== Milton Keynes Coachway ==
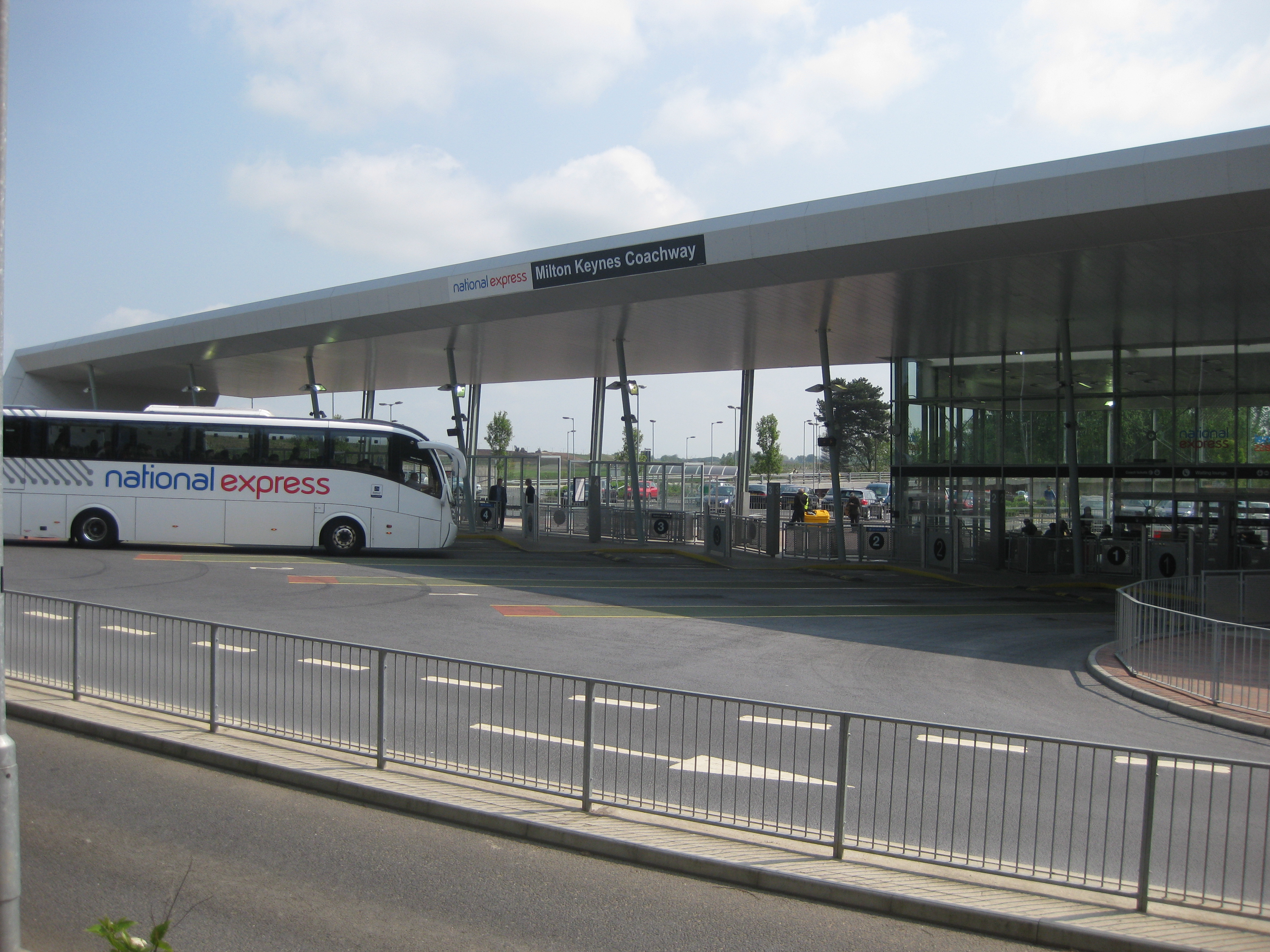
The coach bays at Milton Keynes Coachway

Milton Keynes Coachway is the second busiest coach station in the United Kingdom. It is situated on the eastern edge of Milton Keynes close to junction 14 of the M1 motorway on the A509 road. There has been a coach interchange at the junction of the M1 since 1989. The present (replacement) building opened in December 2010.

Most north-south National Express services along the M1 stop here, as does the east-west X5 service between Oxford and Cambridge. The local 3 service (which also serves the adjacent park and ride) provides a link between the Coachway and Central MK (and the Central railway station for other bus, coach and train interchanges).

== Milton Keynes central bus station ==
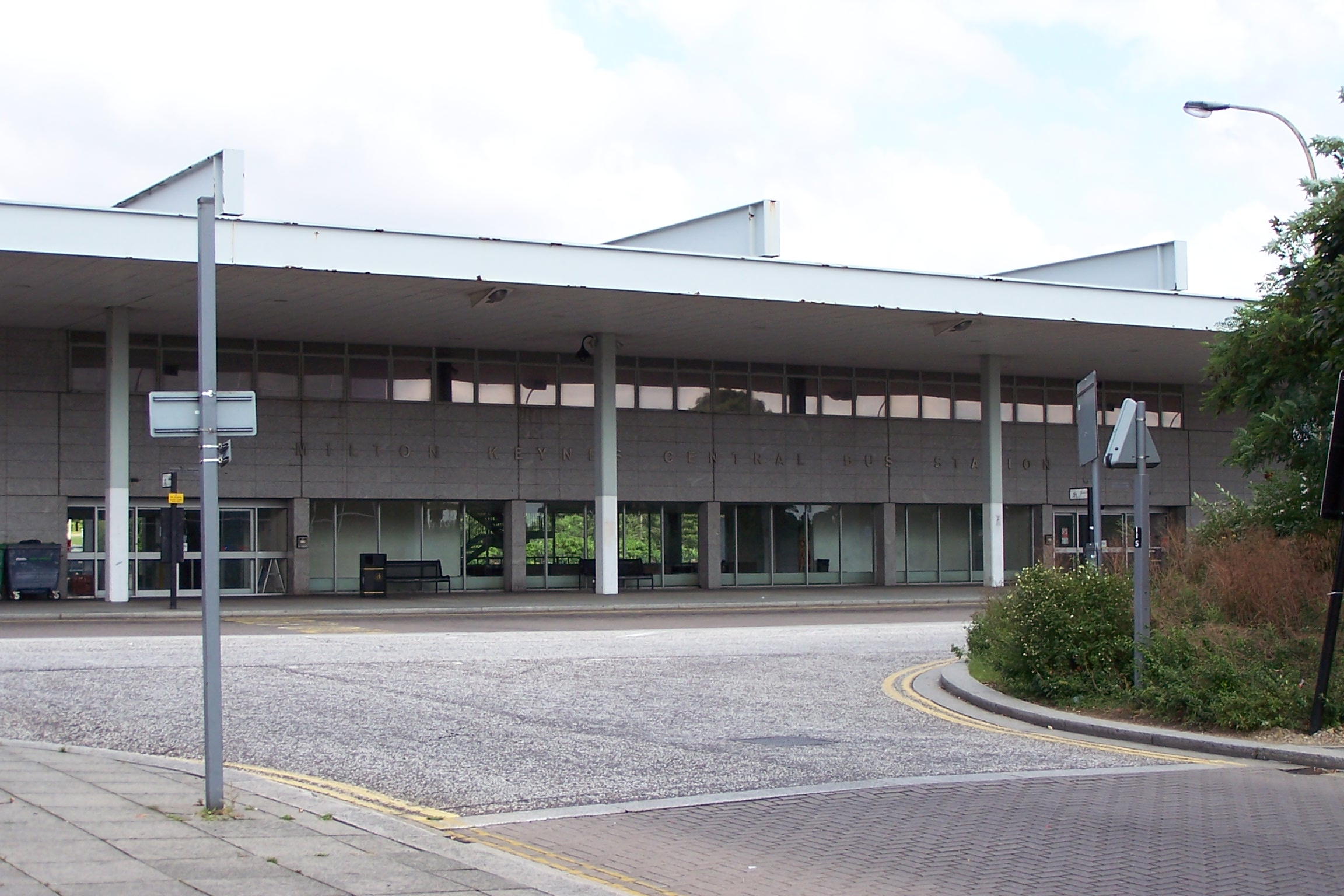
Milton Keynes central bus station in 2006

A central bus station for Milton Keynes was designed by Derek Yeadon of Milton Keynes Development Corporation and built in 1982/83 opposite Milton Keynes Central railway station. On 4 August 2014, the design and construction of the building was recognised by being Grade II listed by the Department for Culture, Media and Sport on the advice of English Heritage. The citation remarks

"The design of the bus station with its projecting canopy, exposed steel girders and lightweight supporting steel columns, draws on influential buildings by the acclaimed modernist architect Mies van der Rohe, whose ideology inspired the new town plan and its buildings. There is a sculptural quality to some of its internal features and the core building is detailed to an unusually high standard for its use.

Since 1997, the building ceased to be used for its original purpose and the bus interchange is now in front of the railway station. The building was subsequently repurposed as a youth centre, and a skate park named the Buszy was built. The youth centre was closed in 2016 when its operators ("Make a Difference") and the building owners (Milton Keynes Development Partnership, an arm's length agency of Milton Keynes Council) failed to reach an agreement for its continuance.

The skate park (The Buszy) is an important skate spot, attracting professional skateboarders from around the world and has been featured in numerous skate videos. The park is free to use by all and remains in regular use. The Buszy's cultural importance and significance in UK skateboarding is substantial. The skate park was designed by designer Richard Ferrington and professional skateboarder Rob Selley. The facility has been identified as an exemplar for local authorities around the UK.

As of December 2018, the upper part of the building is being used as a dance studio. The lower area of the building has been used to provide assistance to homeless people.

== History ==
=== United Counties ===
From 1967 until 1986, services between the major centres in Milton Keynes were run by United Counties Omnibus. Depots in Bletchley and Stony Stratford were used until 1983, when they were replaced by a new depot in the city centre. The services were operated with a mixture of double-decker buses and some large single-deck vehicles according to the historical rural bus service model. Although they were relatively frequent and ran for most of the day, buses could not easily serve new developments as the roads were not wide enough. When it was designed, the city had been intended for every household to own a car. Bus priority schemes did not exist, and stops were often sited away from population centres, although no house was more than 400 metres from a stop. New services were often poorly used in their early years as development in each area of the city built up over time, and such routes required significant subsidies. This was partially offset by the low running costs encountered when running on the trunk roads around the city.

One area in which operations were successful was fares. A zonal system was operated with five single fares. A multi-journey ticket named Quad was offered, offering four single journeys of any length at a lower cost, and by the early 1980s was the most popular ticket in the city. Around 60% of tickets were sold off-bus. Subsidies for loss-making services were provided by Buckinghamshire County Council and Milton Keynes Borough Council. In its later years, the operation traded under the Citybus name. A new depot and the central bus station were built in 1983 at a combined cost of £6.5 million.

In 1986 United Counties was split into smaller divisions in readiness for deregulation, and Milton Keynes depot formed a new company, Milton Keynes Citybus.

==== Milton Keynes Dial-a-Bus ====
To deal with the impracticality of a conventional staged bus service in the low-density new districts, Milton Keynes Development Corporation decided in 1973 to adopt and adapt the American Dial-a-ride concept, initially in Woughton Parish. According to this system, users who needed transport could call a central dispatch office and have a nearby (radio-controlled) Mercedes-Benz mini-bus diverted to the caller's street. The service began in 1975. Operation of the service was contracted to the incumbent operator, United Counties, which chose to operate it under its existing agreements with drivers. The service did not survive long.

=== Milton Keynes Citybus ===
Milton Keynes Citybus (initially Milton Keynes City Bus) was formed in January 1986 to take over the Milton Keynes depot of United Counties. It was privatised on 7 August 1987 and introduced a policy of operating minibuses in an unusual two-tone grey livery. It took over a small independent, Johnson's of Hanslope, in 1990 and initially retained this as a separate operation. Other brandings introduced in 1992 were County Line and Buckinghamshire Road Car; all were run with a mixture of full-size vehicles and minibuses.

In November 1992 Milton Keynes Citybus was taken over by Cambus Holdings. The three offshoots were merged under the Road Car name, and the operation was expanded at the expense of the main company. New liveries were also introduced in 1993, with Citybus becoming red and cream and Road Car green and white. The company was officially renamed MK Metro in 1994, but this was not used as a fleet name.

=== MK Metro ===
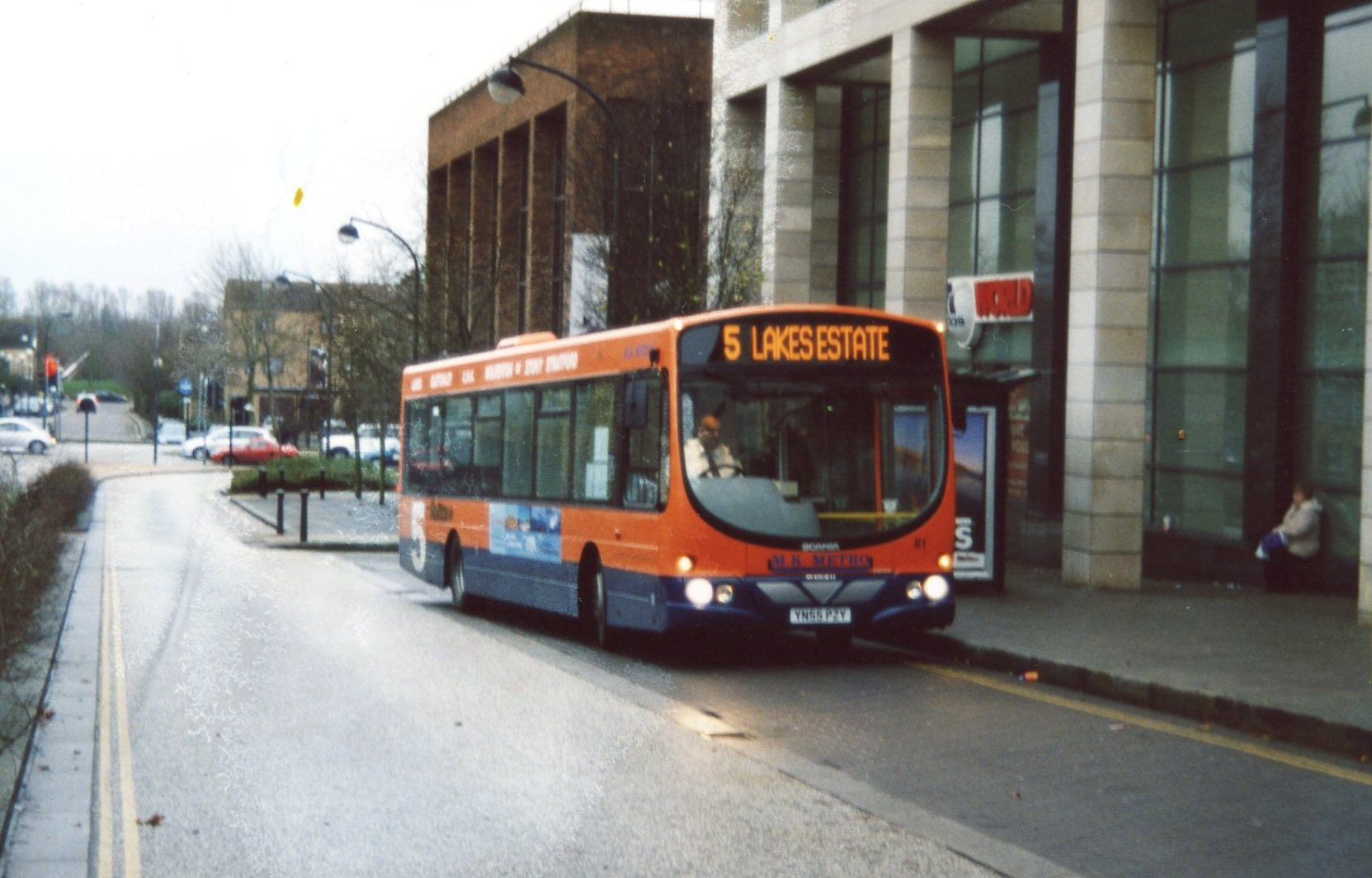
A MK Metro Scania L94UB branded for route 5 in Milton Keynes shortly after MK Metro became part of Arriva Shires & Essex

Cambus Holdings Ltd was acquired by Stagecoach Group in late 1995. An investigation by the Office of Fair Trading (OFT) concluded that this had led to an unacceptable monopoly of bus operations in Cambridgeshire, Corby, East Northamptonshire, Kettering, Wellingborough, Bedford and Mid Bedfordshire. Stagecoach was ordered to sell the Milton Keynes and Huntingdon operations to avoid the deal being referred to the Monopolies & Mergers Commission. The OFT also stipulated that both depots must be sold to the same buyer.

Milton Keynes Citybus was purchased on 2 May 1997 by bus entrepreneur Julian Peddle, using a new Premier Buses Ltd company both to operate in Huntingdon and as a holding company with which to purchase Milton Keynes Citybus. The Milton Keynes operation was rebranded as MK Metro with a bright yellow and blue livery. Peddle was unable to fund new vehicles for both companies, and sold Premier to Blazefield in 1998.

In the nine years that MK Metro was owned by Peddle ridership increased by 120% and the company became profitable. Between 1998 and 2003 passenger numbers rose by 63% following the introduction of new buses and ticketing schemes. It became part of his Status Bus & Coach mini-group – an attempt to co-ordinate the resources of small independents to save money – at its formation in 1999, but the group proved largely unsuccessful and had broken up by 2004.

=== Arriva ===
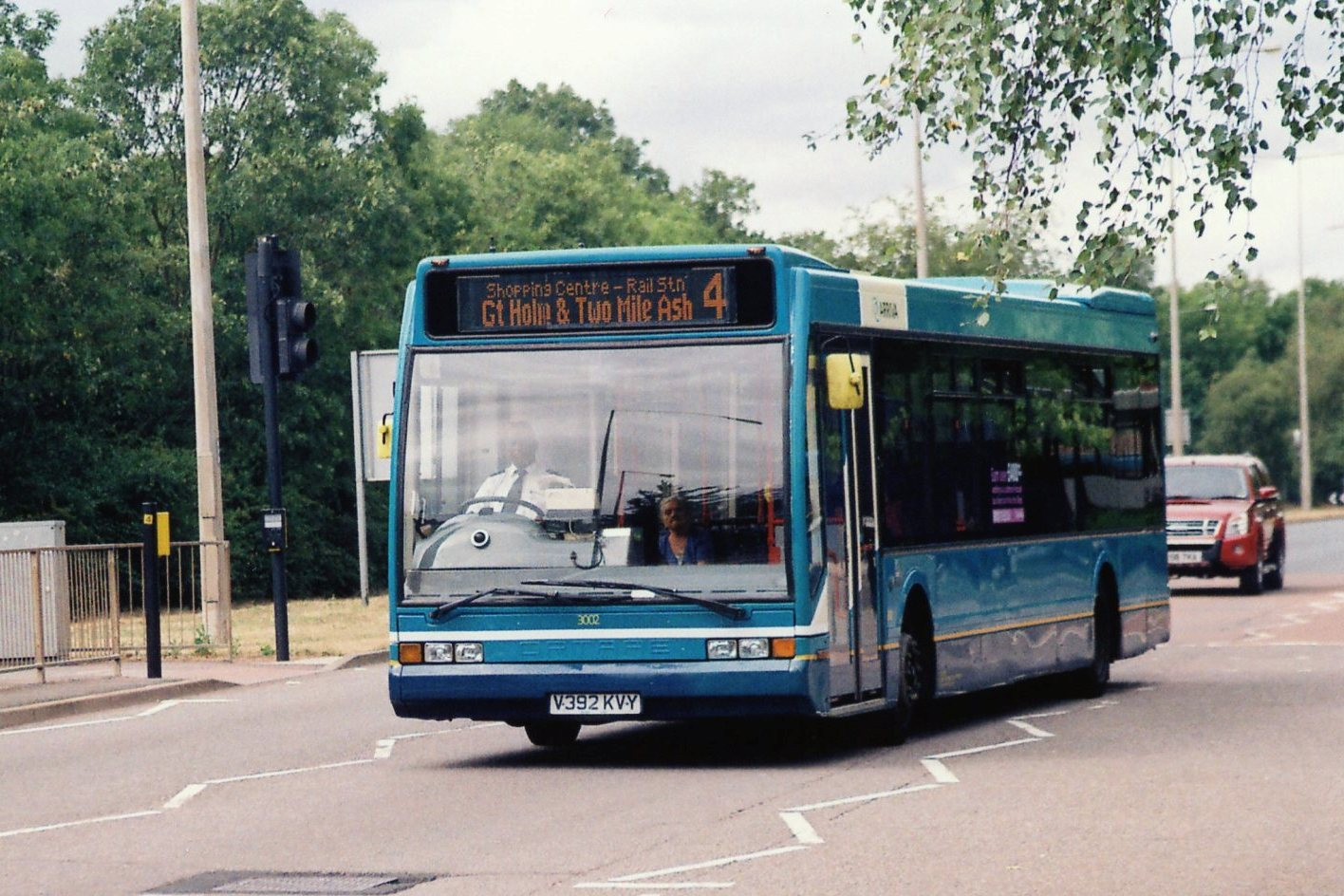
An Optare Excel new to MK Metro operating with Arriva Shires & Essex at Bletchley bus station in 2010. Many services within the Milton Keynes urban area are operated by Arriva.

In February 2006, the operations of MK Metro were purchased by Arriva for £5.6 million, and operational control transferred to the Arriva Shires & Essex division. Peddle cited disagreement between authorities as a major factor in his decision to sell the company. The purchase was considered by the Office of Fair Trading for possible referral to the Competition Commission, but it was decided not to do so.

The Milton Keynes operation continued to use the MK Metro name until April 2010, when they were rebranded as Arriva Milton Keynes (temporarily using the brand name MK Star). The change of name coincided with a number of controversial service changes. Some services were in fact improved in frequency as part of the rebranding but others were reduced or even eliminated, and some journey times were increased.

=== Other Operators ===
Since deregulation in 1986 there have been some competing companies in Milton Keynes, although it has seen less competition than most cities. London-based R&I Tours began competing with Milton Keynes Citybus in 1992 using the trading name Inter MK. They operated 10 single-deck buses, mostly Leyland Nationals in a two-tone blue livery, on a small number of routes in MK. They withdrew from MK in 1994 and were subsequently taken over by MTL.

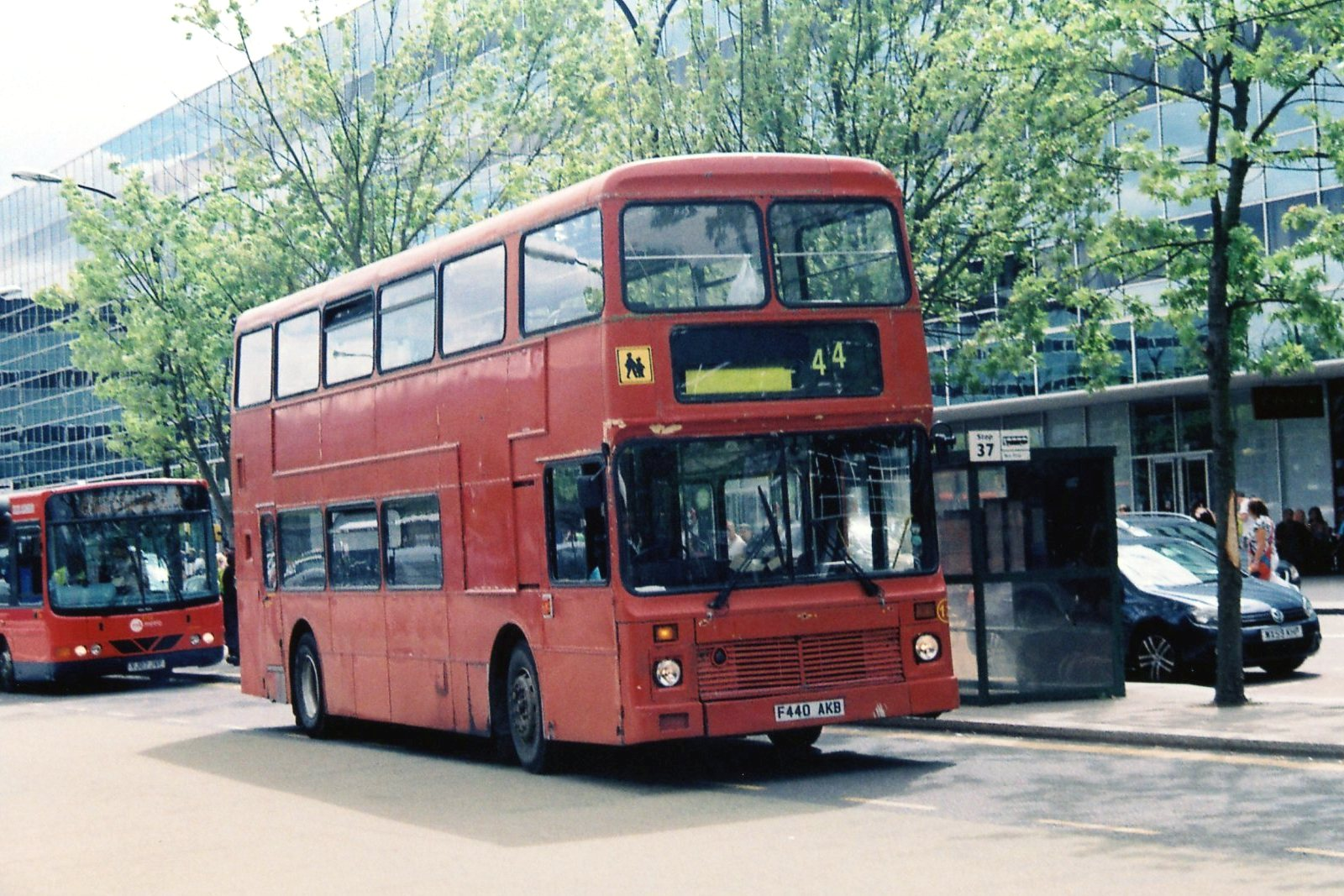
A Leyland Olympian at Milton Keynes Central railway station working on route 44 with On A Mission

In November 2009 a new competing route 44 between Central Milton Keynes and Lakes Estate was launched by coach company On A Mission. It was later extended across Milton Keynes to Wolverton, and also included a single school bus journey. However, the company collapsed on 2 August 2010 and the route no longer operates. The school bus journey was replaced by a tendered route.

=== EasyBus ===
EasyBus, an intercity express coach operator founded by entrepreneur Stelios Haji-Ioannou, ran a service between Milton Keynes and London between August 2004 and February 2006 using 19-seat Mercedes-Benz Vario mini-coaches. Tickets were predominantly sold over the internet. Its parent EasyGroup first announced its intention to operate no frills express services in 2003. In August 2004 EasyBus launched its first service, connecting London and Milton Keynes. To keep costs down EasyBus originally used Hendon Central station in north London as its terminal point, with a journey time of 65 minutes and a single fare of £5. The threat of competition forced National Express to offer its own discounted fares to and from London, culminating in the introduction of a £1 single fare between Milton Keynes and London which Stelios claimed was intended to make his service non-profitable and force its withdrawal.

In Spring 2005 EasyBus changed its London terminus from Hendon to a more central location in Baker Street. The service to Milton Keynes was withdrawn in February 2006, although services from London to other destinations including Luton Airport continue to operate.

=== Virgin Trains ===
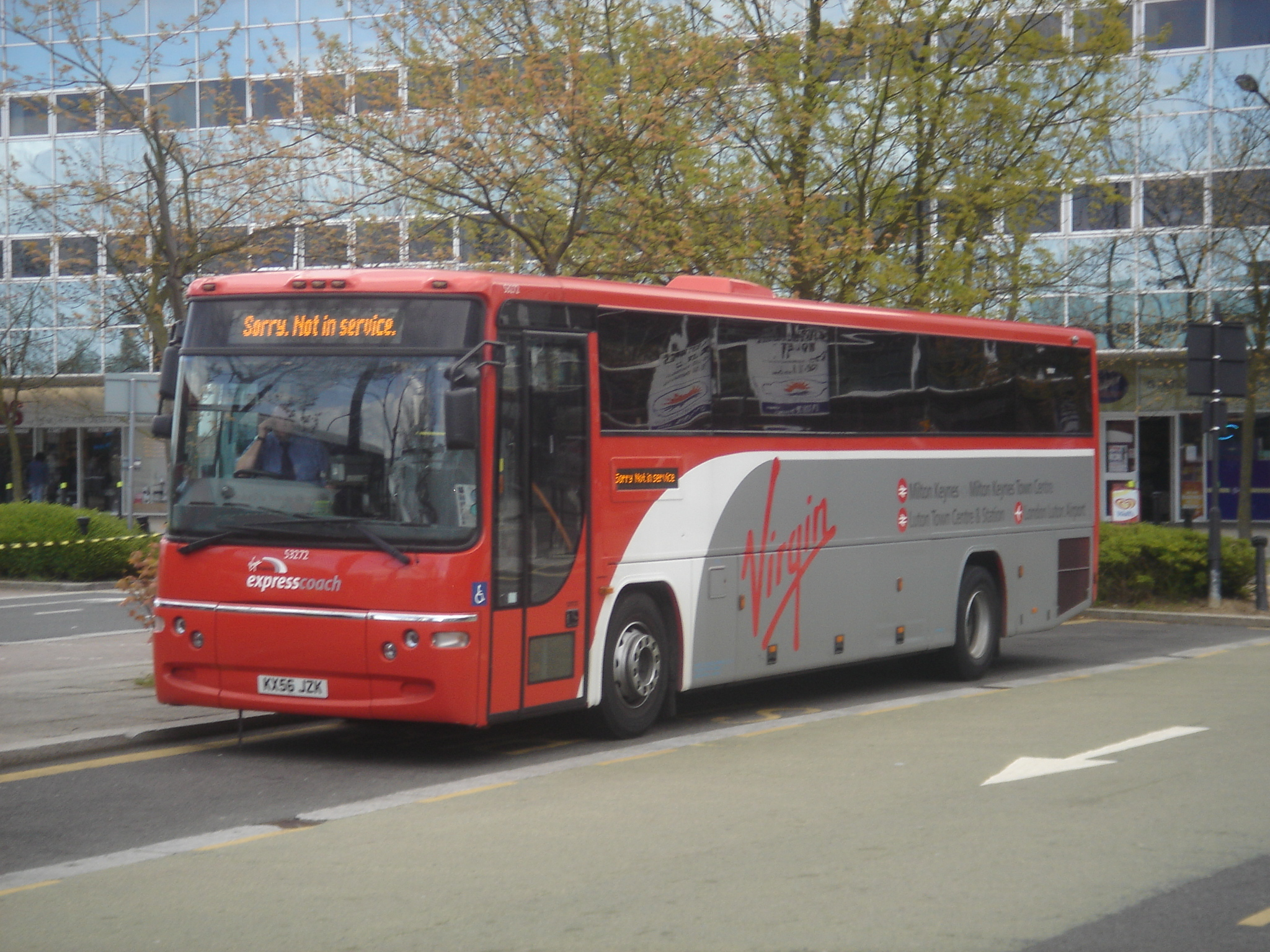
Virgin Trains ExpressCoach Plaxton Profile bodied Volvo B7R at Milton Keynes station in May 2009

In 1999, Stagecoach commenced operating route VT99 from Milton Keynes Central to Luton railway station and Luton Airport under contract to Virgin Trains West Coast, with coaches in a dedicated livery to provide a connection for West Coast Main Line passengers to the airport. At the end of the contract and no longer carrying Virgin Trains branding, Stagecoach continued to operate the service as route 99 with vehicles in its own livery, subsequently renumbering it as MK1.

== Ticketing ==
In June 2012 Milton Keynes council introduced a new multi-operator ticket, MK Move. As of September 2013 it is valid on all services of nine participating operators within the borough, with the exception of Stagecoach's X5.
