= Virgin Trains ExpressCoach =

Defunct coach brand

- Industry: Coach transport
- Founded: 30 May 1999
- Defunct: circa 2009
- Parent: Virgin Rail Group

Virgin Trains ExpressCoach (formerly Virgin CoachLink) was a coach brand in England owned by the Virgin Rail Group.

== History ==
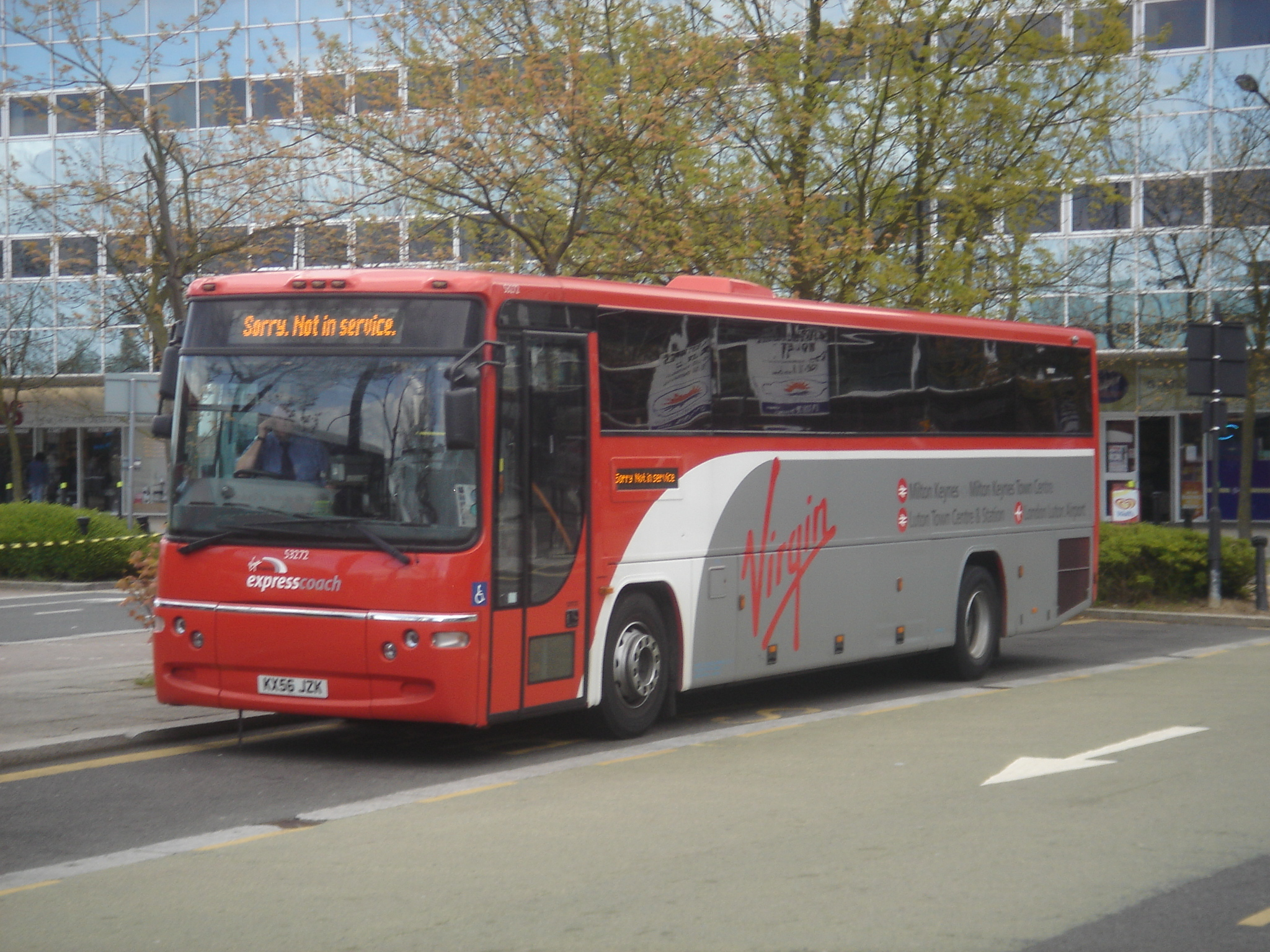
Plaxton Profile bodied Volvo B7R at Milton Keynes station in May 2009

As part of Virgin Rail Group's winning bid for the InterCity West Coast franchise, it committed to introducing coach links with through ticketing to destinations off the West Coast Main Line.

On 30 May 1999, services from Stratford-upon-Avon to Coventry station, the Peak District to Macclesfield station, Bromsgrove to Birmingham International station and Luton Airport to Milton Keynes Central station (VT99) commenced. On the same day a service from Hampshire to Southampton station on Virgin's CrossCountry franchise was introduced. All were operated by Stagecoach subsidiaries, Stagecoach having a 49% shareholding in the Virgin Rail Group. A service from Heathrow Airport to Watford Junction station was introduced in September 2005, being withdrawn in May 2008.

The service between Milton Keynes and Luton Airport was relaunched by Stagecoach Bedford and Virgin Trains in 2006. The services no longer operate with Virgin Trains branding; however, some are still operated as Stagecoach services.
