= National Hockey Stadium (Milton Keynes) =

Former sports stadium

- The Hockey Stadium
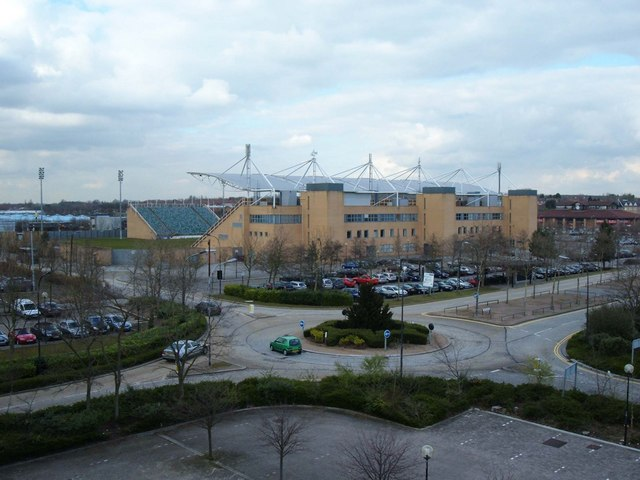
- Interactive map of National Hockey Stadium
- Full name: National Hockey Stadium and Conference Centre
- Location: Milton Keynes
- Owner: English Partnerships
- Capacity: 4,000 (hockey); 9,000 (football)
- Field size: 100 x 64 m

Construction
- Built: 1995
- Opened: 1995
- Closed: 2007
- Demolished: 2010

Tenants
- England Hockey (1995–2003); Wimbledon F.C. (2003–04); Milton Keynes Dons F.C. (2004–07)

The National Hockey Stadium was a sports stadium in Milton Keynes, Buckinghamshire, England, with a nominal capacity of around 4,000 seats: this was temporarily increased to 9,000 between 2003 and 2007. It was used by England Hockey as their national stadium from 1995 to 2003 and then as a professional football stadium from 2003 by Wimbledon F.C., renamed as Milton Keynes Dons F.C. in 2004.

In summer 2007, the Dons relocated to the new Stadium MK, near Bletchley, leaving the hockey stadium without a tenant. It was unused for two years and, in late 2009, demolition began in preparation for the redevelopment of the site into the new Network Rail headquarters which became operational in July 2012.

== Hockey ==
The stadium was built in 1995 as a new national field hockey stadium, with a synthetic pitch. The ground was used for national and international (field) hockey until 2003. It had a covered main stand running the full length of one side of the pitch, opposite which was an unroofed stand running about one third of the length of the pitch, straddling the halfway line.

In 1997, the stadium was used as the venue for the sixth edition of the FIH Men's Junior World Cup. It was also the venue, in 2000, for the FIH Women's Qualifying Tournament for the Sydney 2000 Olympic Games.

In 2003, after the ground was leased to Wimbledon F.C., a grass pitch was laid, meaning that the stadium was out of commission for hockey. Temporary stands were added at either end of the pitch. Hockey internationals and playoff matches were reallocated to various leading club grounds around the country. In May 2007, at the end of the lease, the temporary stands were removed.

On 2 April 2007, the trustees of the National Hockey Foundation, which owned the lease of the stadium, announced that they had arranged to hand the lease back to English Partnerships. A detailed study had shown that the stadium would no longer be viable as a hockey venue, especially as plans were in place to build the Olympic Hockey Centre in Stratford, London, as part of the 2012 Summer Olympics facilities.

== Football ==
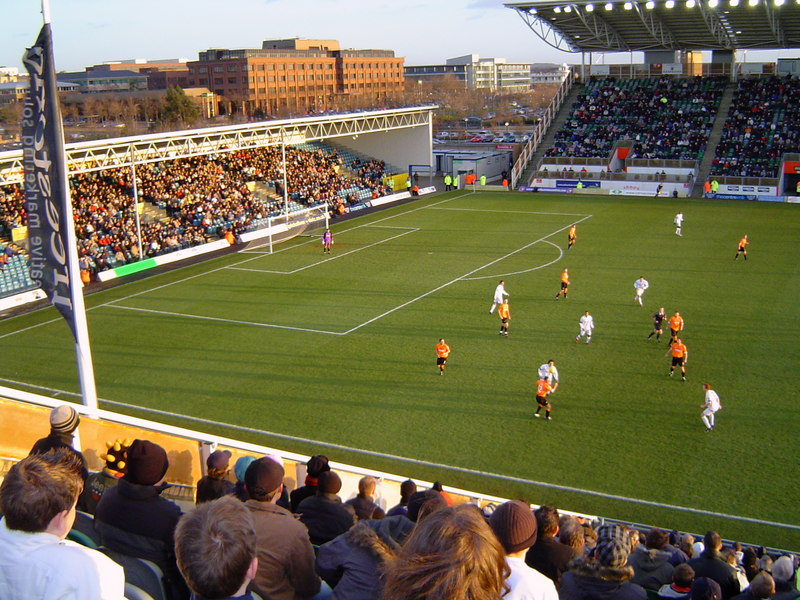
Milton Keynes Dons vs Blackpool in 2004

The stadium was the home of Wimbledon FC (renamed Milton Keynes Dons in June 2004) from September 2003 until May 2007. The Dons converted the synthetic pitch to grass and added additional stands and seating (with up to 9,000 seats). In July 2007, they moved to the new Stadium MK at Denbigh North, near Bletchley, prior to the start of the 2007–08 season.

Record attendance at the National Hockey Stadium:

- 8,306 v Tottenham Hotspur, League Cup 3rd Round, 25 October 2006

Average attendances at the National Hockey Stadium:

- 2004–2005: 4,896 (League One)
- 2005–2006: 5,776 (League One)
- 2006–2007: 6,034 (League Two)

== Demolition ==
After the Dons left for Denbigh, the supplementary seating was removed, returning the capacity to 4,000. However, the venue was not used notably thereafter. At end of October 2008, English Partnerships (owners of the site) announced agreement with Network Rail to make the site available for a new headquarters building, which meant that the stadium would be demolished.

On 17 December 2009, demolition of the stadium began and the site was cleared by March 2010. Quadrant:MK opened in June 2012.

== Location ==
- The stadium was just beside Milton Keynes Central railway station, near the A509 exit from the A5.
- Coordinates: 52.037739°N 0.775014°W / SP 841,384
