= Quadrant:MK =

Network Rail offices in Milton Keynes

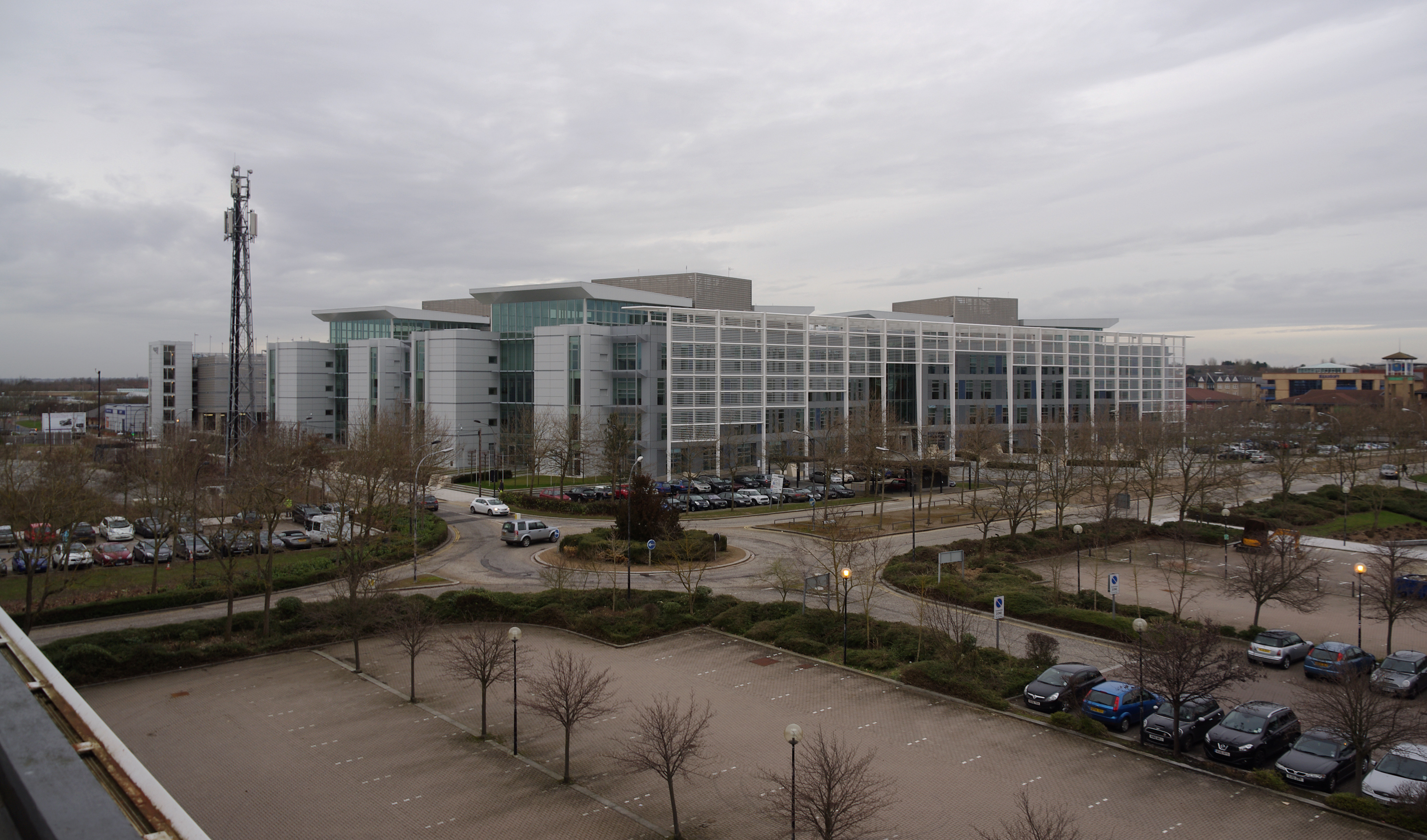
- Quadrant:MK in February 2013
- Interactive map of area around Quadrant:MK, showing the West Coast Main Line, Milton Keynes Central and the A5

General information
- Location: Milton Keynes, England
- Coordinates: 52°2′15.86″N 0°46′30.05″W
- Construction started: 2009
- Topped-out: 14 April 2011
- Opened: 11 June 2012
- Cost: £107 million
- Client: Network Rail
- Landlord: Network Rail

Other information
- Seating capacity: 3,000 employees
- Parking: adjacent multi-story

The Quadrant:MK is Network Rail's national operations centre, located in Milton Keynes. After being topped out in April 2011, it opened in June 2012. The complex consists of four linked buildings with 37,000 square metres (400,000 sq ft) of space, and is designed to accommodate 3,000 staff.

The complex was designed by GMW Architects and built by Royal BAM Group. The centre is on the site of the former England National Hockey Stadium, adjacent to Milton Keynes Central railway station and the A509/A5 intersection.
