= Stagecoach X5 =

Bus service between Oxford and Bedford, England

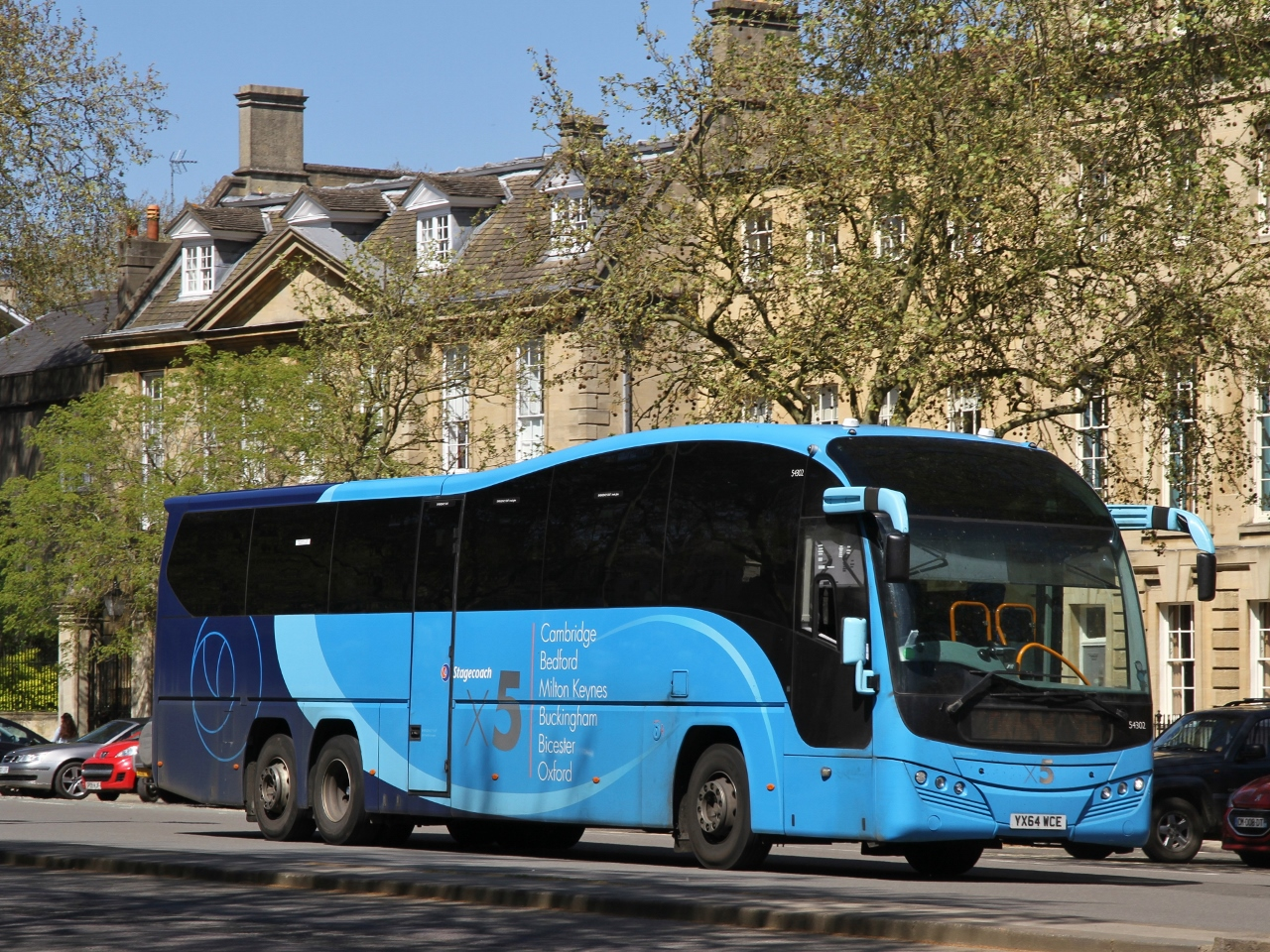
- Plaxton Elite bodied Volvo B11R in St Giles', Oxford in May 2018

Overview
- Operator: Stagecoach in Bedford
- Garage: Bedford
- Vehicle: Volvo B9R (2009–14); Volvo B11R (2014–21); ADL Enviro400 MMC (2021-present)
- Predecessors: Stagecoach United Counties

Route
- Start: Gloucester Green bus station, Oxford
- Via: Bicester, Buckingham, Milton Keynes, Milton Keynes Coachway
- End: Bedford Bus Station
- Length: 85 miles (137 km)

Service
- Level: Daily
- Frequency: 30

Stagecoach X5 is an inter-urban bus service linking Oxford and Bedford via Bicester, Buckingham and Milton Keynes

Service started in 1992 with an hourly service between Oxford and Cambridge, which was increased to half-hourly in 2005; new vehicles were introduced in 2009 and again in 2015. It operates with a 30-minute frequency for much of the day. Vehicles advertise free WiFi access, air conditioning and leather seats and are wheelchair accessible. The route carried 500,000 users in 2008; passenger numbers grew by 150% between 2004 and 2009, leading to some problems with overcrowding.

As of 2014, according to Stagecoach East's Managing Director, Andy Campbell, the route carries on average 1.3 million passengers annually. It is operated by the group's Stagecoach in Bedford division.

At the end of August 2020, the route was reduced to terminate at Bedford, with passengers on the Bedford – Cambridge leg being transferred to a local bus service. As of February 2020, to travel between Oxford and Cambridge directly by bus takes about four and half hours. (The same journey by rail via London takes less than three hours; by car it takes less than two hours.)

== History ==
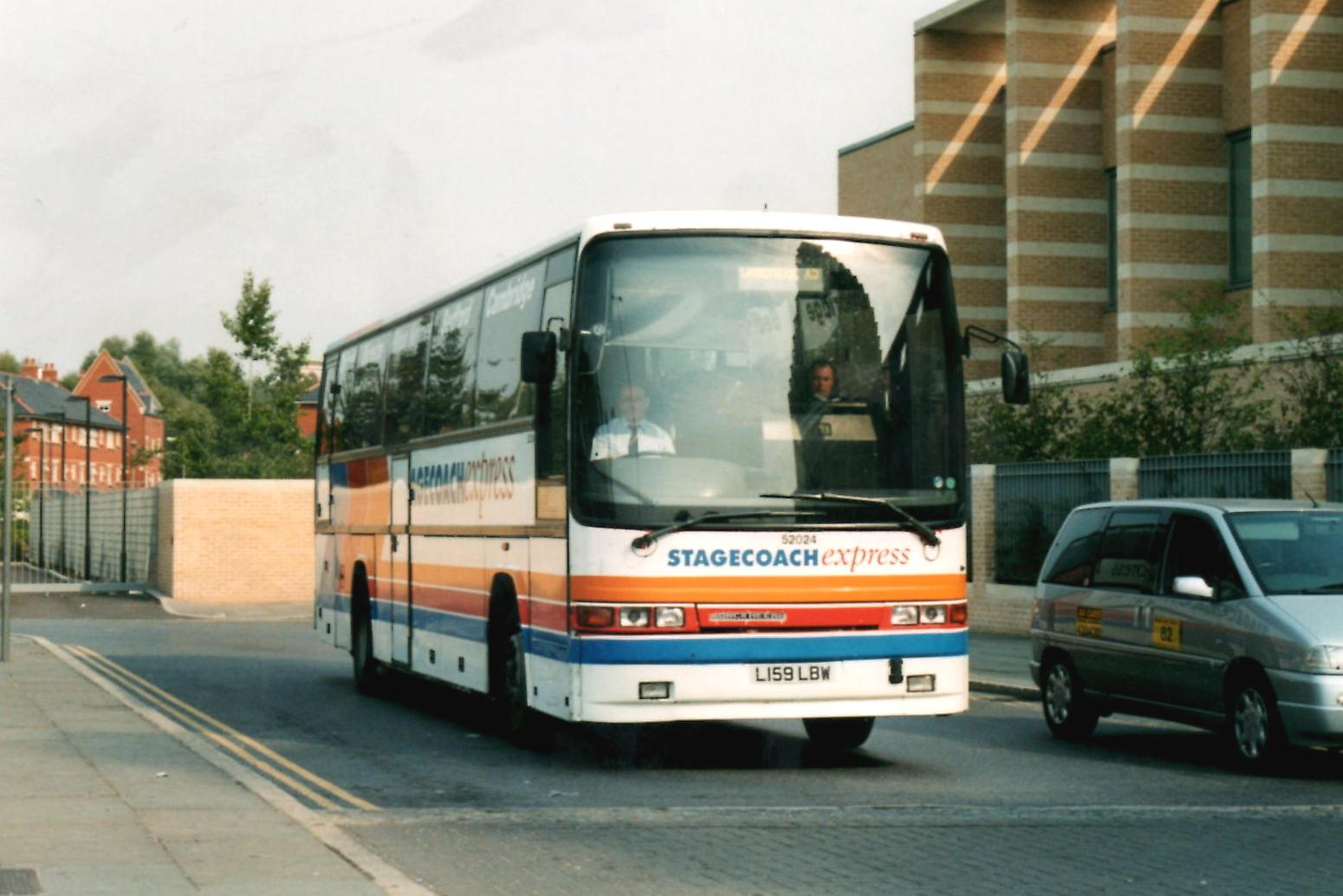
Jonckheere bodied Volvo B10M at Oxford railway station in October 2003

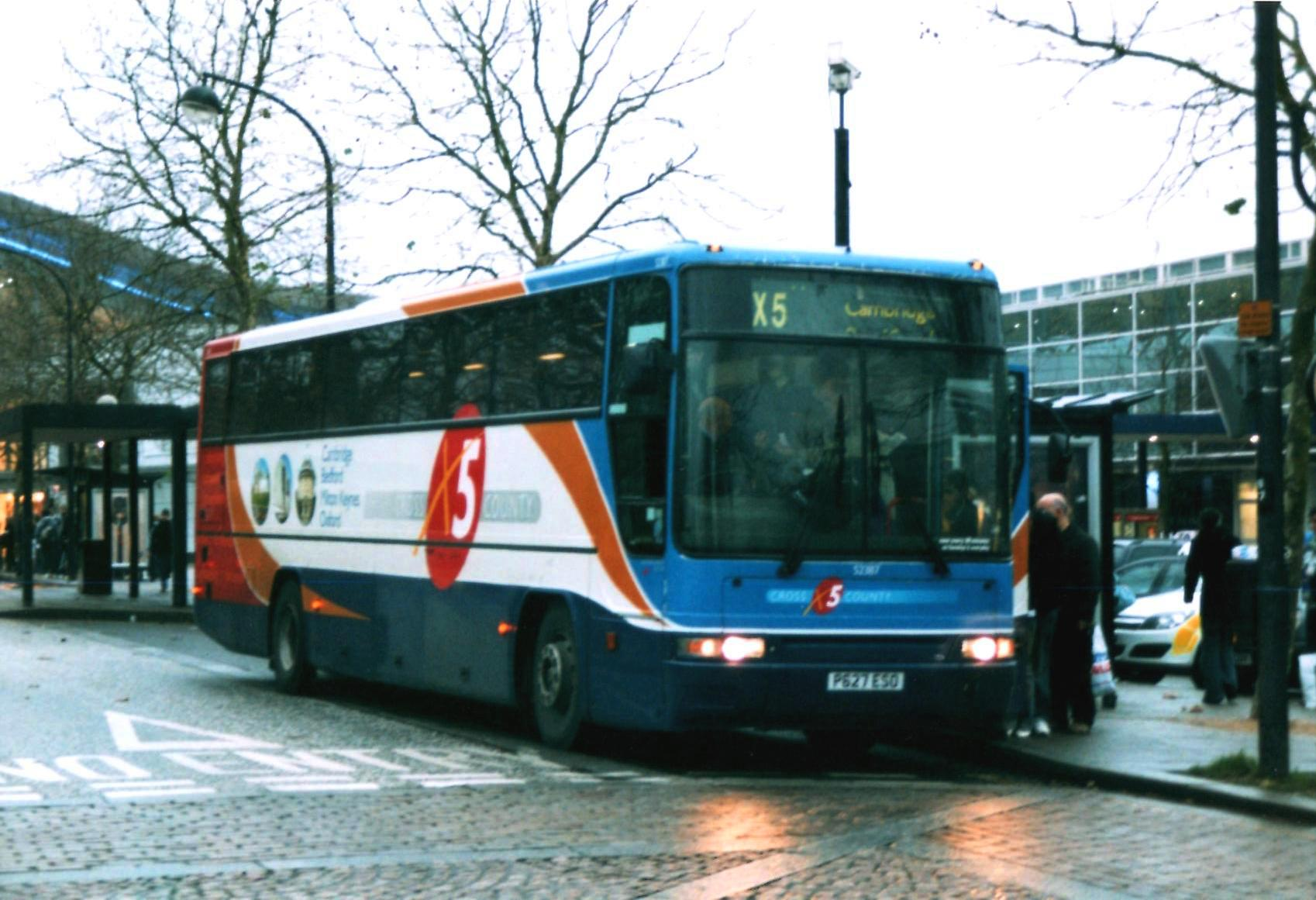
Plaxton Premiere bodied Volvo B10M in Milton Keynes in December 2006

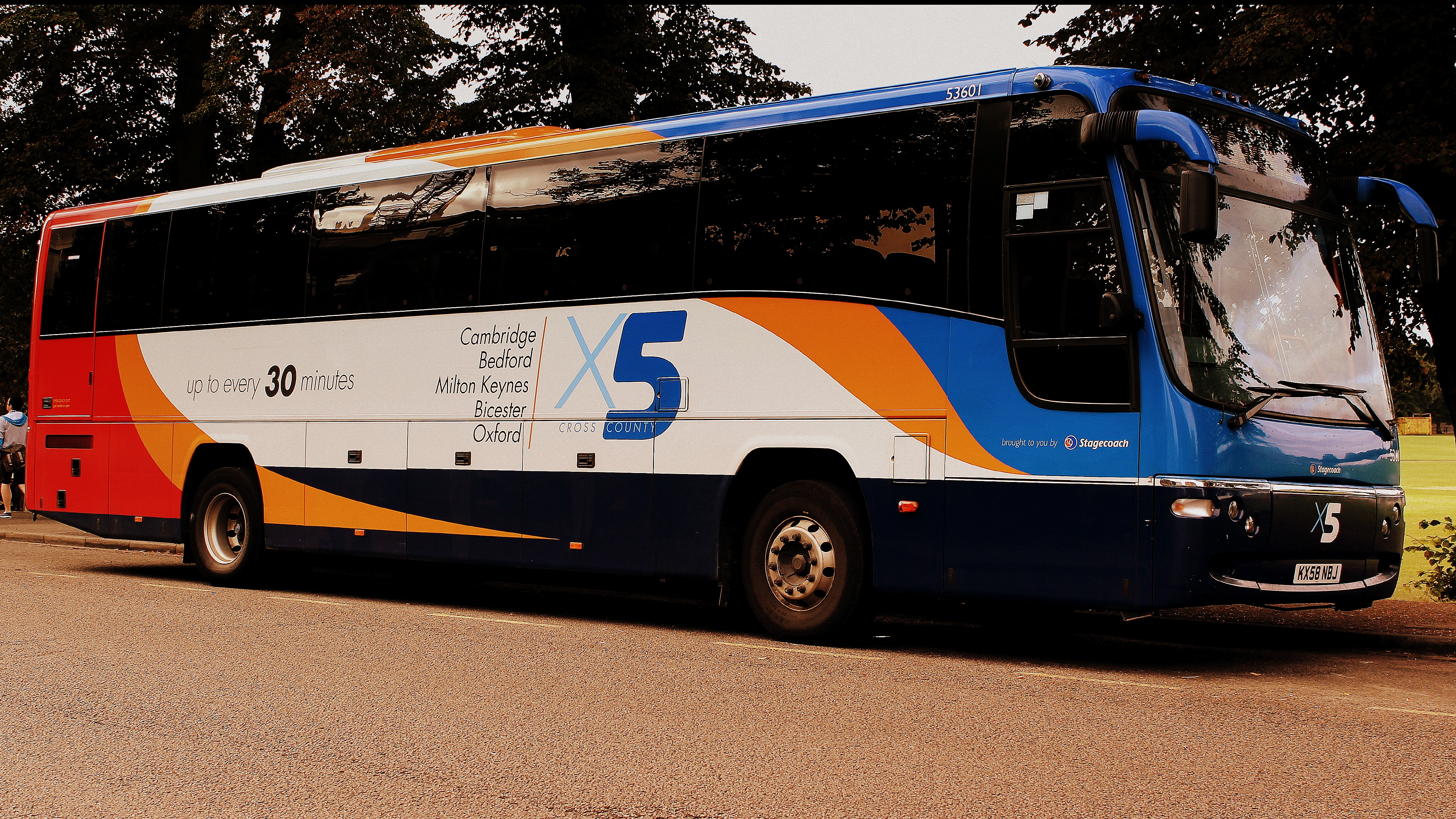
Plaxton Panther bodied Volvo B9R in Cambridge in September 2012

From 1851 to 1967, there was a direct rail service from Oxford to Cambridge with travel time about two hours, known as the Varsity Line. In response to the 1963-65 Beeching cuts, rail service ended in 1966 with no plans for replacement bus, rail, or motorway construction. The former track and railbed was mostly demolished and the railroad right of way sold off. Plans to rebuild the railway as past of the East West Rail projects will cost over £300 million.

In response to the lack of rail service, route X5 was launched in September 1995 with travel time between the two locations taking about 3.5 hours. Buses operated hourly and provided a number of new links between towns which had not previously been connected by bus or rail services. It was initially branded as Varsity, a reference to a pre-World War II service between Oxford and Cambridge via Luton, and to the Varsity Line, a railway route between the university cities closed in 1967. The western part of the route replaced an infrequent Stagecoach United Counties service between Oxford and Bedford. The route was initially operated with by ex Wallace Arnold Plaxton Premiere Volvo B10Ms.

The route remained largely unchanged until August 2004, when it was diverted via Roxton and Wyboston to replace withdrawn local services. Further changes around the same time saw the X5 diverted to serve Eaton Socon and St Neots town centres rather than serving the towns via a stop on the A421 bypass road, thereby adding to the journey time between Bedford and Cambridge. However, evening journeys were sped up by avoiding Eltisley, which was instead covered by another route.

Early in 2005 the X5 was doubled in frequency to operate half-hourly and rebranded as Cross County, a name also used for the (then) X4 service between Milton Keynes and Peterborough. Passenger numbers improved dramatically, with over 500,000 users in 2008. This received some positive feedback, although evening services were criticised for being too infrequent and offering few through journeys.

In 2006 the route briefly faced competition in the form of an air service between the two termini operated by Sky Commuter. This followed an unsuccessful attempt by Alpha One Airways to operate on the corridor.

In April 2007 the route was curtailed within Oxford to terminate at Gloucester Green bus station site and no longer serve the little used final section to Oxford railway station. The changes were in part due to new legal restrictions on maximum driver hours limits.

A modified double-decker bus with extra luggage space was trialled in 2007, with a view to introducing double-deck operation on the route, but was not deemed successful, so the service continued to be operated with high-floor Volvo B10M coaches.

In August 2009 it was reported that some passengers in the St Neots area were being left behind by coaches on the route as they were too full. This problem escalated in December 2009, when higher than expected loadings saw many evening journeys significantly overcrowded. Between 2004 and 2009 patronage increased by 150%. Another name used to promote the service was The X Factor.

The service was slightly rerouted in August 2011 to serve the town centre in Buckingham instead of stopping at the more remote Tesco superstore. Its timetable was also recast, with additional peak-hour journeys introduced. Tesco superstore has since been added back to the route, with the bus stopping at Tesco superstore stop B.

From 30 August 2020, the X5 service was truncated at Bedford, and a new service numbered 905 was introduced running between Bedford and Cambridge using double-deck vehicles. The timetable for both the X5 and the 905 is designed so an easy transfer is possible for customers changing for St Neots/Cambridge or Milton Keynes/Buckingham/Oxford.

In 2021, the coaches on the route were swapped for Alexander Dennis Enviro400 MMC double-decker buses.

== Route ==
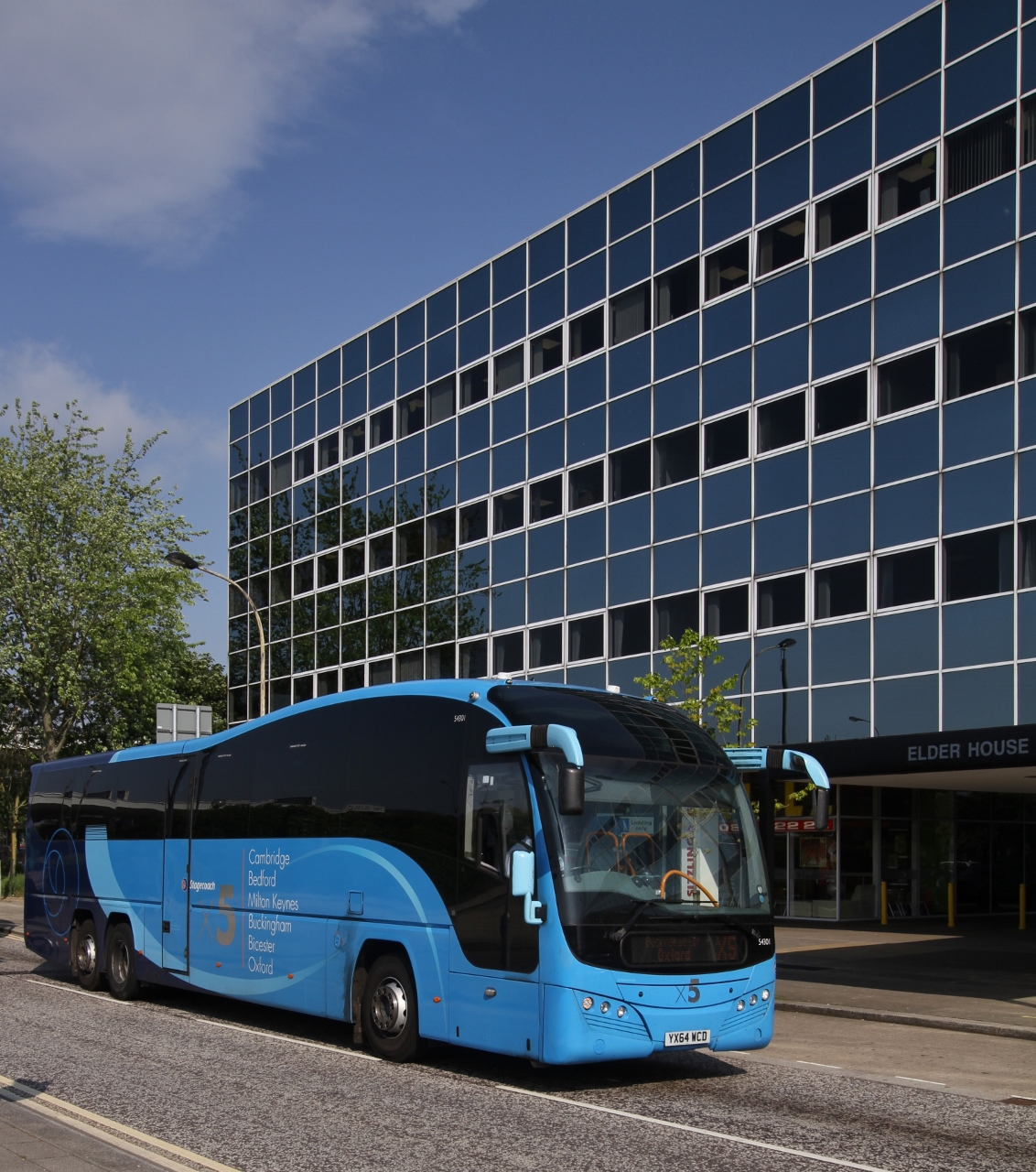
Plaxton Elite bodied Volvo B11R in Station Square, Milton Keynes in May 2018

The X5/905 connects Oxford and Cambridge via Bicester, Buckingham, Milton Keynes, Bedford (where through passengers have to change to the 905) and St Neots. It provides interchange facilities for national north–south services at Milton Keynes by serving Milton Keynes Coachway and Milton Keynes Central railway station.

The route is 85 miles (137 km) long, and largely follows the path of the notional Oxford-Cambridge Arc. The eastbound service commences at Oxford's Gloucester Green bus station. It then heads for Bicester, stopping near Bicester shopping village and Manorsfield Road in Bicester town centre. The route calls at Bicester North railway station (added to the route in 2008), then moves on to the Tesco superstore in Buckingham, followed by the town centre, before heading for Milton Keynes.

In Milton Keynes, the service stops at the Milton Keynes Central railway station to interchange with rail services on the West Coast Main Line, the X6 to Northampton, and route MK1 to Luton Airport; at Milton Keynes Shopping Centre; and at the Milton Keynes Coachway where it interconnects with National Express north-south services. The route continues to the Bedford bus station, where drivers change over. Thereafter passengers for stops towards Cambridge change on to service 905 which diverts through Eaton Socon where it picks up a number of passengers before its next stop in St Neots and then on towards Cambridge. Entering the outskirts of Cambridge, it serves the West Cambridge campus on Madingley Road before reaching its terminus at the Drummer Street bus station.

The service is part of Stagecoach's Megabus network. It is also marketed as a rail link service, and appears in the National Rail timetable.

== Vehicles ==
In 2009, a fleet of 17 Plaxton Panther bodied Volvo B9Rs were introduced onto the service. These in turn were replaced on 4 January 2015 by 18 Plaxton Elite bodied Volvo B11Rs painted in a new blue colour scheme, with a sky blue towards the front of the coach and a navy blue containing outlines of Stagecoach's logo in sky blue towards the rear. These were replaced by higher capacity Alexander Dennis Enviro400 MMC double deck buses in 2021 as noted previously.

== Awards ==
Following the 2008 relaunch the route won two industry awards. The first came at the 2009 UK Bus Awards, where the route won the Express Operation of the Year award by a unanimous decision. A year later, the route won the Coach Marketing award at the 2010 UK Coach Awards for a promotion effort by Stagecoach.

== Trivia ==
X5, a costing and pricing system used by both Oxford University and Cambridge University to cost externally funded research projects, was named after the bus route connecting the two cities.
