= Milton Keynes Coachway =

Bus station in Milton Keynes, England

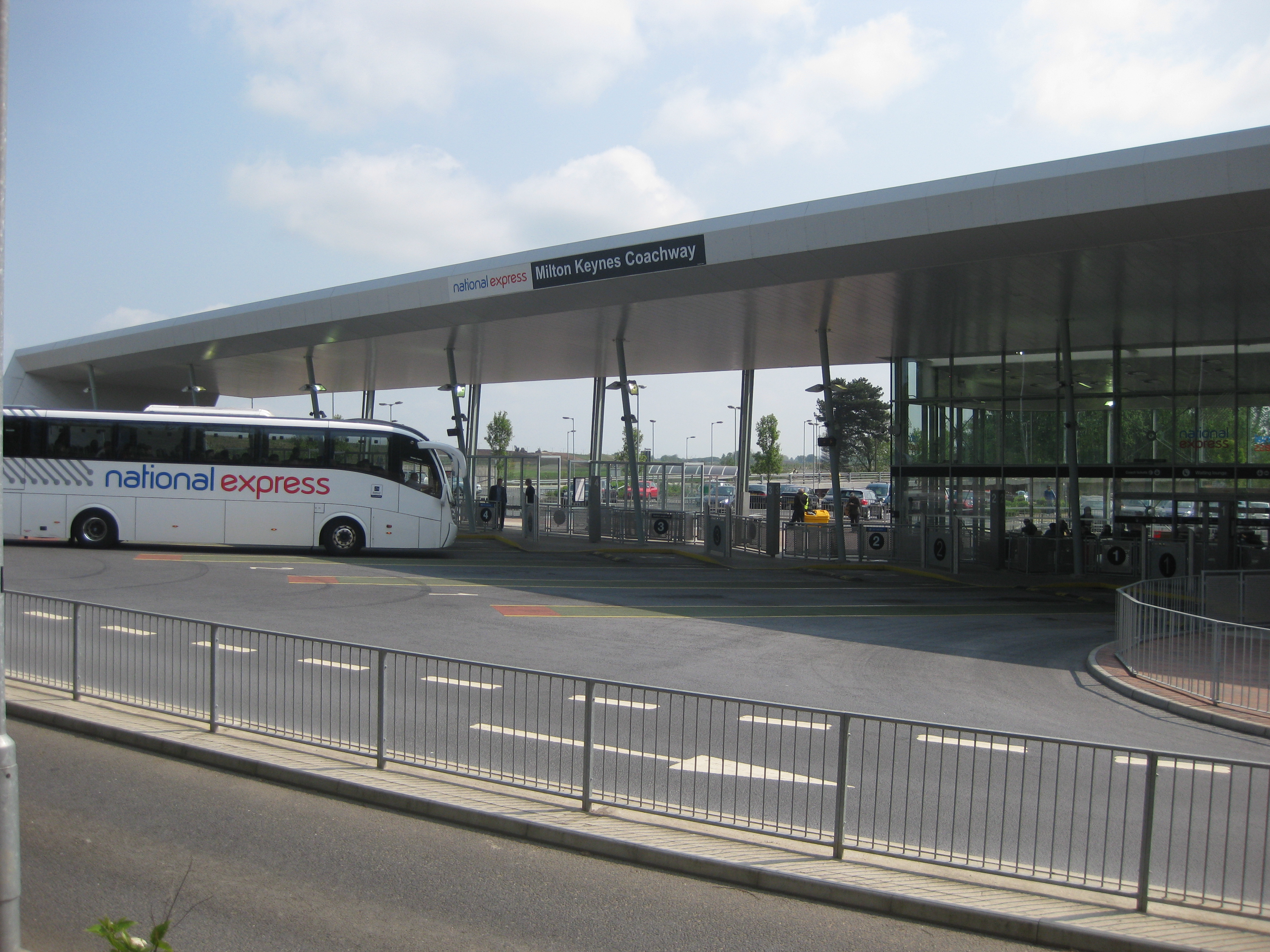

General information
- Location: Newport Road, Broughton, MK16 0AA (near M1 junction 14); Milton Keynes; England
- Coordinates: 52.0555°N 0.6990°W
- Operator: National Express
- Bus routes: Multiple destinations by National Express coaches. Stagecoach X5 (Oxford–Bedford)
- Bus stands: 7 for coaches, 2 for buses
- Bus operators: Arriva Shires & Essex; National Express; Stagecoach East
- Connections: Local bus route 3, Stagecoach X5 and C1 Cranfield Connect services terminate at Milton Keynes Central railway station via Central Milton Keynes

Construction
- Parking: Adjacent park and ride site
- Cycle facilities: The Coachway is connected to the Milton Keynes redway system of cycle/ pedestrian routes.
- Accessible: All access routes are wheelchair-friendly.

Key dates
- 1989: opened
- 2008: closed for demolition and rebuild
- 2010: new building opened
Location

The Milton Keynes Coachway (also Milton Keynes coach station) is a Coachway interchange close to junction 14 of the M1 motorway on the eastern edge of Milton Keynes, north Buckinghamshire, England. It supports National Express intercity coach services to cities, towns and airports on the M1 (and the roads that it connects to), and on into Scotland, to Heathrow, Gatwick, Stansted and Luton Airports, as well as Stagecoach East's route X5 between Oxford and Bedford, and interchange between these services. There are also local bus services and nearby, a park and ride site. It is the second busiest coach station in the United Kingdom. Dating from 1989, it was the first of the UK's Coachway interchanges.

== History ==
There has been a coach interchange at M1 Junction 14 since April 1989, constructed by Buckinghamshire County Council (as the then highway authority). By the early 2000s, the original building had become worn out and plans were begun to replace it with a new building, with funding support from the government.

In 2006 works were carried out on this junction – to widen the slip roads, to install new traffic signals, to create a dedicated left-turn lane from the A509 to the northbound M1, to widen the southbound A509 to three lanes between J14 and Northfield roundabout, and to create a new access road from the A5130 to the (then) proposed new 500 space park-and-ride site. This work was in advance of the planned re-development of the coachway and park and ride site.

Plans for the new coachway were released in April 2008 and services were moved on a temporary basis to Silbury Boulevard. At that time it was expected that work would be completed by spring 2009. Facilities at the temporary site included a waiting room, café, ticket office, toilets, a shop with taxi booking facilities and approximately 60 adjacent parking spaces with CCTV and 24-hour on-site security. All local services along this section of Silbury Boulevard stopped at the temporary coachway.

In March 2009 it was announced that work would be delayed, with completion expected in 'spring/summer 2010' due to higher than expected tender prices requiring the council to source a further £600,000. Construction was managed by Milton Keynes Council until it was passed to the Homes and Communities Agency in September 2010. Work on the structure was underway by October 2009 when the steel frame could be seen from the motorway. The final fitting out was undertaken by National Express who operate the station on behalf of the council and the agency.

The new interchange opened on 13 December 2010. The cost of the project was £2.6 million funded by the Milton Keynes Partnership and the Growth Area Fund via the Department for Transport.

== Facilities ==
The coach station building has a café, a shop, toilets, cycle racks and facilities to book taxis and National Express Coaches. Near-real-time status screens show arrivals and departures for National Express services. Other operators' services are not shown.

The building and access to it are wheelchair-friendly by design. National Express services are announced but those of other operators are not.

== Service summary ==
As of September 2020, these are the routes that call at the coachway:

National Express: East Midlands to Heathrow and Gatwick Airports; Newcastle, Darlington and Leeds to London (Victoria); Sunderland, Middlesbrough, York and Leeds to London; Derbyshire and Leicestershire to London; Mansfield and Nottingham to London; Northampton and Milton Keynes to London; Lancashire and Manchester to London; Liverpool via Stoke-On-Trent to London; Huddersfield and Sheffield to London; Bradford and Leeds to London; Scarborough, York, Hull and Doncaster to London; The Lake District and Blackpool to Birmingham and London; Inverness, Aberdeen, Glasgow and Carlisle to London; Edinburgh to London and Heathrow Airport; Blackpool, Birmingham, London; Stansted, Luton, Heathrow and Gatwick airports.

Stagecoach: Oxford, Bicester, Bedford.

== See also ==
- Buses in Milton Keynes
- (Former) Milton Keynes central bus station
- Other coachways in the UK
