= Stagecoach East =

Bus operator in the East of England

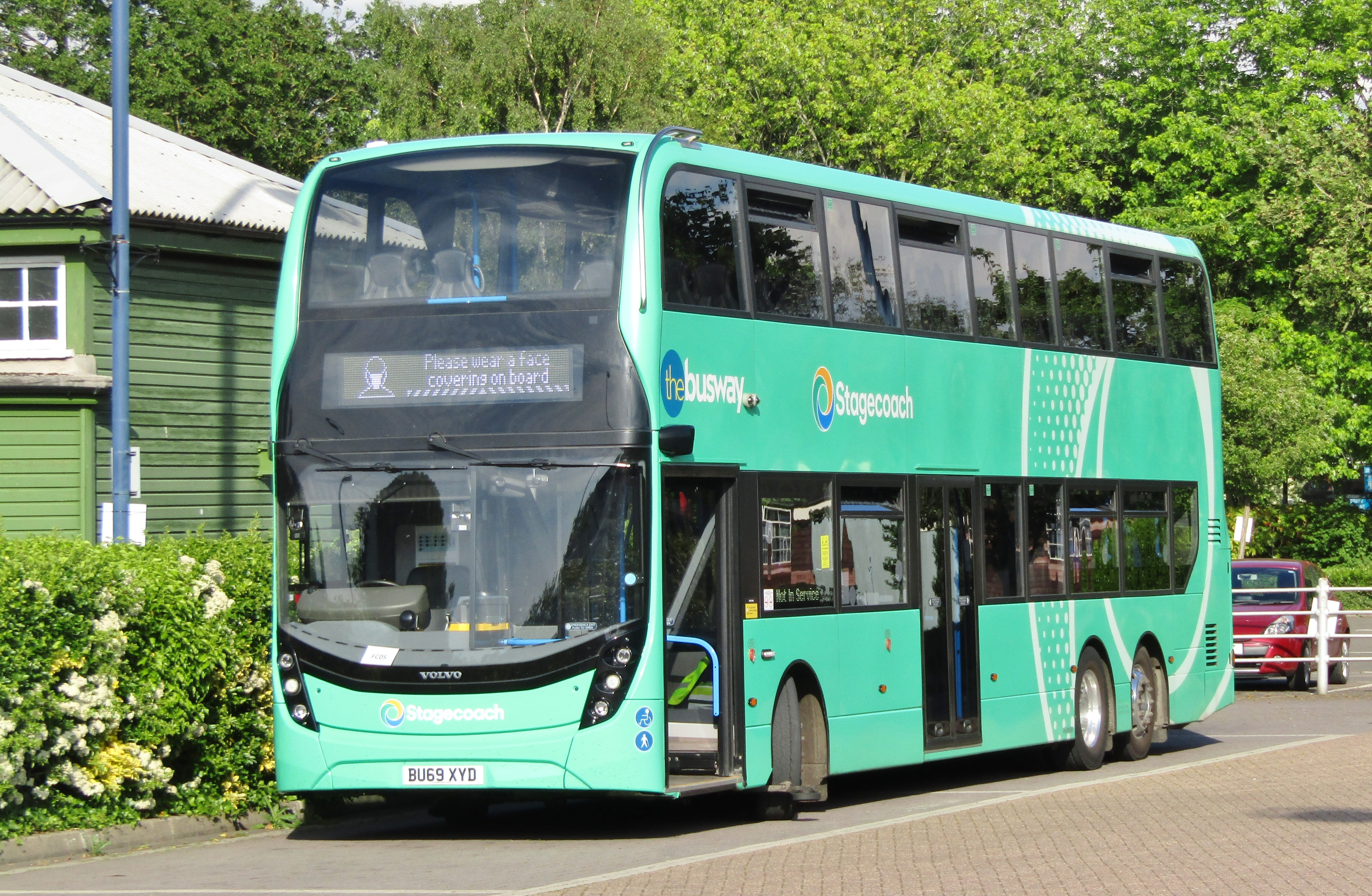
- Stagecoach East Alexander Dennis Enviro400 XLB bodied Volvo B8L at St Ives bus station, June 2021
- Parent: Stagecoach Group
- Founded: 6 December 1995
- Headquarters: Cambridge
- Service area: Bedfordshire; Cambridgeshire
- Service type: Public bus
- Depots: 5
- Fleet: 333 (April 2023)
- Website: Official website

Cambus Limited trading under the names of Stagecoach East, Stagecoach in Cambridge, Stagecoach in Peterborough, Stagecoach in Huntingdonshire and Stagecoach in Bedford is a bus operator providing local and regional services across the East of England, operating in the counties of Bedfordshire and Cambridgeshire. The company is a subsidiary of the Stagecoach Group and is headquartered and registered in Cambridge.

== History ==
Under the control of the National Bus Company, Cambus Ltd. was set up when the Eastern Counties Omnibus Company was split in preparation for privatisation. The company was incorporated on 8 June 1984; it took over Eastern Counties' bus and National Express coach operations from garages in Cambridgeshire and parts of Suffolk (Newmarket and Haverhill) on 9 September 1984. On 5 December 1986, Cambus was sold to its management team in a management buyout.

In December 1988, Cambus Holdings acquired most of the bus and coach operations of Cambridge-based Premier Travel Services, with the exception being the Cambridge–London Airports coach services, which remained with the AJS Group as part of the new Cambridge Coach Services operation. A reorganisation of the acquired operator followed in May 1990, with all coach operations (including National Express contracts) being transferred to Premier Travel, and Premier Travel's bus routes being transferred to Cambus. In September 1989, Cambus's Peterborough operations were split off to form The Viscount Bus and Coach Company Ltd.

In February 1992, Cambus Holdings bought Millers Coaches of Foxton from its owner, Bernard Miller, on his retirement. Millers Coaches had been competing with Cambus on a number of bus routes, using the Millerbus name, and this operation became a new Millerbus Ltd. subsidiary, under the direct control of the Cambus management; the operation lasted for about three years before being absorbed into its parent. Meanwhile, Millers Coaches itself was placed under the control of Premier Travel, although the name was retained (and both companies adopted liveries using different colours applied in the same style). By the autumn of 1995, however, the operations of Premier Travel and Millers Coaches had been absorbed into the main Cambus company, although the Premier Travel name survived in use with Cambus a few years longer.

On 25 November 1992, Cambus Holdings expanded in Buckinghamshire, with the purchase of Generalouter Ltd., the holding company of Milton Keynes City Bus and Buckinghamshire Road Car - offshoots of former National Bus Company subsidiary United Counties.

Cambus Holdings was sold to Stagecoach Holdings for £12.6 million on 6 December 1995, with Stagecoach agreeing to purchase 3,168,560 employee shares in Cambus for £3.50 each. The company was rebranded as Stagecoach Cambus before ultimately becoming the Stagecoach East division. However, following a report by the Monopolies and Mergers Commission, Stagecoach was required to divest itself of its Milton Keynes and Buckinghamshire operations, as well as United Counties' Huntingdon garage. In late 1997, new company MK Metro took over the Milton Keynes operations while Premier Buses took over the Huntingdon operation, both independent from Stagecoach.

On 30 January 1998, the Huntingdon operation was sold to Sovereign Bus & Coach, owned by Blazefield Holdings who decided to rebrand it to Huntingdon & District. In November 2003 the operations were sold again from Blazefield to Cavalier Contracts of Long Sutton, Lincolnshire. The operations were acquired by Stagecoach on Monday 31 March 2008 when Cavalier Travel sold their interests in bus services of over 9 seats. At the date of sale operations were branded under the names Cavalier Travel and Huntingdon & District. In August 2010, the Stagecoach in Northants operation was transferred from Stagecoach East to Stagecoach Midlands, with Stagecoach East retaining four depots at Bedford, Cambridge, Fenstanton and Peterborough following this reorganisation.

Stagecoach East expanded into Norfolk and southern Lincolnshire in December 2013 with the acquisition of Norfolk Green, based in King's Lynn with a fleet of 70 buses, following the retirement of its owner due to ill health. The Norfolk Green brand was retained by Stagecoach for up to two years before Stagecoach began rebranding buses into standard fleet livery from 2015 onwards. In April 2018, however, Stagecoach East closed its King's Lynn depot and withdrew from operations in Norfolk and south Lincolnshire after the operation was deemed not economically viable; Stagecoach East would return to operations exclusively in Bedfordshire and Cambridgeshire with the transfer of its Long Sutton outstation to Stagecoach East Midlands in October 2019.

== Services ==
As of 2021, Stagecoach East uses the brand names Stagecoach in Bedford for the former United Counties Omnibus Company operations in Bedfordshire, Stagecoach in Cambridge for the former Cambus operations in Cambridgeshire, Stagecoach in Peterborough for the former Viscount operations and Stagecoach in the Fens for the former Huntingdon & District operations.

=== Cambridgeshire Guided Busway ===
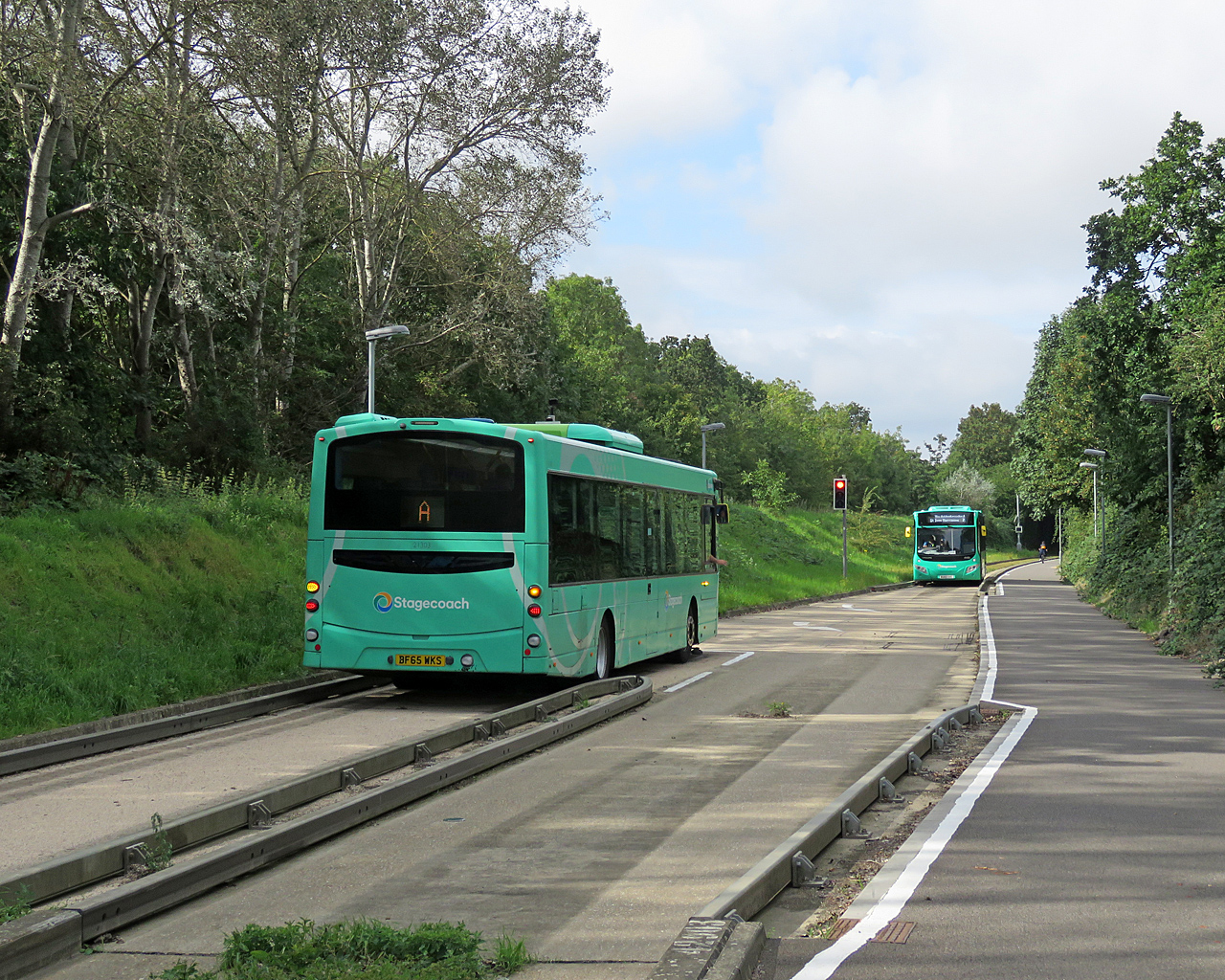
Two Stagecoach East single-deck buses operating on the Cambridgeshire Guided Busway in August 2023

Stagecoach East are one of the two bus companies operating services on the 16 mi (26 km) Cambridgeshire Guided Busway, the longest guided busway in the world, with the other operator being Ascendal Group subsidiary Whippet Coaches. When the Busway opened in 2011, following two years of delays, Stagecoach East operated a fleet of Alexander Dennis Enviro400 bodied Scania N230UD double deckers and Wright Eclipse 2 bodied Volvo B7RLE single decker buses, purchased for £3 million and equipped with specialist equipment for use on the Busway.

As of August 2025, Stagecoach East operate two routes on the Cambridgeshire Guided Busway, these being routes A and B serving Cambridge, Huntingdon, St Ives and Trumpington, among other destinations. Double-deckers are operated only on the northern portion of the Busway due to the presence of low railway bridges along the section south of Cambridge railway station. These double-deckers are both in the form of Alexander Dennis Enviro400 bodied Scania N230UDs as well as Alexander Dennis Enviro400 XLB bodied Volvo B8L tri-axle buses, while single-deckers used on the service consist of Wright Eclipse 2 and MCV Evora bodied Volvo B8RLEs.

=== Cambridge Park and Ride ===
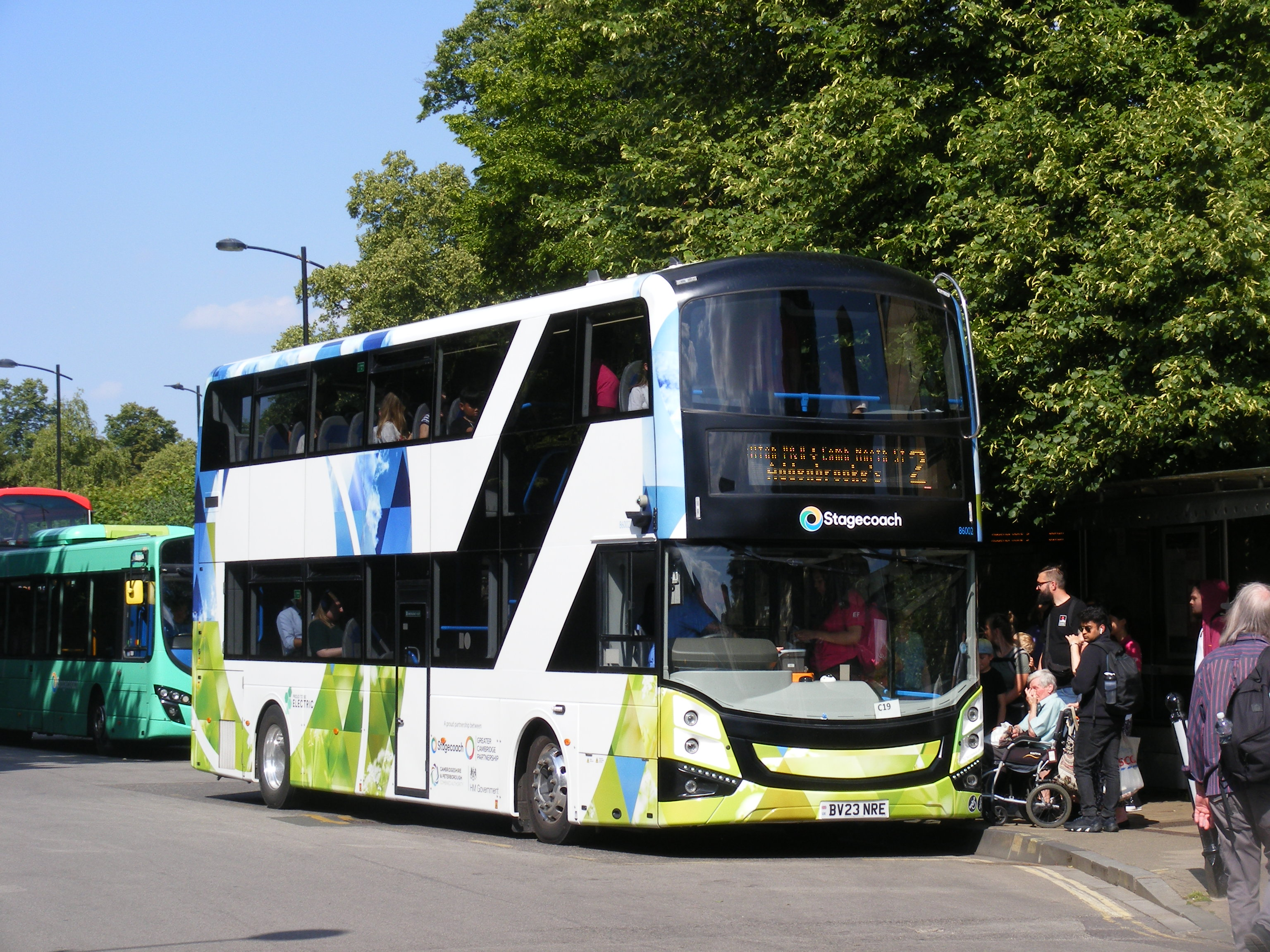
MCV double-decker-bodied Volvo BZL DD operating on the Cambridge Park and Ride in July 2023

Stagecoach East are the operator of the Cambridge park and ride network, operating five services on contract from Cambridgeshire County Council from five colour-coded sites at Babraham Road, Madingley Road, Milton, Newmarket Road and Trumpington. The network, first introduced in 1996 with the opening of Madingley Road park and ride site, operates seven days a week using a fleet of 30 MCV bodied Volvo BZL double-decker battery electric buses, which were introduced to the service in May 2023.

Prior to 2017, Stagecoach East's operation of the Cambridge Park and Ride network consisted of three colour-branded services operating across Cambridge via the city centre, making use of dual-door Alexander Dennis Enviro400 double-decker buses delivered new in 2007. Alongside the launch of new colour-branded Alexander Dennis Enviro400 MMC buses for the network, the Cambridge Park and Ride network was revised in January 2017 to introduce five colour-coded routes which served only one park and ride site and terminated within the city centre.

=== X5 and 905 ===
Introduced in its original form in 1992, the X5 service is operated by Stagecoach East at a 30-minute frequency between Bedford and Oxford via Milton Keynes, Buckingham and Bicester, making use of Alexander Dennis Enviro400 MMC double-deckers. Before double-deckers were introduced, the X5 service ran through to Cambridge using Plaxton Elite bodied Volvo B11R coaches; in late August 2020, supported by the Cambridgeshire and Peterborough Combined Authority, the Cambridge leg of the service was split into a separate 905 route serving Bedford and Cambridge. The Enviro400 MMC double-deckers were subsequently introduced onto the X5 in October 2021.

=== 'TING' trial ===
In October 2021, in cooperation with the Cambridgeshire and Peterborough Combined Authority and technology provider Via, Stagecoach East began trial operation of the 'TING' demand-responsive transport system in west Huntingdonshire. The service, operated by Fenstanton Depot, made use of buses that were not restricted to a timetable and bookable through a smartphone app at a flat fare of £2. The trial period was extended to June 2022 shortly after its launch, and by the time the service was handed over to Vectare Buses in November 2022, the service had served around 31,000 passengers and travelled 401,686 miles, additionally transporting passengers to music festivals and other area events.

== See also ==
- List of bus operators of the United Kingdom
- Milton Keynes Coachway
