= Milton Keynes Central railway station =

Railway station in Buckinghamshire, England

Milton Keynes Central
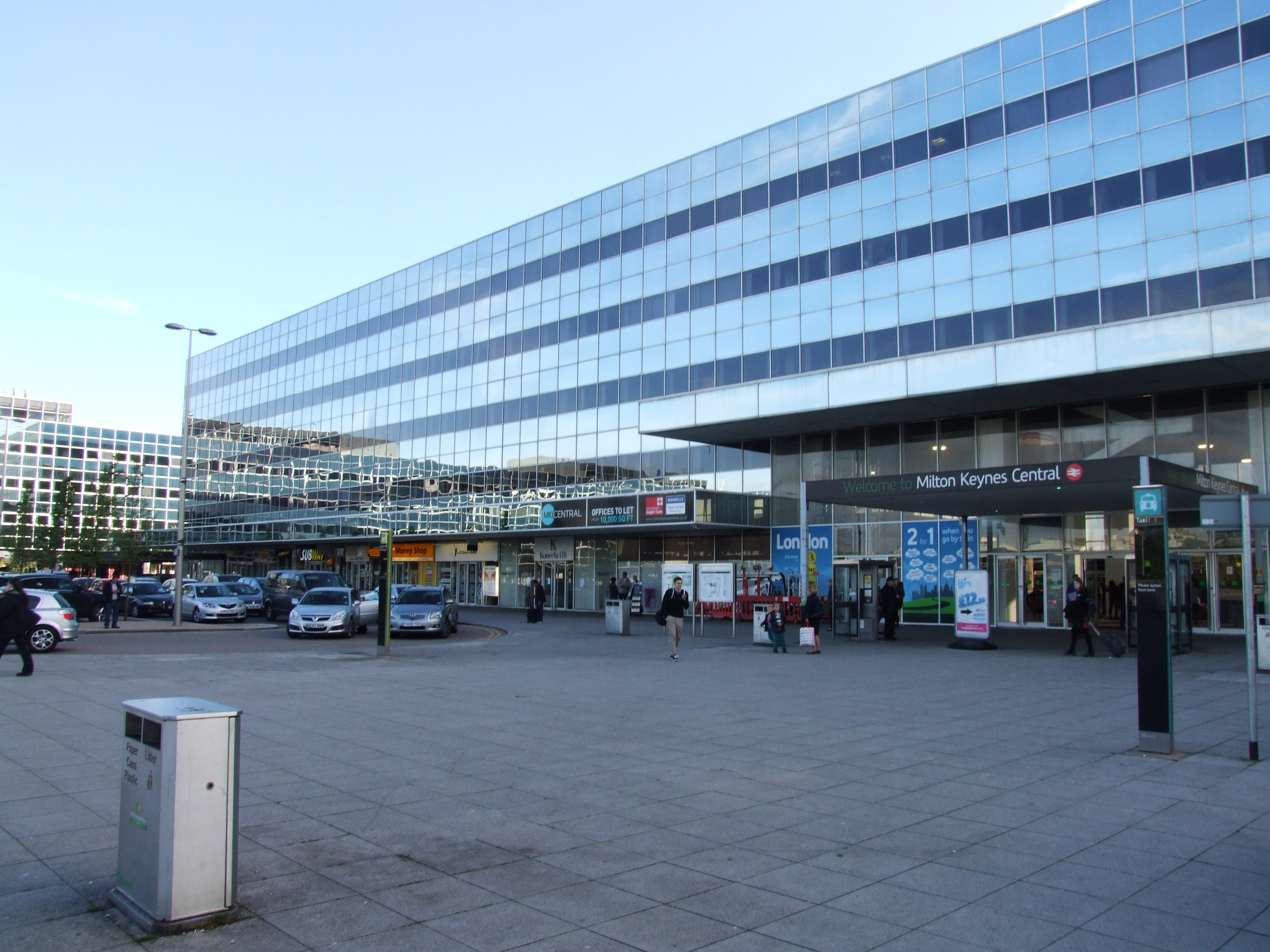
- Station Square, showing the frontage to Milton Keynes Central.

General information
- Location: 302 Elder Gate, Milton Keynes, MK9 1LA; England
- Coordinates: 52.0340°N 0.7747°W
- Grid reference: SP841379
- Owner: Network Rail
- Manager: London Northwestern Railway
- Line: West Coast Main Line
- Platforms: 7 (numbered 1–2, 2A, 3–6)

Construction
- Accessible: Lifts to platforms, step up to trains

Other information
- Station code: MKC
- Classification: DfT category B

History
- Original company: British Rail

Key dates
- 17 May 1982: Opened
- 29 December 2008: Platforms 2A and 6 added

Passengers
- 2021/22: ▲4.239 million
- Interchange: ▲0.227 million
- 2022/23: ▲4.510 million
- Interchange: ▼0.190 million
- 2023/24: ▲5.559 million
- Interchange: ▲0.219 million
- 2024/25: ▲6.100 million
- Interchange: ▲0.241 million
- 2025/26: ▲6.425 million
- Interchange: ▲0.272 million
Location
Notes
- Passenger statistics from the Office of Rail and Road

Milton Keynes Central railway station serves the city of Milton Keynes, in Buckinghamshire, England. It is a stop on the West Coast Main Line, about 50 miles (80 km) north-west of London. The station is served by Avanti West Coast inter-city services and by West Midlands Trains regional services. This is the principal station for the city, one of seven serving its urban area. (Note: The others are Wolverton (in north-west Milton Keynes), Bletchley (south-west), Fenny Stratford (also south-west), Bow Brickhill (south-east), Woburn Sands and Aspley Guise (both in the far south-east of the built-up area).) It was opened on 17 May 1982.

== History and development ==
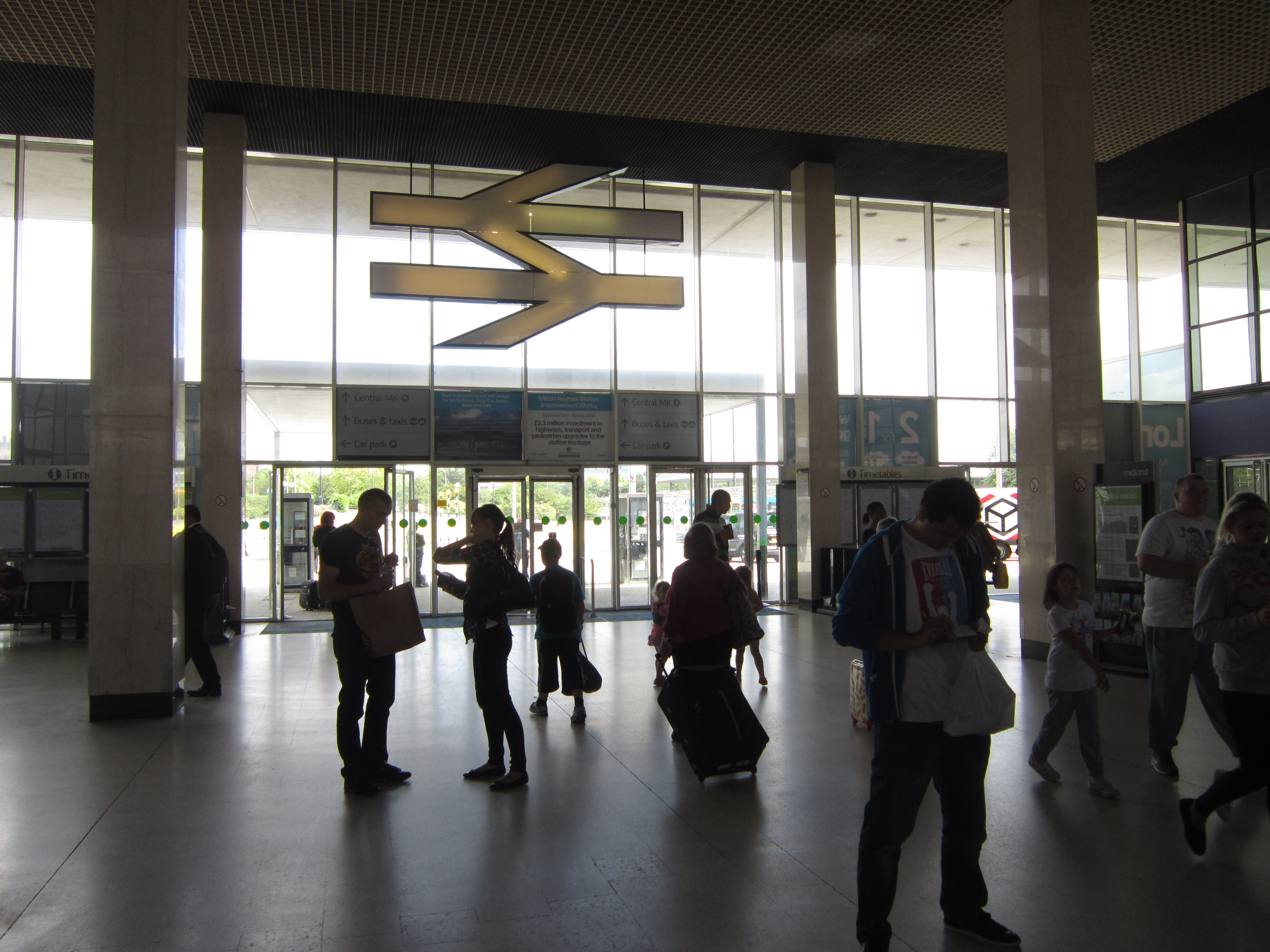
The station lobby, with the National Rail logo above the entrance

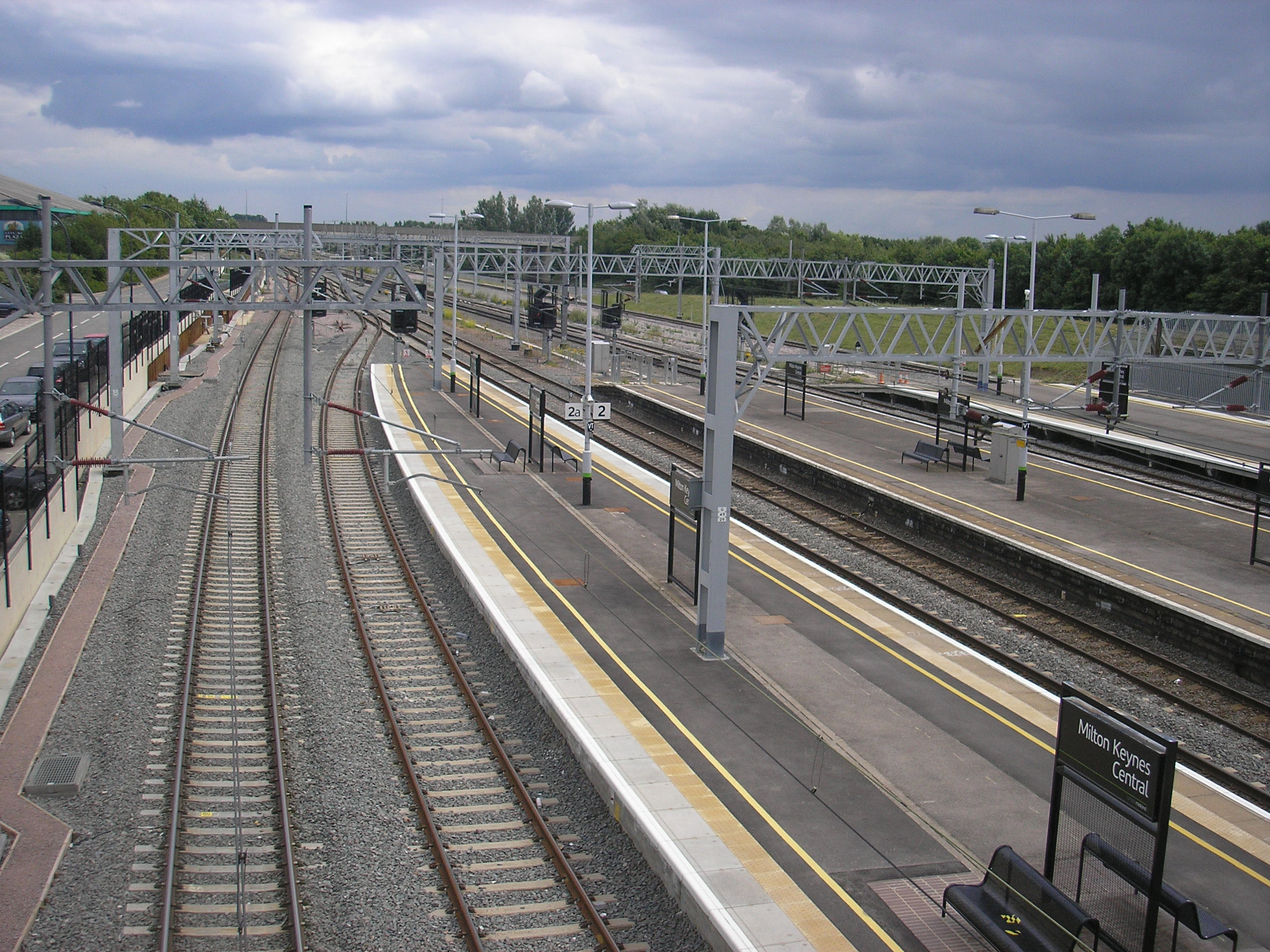
Southbound view with bay platform 2A

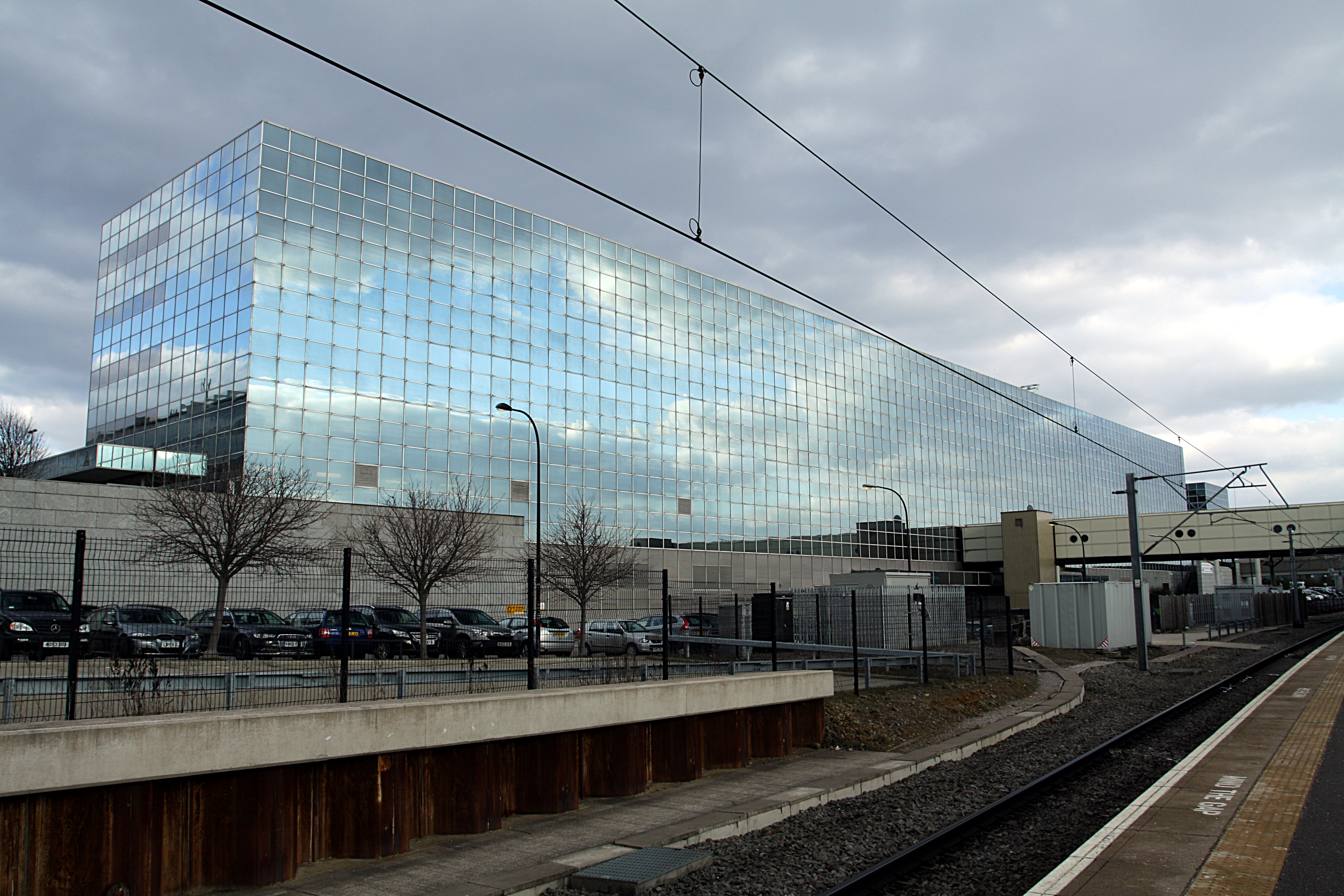
The main building of the station from platform 1

=== A new station for Milton Keynes ===
A new station to delimit the western end of the new central business district of Milton Keynes was a key objective for Milton Keynes Development Corporation (MKDC). In the cash-strapped circumstances of the 1960s and 1970s, British Rail (BR) was unenthusiastic but eventually came round after a deal was done in 1978 on cost sharing. In 1979, MKDC architect Stuart Mosscrop designed the station building and office blocks to either side, framing a new Station Square and the vista uphill along Midsummer Boulevard (and the midsummer sunrise). (Note: When seen uphill along Midsummer Boulevard from Midsummer Roundabout near the station. For more details, see Central Milton Keynes#Astronomical alignment.)

=== Opening ===
The station opened on 14 May 1982, with an official opening by Charles, then-Prince of Wales conducted three days later. The adjacent office wings were completed three years later. Before Milton Keynes Central opened, Bletchley was the main station for Milton Keynes, served by InterCity services. These services moved to the new station, downgrading Bletchley.

=== 2006–08 developments ===
In May 2006, the Department of Transport announced a plan to upgrade the station. The first phase added a down fast line platform 6, so that the existing platform 5 could be used for stopping express trains in either direction. The second phase provided an additional terminating bay platform (2A), nominally to extend the Marston Vale Line (Bedford – Bletchley) service via the West Coast Main Line (WCML) to Milton Keynes Central. This 5-car bay platform is indented into platform 1. The original bay platform 1 line was extended northwards to become a through platform (becoming the up slow line), and platform 2 line is now a terminating and reversing line, avoiding conflicting crossing movements. This work was completed on 29 December 2008. As of August 2023, a direct service between Bedford and Milton Keynes Central is not in any published plan, being overtaken by later events (see § Chiltern Railways (East West Rail), below).

== Platforms and layout ==
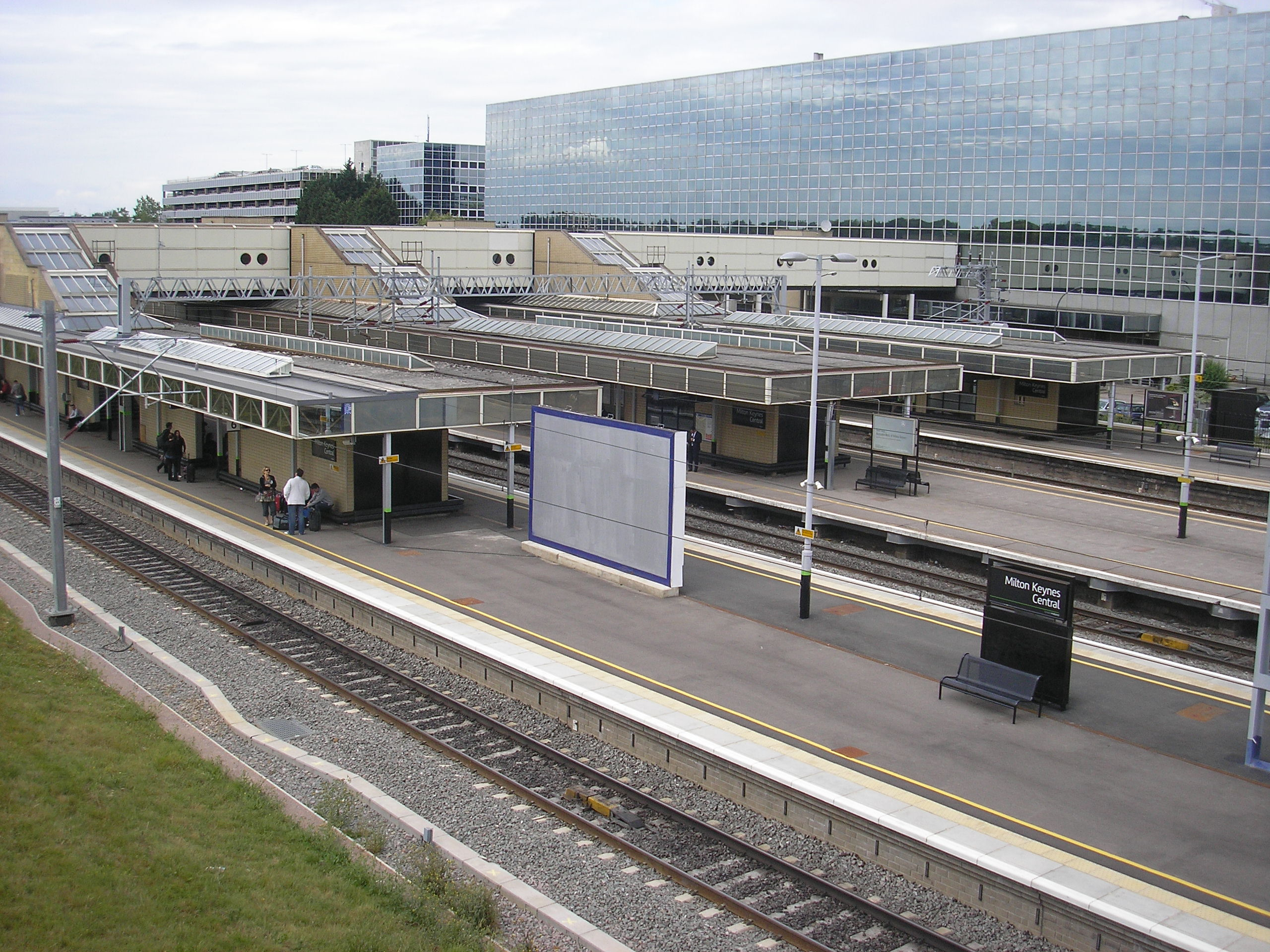
North-west facing view, with platform 6 in the foreground

Milton Keynes Central has a total of seven platforms. Platforms 1 and 3 are the south and northbound slow platforms, while 4 and 6 are the south and northbound fast platforms. Platforms 2 and 5 are reversible, being slow and fast respectively. Platform 2 is used mainly by terminating stopping services from London Euston, whilst platforms 1 and 3 are used by West Midlands Trains services between Euston and Northampton, Birmingham New Street or Crewe. Platforms 4, 5 and 6 are used by Avanti West Coast inter-city express services between London and the West Midlands, north Wales, the north-west and Scotland.

Platform 2A is a five-car south-facing bay platform, originally intended for the extension of Marston Vale Line services from Bedford into Milton Keynes Central: this proposal no longer appears in plans for East West Rail, being replaced by a planned service to/from Oxford (see below). Meanwhile, platform 2A is used only by exception when additional platform capacity is needed, such as when there is a service delay. To the north of the station, the six lines reduce to four (two slow and two fast) and there is a mile of five-track running to the south before this also reduces back to four.

The station is generally accessible; there are no unavoidable steps and there are lifts from the concourse to each platform. As with all main line railway stations, passengers with mobility limitations may need to pre-book assistance to get from the platform to the train. Ticket gates are in operation.

== Transport interchange ==
The station forecourt is the terminus or key intermediate destination for many bus services; almost all local and district bus services stop there. These services are operated mostly by Arriva Shires & Essex as well as some routes by Stagecoach East and a number of independent operators. Numerous bus services each hour traverse Midsummer Boulevard, connecting the station to the shopping centre, the theatre and Xscape.

Bus services from the station also provide connections to Dunstable, Luton and Luton Airport, via the Luton to Dunstable Busway. Stagecoach East operates four major long-distance bus routes from Milton Keynes Central. Their route MK1 express service runs to Luton Airport via Luton railway station, providing a direct link between the West Coast Main Line and the Midland Main Line. Route X5 route between Oxford and Bedford stops here, as does their X6 service to Northampton, with connections to Leicester and Peterborough. Arriva Shires & Essex also operate route X6 (formerly the X60) to Aylesbury via Buckingham. (National Express services run from the Milton Keynes Coachway, about 4.5 miles (7.2 km) away, served from this station by the 3 or the X5.)

== Local facilities ==
The station building has a shop, with others and restaurants on the south side of the station square. There are a number of hotels on Midsummer Boulevard, which begins opposite the station and leads up into the central business district.

The Milton Keynes redway system, a comprehensive network of cycle/pedestrian shared use paths, connects to the station and its bicycle parking facilities.

Also in the station forecourt is a taxi rank and a pick-up space for private hire cars, plus limited short term parking. There are multi-storey car-parks to the north and south of the station. Parking in the surrounding streets is heavily restricted to discourage commuter parking.

The station square itself is a favourite site for skateboarding and freestyle BMX and, as a result, the granite facings of the planting surrounds have suffered from the continuous bumping and grinding. This has lessened somewhat since the opening of a dedicated skateboarding park (Sk8 MK) close to the former central bus station.

== Services ==
=== Current services ===
==== London Northwestern ====
Milton Keynes Central is a principal start and terminus for London Northwestern Railway (LNR) services to/from London Euston; it is a major stop on others terminating/initiating at Northampton, Crewe or Birmingham New Street. The typical off-peak service in trains per hour (tph):

- 1 tph to Crewe, via Rugby and Stafford
- 2 tph to Birmingham New Street, via Northampton and Coventry
- 5 tph to London Euston.

==== Avanti West Coast ====
Many Avanti West Coast inter-city services call here, with three calls an hour in each direction off-peak on weekdays in trains per hour (tph):

- 3 tph to London Euston
- 1 tph to Liverpool Lime Street, via Crewe and Runcorn
- 1 tph to Manchester Piccadilly, via Stoke-on-Trent
- 1 tph to Birmingham New Street, via Coventry

==== Lumo ====
The service between London Euston and Stirling operated by Lumo (an open-access operator owned by FirstGroup) calls here.

=== Future services ===
==== Chiltern Railways (East West Rail) ====
In March 2025, Chiltern Railways announced that it had been appointed to operate passenger services on East West Rail between Oxford and Milton Keynes Central, via Oxford Parkway, Bicester Village, Winslow (newly constructed) and Bletchley. It expected the service to become operational by late 2025, but a dispute with the rail unions (over a proposal for driver-only operation) continues to prevent commencement of the service.

=== Former services ===
==== Connex South Central ====
In June 1997, Connex South Central began operating services between Gatwick Airport and Rugby, via the Brighton Main Line and West London Line. It was cut back to terminate at Milton Keynes in December 2000, before being withdrawn in May 2002 due to capacity constraints on the WCML while the latter was being upgraded.

==== Southern ====
Southern reintroduced the London orbital route service in February 2009, initially operating between Brighton and Milton Keynes Central; this was before being curtailed at its southern end to terminate at South Croydon and later at Clapham Junction. In May 2022, Southern cut its service back to terminate at Watford Junction, where passengers for stations north of Watford might transfer to Avanti West Coast or London Northwestern Railway services.

=== Service summary ===
Preceding station	National Rail	Following station
Rugby towards Crewe	London Northwestern Railway London–Crewe	London Euston Terminus
Wolverton towards Birmingham New Street	London Northwestern Railway London–Birmingham	Bletchley towards London Euston
Terminus	London Northwestern Railway London–Milton Keynes	Bletchley towards London Euston
Crewe	Avanti West Coast Liverpool–London	London Euston
Rugby	Avanti West Coast Manchester–London	London Euston
Rugby	Avanti West Coast Glasgow/Edinburgh/Blackpool–Birmingham–London	Watford Junction
Nuneaton	Lumo; Stirling–London	London Euston
	Future services	
Terminus	Chiltern Railways; Milton Keynes Central–Oxford	Bletchley
	Previous services	
Terminus	Southern; Milton Keynes Central–South Croydon	Bletchley

== Location ==
The station is at the western end of Central Milton Keynes, near the junction of the A5 with the A509. In the chainage notation, traditionally used on the railway, its location on the line is 49 miles 65 chains (49.81 mi; 80.17 km) from Euston.

== In film ==
The station and its plaza were used in the 1987 movie Superman IV: The Quest for Peace as a substitute for the United Nations building. Other scenes were shot in the Central Milton Keynes area.
