= Concrete Cows =

Sculptures by Liz Leyh in Milton Keynes, England

Coordinates: 52°03′04″N 0°47′43″W

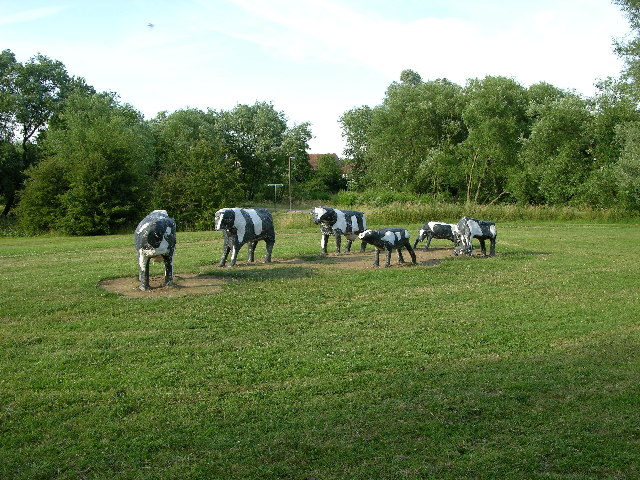
Replica Concrete Cows at Bancroft

The Concrete Cows in Milton Keynes, England are an iconic work of sculpture, created in 1978 by the American artist Liz Leyh. There are three cows and three calves, approximately half life size.

The Cows are constructed from scrap, skinned with fibreglass-reinforced concrete donated by a local builder.

== Context ==
Liz Leyh was an "artist-in-residence" in the early days of Milton Keynes and part of her role was to lead community participation in art. The Cows was one of a number of pieces created during her stay. Other examples of her work here include The Owl and The Pussy Cat at Netherfield and a concrete mural near the leisure centre at Stantonbury. They were originally constructed at Stacey Hill Farm near Wolverton, where she had set up her studio. The base armatures were metal, with chicken wire used to create the general shape, then stuffed with newspaper. The original colouring of the cows was achieved using dyes. Some cows were brown. It is only through the council painting the cows that the uniform black and white has appeared. The artist also ensured that each cow had a heart shape used as part of the pattern on the cow skin.

Later commentators have interpreted it as an example of conceptual art: the artist poking fun at the preconceived notion of the new city, held by commentators who had never seen the place, that it would consist entirely of concrete pavements where once there were fields, and where its deprived children would need models to know how real cows once looked. The reality of course was different: Milton Keynes Development Corporation was building "a city in the forest", with substantially more open green space than found in traditional cities. Furthermore, there are real farms with real cows within 2 miles (3 km) of the site, and the cows are currently located in a real field.

== Response ==
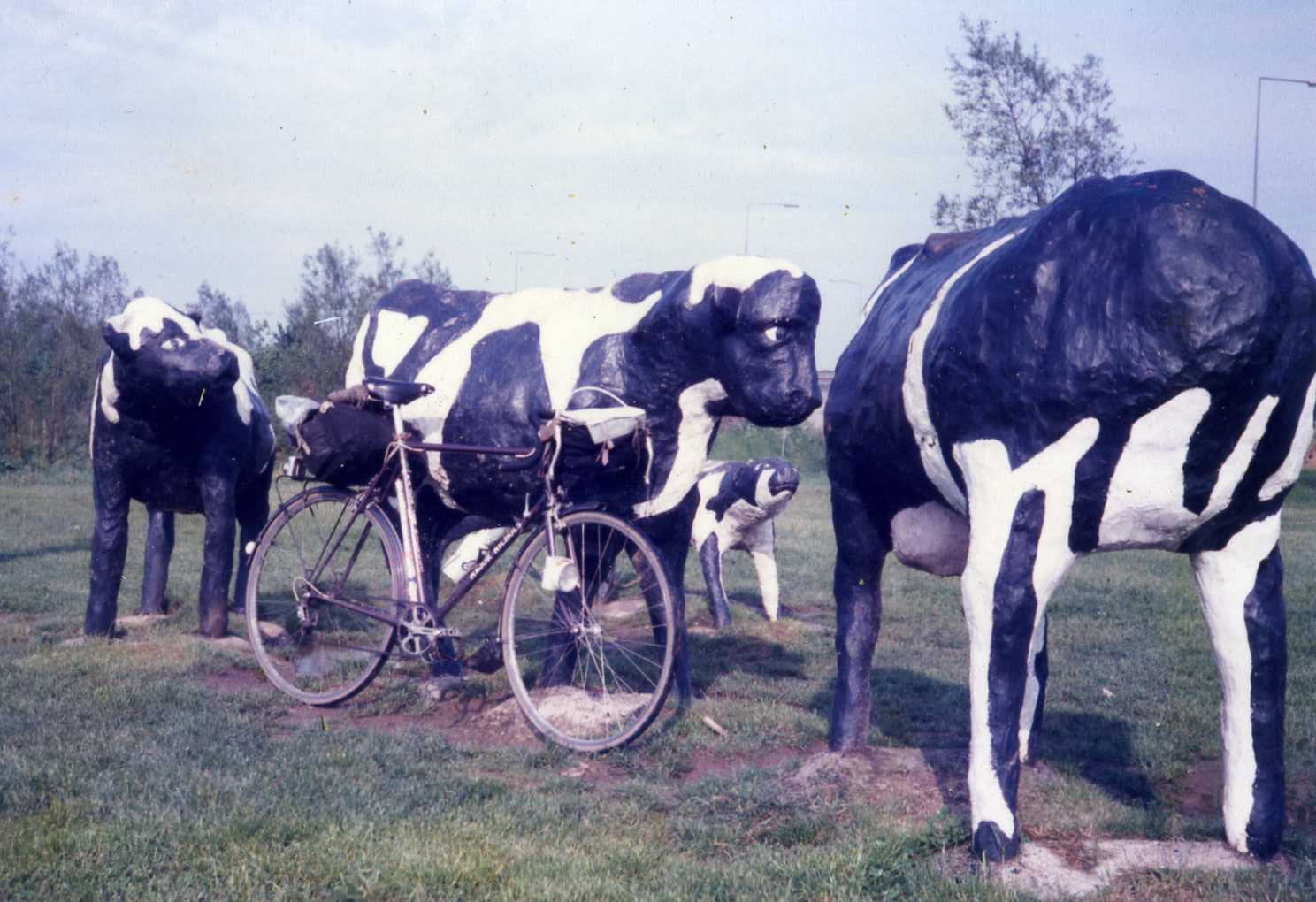
The cows in 1985

On their original site in a public park, the Cows have been vandalised and modified. Sometimes they have simply been damaged, while at other times they have been painted pink, become zebras, become skeletal, had pyjama bottoms added, have been beheaded, have acquired BSE (mad cow disease) graffiti, had one of the calves kidnapped (with ransom notes to the local papers). One of the Cows briefly enjoyed the services of a papier-mâché bull. When UK Culture Minister Kim Howells referred to modern art trends as "conceptual bullshit", the Cows acquired concrete cow-pats.

== Significance ==
In a programme, The Sculpture 100, made for Sky Television in December 2005, the Concrete Cows were included in a list of the 100 most influential works of twentieth-century open-air sculpture in England. The list also includes another piece in Milton Keynes: Triple Starhead by Paul Neagu (in Furzton).

Two of the Cows featured at the British pavilion at the Venice Biennale of Architecture (2014).

== In popular culture ==
The home supporters stand at Milton Keynes Dons F.C. is known as "The Cowshed", while its home stadium was briefly nicknamed 'The Moo Camp' (after FC Barcelona's Nou Camp). The team mascots are two pantomime-style cows named "Donny" and "Mooie".

Actor Russell Crowe joked about the cows in 2007 while promoting the movie 3:10 to Yuma. The cows appear in Charles Stross' story The Concrete Jungle, and in Mark Wallington's Destination Lapland, where he marked seeing them as a highlight of his passing visit.

== Location ==
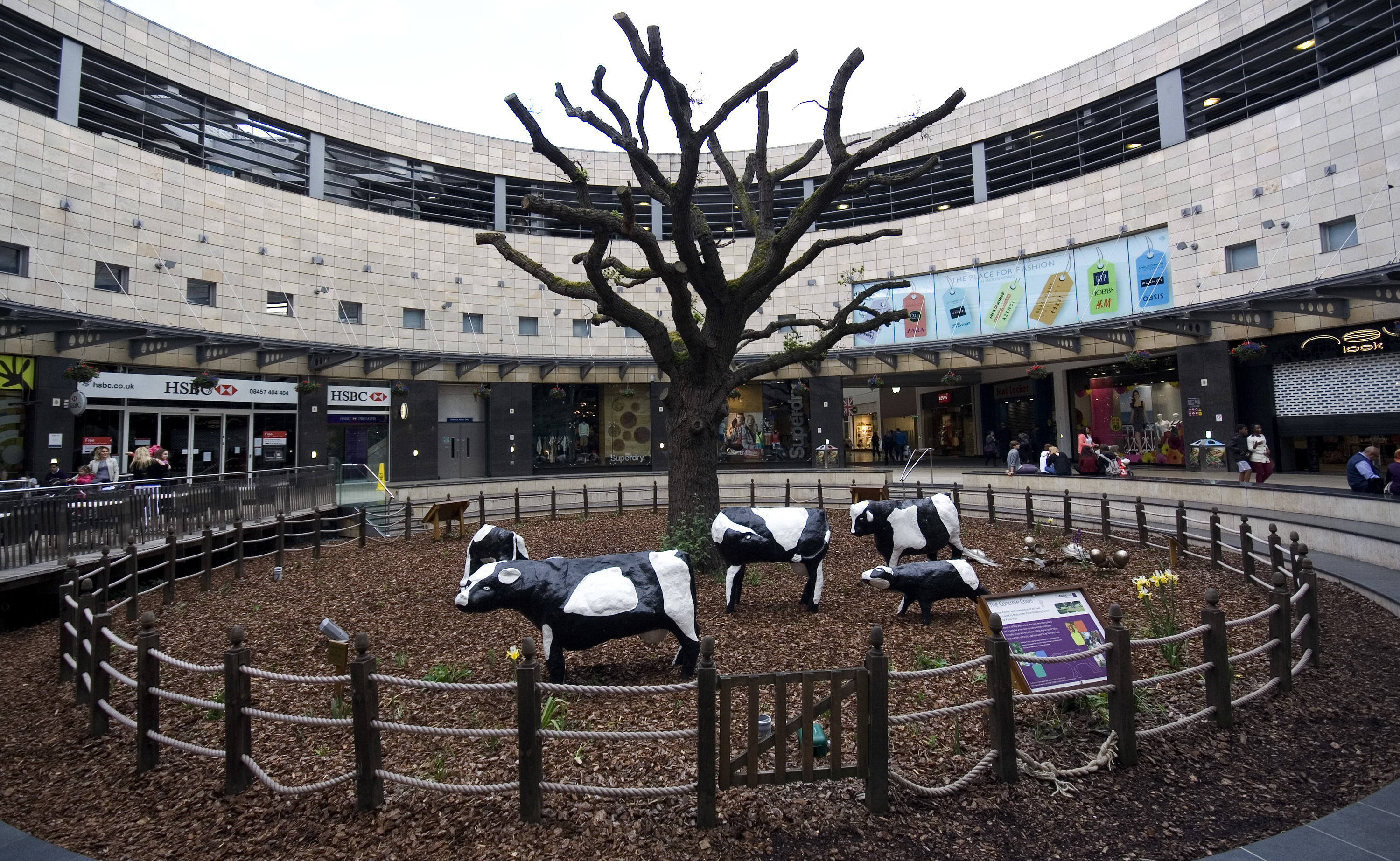
The original Concrete Cows at Midsummer Place

The Cows were made at Stacey Hill Farm, now the site of the Milton Keynes Museum. and originally located at a parkland site in Bancroft. They have subsequently resided at the National Hockey Stadium and Midsummer Place, beside the Central Milton Keynes Shopping Centre. In spring 2016 they were moved to MK Museum – which is where they originally started out as a temporary exhibit.

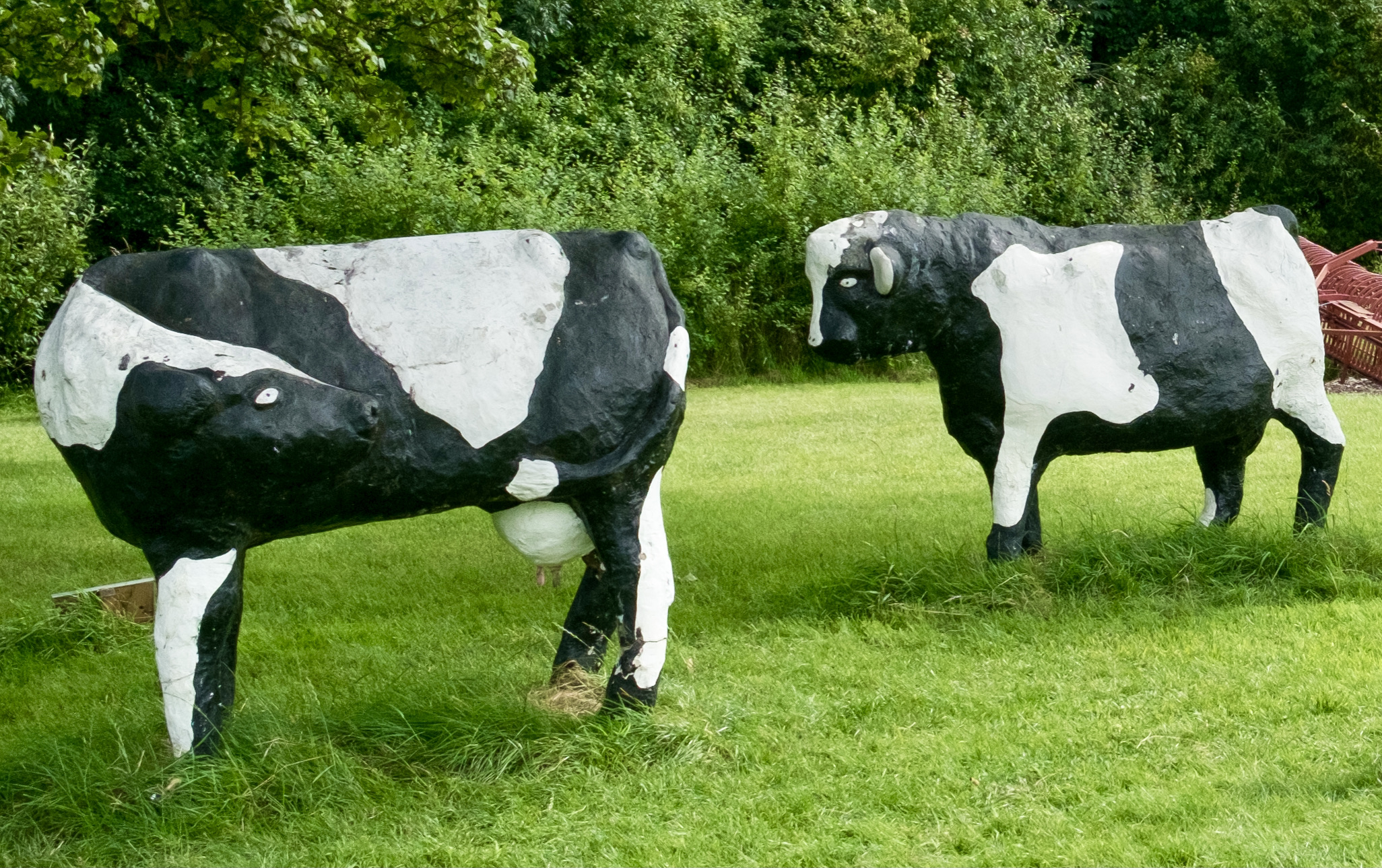
The restored original cows, now back home at MK Museum, June 2017

However the replicas (made by Bill Billings) in Bancroft are perhaps better known and are sited next to the A422 (Monks Way) between V5 Great Monks St. and V6 Grafton St.) where it passes under the West Coast Main Line, near its junction with the A5. Direct access on foot or by bike is possible by redway. The nearest rail stations for Bancroft or the MK Museum are Milton Keynes Central and Wolverton. Buses for Bancroft include Arriva buses 5 and 6 between Bletchley, Central Milton Keynes and Wolverton which call at near-by bus stops on each side of Monks Way near the junction with H3's northern carriageway and Octavian Drive. If approaching on foot or by bike from these stops, a stream separates the cows from the eastern (Octavian Rd) side of H3. There is a bridge over the stream next to the southern carriageway of H3, and an underpass links this bridge to the cows' field.

== See also ==
- Harold F. Clayton – another sculptor of cows
- CowParade – a festival of cow sculpture
- Bancroft Roman Villa, also in Bancroft Park and a short distance from the Cows.
