= History of Milton Keynes =

History of the city in England

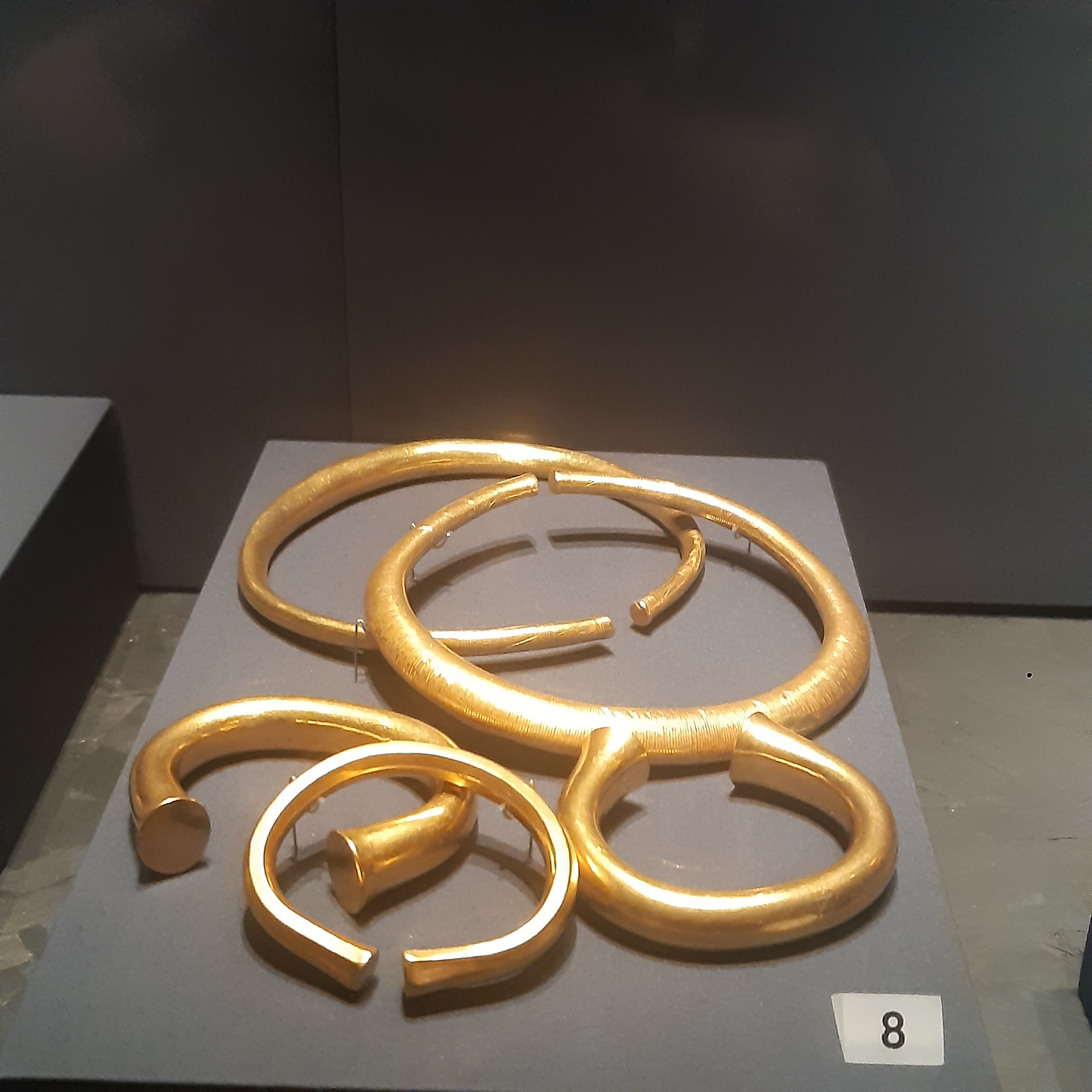
The Milton Keynes Hoard of Bronze Age torcs and bracelets, on display at the British Museum

This history of Milton Keynes details its development from the earliest human settlements, through the plans for a 'new city' for 250,000 people in northern Southeast England, its subsequent urban design and development, to the present day. Milton Keynes, founded in 1967, is the largest settlement and only city in Buckinghamshire. At the 2021 census, the population of its urban area was estimated to have exceeded 256,000.

Before its 1967 designation as the site for a new town, the area to be developed was largely farmland and undeveloped villages. Before construction began, every area was subject to detailed archaeological investigation: doing so has exposed a rich history of human settlement since Neolithic times and has provided a unique insight into the history and archaeology of a large sample of the landscape of north Buckinghamshire.

== Pre-history and early human settlement ==
Long before England existed, this area was at the bottom of a primeval sea. The most notable of the fossils uncovered is that of an ichthyosaur from Caldecotte, now on display in the central library.

Human settlement began in this area around 2000 BCE, mainly in the valleys of the rivers Ouse and Ouzel, and their tributaries (Bradwell Brook, Shenley Brook). Archaeological excavations revealed several burial sites dating from 2000 BCE to 1500 BCE. Evidence for the earliest habitation was found at Blue Bridge – production of flint tools from the Mesolithic. In the same area, an unusually large (18-metre or 59-foot diameter) round house was excavated and dated to the Late Bronze Age/Early Iron Age, about 700 BCE. Other excavations in this Blue Bridge/Bancroft hill-side uncovered a further seven substantial settlement sites, dating from then until 100 BCE.

=== Milton Keynes Hoard ===
The area that was to become Milton Keynes was relatively rich: the Milton Keynes Hoard is one of the largest (by weight, 2.2 kg or 4.9 lb) hoard of Bronze Age jewellery ever found in Britain: the British Museum described it as 'one of the biggest concentrations of Bronze Age gold known from Britain and seems to flaunt wealth'. It was discovered in September 2000 at Monkston (near Milton Keynes village) and consists of two Bronze Age gold torcs and three gold bracelets in a datable clay pot. (Note: now in collection of the British Museum, replicas are on display in the Milton Keynes Museum)

== Roman Britain ==
Before the Roman conquest of Britain of 43 CE, the Catuvellauni (a British Iron Age tribe) controlled this area from their hillfort at Danesborough, (Note: At 52°00′15″N 0°39′36″W (SP920348)) near Woburn Sands. Under Roman occupation, the area thrived. The obvious reason for this is the major Roman road, Iter II (later known as Watling Street), that runs through the area and that gave rise to an associated Roman town at Magiovinium (Fenny Stratford). A 'superb example' of the first type of coin to circulate in Britain was found here, a gold stater from mid-second century BCE.

The foundations of a large Romano-British villa were excavated at Bancroft Park, complete with under-floor heating and mosaic floor. Further excavations revealed that this area, overlooking the fertile valley of the Bradwell Brook, was in continuous occupation for 2,000 years, from the Late Bronze Age to the early Saxon period. Cremation grave goods from the Iron Age found on the site included jewellery and fine pottery. Other Romano-British settlements were found at Stanton Low, Woughton, and Wymbush. Industrial activity of the period included bronze working and pottery making at Caldecotte, pottery also at Wavendon Gate, and many iron-working sites.

== Anglo-Saxon period ==
It seems that most of the Romano-British sites were abandoned by the Romano-British by the fifth century and the arable land reverted to scrub and woodland. Arriving in the sixth century, the Anglo-Saxons began to clear the land again. Bletchley ('Blaeca's clearing') and the Shenleys ('Bright clearing') date from this period. Large settlements have been excavated at Pennyland and near Milton Keynes village. Their cemeteries have been found at Newport Pagnell, Shenley, and Tattenhoe.

Excavations in and around the modern villages have failed to find any evidence of occupation before the 10th or 11th centuries, except in Bradwell where Bradwell Bury is traced to the 9th century. The Domesday Book of 1086 provides the first documentary evidence for many settlements, listing Bertone (Broughton), Calvretone (Calverton), Linforde (Great Linford), Lochintone (Loughton), Neuport (Newport Pagnell), Nevtone (Newton Longville), Senelai (Shenley, Milton Keynes), Siwinestone (Simpson), Ulchetone (Woughton on the Green), Wluerintone (Wolverton) and Wlsiestone (Woolstone).

Administration of the area that was later to become the City of Milton Keynes was in 'Hundreds' – initially (11C) Sigelai (also Secklow or Seckloe) Hundred, Bunstou (or Bunsty) Hundred and Moulsoe Hundred, amalgamated as the 'three hundreds of Newport' in the middle of the 13th Century.

Secklow Mound, the moot mound of Sigelai Hundred, has been found, excavated and reconstructed: it is on the highest land in the central area and is just behind the Central Library in modern Central Milton Keynes. It is a scheduled monument.

Newport Pagnell, established early in the 10th century, was the principal market town for the area.

== Norman conquest and the medieval period ==
Name "Middelton Keynes", from Plea Rolls of the Court of Common Pleas, 1461

After the Norman conquest, the de Cahaignes family (pronounced KAYNZ) held the manor of Middleton from 1166 to the late 13th century as well as others in the country (Ashton Keynes in Wiltshire, Somerford Keynes in Gloucestershire, and Horsted Keynes in West Sussex). (The village became "Middleton de Cahaignes" and mutated over following centuries to become "Milton Keynes" (pronounced KEENZ).) Walter Giffard, Lord of Longueville (and his son, Walter Giffard, 1st Earl of Buckingham) was overlord of most of the land that became the modern city almost 1000 years later. There are Norman motte and bailey castle sites in Old Wolverton and Shenley Church End.

Stony Stratford and Fenny Stratford were founded as market towns on Watling Street in the late 12th or early 13th centuries

By the early 13th century, North Buckinghamshire had several religious houses: Bradwell Abbey (1154) is within modern Milton Keynes and Snelshall Priory (by 13th century) is just outside it. Both were Benedictine priories.

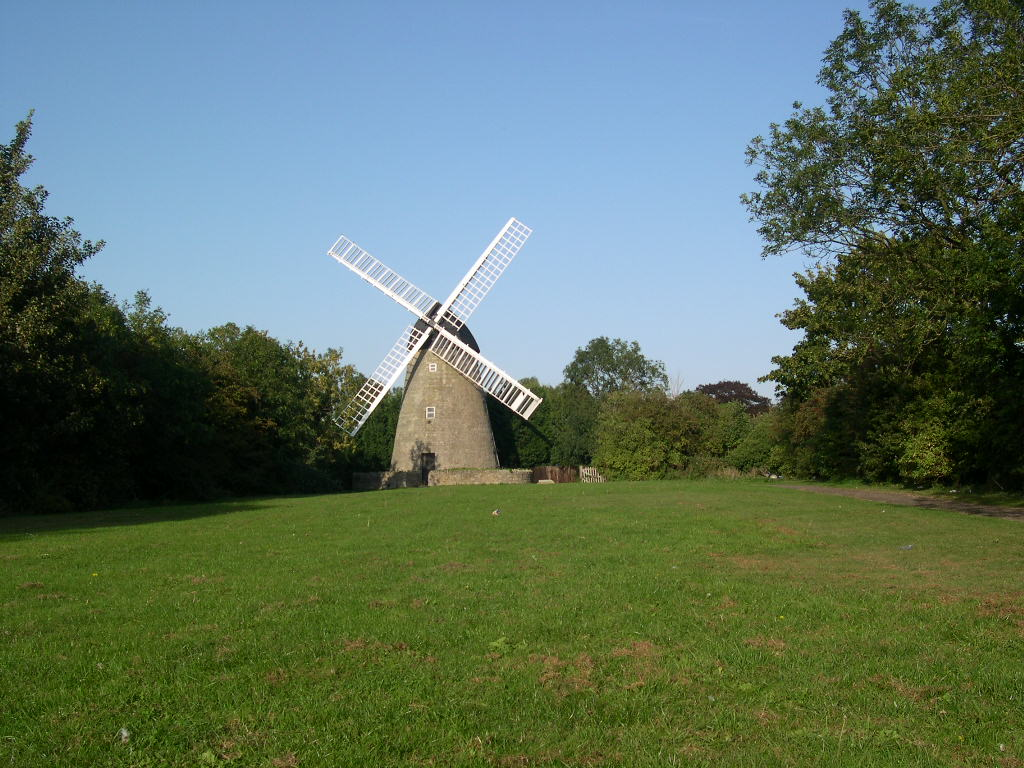
The windmill of 1815 near Bradwell village

Britain's earliest (excavated) windmill is in Great Linford. The large oak beams forming the base supports still survived in the mill mound and were shown by radio carbon dating to originate in the first half of the 13th century. (The present stone tower mill near Bradwell was built in 1815,)

Only one medieval manor house survives: the 15th century Manor Farmhouse in Loughton. There are sites of other manor houses in Little Woolstone, Milton Keynes village, and Woughton on the Green. The oldest surviving domestic building is Number 22, Milton Keynes (village), the house of the bailiff of the manor of Bradwell.

== Early modern Britain ==
=== Enclosures ===
Most of the eighteen medieval villages in Milton Keynes are still extant and are at the heart of their respective districts. But some, such as Old Wolverton, remain only as field patterns marking a deserted village. The desertion of Old Wolverton was due to enclosure of the large strip cultivation fields into small 'closes' by the local landlords, the Longville family, who turned arable land over to pasture. By 1654, the family had completely enclosed the parish. With the end of the feudal system, the peasants had lost their land and tillage/grazing rights and were forced to find other work or starve. Thus Old Wolverton was reduced from about thirty peasant families in the mid 16th century. There are also deserted village sites in Tattenhoe and Westbury (Shenley Wood).

=== Turnpike roads ===
Some important roads cross the site of the new city. Most important of these is Watling Street between London and Chester. The Oxford–Cambridge route came through Stony Stratford, Wolverton and Newport Pagnell. Unfortunately, the heavy clay soils, poor drainage and slow-running streams made these routes frequently impassable in winter. The Hockliffe–Dunchurch stretch of Watling Street became a (paved) Turnpike in 1706. Until about 1830, the London–Northampton road through Simpson "was generally impassible ['throughout a great portion of the winter'] without wading through water three feet deep (0.9m), for a distance of about 200 yards (180m)". In 1870, the new Northampton–London turnpike diverted away at Broughton to take the higher route through Wavendon and Woburn Sands to join Watling Street near Hockliffe. On the east–west route, the Stony Stratford–Newport Pagnell turnpike of 1814 extended the Woodstock–Bicester–Stony Stratford turnpike of 1768.Turnpikes provided a major boost to the economy of Fenny Stratford and particularly Stony Stratford. In the stage coach era, Stony Stratford was a major resting place and exchange point with the east–west route. In the early 19th century, over 30 coaches a day stopped here. In September 1838, the London and Birmingham Railway (now the West Coast Main Line) opened through nearby Wolverton and took over much of this traffic.

=== Grand Junction Canal ===
The Grand Junction Canal came through the area between 1793 and 1800, with canal-side wharfs in Fenny Stratford, Great Linford, Bradwell and Wolverton. The route bypassed Newport Pagnell but, in 1817, an arm was dug to it from Great Linford. Trade along the canal stimulated the local economy. A large brickworks was established near the canal in Great Linford: two bottle kilns and the clay pits can still be seen on the site.

=== London and Birmingham Railway, Wolverton and New Bradwell new towns ===
The London and Birmingham Railway brought even more profound changes to the area. Wolverton was the halfway point on the rail route, where engines were changed and passengers alighted for refreshments. Wolverton railway works was established here, creating work for thousands of people in the surrounding area. In the period 1840 to 1880, new towns were built in New Bradwell and Wolverton (about 2 km or 1.2 mi east of the original deserted village) to house them. A narrow gauge railway, the Wolverton to Newport Pagnell Line, was built to Newport Pagnell in 1866, much of it by closing and reusing the Newport Arm of the canal. The Wolverton and Stony Stratford Tramway ran to Stony Stratford from 1888 (to 1926) and, in 1889, was extended to Deanshanger in Northamptonshire.

Bletchley, on the 1846 junction of the London and Birmingham railway with the Bedford branch, was to become an important railway town too. In 1850, another branch from Bletchley to Oxford was built, later to become the (Cambridge/Oxford) Varsity Line. Bletchley, originally a small village in the parish of Fenny Stratford, grew to reach and absorb its parent. In Stony Stratford, expertise learned in the works was applied to the construction of traction engines for agricultural use and the site of the present Cofferidge Close was engaged in their manufacture.

== Bletchley Park ==
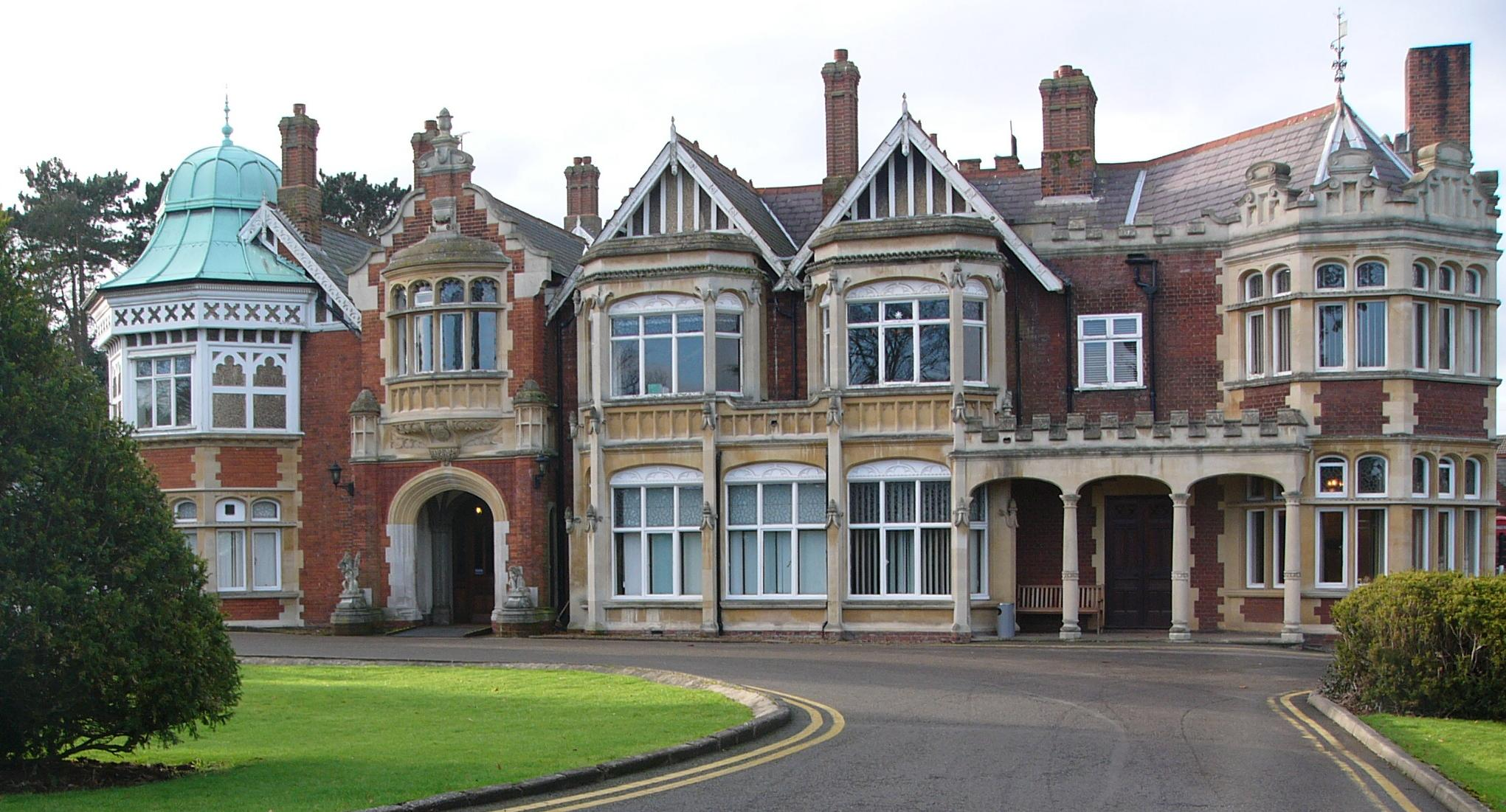
Bletchley Park – "Station X".

Bletchley Park is a former private estate located in Old Bletchley, an important military intelligence site during World War II and today home to the modern Museums of Cryptography and of Computing. Conveniently located at the junction of the Varsity Line with the West Coast Main Line, Bletchley Park (code-named Station X) was the location of the Allied main code-breaking establishment during World War II. Codes and ciphers of several Axis powers were deciphered there, most famously the German Enigma. Colossus, the world's first programmable electronic digital computer was put to work here as part of the codebreaking effort. The high-level intelligence produced by Bletchley Park, codenamed Ultra, is frequently credited with aiding the Allied war effort and shortening the war.

== "Bigger, Better, Brighter" – Bletchley in the 20th century ==
Almost forty years after the construction of Bletchley railway station, the 1884/5 Ordnance Survey shows Bletchley as still just a small village around the (C of E) parish church at Bletchley Park, and a hamlet near the Methodist chapel and Shoulder of Mutton public house at the junction of Shenley Road/Newton Road with Buckingham Road. (These districts are known today as Old Bletchley and Far Bletchley). The major settlement of the time is Fenny Stratford.

By 1911, the population of the combined parishes was 5,166 but the balance between them had changed: in that year, the name of the local council (Urban District) changed from Fenny Stratford UD to Bletchley UD. The 1926 Ordnance Survey shows the settlements beginning to merge, with large private houses along the Bletchley Road between them. In 1933, the newly founded Bletchley Gazette began a campaign for a "Bigger, Better, Brighter, Bletchley". As the nation emerged from World War II, Bletchley Council renewed its desire to expand from its 1951 population of 10,919. By mid-1952, the council was able to agree terms with five London Boroughs to accept people and businesses from bombed-out sites in London. This trend continued through the 1950s and 1960s, culminating (Note: meaning both "the last" and "the best". The Greater London Council (GLC) was very proud of the Lakes Estate, declaring it to be the finest in modern architecture for a working class estate, based on the design concept pioneered in Radburn, New Jersey) in the GLC-funded Lakes Estate in Water Eaton parish, even as Milton Keynes was being founded. Industrial development kept pace, with former London businesses relocating to new industrial estates in Mount Farm and Denbigh – Marshall Amplification being the most notable. With compulsory purchase, Bletchley Road (now renamed Queensway after a royal visit in 1966) became the new high street with wide pavements where front gardens once lay. Houses near the railway end were replaced by shops but those nearer Fenny Stratford became banks and professional premises. At the 1971 Census, the population of the Bletchley Urban District was 30,642.

Bletchley had fought to be the centre of the proposed new city, but it was not to be. The 1970 Plan for Milton Keynes placed Central Milton Keynes on a completely new hill-top site four miles further north, halfway to Wolverton. Bletchley became one of the towns and villages incorporated into the new city.

== 1960s plans for a new city in North Buckinghamshire, 1967 designation of Milton Keynes ==
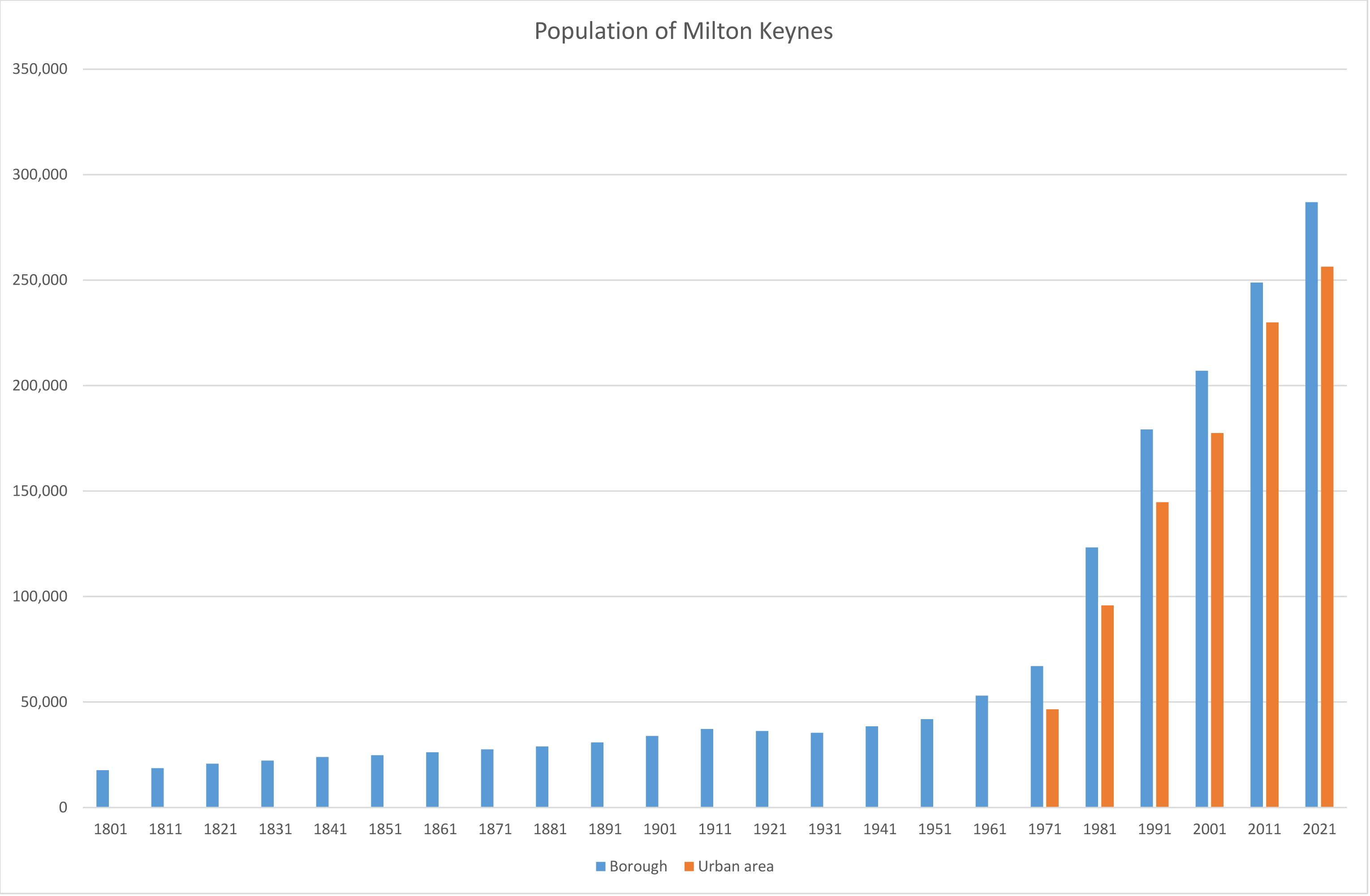
Population trend of Borough and Urban Area 1801–2021

In the 1960s, the UK Government decided that a further generation of new towns in the South East of England was needed to relieve housing congestion in London. Ten years earlier, the London County Council had constructed overspill housing in Bletchley for several London boroughs there. Further studies in the 1960s identified north Buckinghamshire as a possible site for a large new town, a new city. (Note: The Plan for Milton Keynes begins (in the Foreword by Lord ("Jock") Campbell of Eskan): "This plan for building the new city of Milton Keynes ... ")

Buckinghamshire County Council's architect, Fred Pooley, had spent considerable time in the early sixties developing ideas for a new town in the Bletchley and Wolverton area. He developed a futuristic proposal based on a monorail linking a series of individual high-rise townships to a major town centre. The county council published the proposals in 1966, but new thinking at the Ministry of the Environment rejected its ideas. (Note: Nevertheless, the London media continued to describe Milton Keynes as though the Pooley concepts had prevailed.)

In 1964, a Ministry of Housing and Local Government study had recommended "a new city" near Bletchley. A further MoH&LG study in 1965 proposed that the proposed new city would encompass the existing towns of Bletchley, Stony Stratford and Wolverton. It was to be the biggest new town yet, with a target population of 250,000. A Draft Order was made in April 1966. The Housing Minister, Anthony Greenwood, made his formal announcement on 23 January 1967. The designated area was 21,870 acres (8,850 ha), somewhat smaller than the 27,000 acres (11,000 ha) in the Draft Order (due to the exclusion of the Calverton Wealds). The name "Milton Keynes" was also unveiled at this time, taken from the existing village of Milton Keynes on the site. The site was deliberately located (roughly) equidistant from London, Birmingham, Leicester, Oxford and Cambridge. With its large target population, Milton Keynes was eventually intended to become a city. All subsequent planning documents and popular local usage made use of the term "city" or "new city", even though formal city status had not been awarded until August 2022. (Note: In law, it is the Borough rather than its eponymous settlement that has city status; nevertheless it is the latter that is more commonly known as the city.)

When the boundary of Milton Keynes was defined, some 40,000 people lived in the 'designated area' of almost 9,000 hectares (22,000 acres). The area was split between five existing local authorities: Bletchley, Newport Pagnell and Wolverton Urban Districts together with the Newport Pagnell Rural District and the Winslow Rural District.

The name 'Milton Keynes' was taken from that of an existing village on the site. The area to be developed was largely farmland and undeveloped villages. Before construction began, every area was subject to detailed archaeological investigation: doing so has exposed a rich history of human settlement since Neolithic times and has provided a unique insight into the history and archaeology of a large sample of the landscape of north Buckinghamshire.

=== Existing settlements and oral history ===
In 1967, the designated area outside the four main towns (Bletchley, Newport Pagnell, Stony Stratford, Wolverton) was largely rural farmland but included many picturesque North Buckinghamshire villages and hamlets: Bradwell village and Abbey, Broughton, Caldecotte, Fenny Stratford, Great Linford, Loughton, Milton Keynes Village, New Bradwell, Shenley Brook End, Shenley Church End, Simpson, Stantonbury, Tattenhoe, Tongwell, Walton, Water Eaton, Wavendon, Willen, Great and Little Woolstone, Woughton on the Green. All of these had a rich oral history, which has been recorded.

== Milton Keynes Development Corporation: designing a city for 250,000 people ==
Following publication of the Draft Master Plan for Milton Keynes, the government took planning control from elected local authorities and established the Milton Keynes Development Corporation (MKDC) to deliver its vision. The Minister for Housing and Local Government (Richard Crossman) appointed Lord Campbell ("Jock" Campbell) to lead the new Development Corporation. He and his chief executive, Walter Ismay, appointed Llewellyn Davies as principal planning consultants – the team included Richard Llewellyn-Davies, Walter Bor and John de Monchaux. Execution of the plan was led by General Manager of the corporation, Fred Lloyd Roche. The goals declared in the master plan were these:

- opportunity and freedom of choice
- easy movement and access
- good communications
- balance and variety
- an attractive city
- public awareness and participation
- efficient and imaginative use of resources

The designers were determined to learn from the mistakes made in the earlier new towns and revisit the Garden City ideals. They set in place the characteristic grid roads that run between (rather than through) neighbourhoods and thus the neighbourhoods delineated by them, the Redway system of independent cycle/pedestrian paths, and the intensive planting, lakes and parkland that are so appreciated today. Central Milton Keynes was not intended to be a traditional town centre but a business and shopping district that supplemented the local centres (some new, some original village and town centres) in most of the Grid Squares. This non-hierarchical devolved city plan was a departure from the English New Towns tradition and envisaged a wide range of industry and diversity of housing styles and tenures across the city. The radical grid plan was inspired by the work of Californian urban theorist Melvin M Webber (1921–2006), described by the founding architect of Milton Keynes, Derek Walker, as the city's "father". Webber thought that telecommunications meant that the old idea of a city as a concentric cluster was out of date and that cities that enabled people to travel around them readily would be the thing of the future, achieving "community without propinquity" for residents.

From its establishment in 1967 to its abolition in 1992, the Milton Keynes Development Corporation created by far the largest and thus most ambitious of the British new towns. Many of Britain's most acclaimed building and landscape architects contributed to what was to be a showpiece of British design. Unlike previous new towns, Milton Keynes has a majority of privately funded development but, during the MKDC years, these developments were subject to an exacting design brief in line with the design principles laid out in The Plan for Milton Keynes.

=== Urban design ===
Since the radical plan form and large scale of the New City attracted international attention, early phases of the city include work by celebrated architects, Sir Richard MacCormac, Lord Norman Foster, Henning Larsen, Ralph Erskine, John Winter, and Martin Richardson. The Corporation itself attracted talented young architects led by the respected designer, Derek Walker. Its strongly modernist designs featured regularly in the magazines Architectural Design and the Architects' Journal. Though strongly committed to sleek 'Miesian minimalism' inspired by the German/ American architect Ludwig Mies van der Rohe, they also developed a strand of contextualism in advance of the wider adoption of commercial Post-Modernism as an architectural style in the 1980s. In the Miesian tradition is the Grade II listed CMK Shopping Building designed by Stuart Mosscrop and Christopher Woodward.

=== "City in the forest" ===
The original Development Corporation design concept aimed for a 'forest city' and its foresters planted millions of trees from its own nursery in Newlands in the following years. As of 2006, the urban area had 20 million trees. Following the winding up of the Development Corporation, the lavish landscapes of the Grid Roads and of the major parks were transferred to the Milton Keynes Parks Trust, an independent non-for-profit charity which is separate from the municipal authority and which was thus intended to resist pressures to build on the parks over time. The Parks Trust is endowed with a portfolio of commercial properties, the income from which pays for the upkeep of the green spaces, a citywide maintenance model which has attracted international attention.

=== Public art ===
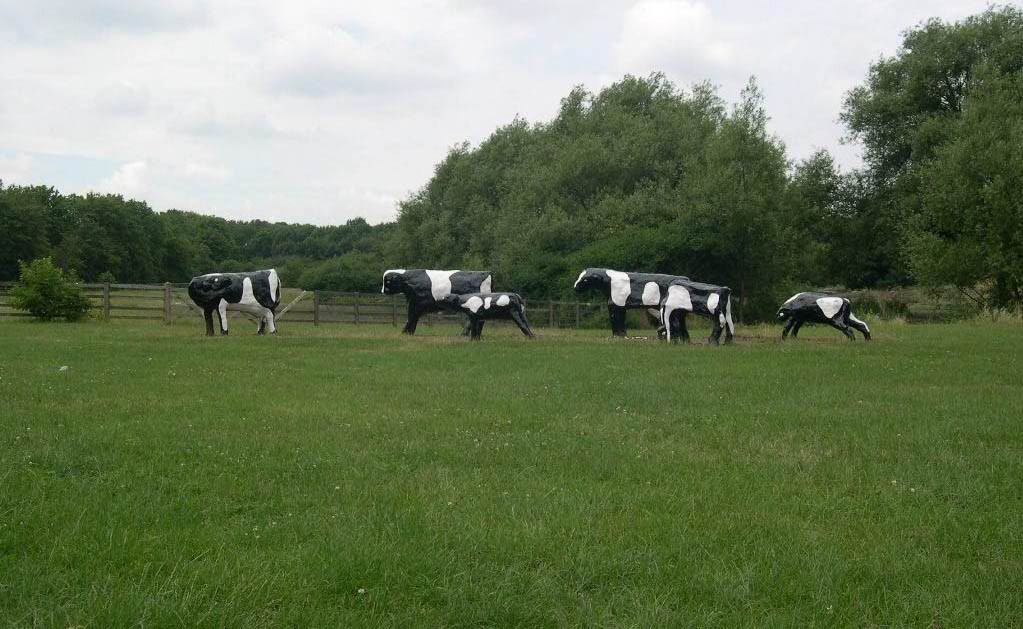
Liz Leyh's Concrete Cows

The Development Corporation had an ambitious public art programme that has been continued by the City Council with more than 220 works on show. The most well known of these include Liz Leyh's Concrete Cows, the Black Horse by Elisabeth Frink and many more.

=== Demographics ===
Unusually for a 1960s-conceived new town, Milton Keynes has arrived at a bias in favour of private sector investment, with about 80% of owner-occupied homes. The political climate determined this: previous new towns were mainly specified by Labour Governments to be primarily for social rent. Milton Keynes began the same way but was mainly built under Conservative governments who insisted on substantial private participation.

== See also ==
- Grade I listed buildings in the City of Milton Keynes
- Grade II* listed buildings in the City of Milton Keynes
- Scheduled monuments in the City of Milton Keynes
