= Milton Keynes Stadium =

Milton Keynes Stadium may mean:

- Stadium MK, the home stadium of Milton Keynes Dons F.C.
- National Hockey Stadium (Milton Keynes), the former home of England Hockey and of Milton Keynes Dons
- The track and field stadium is in Stantonbury, Milton Keynes
- Milton Keynes Greyhound Stadium, a greyhound racing track in the Ashland district, defunct since 2006
