= Stantonbury =

Civil parish in Milton Keynes, England

Coordinates: 52°03′54″N 0°46′12″W

- District and civil parish
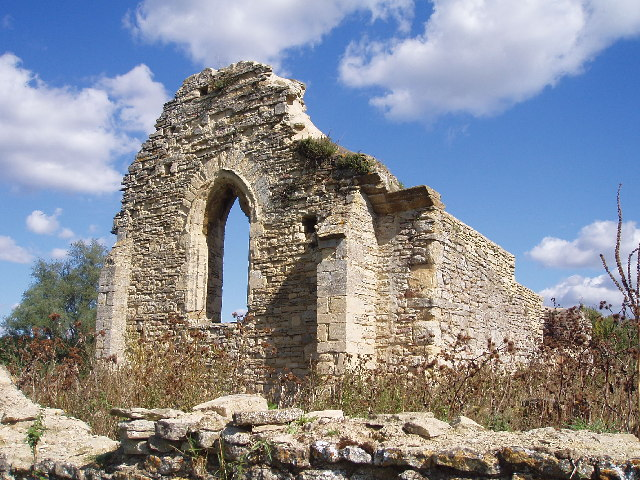
- St Peter's Church, Stanton Low

- Location within Buckinghamshire
- Interactive map of Stantonbury
- Population: 11,354 (2021 census)
- OS grid reference: SP847414
- Civil parish: Stantonbury
- District: City of Milton Keynes
- Unitary authority: Milton Keynes City Council
- Ceremonial county: Buckinghamshire
- Region: South East
- Country: England
- Sovereign state: United Kingdom
- Post town: MILTON KEYNES
- Postcode district: MK14
- Dialling code: 01908
- Police: Thames Valley
- Fire: Buckinghamshire
- Ambulance: South Central
- UK Parliament: Milton Keynes North

Stantonbury is a district and civil parish of Milton Keynes, Buckinghamshire, England, situated roughly 2 miles (3 km) north of the city centre. The toponym Stanton is derived from an Old English term for "stone-built farmstead" and the bury element from the French family Barri who held it in 1235. The original Stantonbury is a deserted medieval village now known as Stanton Low; the Stantonbury name has been reused for the modern district at the heart of the civil parish.

== Civil parish ==
As well as Stantonbury itself, the civil parish of Stantonbury includes the districts of Bancroft and Bancroft Park, Blue Bridge, Bradville and Linford Wood. The population of the parish of Stantonbury grew from 19 at the 1971 census to 3,938 according to the 1981 census. By the time of the 2001 census its population had reached 9,010. At the 2011 census, it had 10,084 people.

=== Bancroft ===
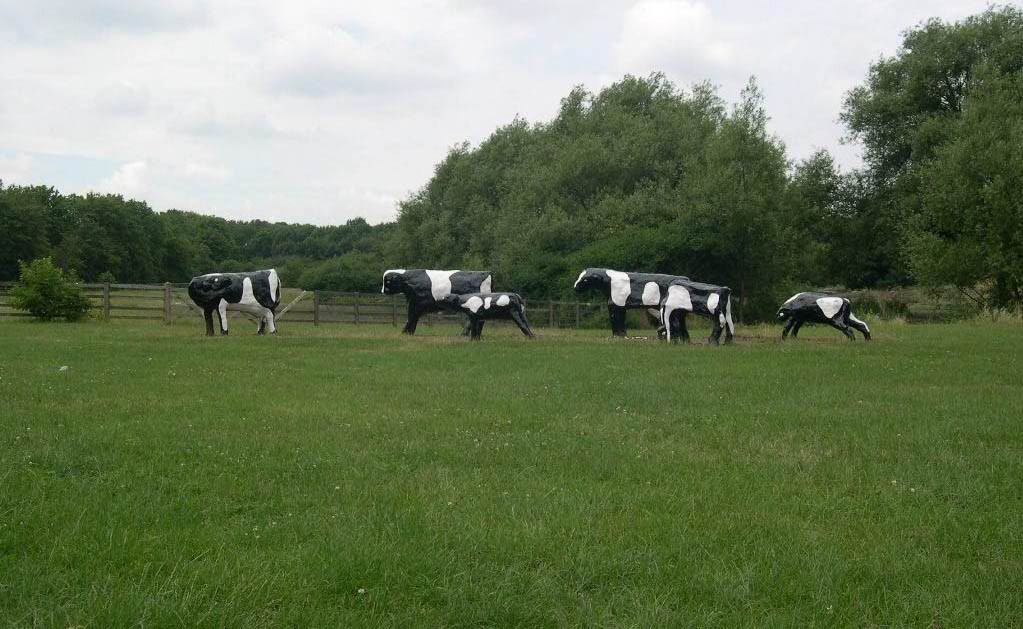
Liz Leyh's Concrete Cows (copy) in Bancroft

The residential Bancroft district is divided by Shenley Brook into Bancroft Park to the west and Bancroft to the east. The brook valley here is part of the flood control system and is a linear park when the brook is not in flood. There is a permanent wetland with associated plants and wildlife.

The foundations of a Romano-British farm known as Bancroft Roman Villa are in what is now the North Loughton Park, overlooking the Shenley Brook. Rescue excavations in 1957 identified a group of perhaps four buildings, traces of a hypocaust and sherds of Iron Age pottery. A section of mosaic flooring recovered from the site is in the "guest services lounge" of Central Milton Keynes shopping centre.

A copy of the famous Concrete Cows sculpture is at the southern end of the park (the original is in the Milton Keynes Museum). The Cows were originally sited here.

Bancroft is a haven for birds and one of the best places to see a common kingfisher. This is because of the wide variety of habitats the Parks Trust has created, from old grassland managed as wildflower meadows, through patches of thorn scrub to extensive marsh. cowslips and salad burnet flower in the spring, followed in summer to the customary flowers of traditional hay meadow: lady's bedstraw and birdsfoot trefoil.

Bancroft pétanque Piste, which is near the Roman villa site, is provided by the Parks Trust free of charge. Also known as boules, pétanque is a traditional game played with steel balls on any sandy or gravelly surface across a large part of Europe.

The West Coast Main Line forms the parish boundary, with Stacey Bushes (in Wolverton and Greenleys parish) on the other side of the tracks. Monks Way (A422) divides the parish from the neighbouring Bradwell.

=== Blue Bridge ===
This small district is mainly residential, near the West Coast Main Line and the Grand Union Canal (which separates it from Stonebridge, the rest of the grid square). It is also home to its own residential club, which it shares with Bancroft Park. The original Blue Bridge (1835), now closed to all traffic, is one of the oldest bridges over the West Coast Main Line and is a Grade II listed structure. It was built to provide access across the new railway cutting from Stacey Hill Farm (now the Milton Keynes Museum) to its lands to the east, which subsequently became the Blue Bridge neighbourhood.

=== Bradville ===
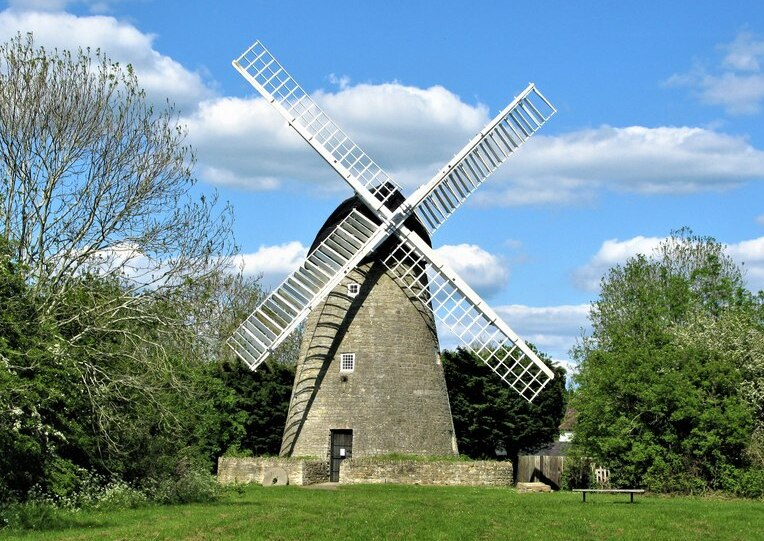
Bradwell Windmill in Bradville (at SP8310841126)

This district, between Bradwell, New Bradwell and Stantonbury itself is mainly residential. The windmill is a Grade II listed building.

=== Linford Wood ===
As well as the ancient woodland that gives it its name, this district is mainly for high-tech industry. It is best known in Milton Keynes as the site of the telecommunications tower, for which it was chosen for its high elevation. It was originally part of the Linford demesne.

=== Oakridge Park ===
This small district of private housing development, part of the northern expansion of Milton Keynes outside its 1967 designated boundary, dates from about 2010. There is a small local centre with an Asda supermarket, a pharmacy and other small shops.

=== Stantonbury ===
This district lies north of Central Milton Keynes, between Great Linford and Wolverton, and south of Oakridge Park. It is largely residential, but the greater proportion of the area is taken up by two secondary schools (Stantonbury School and the Webber Independent School), a Theatre, leisure centre with a 25m swimming pool and an all-weather, competition standard, athletics track.

Modern Stantonbury lies on land historically known as "Stanton High" (as opposed to "Stanton Low").

=== Stanton Low ===
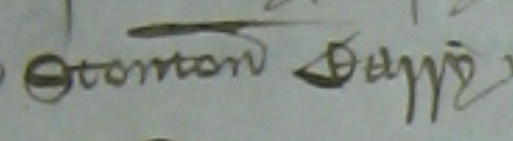
A clip from a Plea Roll of the Court of Common Pleas (1424) that reads "Stonton Barry", the ancient name of Stantonbury

Stanton Low lies near the River Great Ouse and is the deserted village of historic Stantonbury, one of the rural Buckinghamshire villages that were included in the area designated in 1967 to become Milton Keynes. Today this is an uninhabited agricultural area near the river. Little if anything remains of the deserted village other than the ruins of the parish church of St Peter. In the late 1950s the ruins of a Roman villa were discovered here, but were completely destroyed by gravel extraction.

== Church of St Peter ==
The former Church of England parish church of Saint Peter in Stanton Low (map) is Norman, with a mid-12th century nave and even earlier chancel. There was a squint in the south wall of the chancel, but this was later blocked. St. Peter's was extensively rebuilt in the 13th century; the Decorated Gothic east window and piscina were added in the 14th century. By the latter part of the 17th century Stantonbury was almost deserted but the church was still in use; between 1668 and 1674 the Puritan poet and hymnwriter John Mason was its parish priest. In 1736 only four houses remained in the village, but St Peter's was still in use in 1927 and John Piper painted a watercolour of it in about 1940. By 1955 the church had been disused for a number of years; the following year the roof collapsed. and was not repaired. By 1973 St. Peter's was a ruin, and the east window and ornamented Norman chancel arch had been removed (in 1963, to the Church of St James in New Bradwell.) The building is a Grade II listed building.

Because the civil parish boundary runs along the canal, St Peter's is actually in Haversham-cum-Little Linford civil parish.

== Sources ==
- Mynard, Dennis C. (1971). "Rescue excavations at the deserted medieval village of Stantonbury, Bucks" (PDF). Records of Buckinghamshire. 19. Bucks Archaeological Society: 17–41.
- Page, William H., ed. (1927). "Parishes : Stantonbury". A History of the County of Buckingham. Victoria History of the Counties of England. Vol. 4. London: Constable & Co. Ltd. pp. 462–466.
- Pevsner, Nikolaus (1973) [1960]. Buckinghamshire. The Buildings of England. Harmondsworth: Penguin Books. p. 241. ISBN 0-14-071019-1.
