= Derek Walker (architect) =

British architect

- Born: 15 June 1929; Blackburn, Lancashire
- Died: 11 May 2015 (aged 85)
- Education: Leeds Art School
- Occupation: Architect
- Known for: Milton Keynes Chief Architect
- Notable work: Royal Armouries Museum, Leeds
- Spouses: Jill Messenger; Second wife (name unknown); Eve Happold (2003-15)
- Children: Matthew Walker, Alex Walker

Derek John Walker (15 June 1929 – 11 May 2015) was a British architect primarily associated with urban planning and leisure facilities architecture, through his firm Derek Walker Associates.

== Career ==
After completing his national service, Walker went on to study architecture at Leeds Art School; whilst there he met his first wife Jill Messenger. He then studied planning at the University of Pennsylvania before returning to the UK in 1960 to set up an architectural practice in Leeds.

From 1970 to 1976 Walker was Chief Architect and planner of the new town Milton Keynes. He recruited a team and over seven years produced a landscaping strategy for the 'new city', eleven village plans, the structure for the programme for producing 3000 houses per year with supporting community, leisure, retail and sporting and cultural facilities.

Amongst his many buildings, possibly the most celebrated was the Central Milton Keynes Shopping Centre. At the time of its opening in 1979 it was a unique concept for 1,000,000 sq ft (93,000 m^{2}) of retail space with a plan generated around covered landscaped streets. The team for this complex included Stuart Mosscrop, Christopher Woodward and Syd Green. In July 2010, the building was recognised with a Grade II listing, to applause from the 20th Century Society and other conservationists.

In 1980 Walker was involved with Norman Foster and Frank Newby in a controversial scheme to expand the Whitney Museum in New York City using air rights purchased from nearby properties to build a mixed-use skyscraper which would include a new wing for the museum. When a furore developed, the museum denied it had solicited the team.

He ran the architecture course at the Royal College of Art between 1984 and 1990.

Walker was the architect for the Royal Armouries Museum in Leeds, a £42.5million project which opened to the public in 1996.

=== Academic Posts ===
- Professor of Architecture and Design, Royal College of Art, London
- Visiting professor, University of California, Los Angeles
- University of Southern California
- University of Pennsylvania

== Personal life ==
Walker was born on 15 June 1929 in Blackburn, Lancashire, however he and his family moved to Leeds in West Yorkshire when he was very young.

He was first married to the artist Jill Messenger; they had two sons. He was married secondly and his third wife was Eve Happold.

Walker was a lifelong sports fanatic with a passion for cricket, and was a supporter of Leeds United FC.

== Notable projects ==
=== Derek Walker Associates ===
- Housing Association, Newton Garth, Leeds 1968/69
- Royal Armouries Museum, Leeds 1996
- Extensive renovations of the Happy Valley Racecourse in Hong Kong
- The Whitney Museum extension in New York, with Sir Norman Foster
- Kowloon Park Hong Kong including Olympic Pools, Sports hall, Piazza, Sculpture walk and Chinese garden
- New Equine Training Facility for Royal Hong Kong Jockey Club at Shatin
- Master Plan for New City of Jubail in Saudi Arabia
- The Lijnbaan covered Shopping Precinct, City of Rotterdam
- Central Business District for New City of Jubail, Saudi Arabia – Masterplan
- The Wonderworld Themepark and Related Industries proposal for a 1,000-acre (4.0 km^{2}) site Corby
- Clarence Dock – Masterplan mixed-use development, Leeds
- Telluride Year Round Resort Masterplan Colorado USA
- Commodores Point mixed use Development and Marina, Jacksonville, Florida – Masterplan
- Museum of British History – a proposal for the St Bartholomew's Hospital site London
- Ushiku – Masterplan for a city of 100,000 people Ushiku, Japan
- "Xanadu" – an unrealised 2,000,000 sq ft (190,000 m^{2}) mixed use Leisure Development Rotherham Lancashire
- National Museum of the United States Army Washington DC – Concept and Detailed Design
- "Golden Eye for Blackpool" – a proposed Second Gateway Covered Leisure Facility and Mixed Use Development

=== Milton Keynes Development Corporation ===
- Central Milton Keynes Shopping Centre, Milton Keynes
- The City Park and Sculpture Park for Central Milton Keynes

== Publications ==
- The Great Engineers: The Art of British Engineers 1837–1987. ISBN 0-85670-917-4.
- Happold: The Confidence to Build. ISBN 0-419-24060-8.
- Animated Architecture.
- Derek Walker Associates "'The View from Great Linford' Monograph" ISBN 978-1-85490-282-5
- 'Los Angeles Profile Architectural Design Magazine with USC 1982"
- Structural Engineering Design in Practice. With Roger Westbrook.
- The Royal Armouries The Making of a Museum. With Guy Wilson ISBN 0-948092-26-2.
- New Towns (Architectural Design, No 111). With Maggie Toy.
- AD Milton keynes 1.2.3 Volumes Profiles Architectural Magazine 1973-4-5.
- The Architecture and Planning of Milton Keynes ISBN 0851397352
