= Central Milton Keynes shopping centre =

Shopping centre in Milton Keynes, England

The Central Milton Keynes shopping complex
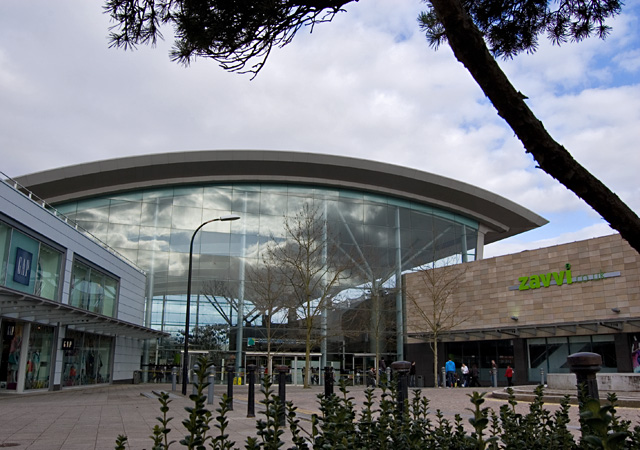
- The arc joining Midsummer Place to the Centre:MK
- Interactive map of area around the Centre:MK
- Location: Milton Keynes, England
- Coordinates: 52.0436°N 0.7555°W
- Opened: 25 September 1979
- Developer: Milton Keynes Development Corporation
- Owner: Prudential, Hermes Investment Management (thecentre:mk); NewRiver (Midsummer Place)
- Num. of stores: over 220 (thecentre:mk) over 50 (Midsummer Place)
- Floor area: 1,790,000 sq ft (166,000 m^{2}), building length: 700 m
- Floors: One main access floor, larger stores have two or three internally.
- Parking: over 17,000 spaces nearby
- Website: centremk.com

The Central Milton Keynes shopping area is a regional shopping centre located in Milton Keynes, Buckinghamshire, England which is about 50 miles (80 km) north-west of London. It comprises two adjacent shopping centres, thecentre:mk (a Grade II listed building, originally named the 'Shopping Building') which opened in 1979, and Midsummer Place, opened in 2000.

The centre:mk is anchored by John Lewis and Marks & Spencer. As of December 2024, the centre:mk (alone) is the 12th largest shopping centre in the UK, with the size of 133,416 m^{2} (1,436,080 sq ft).

== Development ==
The Milton Keynes Development Corporation (MKDC) began work on the Shopping Building in 1973. It was to be the largest building of Central Milton Keynes, and was built at almost the highest point in the "New City". (Note: Woodhill is ten metres higher.) The architects were Derek Walker, Stuart Mosscrop, and Christopher Woodward, who had been Chief and senior architects at the Development Corporation; and the engineers were Felix Samuely and Partners. The shopping area was opened on 25 September 1979 by Prime Minister Margaret Thatcher. The building's sleek envelope accommodated 130 shops and six department stores, arranged along two parallel day-lit arcades, planted with sub-tropical and temperate trees.

== Architecture ==
The cool, elegant, steel framed design was influenced by the architecture of Ludwig Mies van der Rohe and echoed glazed shopping streets or arcades on the grand scale of the Galleria in Milan. The designer, Derek Walker, also likened it to the Crystal Palace. It was described in 1993 as "still the best-looking if no longer the biggest shopping centre in the British Isles". It is unusual for second generation shopping centres in Europe for the amount of daylight allowed into the public areas, for the rigorous control of retail facias along the arcades themselves, for its public art, the unusually high level of accessibility for visitors with limited mobility (and other users laden with children and shopping), the lavish extent of the public spaces and their interior planting (reduced since the buildings was completed) and for the cool mirrored exterior.

Public access to all units is flush and at ground level. Some of the shops e.g. John Lewis and Next have two or three floors inside. A service road for deliveries runs above the shops, so that large trucks may service the shops at roof level, removing the peripheral service roads and loading bays at ground level that mar so many large shopping malls. This means all deliveries take place out of view of the shoppers, though tall trucks can sometimes be seen from the arcades as they pass at high level.

The internal landscaping was very lavish with 47 plant beds with large plants and trees; temperate in the northerly arcade and semi-tropical in the southerly one. The planters were finished in the same travertine as the floor, but approximately one third of these have been removed since the building was opened, with consequent loss of both planting and seating for shoppers, to accommodate market barrows and stalls.

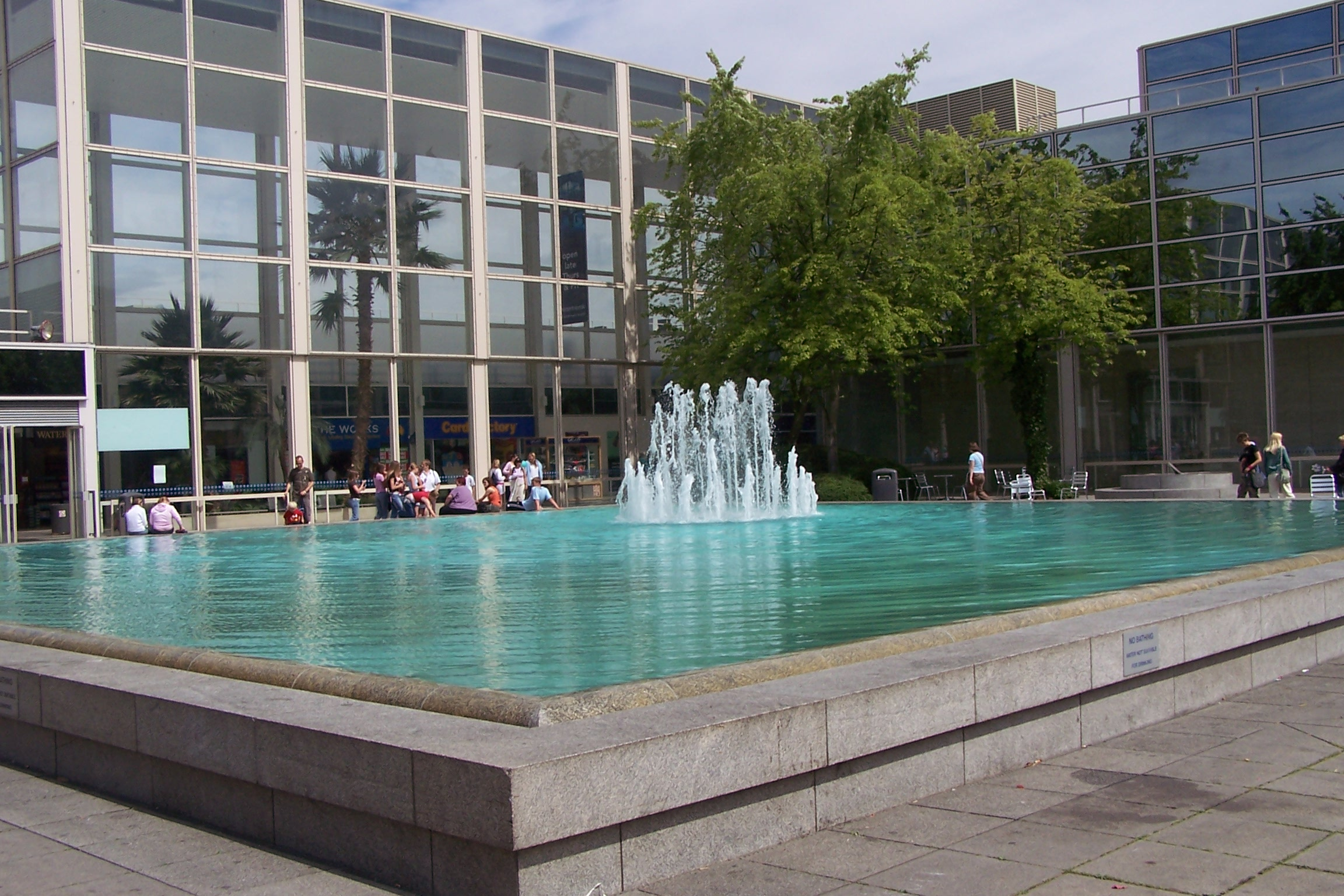
Fountain in Queen's Court before 2009/10 redevelopment

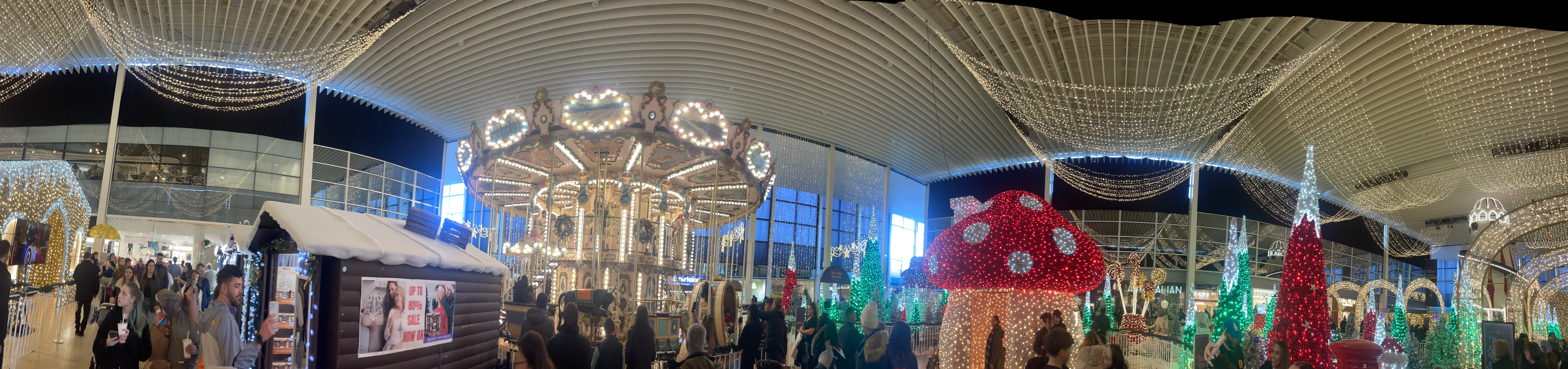
A panoramic view of the annual Christmas Display in Middleton Hall

There are two large public areas, intended as civic open spaces, one indoors and one open air. The open-air garden square (Queen's Court) lies between Midsummer Arcade and Silbury Arcade, just west of mid-point, designed as a relaxation space for visitors and redeveloped in 2009/10. The indoor space (Middleton Hall) is 1,800-square-metre exhibition space near the east end. During 2010, Middleton Hall was used as a temporary home venue for the Milton Keynes Lions basketball team, housing a 1,200-seat arena.

In a central space outside the shopping building (but contained by it on three sides) is an open-air market, much of it under Secklow Gate (a flyover that gives first-floor service access to the shops' loading bays, as well as a useful North-South route).

== Extensions ==
In 1993, the building was extended at the western end, over much of what had been City Square to the even greater length of 720 meters. In architectural style this extension is similar to the original, though the join can be detected internally by the low ceilings and dark corridors in the extension, quite unlike the handsome arcades of the original phase. Following extension this was documented in the 1997 Guinness Book of Records to contain the longest shopping mall in the world.

=== Midsummer Place ===
Midsummer Place is effectively a southwards extension of the centre but is owned and operated independently. (It was a planning requirement that it should not physically attach to the original building, so there is an approximately one metre gap between them). Midsummer Place was designed by GMW Architects of London and opened in 2000. This extension is built across (and thus closing) Midsummer Boulevard, using a covered and enclosed plaza that contains some demountable kiosks: it is a further planning requirement that the Boulevard alignment should remain free of structures so as to be capable (in principle) of being reopened as a thoroughfare at some future date.

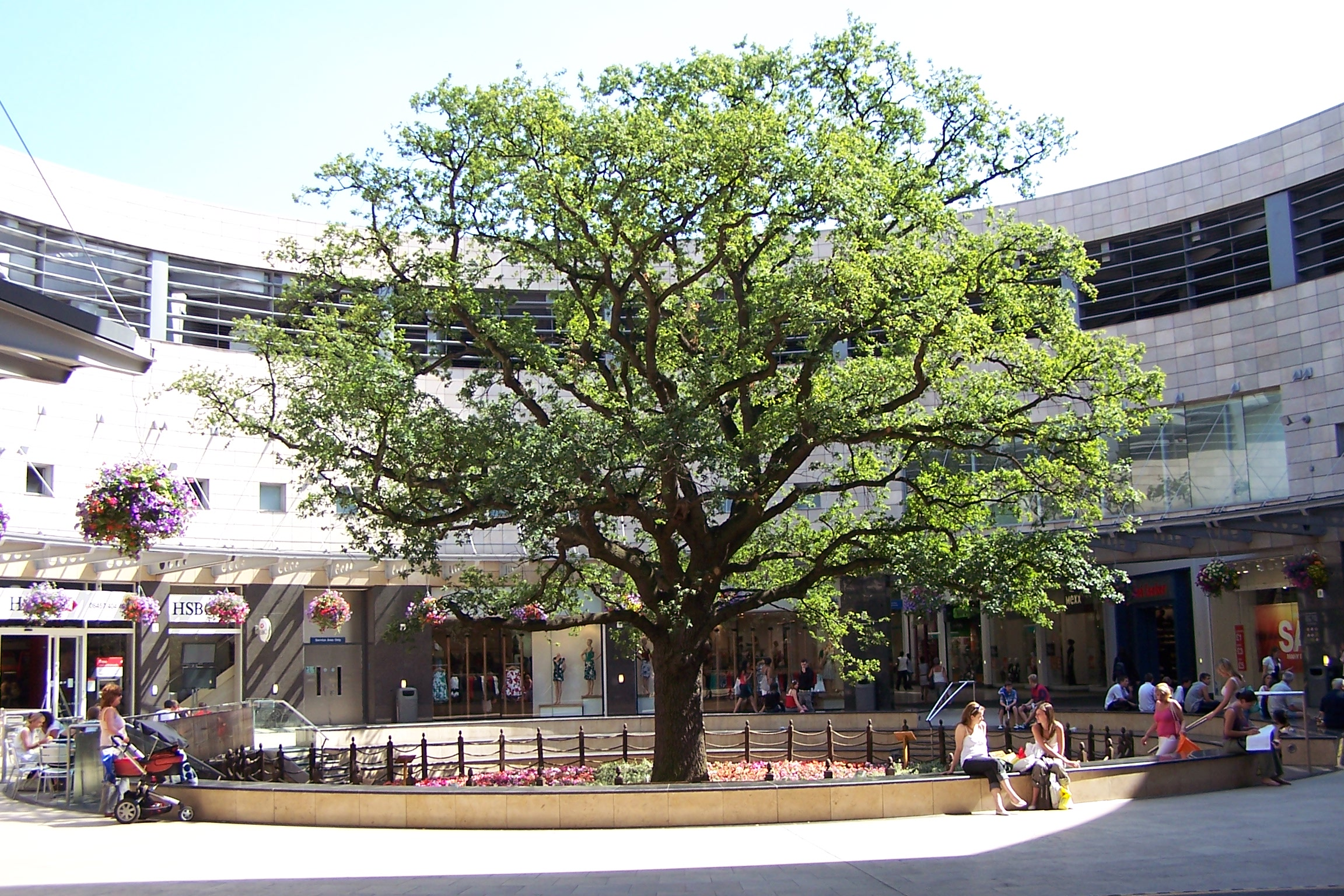
Oak Court in Midsummer Place in 2006; the tree later died due to a drainage problem and was felled

The new centre was constructed in part around an existing oak tree that survived being built around (at a 0.6 metres (2 ft) higher level) until it began to decline in 2005. In 2015 it was found that the tree's roots were often immersed in water during periods of rain, due to the inappropriate removal of drainage pipes, and that the tree had effectively "drowned". The tree was felled, and its timber preserved.

In March 2013, Intu Properties plc bought the property from its original owners, Legal & General, for £250.5 million. In June 2020, Intu Properties went into administration. In September 2021, property group 'Ellandi' took control of the centre. In April 2021, the new managers of the site announced that its original name, 'Midsummer Place', was being reinstated.

== Art ==
View of animated feature clock by author Kit Williams. Video.

A kinetic sculpture (Circle of Light, 1980) by Liliane Lijn hangs from the ceiling of Midsummer Arcade. The mechanism has not operated for many years. It was originally floodlit at night and is on the axis of the midsummer sun on which Midsummer Boulevard is roughly orientated.

Silbury Arcade contains three bronze figures (Dream Flight, Flying Carpet and High Flyer, 1989) by Philomena Davidson Davis, former president of the Royal British Society of Sculptors. Nearby, in the "guest services lounge", a mosaic pavement (c. AD 320) from Bancroft Roman Villa is on display. These works were previously sited in Queen's Court.

Before being redeveloped, Queen's Court also contained:

- a sundial and associated bollards (Bollards, 1979) by Tim Minett

Oak Court contains:

- a stainless steel sculpture (Acorns and Leaves, 2000) by Tim Ward
- a replica of the Concrete Cows (1978) by Liz Leyh

The Midsummer Place building contains:

- a bronze seat (Sitting on History, 1996) by Bill Woodrow
- a stained-glass window (2000) by Anne Smyth
- an animated clock with a frog that blows bubbles (2000), conceived by Kit Williams, and similar to the clock at Telford Shopping Centre.

== Pop video ==
In 1981, the building and its surrounding vicinity were used for the filming of the music video Wired for Sound by Cliff Richard. Filming took place at the eastern end of Midsummer Arcade (the distinctive tiling outside the John Lewis department store being clearly visible), outside Norfolk House and in nearby underpasses. The building was also used as a location for still photography on the first self-titled album by Duran Duran.

== Grade II listing for original building ==
In November 2008, English Heritage (the Government's advisor on historic buildings) recommended to the Culture Minister that the original building be designated a Grade II listed building which, the owners said, would curtail severely their ability to alter it if awarded. The Twentieth Century Society responded that this belief is unfounded. It was listed in July 2010.

It won a number of prizes when constructed and remains a valued element of Milton Keynes.

In July 2010, the Heritage Minister, John Penrose, advised the owners that he had decided that the building merited a Grade II listing, to applause from the 20th Century Society and other conservationists.

== Robbery ==
On 1 December 2009 an armed robbery occurred at a jewellery store near Middleton Hall. Three suspects sprayed CS gas in the area, injuring 2 people. After firing several blank shots, the suspects fled the area after stealing roughly £1 million in watches. The shopping centre reopened 2 days later.

== Future ==
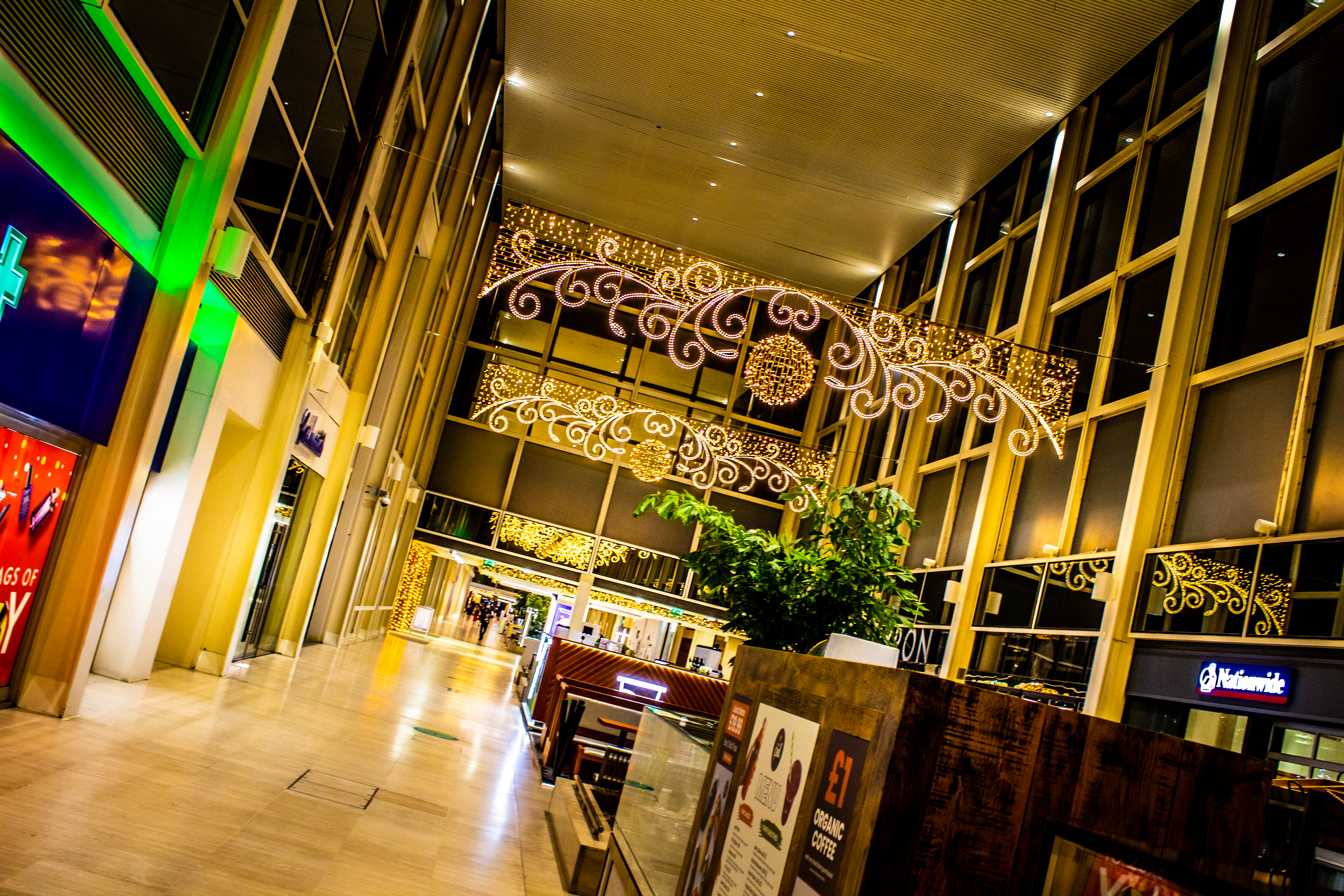
Interior of the shopping mall on Christmas Eve 2021, after renovations.

The Milton Keynes Partnership and the centre owners aim to expand thecentre:mk. In the original plan (suspended since mid 2007), Phase 1 of the redevelopment programme would include a new department store on the south side (for which the outdoor market would be moved southwards and Secklow Gate flyover would be closed), the colonnade on the west of Middleton Hall would be removed by expanding the shops into it, Crown Walk would be opened to allow pedestrian access through the centre after the shops close (shortening evening journeys on foot considerably), a restaurant quarter would open in a re-landscaped Queens Court, and an "enhanced" entrance would be created on the north side. Phase 2 may include expansion at the eastern end. However, these plans were put on hold by the centre owners and only the work in Queens Court went ahead.

The plans are controversial because they would mean the loss of the minimalist appearance of the building, the clarity of the layout and public spaces in the building. The closure of Secklow Gate was even proposed, removing the rooftop loading facility that is such an important feature of the building. Additionally, objectors say that the plans to erect dwellings in the central area run the risk of hampering movement around and in and out of the centre as well as spoiling views of the shopping building.

Independently of the Centre management plans, Milton Keynes Council transport strategy calls for Midsummer Boulevard to be re-opened through the Midsummer Place to thecentre:mk to facilitate a "public transport spine" bus route along the Boulevard, from the station to Campbell Park.
