= Fred Roche =

General manager of MKDC and architect

Frederick Lloyd Roche CBE
- Born: 11 March 1931
- Died: 9 November 1992 (aged 61)
- Education: Regent Street Polytechnic (now University of Westminster)
- Occupation: Architect
- Spouse: Valerie (second wife)
- Children: 2 children (1st marriage); 1 daughter (2nd marriage)
- Buildings: Runcorn Shopping City

Frederick Lloyd Roche, CBE (11 March 1931 – 9 November 1992), was a British architect who worked on the programme of new towns in the United Kingdom. He was Chief Architect of Runcorn Development Corporation from 1965 to 1970 and General Manager of the Milton Keynes Development Corporation from 1970 to 1981. In 1985, he was appointed a CBE.

== Career ==
Roche trained at Regent Street Polytechnic (now University of Westminster) and qualified in 1955. He remained in London for three years working as a housing architect and moved to Coventry in 1958 where he became an architect specialising in schools. In 1963, he returned to housing when he became principal development architect for the Midlands Housing Consortium.

In 1965, Roche became chief architect and planning officer for Runcorn new town. He led on the design of the new town centre, Runcorn Shopping City.

In 1970, he moved to Milton Keynes in north Buckinghamshire to be General Manager of the Development Corporation at the age of 39. He oversaw the major growth of the 'new city' through to 1981.

Thereafter, he joined with Terence Conran to establish the new architecture and planning consultancy, Conran Roche. The company developed a number of projects during the 1980s, including Butler's Wharf and Michelin House in London. He retired as managing director in 1988 due to ill health.

== Awards and recognition ==
In 1985 Roche was appointed a CBE. He was a vice-president of the Royal Institute of British Architects from 1983 to 1985 and honorary treasurer from 1985 to 1986.

He is commemorated in Milton Keynes by having a linear civic garden named for him.
