= Milton Keynes Development Corporation =

Arms-length state body

- Type: Arms-length state body
- Industry: Town planning and development
- Founded: 23 January 1967; 59 years ago
- Defunct: 31 March 1992; 34 years ago
- Successor: Commission for New Towns
- Headquarters: Wavendon Tower, Wavendon, Milton Keyunes

Milton Keynes Development Corporation (MKDC) was a development corporation operating from 1967 to 1992 to oversee the planning and early development of Milton Keynes, then a planned new town in Buckinghamshire, midway between London and Birmingham. At designation, the area within the designated area was home to some 40,000 people in the existing towns and villages.

== Establishment ==
MKDC was established on 23 January 1967 to deliver a "new city" that would be the modern interpretation of the garden city movement concepts first expressed by Ebenezer Howard 60 years earlier. It was headquartered in Wavendon Tower, in the village of Wavendon on the eastern edge of the city.

Situated in the north of Buckinghamshire near the borders with Northamptonshire and Bedfordshire, Milton Keynes would be a "city in the trees" – the planning guideline for residential areas outside Central Milton Keynes was "no building higher than the highest tree" – at a time when multi-storey flats and office blocks were dominating the redevelopment of most inner city areas and many large towns. (Note: The actual design guidance declared that commercial building heights in the centre should not exceed six stories, with a limit of three stories for houses (elsewhere).)

The vision that the urban design consultants set out in The Plan for Milton Keynes implied that the architects and engineers should learn from the mistakes made in the earlier new towns and build a city that people would be proud to call their home. It was placed where it would have the advantages of a direct motorway (the M1) and rail link (the West Coast Main Line) with the capital city, London, and the second city Birmingham; both 50–60 miles (80–100 km) away. The task of MKDC was to give effect to the grand principles of the Plan.

== Personnel ==
Following publication of the Draft Master Plan for Milton Keynes, the government appointed Lord Campbell of Eskan ("Jock" Campbell) to chair the board of the new Development Corporation. For the critical local consultation period, Walter Ismay became the corporation's first Chief Executive. Kenneth Wren, then the Borough Treasurer in Banbury, was invited to London to meet Lord Campbell and became MKDC’s first Chief Finance Officer in early 1968. The Board invited as consultants Richard Llewellyn Davies and partners, who produced the overall development plan, with its grid pattern of distributor roads at roughly 1 kilometre (0.6 mi) intervals. When the planning enquiries were over, it was time for a different type of CEO and Fred Roche took over in 1970. Llewellyn Davies, with colleagues Walter Bor, John de Monchaux and Suzanne Beauchamp de Monchaux continued to contribute to the development of strategy.

In 1980, Frank Henshaw took over from Fred Roche. Lord Campbell was succeeded by Sir Henry Chilver in 1983.

== Promotional events ==
MKDC promoted the Homeworld 81 exhibition in 1981, thirty-six houses showcasing "the latest developments in housing from international designers, architects and builders", and Energy World, a demonstration project of 51 low-energy houses completed in 1986.

== Supersession ==
The Government wound up MKDC in 1992 after 25 years, transferring control to the Commission for New Towns, latterly part of English Partnerships, which subsequently merged with the Housing Corporation to become the Homes and Communities Agency (HCA). Control over design passed to Milton Keynes Partnership which remained a major landowner in the city. Design criteria became more similar to those being applied by the HCA on sites it owned across the country. Public parks were transferred to the Milton Keynes Parks Trust, a registered charity.

== See also ==
- History of Milton Keynes#Milton Keynes Development Corporation: designing a city for 250,000 people
- New Towns Acts#New Towns Act 1965

== Sources ==
- Bendixson, Terence; Platt, John (1992). Milton Keynes: Image and reality. Cambridge: Granta Editions. ISBN 978-0906782729.
- Clapson, Mark (2014). The Plan for Milton Keynes. New York: Routledge. ISBN 9780415645003.
- Llewelyn-Davies; Weeks; Forestier-Walker; Bor (1970). The Plan for Milton Keynes, Volume 1. Wavendon: Milton Keynes Development Corporation. ISBN 978-0-903379-00-7.
