= Bancroft Roman Villa =

Roman villa in Milton Keynes, England

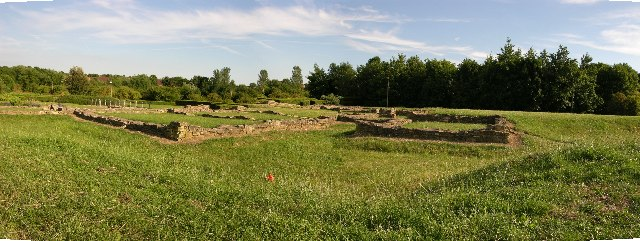
- Site of Bancroft Roman Villa
- Zoomable map of the area around the villa
- 52.05675°N 0.79817°W grid reference SP827403
- Type: Romano-British villa and farm
- Location: Bancroft, Milton Keynes
- Region: South East England

History
- Built: 1st century
- Abandoned: 5th century

Bancroft Roman Villa is a Roman villa in the Bancroft district of Milton Keynes in Buckinghamshire, England. Originally a winged-corridor house, the villa eventually became a grand building with mosaics and a formal garden. The site has been conserved, with the principal rooms marked out and the fish-pond reconstructed. One of the mosaics is on display in Central Milton Keynes Shopping Centre.

== History ==
The first farmhouse was constructed in the late 1st century, located downhill from where there had previously been an Iron-Age settlement. In the 2nd century a temple or mausoleum was constructed on the hilltop. Around 170 AD the farmstead was destroyed by fire, but by the late 3rd century it had been replaced by a larger house. In the 4th century major renovations were undertaken. Geometric mosaics were added to many rooms and the main bath-suite was rebuilt and enlarged. In front of the villa a formal garden was laid out together with an ornamental fish-pond. On the top of the hill, the mausoleum was demolished and a circular shrine was built nearby.

== Excavation and display ==
The villa was partially excavated in the 1970s, and then more fully in 1983-7, becoming one of the most extensively excavated Roman villas in Britain. The villa has since been reburied to ensure its preservation, but the principal rooms have been marked out on the ground with modern stonework and the fish-pond has been reconstructed. The mosaics were removed from the site and one was prominently displayed in Queen's Court, CMK Shopping Centre. Due to 'redevelopment' of Queen's Court, the mosaic was remounted subsequently in the "guest services lounge" of the centre.
