= Central Milton Keynes =

Civil parish and central business district of Milton Keynes, England

Coordinates: 52.0423°N 0.7598°W

- Civil parish and central business district
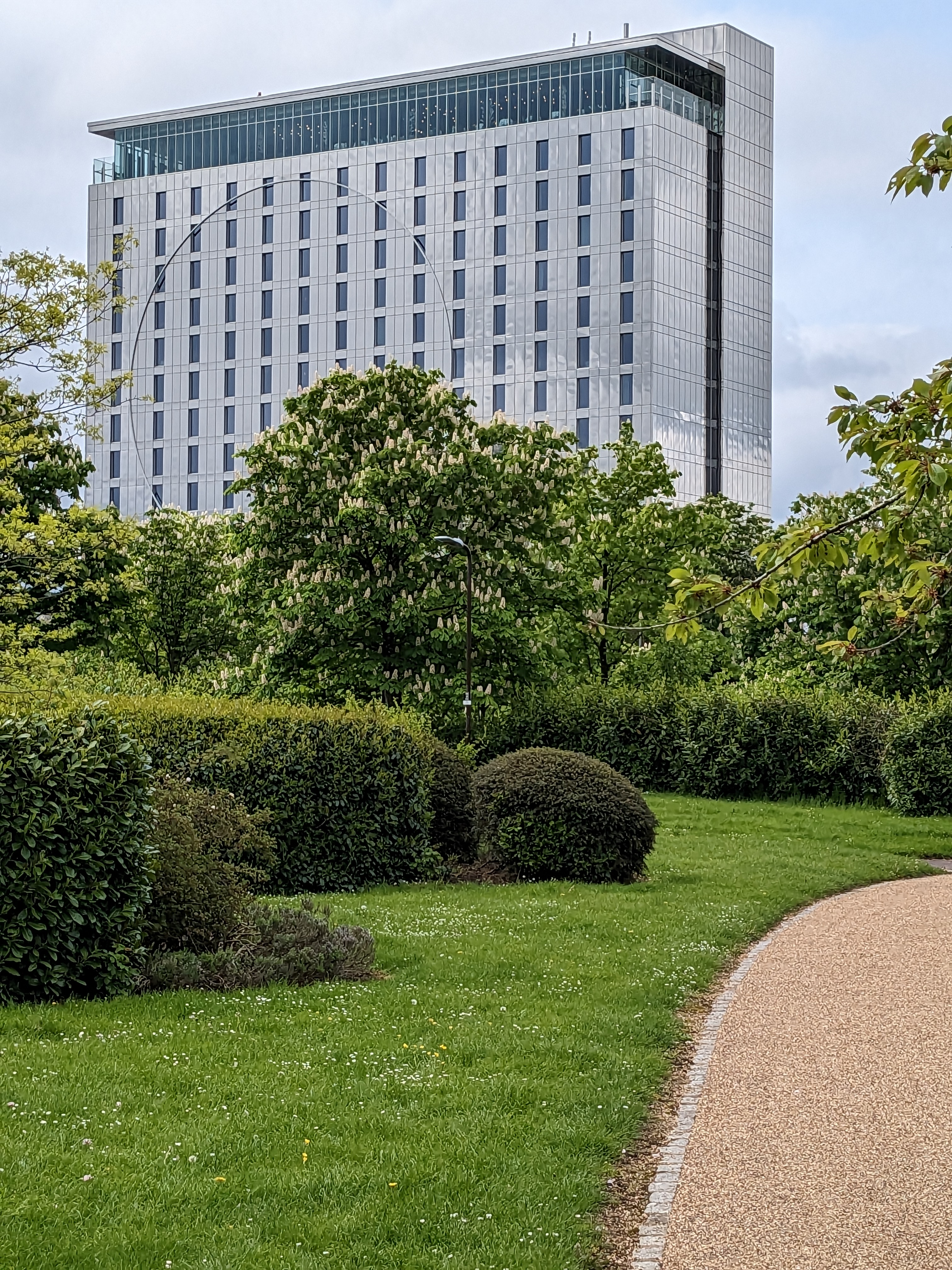
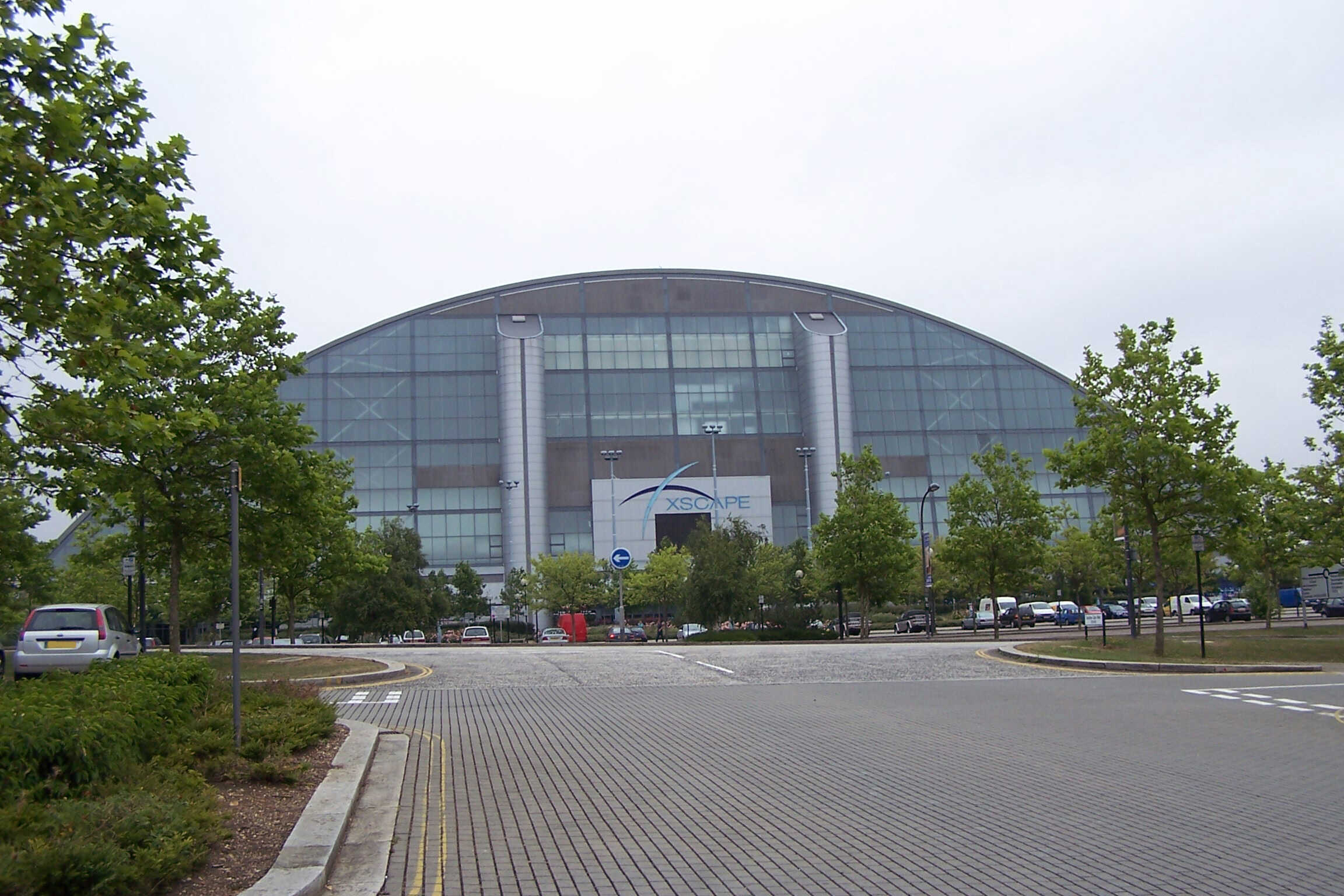
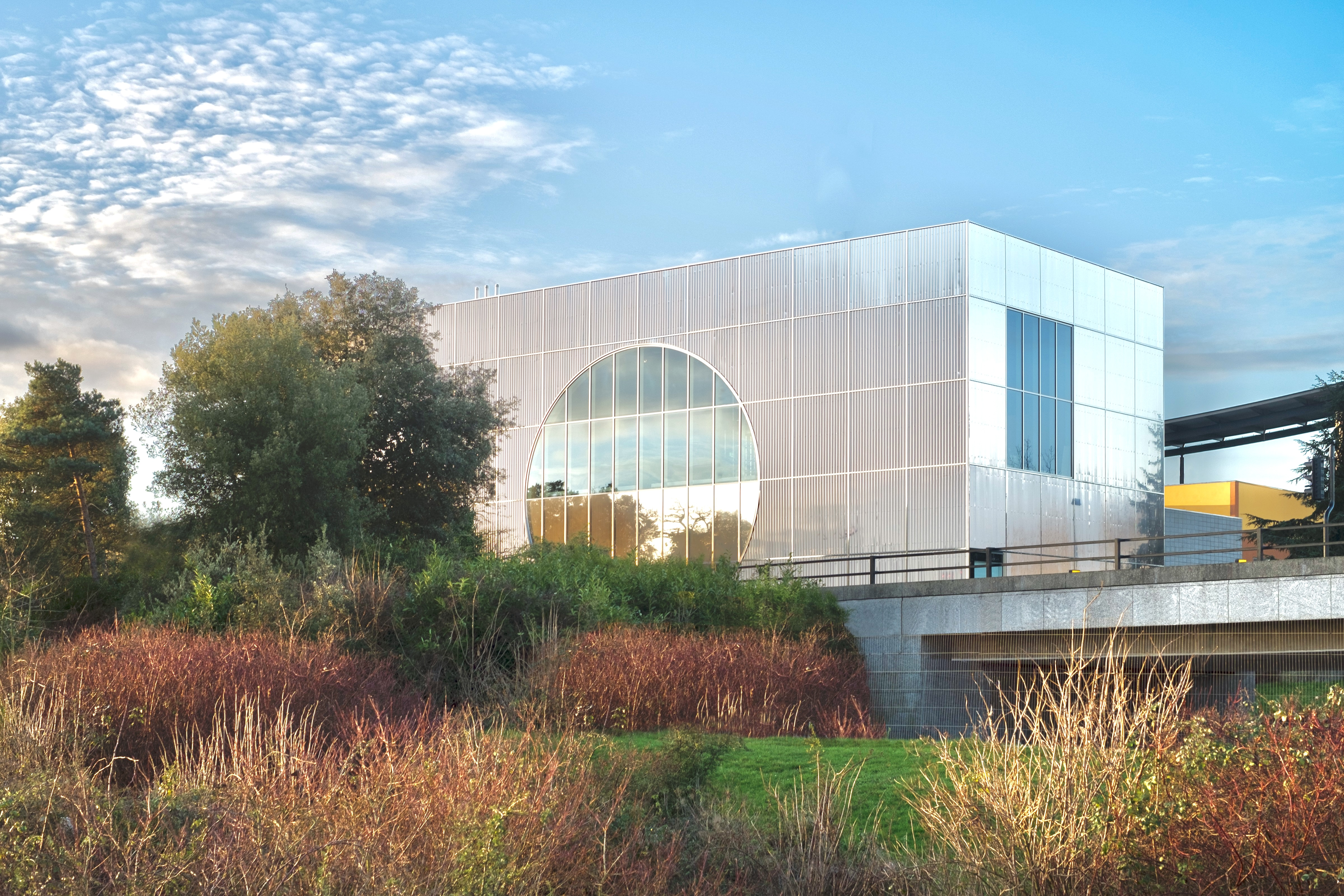
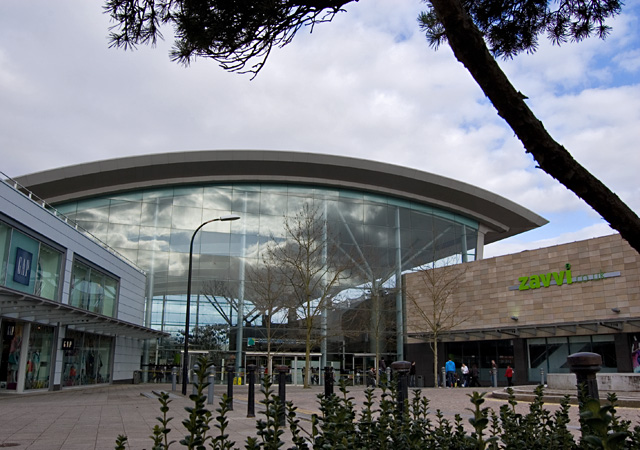
- Top to bottom, left to right: Hotel La Tour from Campbell Park; the Xscape dome; Milton Keynes Gallery; the arc (almost) joining the Midsummer Place and the Centre:MK

- Location within Buckinghamshire
- Interactive map of Central Milton Keynes
- Area: 0.9 sq mi (2.3 km^{2})
- Population: 4,704 (2021 census)
  - Density: 5,227/sq mi (2,018/km^{2})
- OS grid reference: SP851389
- Civil parish: Central Milton Keynes
- District: City of Milton Keynes
- Unitary authority: Milton Keynes City Council
- Ceremonial county: Buckinghamshire
- Region: South East
- Country: England
- Sovereign state: United Kingdom
- Post town: MILTON KEYNES
- Postcode district: MK9
- Dialling code: 01908
- Police: Thames Valley
- Fire: Buckinghamshire
- Ambulance: South Central
- UK Parliament: Milton Keynes North
- Website: cmktowncouncil.gov.uk

Central Milton Keynes is the central business district of Milton Keynes, Buckinghamshire, England. It is a civil parish in its own right, with a town council, making it one of the constituent towns of the city. (Note: The others are Bletchley, Fenny Stratford, Stony Stratford and Wolverton. In addition, Newport Pagnell and Woburn Sands are part of the Milton Keynes urban area but were not included in the 1967 New Town designation order.)

The district is approximately 3.5 km (2.2 mi) long by 1 km (0.6 mi) wide and occupies some of the highest land in the city. It contains (behind the Central Library) the historic site of the moot hill for Secklow (or Sigelai) Hundred. It is the site of the central retail, business, law enforcement and governmental districts, Milton Keynes Central railway station and around 2,000 residential dwellings.

== Topology ==
Occupying 342 hectares (850 acres), the district lies between Portway (H5, A509) to the north, the West Coast Main Line and A5 to the west, Childs Way (H6) to the south and the Grand Union Canal to the east. It is crossed from north to south by (in west to east order, major roads only) Grafton Gate (V6), Witan Gate, Saxon Gate (V7) and Secklow Gate, and Marlborough Street. It is crossed from west to east (in north to south order, major roads only) by Silbury Boulevard, Midsummer Boulevard and Avebury Boulevard. Midsummer Boulevard is the primary spine.

The district rests like a saddle across a long north-south ridge with its highest point here at a little over 110 metres (360 ft), falling east to 75 metres near the Grand Union Canal and 85 metres near the Central railway station. This area is almost (Note: Oakhill in Shenley Brook End, on the south-west edge of the city, is slightly higher.) the highest point of Milton Keynes and includes the site of Secklow Mound, the moot mound (meeting place) for the Secklow Hundred and a scheduled monument, just behind the central library.

=== Astronomical alignment ===
Midsummer sunrise is somewhere to the east – not actually on the alignment of Midsummer Boulevard: [...] But it was a good urban myth to lay down. Let's call that road Midsummer Boulevard because you could tell people that on Midsummer's Day, the sun rises at the end of it, which it nearly does. And the other two? We'll refer to our Anglo-Saxon heritage, because this is not an American new town... It's an English new town, in an English place, on a Common, where three Saxon Hundreds used to meet at that little mound behind the library. So we refer to Avebury and Silbury as being part of our historical and cultural references.

— David Lock

I've always been interested in astronomy. It's something you've got to know as an architect when you're designing buildings: where [does] the sun rise in winter? Where [does] it set in summer? You've got to know that, otherwise you don't know where you're putting your building in relation to the cosmos. That goes in pretty early.

— Stuart Mosscrop, Head Architect for CMK

While still on the drawing board, planners noticed that the planned main streets in the proposed city centre would almost frame the rising sun on Midsummer's Day. (Note: Only when seen uphill along Midsummer Boulevard from Midsummer Roundabout near the railway station.) This story has become embellished over time and, according to subsequent reports, they consulted Greenwich Observatory to obtain the exact angle required at the latitude of CMK, and persuaded the engineers to shift the grid of roads a few degrees in response. Physical reality does not match this report. From the highest point on Midsummer Boulevard, where the eastward horizon is unobstructed, the sunrise at 'first flash' is not aligned with the Boulevard. In reality, the sun is somewhat elevated before alignment occurs, 40 minutes later.

== East of Marlborough Street: Campbell Park ==
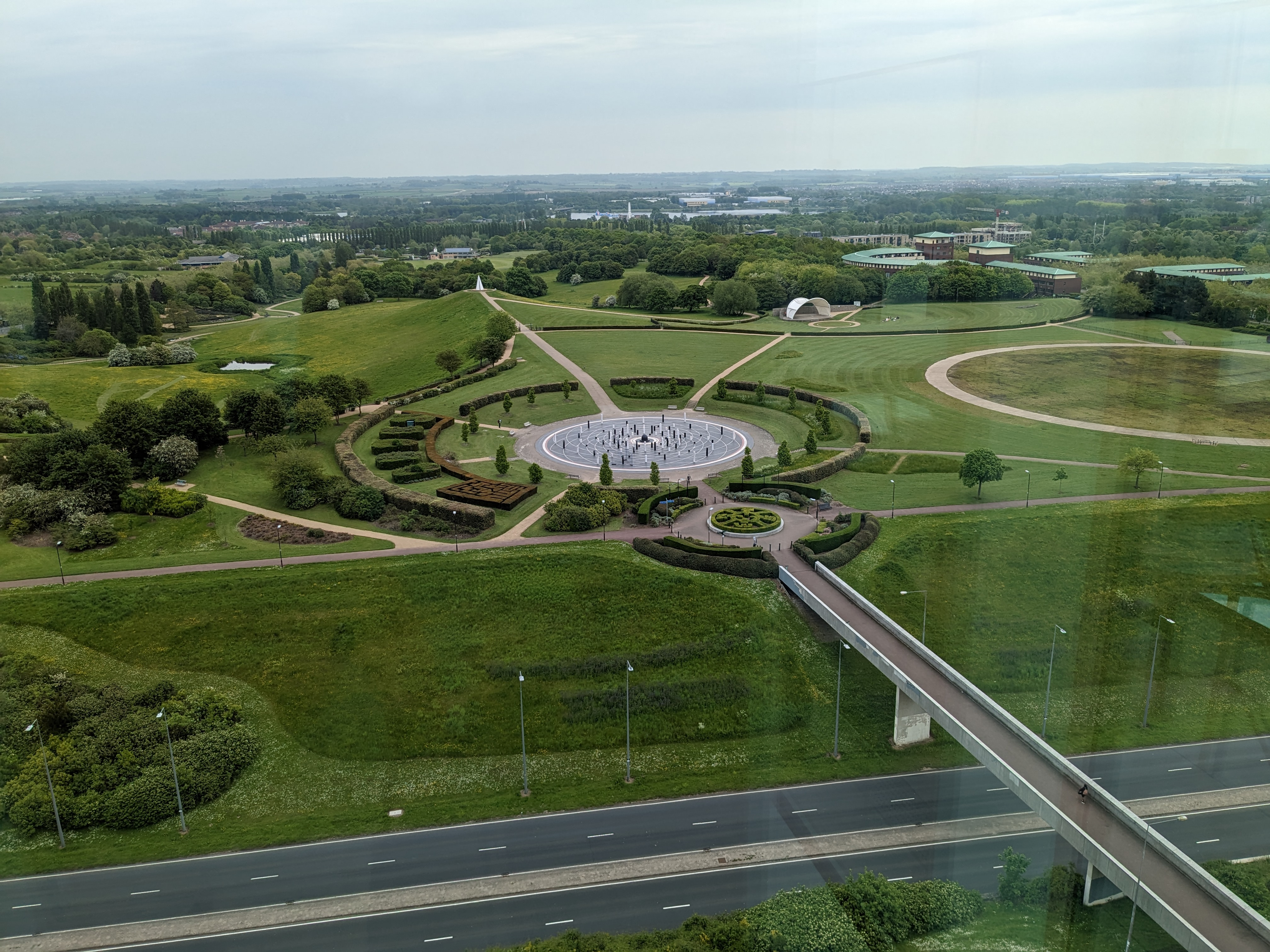
Campbell Park from Hotel La Tour

The park, with housing either side, takes up the larger part of the district. It was named in honour of the first chairman of Milton Keynes Development Corporation, Lord Campbell of Eskan. It stretches just east of the shops and theatre down to the Grand Union Canal. Among the features of the park is a belvedere with extensive views over Bedfordshire to the east and the Light Pyramid, a modern beacon. There is also a cricket ground with pavilion. The Milton Keynes Parks Trust, which manages the park, grazes sheep on it to keep the vegetation under control.

Marlborough Street (V8, B4034) runs in a cutting through the ridge, bridged by a redway (shared path) between the main centre and the park.

== West of Marlborough Street, east of Saxon Gate: the main retail/service/entertainment district ==
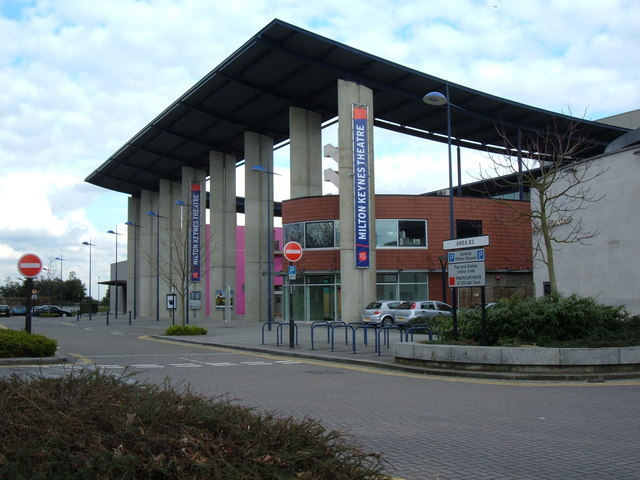
Milton Keynes Theatre (portico)

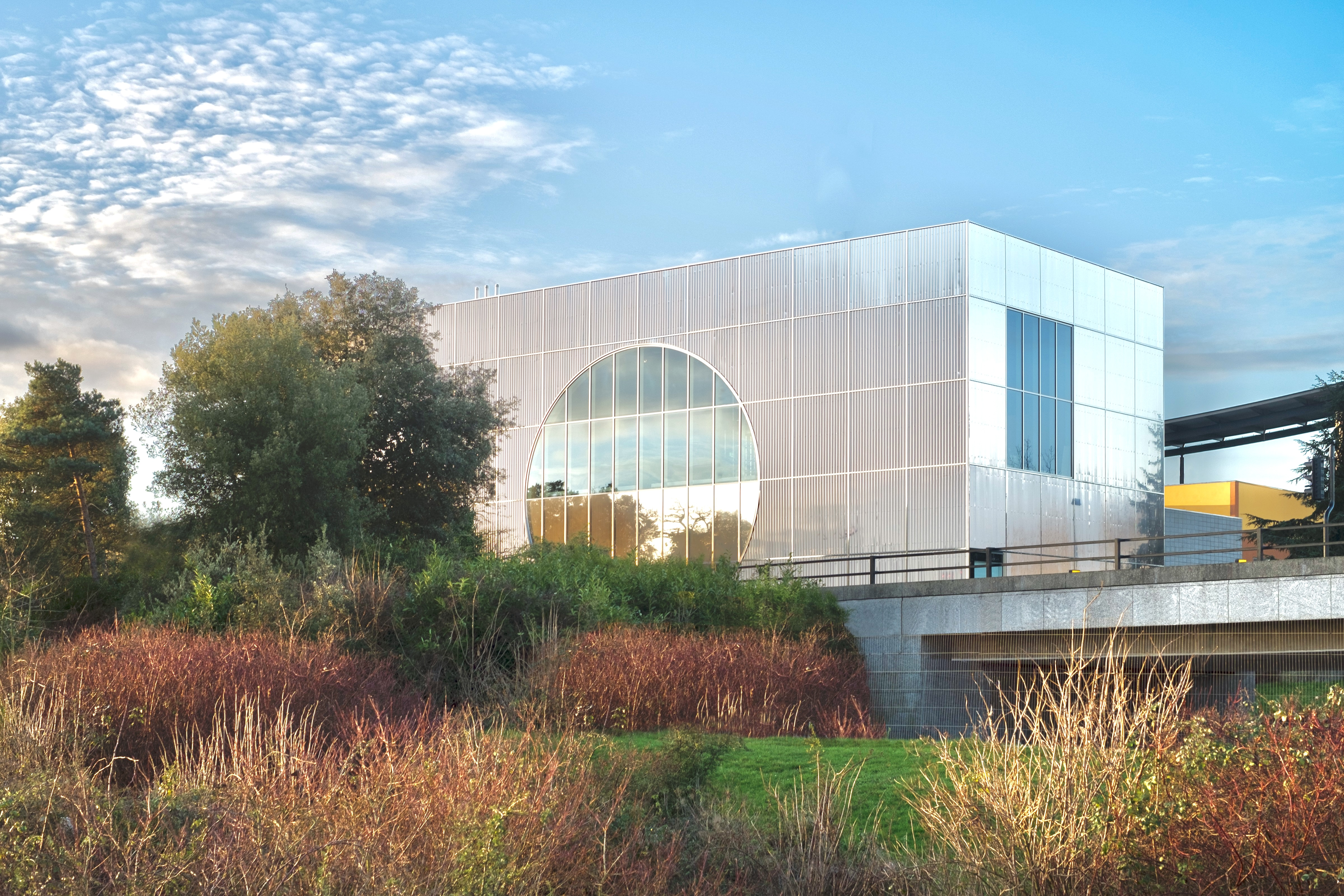
MK Gallery

This area is defined by the Marlborough Street (V8, B4034) to the north-east, the Saxon Gate (Saxon Street, V7) to the south-west, Portway (H5, A509) to the north-west and Childs Way (H6) to the south-east. The core retail district is further delimited by Silbury and Avebury Boulevards, with civic and office developments outside the Boulevards.

The retail district includes thecentre:mk and Midsummer Place (the covered high streets that are the Central Milton Keynes shopping centres).

The Secklow Mound (the original Anglo-Saxon centre of the district), the central library, civic offices of Milton Keynes City Council and other commercial offices are on the north side of Silbury Boulevard, which separates them from the shops. Midsummer Boulevard runs along the south side of the Centre:MK, separating the shops from the theatre, the municipal art gallery, Theatre District, the Xscape building, pubs, sports shops and other leisure facilities.

=== Shopping area ===
The central shopping area comprises two adjacent shopping centres, thecentre:mk (a grade II listed building, originally named the 'Shopping Building') which opened in 1979, and Midsummer Place opened in 2000. The centre:mk is anchored by John Lewis and Marks & Spencer.

=== Xscape ===
Xscape Milton Keynes is the main leisure complex in Central Milton Keynes consisting of SnoZone, a real snow indoor ski slope, a multiscreen cinema, and a number of shops, restaurants and night clubs. At the rear of the site is iFly, an indoor skydiving column.

=== Theatre and municipal art gallery ===
The municipal public art gallery, MK Gallery, presents exhibitions of international contemporary and classical art. The gallery was extended and remodelled in 2018/19 and includes an art-house cinema. It does not have a permanent collection.

The adjacent 1,400-seat Milton Keynes Theatre opened in 1999. The theatre has an unusual feature: the ceiling can be lowered closing off the third tier (gallery) to create a more intimate space for smaller-scale productions.

== West of Saxon Gate, east of Grafton Gate: the main business district ==
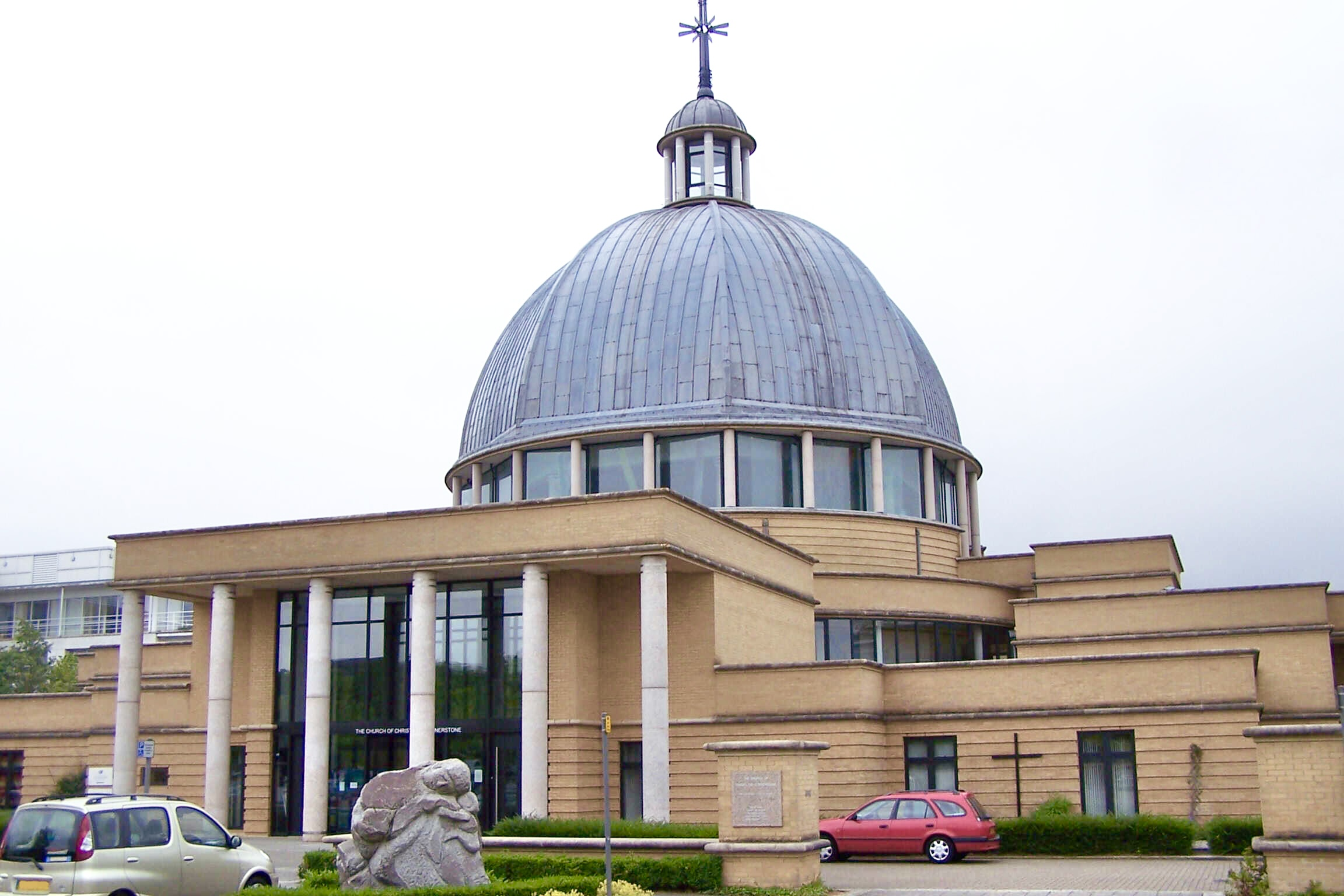
Ecumenical Church of Christ the Cornerstone

This area is also delimited by Portway and Childs Way. Saxon Gate separates it from the north-east area and Grafton Gate (Grafton Street, V7) marks its south-western edge. The domed Church of Christ the Cornerstone, law courts and police station are in the business district, beside the small linear Fred Roche Gardens and Grafton Park that provides its core.

=== Ecumenical Church of Christ the Cornerstone ===
This ecumenical church, the first such in the United Kingdom, is shared by the major Christian denominations to serve the office workers and the small resident population. (There are many denominational places of worship elsewhere in Milton Keynes).

=== The Hub:MK ===
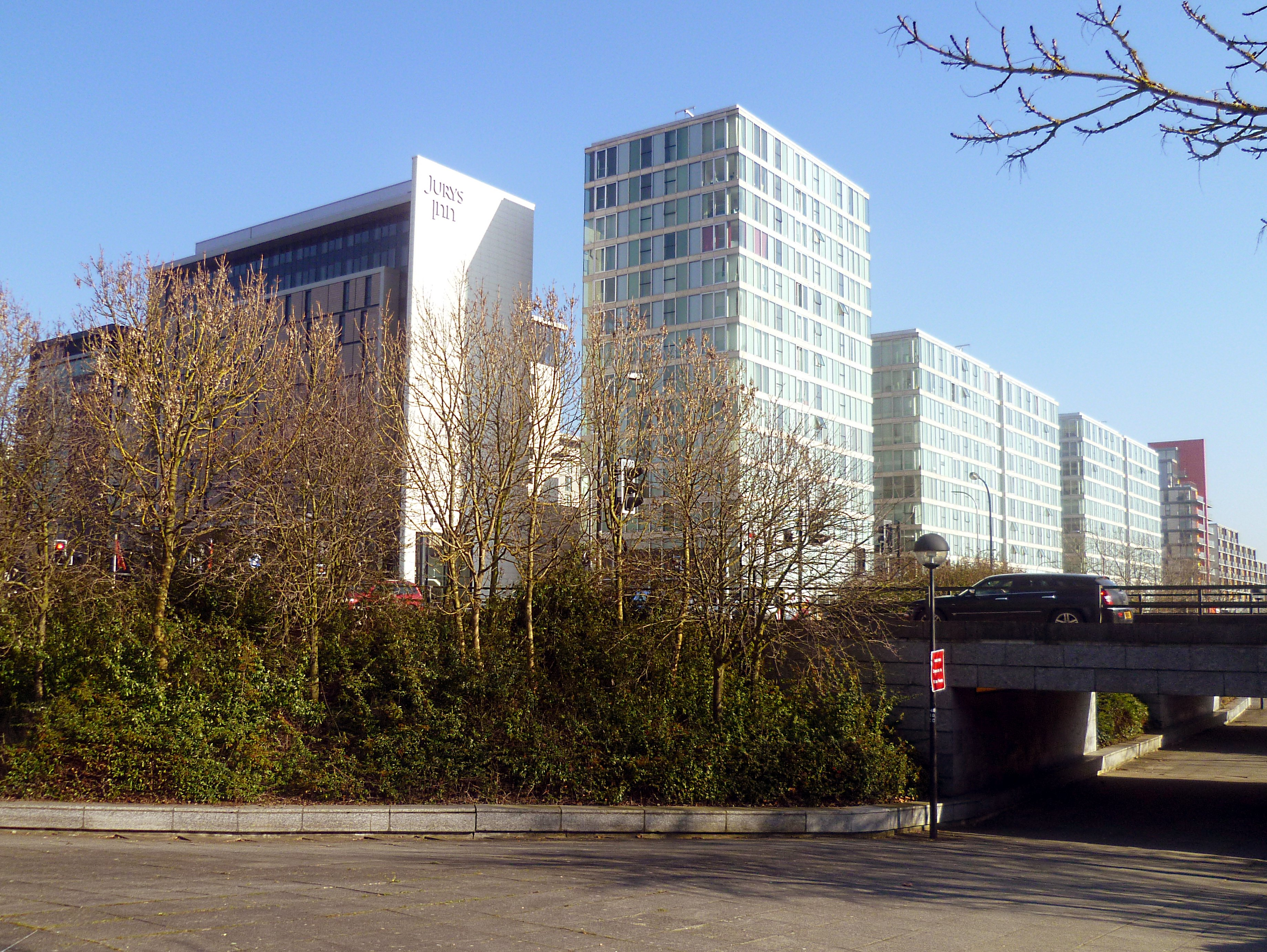
Multi-story apartments and Jury's Inn hotel form 'The Hub'

The Hub:MK is a 2006-built development between the station and the church, consisting of towers ranging between 10 and 14 storeys. The complex includes two high-rise hotels and a number of residential and office towers set around a central piazza. The site controversially involves the closure of one of the original pedestrian underpasses and is built right up to the edge of the adjacent boulevard, the first of several proposals that would have changed the unique character of Milton Keynes Development Corporation's original design for Central Milton Keynes. The work is part of the 'densification' plan that central government, through its agency English Partnerships, had ordained for Milton Keynes. Its height, also a major departure from the original low-rise design, makes it the third tallest building in Milton Keynes, beaten only by the 14-storey Xscape and the 18-storey Mellish Court in Bletchley.

To the south of the Hub lies a similar development named Vizion. This is similar in height and layout to the Hub but features a large Sainsbury's supermarket taking up the lower two floors with a rooftop garden above it. Vizion was completed in 2009, whilst the following year saw the completion of the 9-storey Pinnacle office development further west along Midsummer Boulevard from the Hub, closer to the railway station. The latter is distinctive for the slanted roof on its tallest section.

=== Higher education ===
Milton Keynes does not have its own conventional undergraduate university, although it is home to the campus of the Open University and hosts higher-education provision from several institutions. There is an outpost of the University of Bedfordshire in a CMK office block.

Cranfield University and the Milton Keynes City Council were partners in a detailed proposal to establish an undergraduate campus, code-named MK:U. The plan anticipated opening by 2023, with a campus in the block contained by Grafton Street / Avebury Boulevard / Witan Gate / Childs Way. In January 2019, the partners announced an international competition to design the new campus. In May 2019, Santander bank announced a 'seed funding' grant of £30M to help with building and initial running costs. On 4 July 2019, the shortlisted proposals for the campus were announced. On 30 July 2019, the evaluation panel announced that Hopkins Architects had produced the winning design.

Even though there were delays in constructing a permanent campus, MK:U began its operation in temporary locations in Central Milton Keynes. The first group of degree apprentices began studying in October 2021, focusing on subjects like digital technology, data science, and management. Also, there was an Innovation Hub that was created to support work between students and local businesses.

In 2022, the project did not receive government funding for the planned campus, so Milton Keynes Council and the Milton Keynes Development Partnership of Cranfield University gave their continued support. The partners continued to develop courses and degree apprenticeship programmes.

Cranfield University and Milton Keynes City Council's announced of the end of their formal partnership (for MK:U) in January 2024, although both said that they should continue to work together on higher education projects in the city. There were more than 400 students expected to be studying at MK:U from locations in the city centre that same year.

== West of Grafton Gate: the station district ==
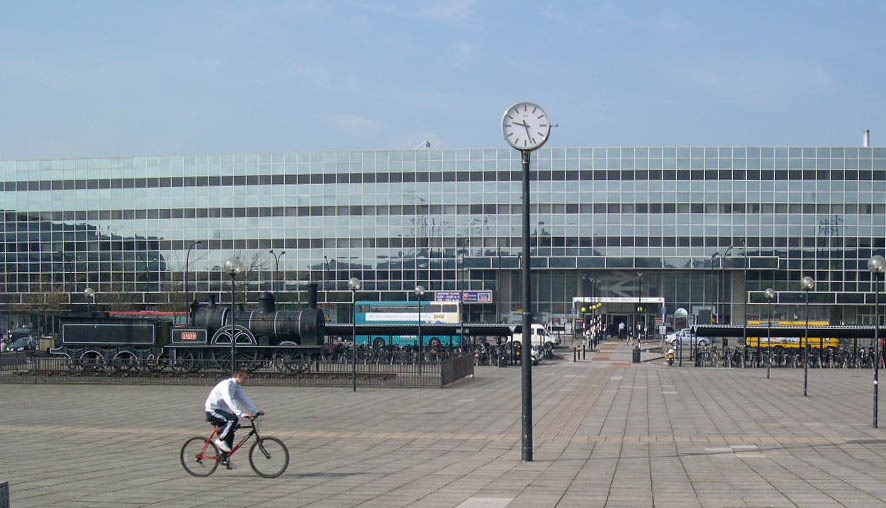
Milton Keynes Central railway station and Station Square

This district is defined by Saxon Gate (Saxon Street, V7) to the north-east, the West Coast Main Line (and the adjacent A5) to the south-west, Portway (H5, A509) to the north-west and Childs Way (H6) to the south-east. The core retail district is further delimited by Silbury and Avebury Boulevards, with civic and office developments outside the Boulevards.

The main feature of the district is the Milton Keynes Central railway station (an inter-city stop on the West Coast Main Line), one of the seven (Note: Aspley Guise, Bletchley, Bow Brickhill, Fenny Stratford, Milton Keynes Central, Woburn Sands and Wolverton) stations serving the Milton Keynes urban area. The buildings around Station Square house commercial offices, residential flats, food outlets a gym.

The bus bays located at the railway station forecourt provide a primary interchange point for the local bus services. Although National Express coach services operate from the Milton Keynes coachway (next to junction 14 of the M1 motorway), the long-distance bus services operate from here.

The former central bus station is located opposite the railway station but has not been operating as such since 1997. Beside the building, a young peoples' facility, 'the Buszy' includes an award-winning covered "urban" skate-boarding area, which has attracted international 'skaters' and film crews.

Also opposite the station, "Unity Place" is Santander UK's primary operations base outside London and nearby, Quadrant:MK has a similar function for Network Rail. To the south of the station, the 'Leisure Plaza' is another leisure and retail area that includes the Planet Ice Arena (home of Milton Keynes Lightning).

== Civil parish ==
Central Milton Keynes is a civil parish with a town council (subordinate to the city council), bordering (clockwise from north) Great Linford, Campbell Park (civil parish), (Note: Campbell Park itself is indeed in CMK parish. It was transferred there from Campbell Park CP but the latter's Community Council has retained the original name/) Loughton, and Bradwell. The parish was created in 2001, had a population of 2,726 according to the 2011 census, which had reached 4,704 by the 2021 census.

== ONS Urban sub-area ==
For the 2001 Census, the Office for National Statistics designated an urban sub-area that it called "Central Milton Keynes". This was far bigger than either the district or the parish. Since the 2011 Census, this nomenclature is no longer used.

== Media ==
Locations around Central Milton Keynes were used for the movie Superman IV: The Quest for Peace, where it played the part of the United Nations building. Recognisable locations include Milton Keynes Central, CBX and the Argos (now Home Retail Group) building on Avebury Boulevard.
