= Walter Bor =

Austrian-born British town planner and architect

Walter George Bor CBE
- Born: Walter Bukbinder; 14 October 1916; Vienna
- Died: 4 October 1999 (aged 82)
- Occupations: Town planner and architect
- Employer(s): Llewelyn-Davies, Weeks, Forestier-Walker & Bor
- Known for: Plan for Milton Keynes
- Spouse: Dr Muriel Blackburn (third wife)
- Children: son (first marriage) son and daughter (second marriage)

Walter George Bor CBE (14 October 1916 – 4 October 1999) was an Austrian-born British town planner and architect who was influential in the development of new towns in the UK and elsewhere in the second half of the twentieth century.

== Life and career ==
He was born Walter Bukbinder in Vienna, the son of a secular Jewish Czech chemical engineer. He studied architecture at Prague University, before escaping the German occupation of Czechoslovakia in 1938 with his friend, the actor Herbert Lom, and travelling to Britain. Many members of his family subsequently died at the Birkenau concentration camp. He worked in a munitions factory, and served in the Czech army in exile, before continuing his studies in architecture and town planning at Cambridge and at the Bartlett School of Architecture in London.

In 1947 he joined London County Council as a planner, rising to a position in which, by 1958, he was in charge of planning the renewal and redevelopment of parts of the East End. He moved to Liverpool City Council in 1962, as chief planning officer. In 1966 he resigned, partly because he disagreed with the council's support for high-rise housing. He then became a partner in the private architectural and planning consultancy of Llewelyn-Davies, Weeks, Forestier-Walker & Bor, and began working on the development of Washington new town, in County Durham, and on a large new urban development, Ciudad Losada, 50 km. south of Caracas in Venezuela.

He was then involved in developing the overall plan for Milton Keynes, which won the government's competition to plan the new town. Bor later said:

They wanted a 21st century new town, not the end of the 20th century. So we had to think ahead to what kind of changes there will be, particularly in industry and the increasing role of knowledge, computerisation and so on. This was way ahead of contemporary thinking at the time and it was one of the things which we were very keen on..... Anyway, we were trying to develop a strategic framework for development which would be sufficiently firm for the infrastructure to be constructed, because you have got to tell the engineers where their roads and sewers will be, etc. So for that you need a clear and firm physical structure. Beyond that we were hoping to have, as it were, a menu of the different approaches, different solutions, within this framework. In other words, we were planning for pluralist solutions rather than singles and we were very keen that it wasn't just a physical plan, that it was a plan which understood the social implications...Cities must absorb change, live with it, rather than prohibit it. So, I think there is still great scope to improve the city, and I think it will happen.

Bor also worked on development proposals in the US, Canada and Scotland, and wrote the book The Making of Cities (1970). He was elected President of the Royal Town Planning Institute in 1970, and was appointed a CBE in 1975. He taught at London, Princeton and Rice Universities. During the 1970s and 1980s, as well as continuing to work on the development of Milton Keynes, and in Venezuela, he worked on the development plans for Bogotá, Colombia, and Nicosia, Cyprus. He was appointed as consultant to the Shenzhen Urban Planning Commission in Guangdong, China, and also returned as a consultant to work on the planning of Prague.

National Life Stories conducted an oral history interview (C467/13) with Walter Bor in 1997 for its Architects Lives' collection held by the British Library.

He was married three times, and died in 1999 at the age of 82.
