= List of schools in Bedford =

This is a list of schools in the Borough of Bedford, in the English county of Bedfordshire.

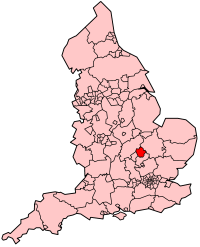

== State-funded schools ==
=== Primary and lower schools ===
- Balliol Primary School, Kempston
- Bedford Road Primary School, Kempston
- Brickhill Primary School, Brickhill, Bedford
- Broadmead Lower School, Stewartby
- Bromham CE Primary School, Bromham
- Camestone School, Kempston
- Carlton CE Primary School, Carlton
- Castle Newnham School, Castle, Bedford
- Cauldwell School, Cauldwell, Bedford
- Christopher Reeves CE Primary School, Podington
- Cotton End Forest School, Cotton End
- Edith Cavell Primary School, Harpur, Bedford
- Eileen Wade Primary School, Upper Dean
- Elstow School, Elstow
- Goldington Green Academy, Goldington, Bedford
- Great Barford CE Primary Academy, Great Barford
- Great Denham Primary School, Great Denham
- Great Ouse Primary Academy, Biddenham
- Harrold Primary Academy, Harrold
- Hazeldene School, Putnoe, Bedford
- The Hills Academy, Putnoe, Bedford
- Kempston Rural Primary School, Kempston Rural
- King's Oak Primary School, Kingsbrook, Bedford
- Kymbrook Primary School, Keysoe Row
- Lakeview School, Wixams
- Livingstone Primary School, Harpur, Bedford
- Milton Ernest CE Primary School, Milton Ernest
- Oakley Primary Academy, Oakley
- Pinchmill Primary School, Felmersham
- Priory Primary School, Castle, Bedford
- Putnoe Primary School, Putnoe, Bedford
- Queens Park Academy, Queens Park, Bedford
- Ravensden CE Primary Academy, Ravensden
- Renhold Primary School, Renhold
- Riseley CE Primary School, Riseley
- Roxton CE Academy, Roxton
- St Francis of Assisi RC Primary School, Queens Park, Bedford
- St James CE Primary School, Biddenham
- St John Rigby RC Primary School, De Parys, Bedford
- St Lawrence CE Primary School, Wymington
- Scott Primary School, Brickhill, Bedford
- Shackleton Primary School, Cauldwell, Bedford
- Sharnbrook Primary, Sharnbrook
- Sheerhatch Primary School, Cople & Willington
- Shortstown Primary School, Shortstown
- Springfield Primary School, Kempston
- Thurleigh Primary School, Thurleigh
- Turvey Primary School, Turvey
- Ursula Taylor CE School, Clapham
- Westfield Primary School, Queens Park, Bedford
- Wilden CE Primary School, Wilden
- Wilstead Primary School, Wilstead
- Wixams Tree Primary, Wixams
- Wootton Lower School, Wootton

=== Middle schools ===
- Marston Vale Middle School, Stewartby

=== Secondary and upper schools ===
- Bedford Academy, Kingsbrook, Bedford
- Bedford Free School, Castle, Bedford
- Biddenham International School and Sports College, Biddenham
- Castle Newnham School, De Parys, Bedford
- Daubeney Academy, Kempston
- Goldington Academy, De Parys, Bedford
- Kempston Academy, Kempston
- Lincroft Academy, Oakley
- Mark Rutherford School, Putnoe, Bedford
- St Thomas More Catholic School, Brickhill, Bedford
- Sharnbrook Academy, Sharnbrook
- Wixams Academy, Wixams
- Wootton Upper School, Wootton

=== Special and alternative schools ===
- Grange Academy, Kempston
- Greys Education Centre, Kempston
- Ridgeway School, Kempston
- St John's School and College, Kempston

=== Further education ===
- Bedford College
- The Bedford Sixth Form
- Kimberley College

== Independent schools ==
=== Primary and preparatory schools ===
- Bedford Preparatory School, De Parys, Bedford
- Pilgrims Pre-Preparatory School, Brickhill, Bedford
- Polam School, Harpur, Bedford

=== Senior and all-through schools ===
- Bedford Girls' School, Castle, Bedford
- Bedford Greenacre Independent School, Bedford
- Bedford Modern School, Harpur, Bedford
- Bedford School, De Parys, Bedford

=== Special and alternative schools ===
- Cambian Walnut Tree Lodge School, Wilden
- E-Spired, Cauldwell, Bedford
- KWS Educational Services, Newnham, Bedford

=== Further education ===
- Stella Mann College of Performing Arts
