= List of local nature reserves in Bedfordshire =

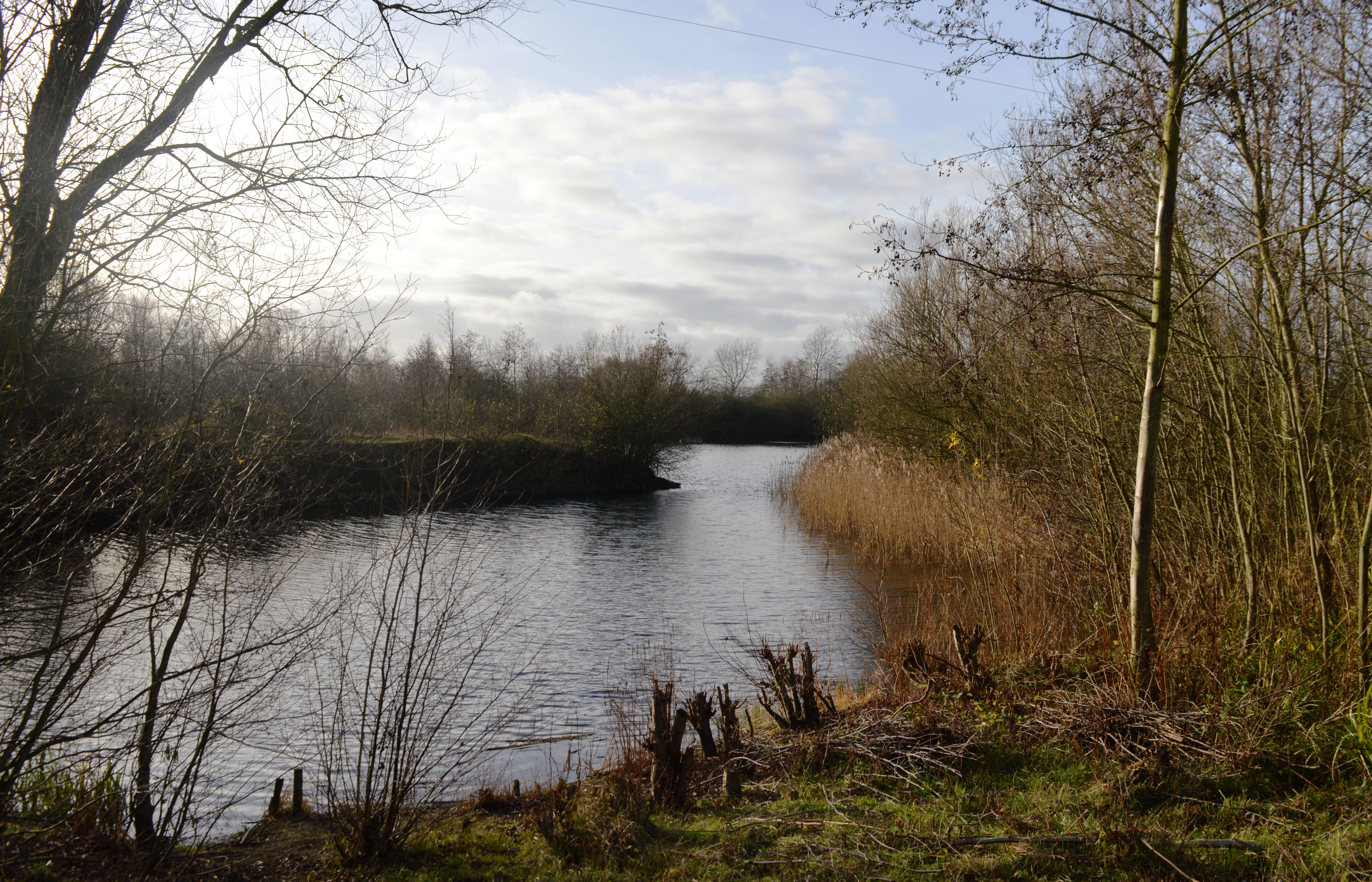
Bromham Lake

Bedfordshire is a county in the East of England. It is bounded by Hertfordshire to the south-east, Cambridgeshire to the north-east, Northamptonshire to the north, and Buckinghamshire to the west. It has an area of 1,235 square kilometres (477 sq mi), and a population estimated in 2016 at 640,000, with an increase of 11% over the previous ten years. Geographically, it is mainly rural, but still the fourteenth most densely populated county of England, with over half the population living in the two largest built-up areas, Luton and Bedford. The county is governed by three unitary authorities, Bedford, Central Bedfordshire and Luton. The county town is Bedford, and the name is first recorded in the treaty in about 879 between King Alfred the Great and Guthrum, which divided English and Danish territory by a line which went through Bedford.

Much of Luton and southern Bedfordshire lies in the Chilterns Area of Outstanding Natural Beauty. North and mid Bedfordshire are undulating claylands with broad river valleys of the River Great Ouse and its tributaries, and the Bedfordshire Greensand Ridge. Jurassic and Cretaceous clays are overlaid by Quaternary glacial deposits of chalky boulder clay.

Local nature reserves (LNRs) are designated by local authorities under the National Parks and Access to the Countryside Act 1949. The local authority must have a legal control over the site, by owning or leasing it, or having a legal agreement with the owner. LNRs are sites which have a special local interest either biologically or geologically, and local authorities have a duty to care for them. They can apply local bye-laws to manage and protect LNRs.

As of March 2016 there are twenty local nature reserves in Bedfordshire: eight in Bedford, eleven in Central Bedfordshire and one in Luton. The largest is Harrold-Odell Country Park with 59.3 hectares (147 acres); it is a former quarry on the bank of the River Great Ouse which has river meadows and two lakes. The smallest is Hill Rise at 0.9 hectares (2.2 acres); it is close to Bedford town centre and surrounded on three sides by houses, but it has a variety of habitats. There is public access to all the sites.

== Key ==
=== Other classifications ===
- CAONB = Chilterns Area of Outstanding Natural Beauty
- SM = Scheduled monument
- SSSI = Site of Special Scientific Interest
- WTBCN = Wildlife Trust for Bedfordshire, Cambridgeshire and Northamptonshire

== Sites ==
Site	Photograph	Area (Note: The area is taken from the Natural England map of each site. (Click on the identify icon (i) in the "Feature Tools" and then click on the site.))	Location (Note: The location is taken from the Natural England details page for the site.)	Borough	Map (Note: The maps are on the Natural England database of local nature reserves.)	Details (Note: Details are on the pages on each site in the Natural England database of local nature reserves.)	Other classifications	Description
Bromham Lake	Bromham Lake	10.9 hectares (27 acres)	Bromham; 52.1519°N 0.5005°W; TL 025 515	Bedford	Map	Details		The lake was created during mineral working, and birds include the great crested grebe. Other habitats include a wildflower meadow, grassland, woodland and a limestone cliff.
Browns Wood	Browns Wood	6.0 hectares (15 acres)	Clapham; 52.1807°N 0.5032°W; TL 025 545	Bedford	Map	Details		The wood was planted by the Duke of Bedford in the middle of the eighteenth century. It is ancient semi-natural woodland of beech, larch and poplar. Ground flora include wood anemone and nettle leaved bellflower, and there are birds such as great spotted woodpeckers and song thrushes.
Cooper's Hill	Cooper's Hill	12.7 hectares (31 acres)	Ampthill; 52.0273°N 0.5016°W; TL 029 376	Central	Map	Details	SSSI, WTBCN	In the view of Natural England, this site has the best remaining area in the county of heathland on the thin acidic soils of the Lower Greensand Ridge. It also has varied invertebrates and two areas of marshy woodland.
Cottage Bottom Fields	Cottage Bottom Fields	14.1 hectares (35 acres)	Dunstable; 51.8743°N 0.4907°W; TL 040 206	Central	Map	Details		The site is chalk grassland on a steep slope, and the wide variety of flowers include what may be the largest population of pignut in the country. Birds include Northern wheatears, European stonechat, whinchat and ring ouzels.
Fenlake Meadows	Fenlake Meadows	19.2 hectares (47 acres)	Bedford; 52.1272°N 0.4442°W; TL 066 488	Bedford	Map	Details		This site is on the bank of the River Great Ouse, and it is often wet and waterlogged. The meadows are grazed by cattle, and there are wetland plants of ecological interest.
Flitton Moor	Flitton Moor	6.9 hectares (17 acres)	Flitton; 52.0124°N 0.4628°W; TL 056 360	Central	Map	Details		The site was open moorland in the Middle Ages, but it was converted to agricultural land in the nineteenth century. The central area is pasture with a strip of woodland around the edge. Other habitats are fen and wetland. Trees include osiers.
Flitwick Wood	Flitwick Wood	14.2 hectares (35 acres)	Flitwick; 52.00222°N 0.5112°W; TL 023 348	Central	Map	Details		This is semi-natural woodland, with some ancient trees and others which have recently been planted. It has a varied flora, including wood anemones, wood spurges and primroses, and diverse birds, bats and insects.
Galley and Warden Hills SSSI	Galley and Warden Hills	44.6 hectares (110 acres)	Luton; 51.9269°N 0.4147°W; TL 092 265	Luton	Map	Details	SSSI	The site is chalk grassland with areas of dense scrub, and it has many plants which are rare nationally and locally. It has a wide variety of wild flowers and more than twenty species of butterflies.
Harrold-Odell Country Park	Island in Harrold Odell Country Park	59.3 hectares (147 acres)	Harrold; 52.2038°N 0.5981°W; SP 959 571	Bedford	Map	Details		This former quarry is bordered on its southern and eastern side by the River Great Ouse. It has two lakes, water meadows and woodland, some of which is seasonally flooded.
Henlow Common and Langford Meadows	Langford Meadows	18.4 hectares (45 acres)	Langford; 52.0503°N 0.2748°W; TL 184 405	Central	Map	Details		This site on the bank of the River Ivel is mainly grassland with areas of scrub and bushes. There are also some native trees and a stream, which make it an important area for wildlife. Plants include marsh marigolds and there are birds such as kingfishers. The river bank has otters and water voles.
Hill Rise	Hill Rise	0.9 hectares (2.2 acres)	Bedford; 52.1478°N 0.4710°W; TL 047 511	Bedford	Map	Details		The small site is surrounded on three sides by houses, but it has a variety of habitats, woodland, meadow, scrub and two ponds. Wildlife includes muntjac deer, foxes, birds, dragonflies and butterflies.
Kings Wood and Glebe Meadows, Houghton Conquest	Long Meadow and Kings Wood	36.1 hectares (89 acres)	Houghton Conquest; 52.0512°N 0.4775°W; TL 045 403	Central	Map	Details	SSSI	This site has ash and maple woodland on heavy clay, a habitat which has become rare in lowland England. It is biologically diverse, with a number of rare species. Several plants are indicative of ancient woodland, such as wood melick and wood anemone.
Marston Thrift	Marston Thrift	55.8 hectares (138 acres)	Cranfield; 52.0651°N 0.5820°W; SP 973 417	Central	Map	Details	SSSI	Like Kings Wood and Glebe Meadows, this site has ash and maple woodland on heavy clay. It also has areas of damp grassland, and a grassland valley. It is an important site for butterflies, including the rare black hairstreak.
Maulden Church Meadow	Maulden Church Meadow	3.3 hectares (8.2 acres)	Maulden; 52.0321°N 0.4577°W; TL 059 382	Central	Map	Details	SSSI	This is unimproved pasture on the Lower Greensand Ridge. It has many grass and herb species, and there are small areas of acidic grassland. An open pond has aquatic plants, while two ponds which have been filled in have a varied marsh vegetation.
Mowsbury Hill	Mowsbury Hill	2.8 hectares (6.9 acres)	Bedford; 52.1668°N 0.4428°W; TL 066 532	Bedford	Map	Details	SM	The site is an old orchard with a wildflower meadow, woodland, scrub, a moat and ponds. It is also the site of an early Iron Age hillfort and a medieval moated settlement with two fishponds.
Park Wood, Bedford	Park Wood	5.2 hectares (13 acres)	Bedford; 52.1563°N 0.4724°W; TL 046 520	Bedford	Map	Details		The site has diverse habitats with mature trees, grassland, scrub and ponds. Flowers include bee and pyramidal orchids. An orchard has been planted with traditional fruit trees.
Putnoe Wood	Putnoe Wood	10.4 hectares (26 acres)	Bedford; 52.1623°N 0.4415°W; TL 067 527	Bedford	Map	Details		This is ancient woodland with hazel coppice in the northern half, and the ground flora has areas of bluebells. Bird species include wood pigeons, blue tits and great tits.
The Riddy	The Riddy and River Ivel	8.4 hectares (21 acres)	Sandy; 52.1243°N 0.2968°W; TL 167 487	Central	Map	Details	WTBCN	This water meadow is one of the few surviving areas of flood plain of the River Ivel. Aquatic plants include celery leaved buttercup and water plantain, and there are birds such as lapwings, fieldfares and redwings. Water voles are found along the river.
Stotfold Mill Meadows	Stotfold Mill Meadows	3.4 hectares (8.4 acres)	Stotfold; 52.0143°N 0.2179°W; TL 224 366	Central	Map	Details		The meadows are on the east bank of the River Ivel, and have water birds and invertebrates such as frogs, toads and newts. The site also has meadows with a number of ponds, and an area of woodland.
Totternhoe Knolls	Totternhoe Knolls	13.3 hectares (33 acres)	Totternhoe; 51.8880°N 0.5789°W; SP 979 220	Central	Map	Details	CAONB, SM, SSSI, WTBCN	Part of this site was formerly a chalk quarry. It is now grassland with a rich variety of plant species, including some that are now rare. There are a number of orchids and a wide variety of invertebrates, including butterflies such as the scarce small blue and Duke of Burgundy.

== See also ==
- List of Sites of Special Scientific Interest in Bedfordshire
- List of local nature reserves in England
