= Dame Alice Harpur School =

Coordinates: 52.13302°N 0.46078°W

Location
- Cardington Road; Bedford, Bedfordshire, MK42 0BX; England

Information
- Type: Selective Girls' private school
- Motto: 'Ardent au devoir quotidien' Discover your talents. Be the best you can be.
- Established: 1882
- Founder: Harpur Trust
- Closed: 2012
- Gender: Girls
- Age: 7 to 18
- Enrolment: 1000
- Houses: Harpur, Howard, Bunyan, Russell
- Colours: Damson and blue
- Publication: Reflections

Dame Alice Harpur School (also known as DAHS), known from 1882 until 1946 as Bedford Girls' Modern School, was a private girls school in Bedford, England, for girls aged 7–18. In September 2010 the junior department of the school merged with the junior department of Bedford High School. From September 2011 to September 2012 the senior schools also merged; the new school is known as Bedford Girls' School.

== Bedford Girls' Modern School, 1882 to 1946 ==
The school was established in 1882 as the Bedford Girls' Modern School, at the same time and on the same site as the Bedford High School for girls, both of which were part of the Harpur Trust group of independent schools which also included the boys' schools Bedford School and Bedford Modern School. At first, it shared its premises with Bedford High School, until in 1892 it moved to St Paul's Square, occupying the William Cowper building left vacant by the Grammar School, with Mary Eliza Porter as headmistress until her resignation in 1894. Initially, the Girls' Modern School was much less successful in attracting girls than the more traditional High School, and in 1894 the number of pupils at the two was 146 and 553 respectively. However, under a new head mistress, Edith Dolby (1894 to 1925), the school began to find its way. The curriculum was expanded, the girls stayed longer, and by 1908 numbers had reached 312.

In 1938, having outgrown its St Paul's Square site, the school moved to new buildings designed by Oswald Milne on the southern bank of the Great Ouse on Cardington Road, Bedford, built on playing fields there already owned by the Harpur Trust and used by the school.

== Dame Alice Harpur School, 1946 to 2011 ==
In 1946, the school changed its name to Dame Alice Harpur School, adopting the name of the wife of Sir William Harpur, who had originally endowed his foundation with land in Bedford and Holborn, London.

The school had a Christian ethos, but was fundamentally ecumenical.

After the move of 1938, the senior school had modern buildings, plus gardens and playing fields, on a riverside site. It had a floodlit all-weather pitch, tennis courts, netball courts, hockey fields, indoor swimming pool, sports hall, gymnasium, sports pavilion, and a boathouse on the River Great Ouse. There were facilities for design technology, textiles, art, and drama; two Georgian houses were adapted to provide a sixth-form centre, Chequers cafe and music centre.

The school had a 100% GCSE pass rate in 2003. Drama was strong and the music department had choirs, orchestras, string quartets, a string orchestra, wind band, and other ensembles. Sports teams competed at county and regional level, and some at national level. Extra-curricular activities included the Duke of Edinburgh Award Scheme, Combined Cadet Force, debating, Youth Theatre, chess, field courses and a wide range of outdoor activities and visits.

Jill Berry, head of Dame Alice Harpur School from 2000 to 2010, was the President of the Girls' Schools Association in 2009.

== Merger ==
In July 2009, the Harpur Trust announced its intention to merge Dame Alice Harpur School with Bedford High School. The decision was made as both schools had seen a drop in pupil numbers over the years: In 1990 more than 2,000 girls were on the rolls of both schools, whilst in 2009 there were only 1,500. In November 2009, it was announced that the new merged school would be called Bedford Girls' School, and would be located on the campus of Dame Alice Harpur School at Cardington Road. The junior department of the new school opened in September 2010, when the junior schools of Bedford High and Dame Alice Harpur merged on the Cardington Road site. The senior department of Dame Alice Harpur School started to transfer to the new school administration in September 2011, with the full merger, including the sixth form department completed in September 2012.

== Head Mistresses ==
=== Bedford Girls’ Modern School ===
- 1882–1894: Mary Eliza Porter (died 1905)
- 1894–1925: Edith Emily Dolby, BA (Cantab.) (1863–1947)
- 1925–1939: Beatrice Alice Tonkin MA (Cantab.) (1884–1953)

=== Dame Alice Harpur School ===
- 1946–1955: Irene Forster BSc
- 1955–1970: Hilda Lawson-Brown
- 1970–1990: Suzanne Morse
- 1990–2000: Rosanne Randle BA MA (Ed)
- 2000–2010: Jill Berry BA MEd
- 2010–2020: Jo Mackenzie

== Notable former pupils ==
- Sue Beardsmore, BBC television presenter
- Louise Brealey, actress and journalist
- Gail Emms, Olympic badminton silver medalist
- Lucie Green, astrophysicist
- Claudia Hammond, author and BBC radio presenter
- Kirsty Hayes, British Ambassador to Portugal
- Jean Muir CBE FCSD, fashion designer
- Kim Pearce, Theatre Director
- Anna Ploszajski, Young Engineer of the Year by the Royal Academy of Engineering

== Bursars ==
- 1991–2005: Stewart Frater
- 2005–2011: Jean-Marc Hodgkin, BSc, FCA, FSI, ACIS, DChA

== See also ==
- List of independent schools in the United Kingdom
