= Harpur =

Area of Bedford, England

Coordinates: 52.14695°N 0.4767°W

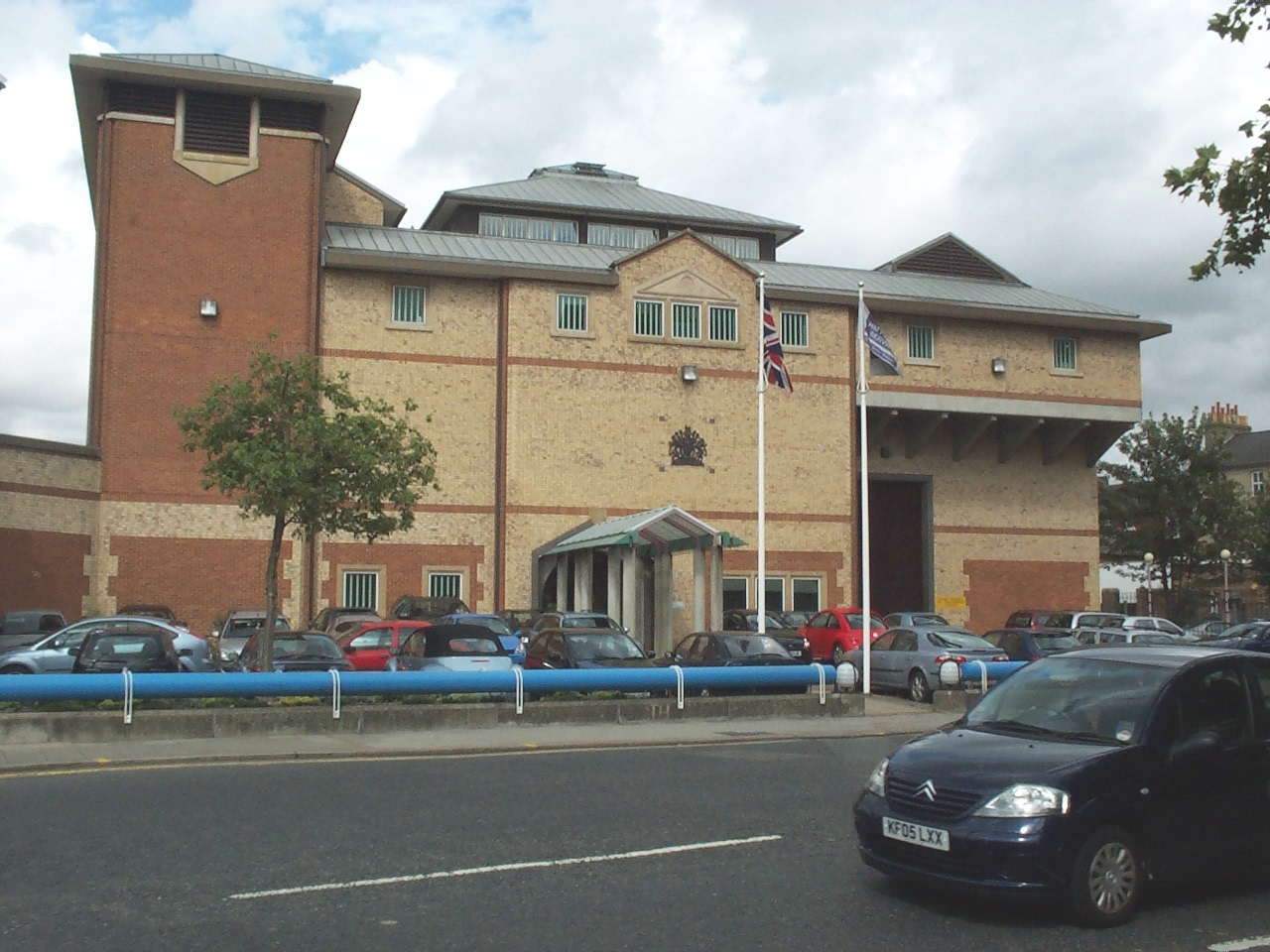
- Bedford Prison, located in Harpur

- Location within Bedfordshire
- Population: 8,501; 8,242 {Census 2011. Ward}
- OS grid reference: TL043509
- Unitary authority: Bedford
- Ceremonial county: Bedfordshire
- Region: East
- Country: England
- Sovereign state: United Kingdom
- Post town: BEDFORD
- Postcode district: MK40, MK41
- Dialling code: 01234
- Police: Bedfordshire
- Fire: Bedfordshire and Luton
- Ambulance: East of England
- UK Parliament: Bedford

Harpur is a district of Bedford town centre, and an electoral ward in Bedfordshire, England.

The boundaries of Harpur are approximately Manton Lane to the north, De Parys Avenue to the east, Bromham Road to the south, with the Midland Main Line railway line to the west.

Manton Heights, the Poets, the Prime Ministers, and the Black Tom neighbourhoods all lie within the boundaries of Harpur ward.

== History ==
The area is named after Sir William Harpur a famous Bedfordian. The area houses Bedford Modern School which is part of the Harpur Trust.

A notorious Highwayman labelled 'Black Tom' reportedly frequented the area in the late eighteenth and early nineteenth centuries. Supposedly he was buried with a stake driven through his heart at the junction of Tavistock Street, Union Street and Clapham Road. Today Black Tom is the informal name of the area in Harpur located north of Tavistock Street.

Most buildings in the area date from the 19th Century or before. However the northern part of the area (Manton Heights) was developed much later, in the 1970s.

The Bedford Physical Training College (later, Bedford College of Physical Education) was founded on Landsdowne Road in 1903. The campus joined two others in 1976 to form Bedford College of Higher Education which in turn joined other colleges to form De Montfort University in 1994. By this time many of the buildings on or around Lansdowne Road in Harpur were part of the university campus. In 2006 the Bedford arm of De Montfort University and the University of Luton formed the University of Bedfordshire. It was decided that the new university would merge its two Bedford campuses onto one site on Polhill Avenue, De Parys. This meant the end of the Lansdowne Road campus, which lasted in the Harpur area for over 100 years. In July 2009, plans to develop the old university site into housing were rejected by Bedford Borough Council, the local planning authority. However the site has now been redeveloped into housing.

John Le Mesurier who starred as Sergeant Arthur Wilson on the popular 1970s BBC comedy Dad's Army was born in Chaucer Road in the area in 1912. Archbishop Trevor Huddleston was also born in Chaucer Road, in 1913.

== Governance ==
Harpur is an unparished area, with all community services under the direct control of Bedford Borough Council. Harpur elects two councillors to Bedford Borough Council, both of whom are currently from the Labour Party.

== Economy ==
Harpur contains Tavistock Street, one of Bedford's major commercial zones. There are various shops, pubs, offices and restaurants on Tavistock Street. There are more shops and businesses dotted around Harpur, including Bromham Road which houses Bedford Prison. There has been a prison on this site since 1801.

To the north of Harpur is the Manton Heights Industrial Estate (located on Manton Lane) which houses many different businesses including offices of WesternGeco, and the Institution of Diesel and Gas Turbine Engineers.

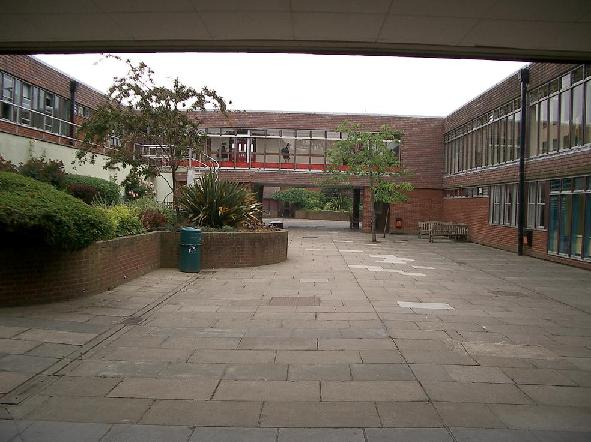
Bedford Modern School in Harpur

== Education ==
There are two state primary schools in Harpur – Edith Cavell Primary School located on Manton Lane, and Livingstone Primary School situated on Clapham Road. There are no secondary schools in Harpur. Children in the area are in the catchment for Biddenham International School in Biddenham.

There are three independent schools in Harpur – Polam School is located on Lansdowne Road, and Bedford Greenacre Independent School has a campus situated on Shakespeare Road. For older children, Bedford Modern School is located on Manton Lane. Stella Mann College is a private performing arts college, located on Linden Road. The college attracts students from all over the United Kingdom and abroad, as well as locally.

Bedford High School closed over the summer of 2012. Most of the school site has been leased by Bedford College, who use it as a campus for The Bedford Sixth Form (Bedford Colleges branding of its sixth form provision), as well as most of its other class-room based activities and higher education courses.

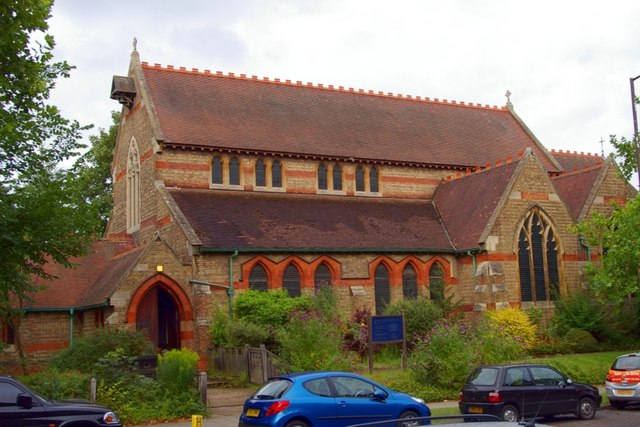
St Martin's Church in Harpur

== Religious sites ==
- St Martin's Church (Church of England), located on Clapham Road
- Primitive Methodist Church, located on Park Road
- The main Quaker Meeting House for Bedford is on Lansdowne Road
- Divine Intervention Ministries, at the Tavistock Community Centre
- Kingdom Way Church, also at the Tavistock Community Centre
- The Glorious Freedom Revival Church, also at the Tavistock Community Centre
- Urban Mission Church, also at the Tavistock Community Centre

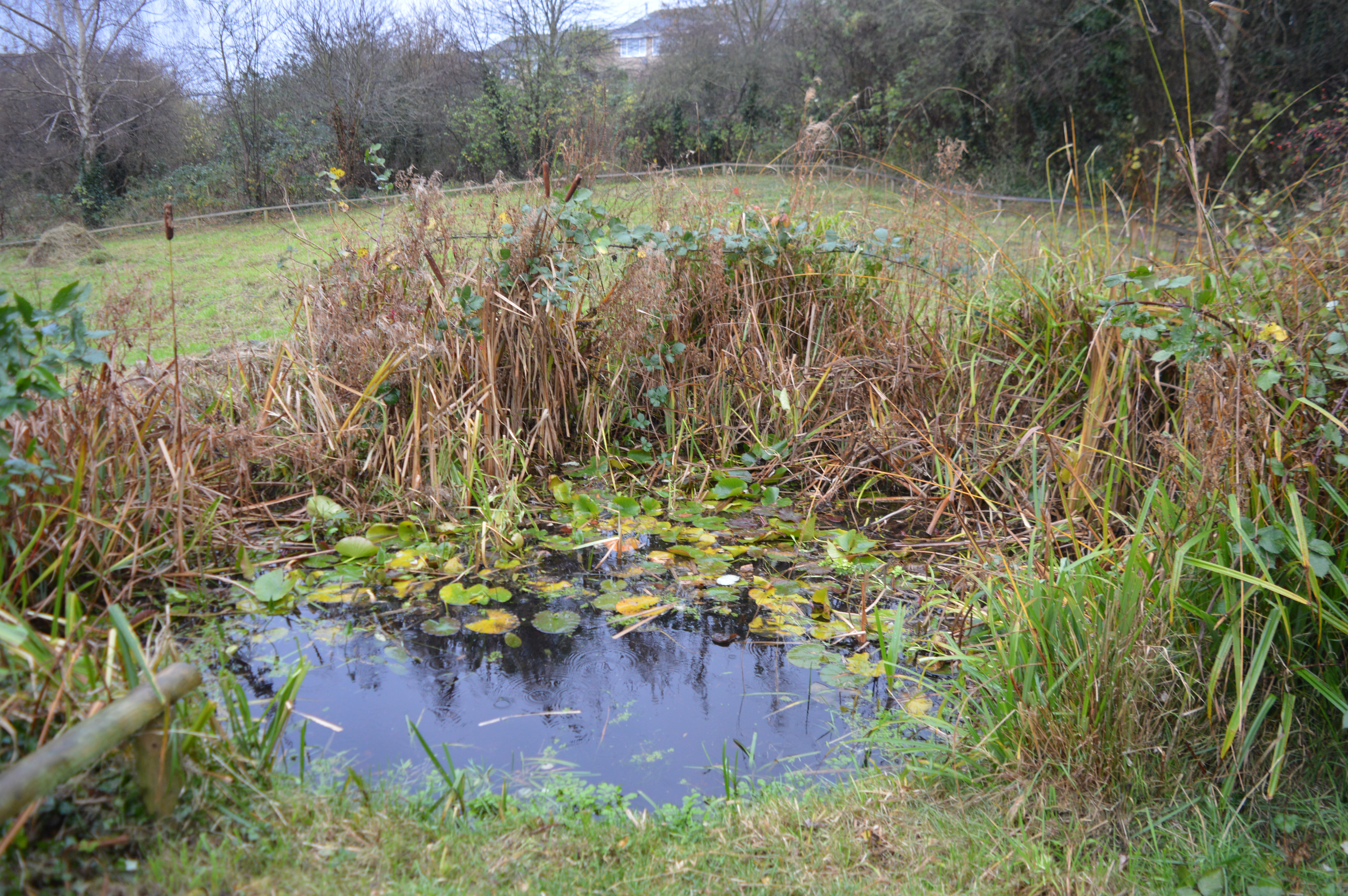
Hill Rise nature reserve

== Community facilities ==
Harpur's community centre is located just off Tavistock Street, on Princes Street. Facilities at the Trinity Arts & Leisure complex of The Bedford Sixth Form are available for hire and use by the local community.

Harpur is the only area in Bedford not to have any large public open space or recreation ground within its boundaries, but there is the Hill Rise local nature reserve located off Park Road North and Ramsay Close, and a play area on Clapham Road, close to the supermarket. A small park known locally as Plantation Park was created between Linden Road and Dynevor Road as part of the redevelopment of the former De Montfort University site during the 2010s, including green space, play equipment and tennis courts. The ward is bounded by open land between the urban area of Bedford and Clapham, and Bedford Park is situated just outside the area, on the corner of Foster Hill Road and Park Avenue.
