= Jean Muir =

British fashion designer

Jean Muir CBE FCSD
- Born: Jean Elizabeth Muir; 17 July 1928; London, England
- Died: 28 May 1995 (aged 66); London, England
- Education: Bedford Girls' Modern School
- Label: Jean Muir Ltd

Jean Elizabeth Muir CBE FCSD (/mjʊər/ MURE; 17 July 1928 – 28 May 1995) was a British fashion designer.

== Early life and career ==
Jean Muir was born in London, the daughter of Cyril Muir, a draper's floor superintendent, and his wife, Phyllis Coy. Her father was an Aberdonian, and Muir would attribute her creative pragmatism and self-discipline to this Scottish ancestry. Her parents separated while she was still a child, and she and her brother Christopher were brought up in Bedford by their mother. She was educated at the Bedford Girls' Modern School (subsequently renamed Dame Alice Harpur School, and as of 2010, merged into the Bedford Girls' School). She showed a precocious talent for needlework, claiming to have been able to knit, embroider, and sew by the age of six.

At the age of seventeen, she left school and went to work at an electoral registration office at Bedford Town Hall. She then moved to London, where she worked briefly in a solicitor's office before taking a stockroom job at Liberty & Co in 1950. She worked her way upwards to selling over the counter, and then despite her lack of formal art college training, was given the opportunity to sketch in Liberty's ready to wear department. This would serve as her apprenticeship, and led to her gaining a job as designer for Jaeger in 1956. While there, she helped develop the Young Jaeger fashion label.

== Jane & Jane (1962–1966) ==
Upon leaving Jaeger, Muir was approached by David Barnes, a mass-market jersey dress manufacturer, who was keen to have her talents on board as a designer for his brand. Muir declined, as she did not wish to design for the mass market. Undeterred, Barnes offered to fund her own design label, and so Jane & Jane launched in 1962.

In 1964, Jean Muir won the first of her three Dress Of The Year awards for a Jane & Jane dress in printed Liberty silk, which is preserved as part of the Dress Of The Year collection at the Fashion Museum, Bath. From the outset, Muir's designs demonstrated the pared-down understatement and easy fit that would become her design signature. Jane & Jane was one of the first companies to bring couture standards and quality to the wholesale fashion industry. Muir used Liberty textiles in many of her designs.

After Muir left in 1966 to launch Jean Muir Ltd., the Jane & Jane brand was sold to the ready-to-wear fashion house Susan Small, where it continued for several years before quietly disappearing circa 1970.

== Jean Muir Ltd. (1966–2007) ==
Jean Muir Ltd. was founded in August 1966 by Jean Muir and her husband Harry Leuckert in partnership. The first collection was presented in October.

The designs continued the tradition established at Jane & Jane. Muir used the best quality fabrics, working in silk, cashmere, jersey and crepe, with a focus on form and fluidity. She made coats and jackets from soft leather and supple suede. Muir rarely used printed textiles, and avoided unnecessary decoration. Where she used decoration, it was integral to the garment, such as pintucking, decorative but functional buttons or rows of parallel topstitching on cuffs or collars for reinforcement. During the 1980s, Muir sometimes decorated clothing with sequins.

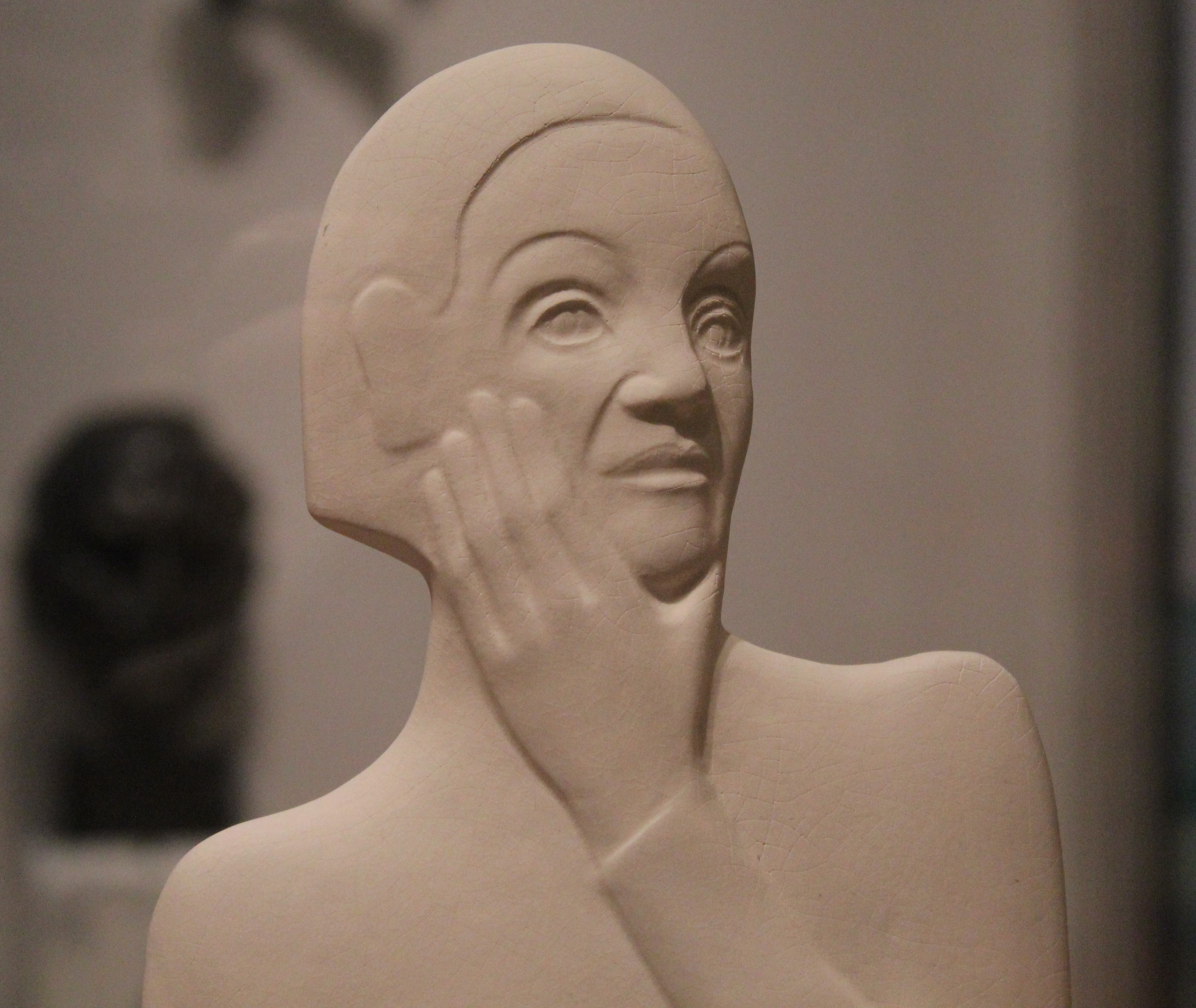
Jean Muir by Glenys Barton, 1992

Muir's designs were aimed towards the woman with a mature outlook, regardless of age. She avoided creating clothes for fantasy figures, but focused on modern, restrained elegance. She ignored the fads of high fashion design, but focused on creating a consistently evolving series of understated, sober clothes. She was a sensualist who cared about how her clothes felt to wear as well as how they looked to others. Muir placed pockets at hip level to encourage the wearer to hold her shoulders back confidently. She eliminated bust darts as she preferred to mould fabric rather than cut it. Her designs were intended to fit into a limited and integrated wardrobe, and to avoid distracting the wearer.

Despite being often associated almost exclusively with black dresses, she also used a range of colors, favoring dark and deep blues, very dark greens, and heather-toned purples, as well as intensely bright orange and deep saffron yellow. She worked closely with fabric mills and dyers to achieve specific tones.

Muir has been described as bringing common sense to clothing design to the pitch of genius. Jane Mulvagh describes Muir clothes as being comfortable and effortless, and, "once donned, easily forgotten by the wearer but never the beholder."

Following her 1964 win whilst at Jane & Jane, Muir went on to win the Dress Of The Year award two more times: In 1968 for a ruffled white voile dress with black polka dots; and in 1979 for an ensemble comprising a black rayon jersey beret and dress worn with a black leather jacket. As with her 1964 design, these outfits are preserved at the Fashion Museum, Bath.

Muir was made a Fellow of the Chartered Society of Designers, and was a recipient of the Minerva Medal, the Society's highest award. In 1984, she was awarded a CBE. Muir also received an Honorary Doctorate from Heriot-Watt University in 1992

The company continued despite Jean Muir's death in 1995. Leuckert continued his directorship, while the designs were produced under the supervision of Joyce Fenton-Douglas and a group of four designers who had all formerly worked with Muir. On 19 January 2007, the directors announced that Jean Muir Ltd. would be closing down. Leuckert made a statement to the effect that he had hoped that they could take the retail route based on the success of the Conduit Street shop. This required substantial outside investment, but they had not been able to come to any agreement with interested parties. He further said:

"It is sad, but I believe this is the way Jean would have wanted it. I have, of course, had offers, but I do not want Jean's name to fall into the wrong hands and be mis-used. That would be horrendous and she would have hated it."

=== Celebrity clients and admirers ===
Actress Joanna Lumley was Muir's first house model, and became a muse, close friend and loyal customer. She was often photographed modelling Muir's designs in the fashion press. Other well-known Muir clients included Lauren Bacall, Maggie Smith, Judi Dench, Charlotte Rampling, Julie Walters, Joan Plowright, Dr. Miriam Stoppard and Patricia Hodge.

In 1967, Muir provided Eleanor Bron's wardrobe for the 1967 film Bedazzled. She did the wardrobe for only one other film, Betrayal, in 1983. Muir's designs were also worn by public figures such as the author and historian Lady Antonia Fraser and publisher Carmen Callil. Other fans of vintage Muir include Kate Moss and Stella McCartney.

=== Diffusion lines and capsule collections of Jean Muir Ltd. ===
- 1983: Jean Muir in Cotton
- 1983: Jean Muir in Wool
- 1984: Jean Muir for Men (menswear)
- 1984: Jean Muir at Home (homewares)
- 1986-1995: Jean Muir Studio collection developed, this was a lower-priced line.
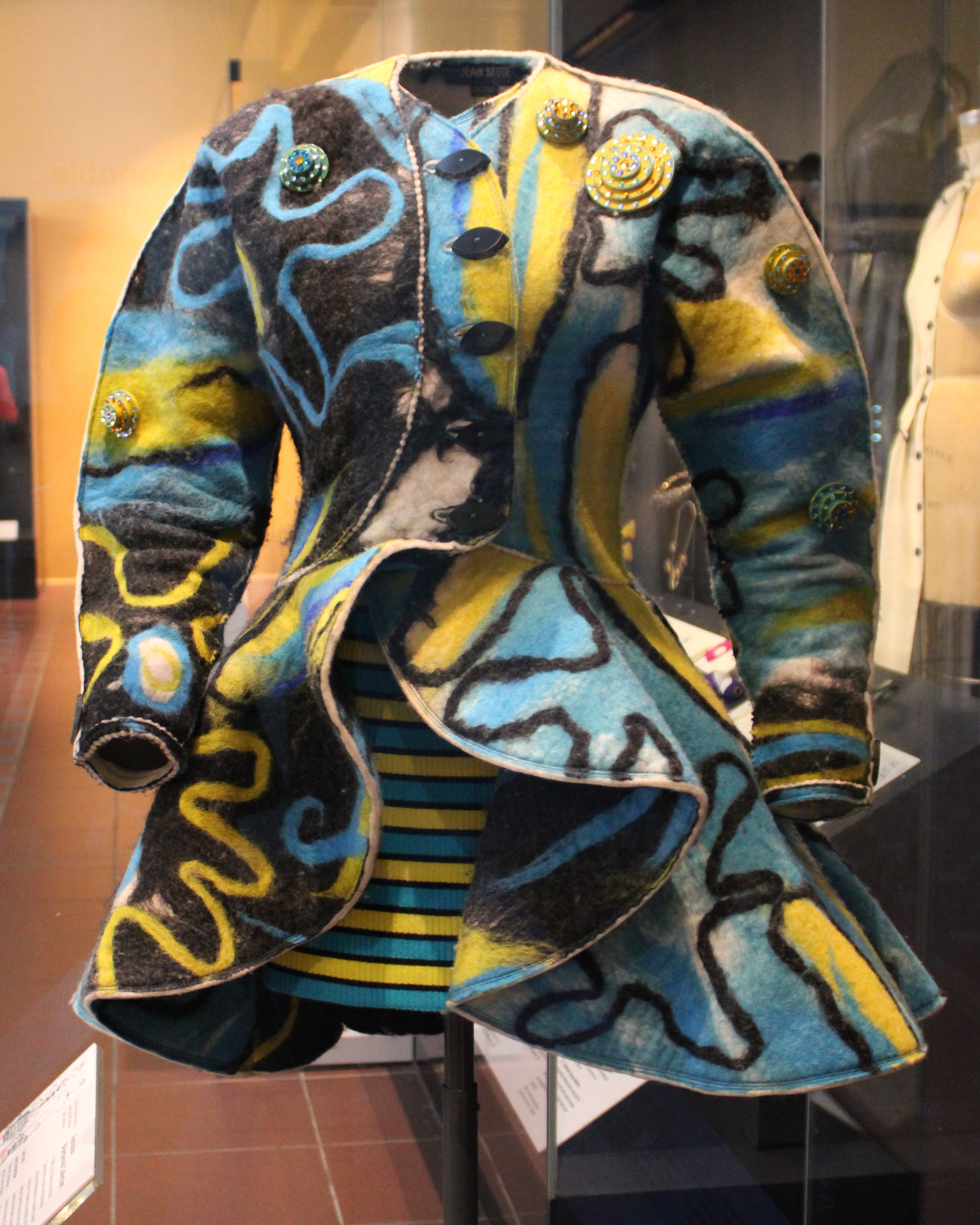
- Woman's coat of felted wool with a black, yellow, turquoise and white abstract pattern, five black plastic shield-shaped buttons and wide skirts, sample garment: British, by Jean Muir Ltd, fabric and buttons by Annie Sherburne, Australian Bicentenial Collection, 1988, National Museum of Scotland
  Early 1990s: Jean Muir Essentials (lower-priced separates)

== Personal life ==
In 1955, Jean Muir married a German actor, Harry Leuckert, with whom she co-founded Jean Muir Ltd. and lived in London and Lorbottle Hall near Alnwick in Northumberland. Their marriage was unconventional, described by Leuckert as "wonderful and loving, but never singular". In 1976, Leuckert fathered a daughter, Friederike, with another woman. His wife was aware of this, and Leuckert continued to live with her whilst paying regular visits to his daughter and her mother, Ingrid, in Germany. According to Friederike, this was normal:

"People find that hard to believe, but Miss Muir knew about it, my mother knew about it and I knew about it. Nothing was hidden, but nor was it public".

Leuckert married Ingrid following the death of his wife. Friederike went on to become manager of the flagship Jean Muir shop in London when it opened in 2004.

== Death and legacy ==
Jean Muir died in 1995, aged 66, at the London Clinic, of breast cancer. She was buried at St Bartholomew's Church in Whittingham, Northumberland. At the funeral, by request of the deceased, her friends all wore black with white flowers.

She had kept her terminal illness secret from even close friends, working right up to the end. Shortly before her death, she began fundraising for the National Museum of Scotland in Edinburgh. Her husband and Jean Muir Ltd. continued the work begun, and pledged money in her memory, as did many of her personal friends and loyal customers. In recognition of her work, the Museum's Silver Room is dedicated to Jean Muir, while Jean Muir Ltd is named upon the founder's stone at the Museum entrance.

In 2005, Leuckert donated Jean Muir's archive collection of her fashion and accessory designs to the National Museums of Scotland. A special exhibition on Muir's design career opened on 7 November 2008 at the Museum.

In April 2021 English Heritage announced that Muir was one of six women who they were honouring with a blue plaque this year, marking the central London showroom and office of her flagship brand, Jean Muir Ltd.
