= Black Tom =

Black Tom may refer to:

- "Black Tom", nickname of Thomas Butler, 10th Earl of Ormond (c.1531–1614), Irish peer and Lord Treasurer of Ireland in the 16th and early 17th centuries.
- "Black Tom", nickname of Thomas Fairfax, 3rd Lord Fairfax of Cameron (1612–1671), English Civil War Parliamentary general
- "Black Tom", an informal name of a neighborhood within the Harpur ward of Bedford, England, named after a notorious highwayman who operated in the area in the late eighteenth and early nineteenth centuries
- Black Tom explosion (30 July 1916), Jersey City, New Jersey; act of World War I sabotage on American ammunition supplies by German agents to prevent shipments to the Allies
- Black Tom Cassidy (created October 1976), a Marvel Comics supervillain, an enemy of the X-Men
- A game of tag; see British Bulldog (game) § Black Tom
