= Anna Ploszajski =

English scientist and writer

Anna Ploszajski (born 1991) is a materials scientist, engineer, and writer. Her book, Handmade: A Scientist's Search for Meaning Through Making, was published by Bloomsbury Publishing in 2021.

== Education and career ==
Ploszajski attended Dame Alice Harpur School (now part of Bedford Girls' School) choosing to study A-Level mathematics, further mathematics, physics and music. She went on to study at Mansfield College, Oxford.

Ploszajski was a post-doc Research Fellow at the Institute of Making, University College London, specialising in the research of 4D printing and metamaterials. In addition, she presents on stage, radio and TV and writes about science. Her debut book, Handmade: A Scientist's Search for Meaning Through Making, was published by Bloomsbury Sigma, the popular science imprint of Bloomsbury Publishing, in 2021.

In 2017, she was named Young Engineer of the Year by the Royal Academy of Engineering, and in 2018 won the Silver Medal from the Institute of Materials, Minerals and Mining.

== Personal life ==
The BBC talk show The Naked Scientists interviewed Ploszajski in 2021 on her experience as a cold water swimmer.
