= William Harpur =

English merchant and philanthropist

Sir William Harpur
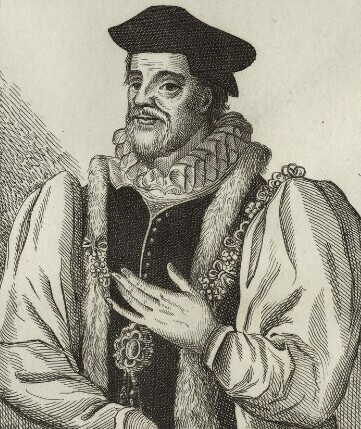

Lord Mayor of London
- In office 1561–1561
- Preceded by: William Chester
- Succeeded by: Thomas Lodge

Personal details
- Born: c. 1496
- Died: 27 February 1574
- Resting place: St Paul's Church, Bedford, England
- Occupation: Merchant
- Known for: Establishing the Harpur Trust

Sir William Harpur (c. 1496 – 27 February 1574) was an English merchant and philanthropist who served as Lord Mayor of London in 1561. Born in Bedford, he moved to London and amassed a large fortune. In 1566, Harpur and his wife Alice gave a financial endowment to support several charities including ones focused on education. The endowment eventually became the Harpur Trust, which supports four independent schools in Bedford today.

== Career ==
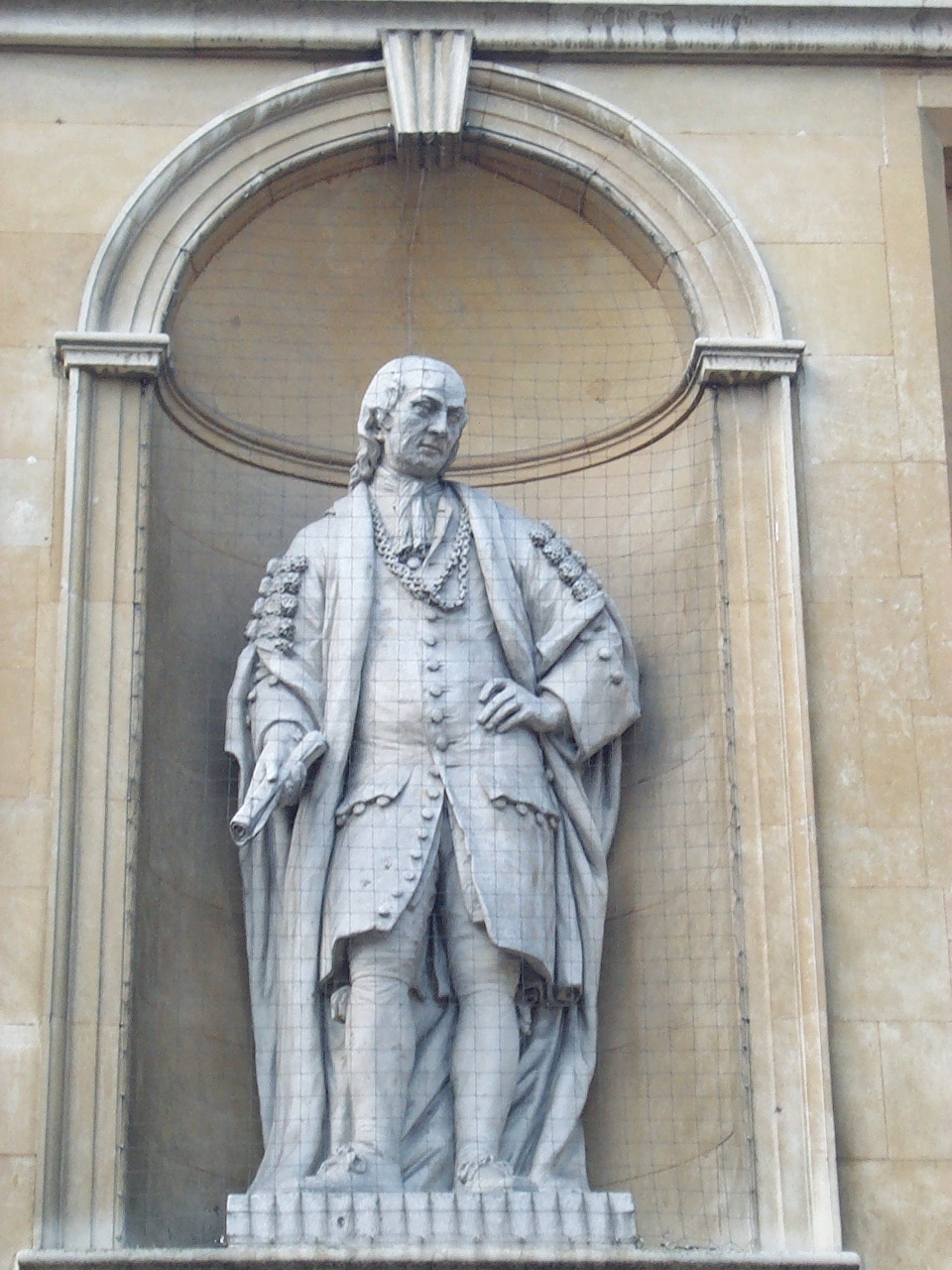
Statue outside the Old Town Hall

The name Harper (or Harpur) is mentioned around 1500 in connection with families from Bedford and Biddenham. Little is known about the life of William. He attended Bedford School whilst it was still administered by the Augustinian Canons of Newnham Priory. It is not certain whether he was a tailor. He was certainly a shrewd businessman. He went to London and was admitted to the guild of Merchant Taylors in 1533. There he would have come into contact with the leading citizens of the day. In 1553 he was elected alderman for the ward of Bridge Without and, three years later, he was elected alderman of the more prestigious ward of Dowgate in preference to three other candidates, one of whom was Thomas Gresham. It had become the custom, after the dissolution of the monasteries, to appoint aldermen as governors to the royal hospitals. Harpur was treasurer of St Bartholomew's Hospital. He served as Sheriff of the City of London from 1556 to 1557, and became Lord Mayor of London in 1561. In 1562 he was knighted by Queen Elizabeth I.

It was at this time that he arranged Bedford's endowment. On 30 September 1562 he bought 13 acres of land and 3 roods of meadow for £180 13s at Holborn, which was just a little way outside the expanding city of London, and this was therefore a good investment. On 22 April 1566 he and Dame Alice conveyed the purchase to the Bedford corporation.

== Later life ==
Harpur continued to lead an active life until he was over 70. He contributed to the purchase of a site for Gresham's new Royal Exchange in 1565. He was regularly in attendance at the meetings of the Merchant Taylors. His wife died on 10 October 1569, and in September 1570 Harpur married Margaret Lethers. He died in 1574, aged 77. He was buried, according to his wishes, in the church of St Paul's Church, Bedford. His widow arranged for the erection of a monumental brass to him, with the inscription: "Hereunder lieth buried the body of Sir William Harpur, knight, alderman and late Lord Mayor of the city of London, with Dame Margaret, his last wife". The plaque is on the south wall of the church, and is supposed to have been moved away from the site of the tomb, making the word "hereunder" slightly incorrect. Dame Margaret herself remarried twice before dying in Bedford on 3 November 1596.

== Legacy ==
The Harpur Trust continues today, supporting education as well as leisure activities for the people of Bedford. The five schools which are governed by the trust are Bedford Academy, Bedford Girls' School, Bedford School, Bedford Modern School and Pilgrims Pre-Preparatory School.

The name Harpur is borne today by the estate office, a street in London, a street in Bedford, the Harpur electoral ward of Bedford, a hospital ward, a group of almshouses, the Harpur Suite (former assembly rooms by the Central Library), and a shopping centre.
