= Claudia Hammond =

British writer and television presenter

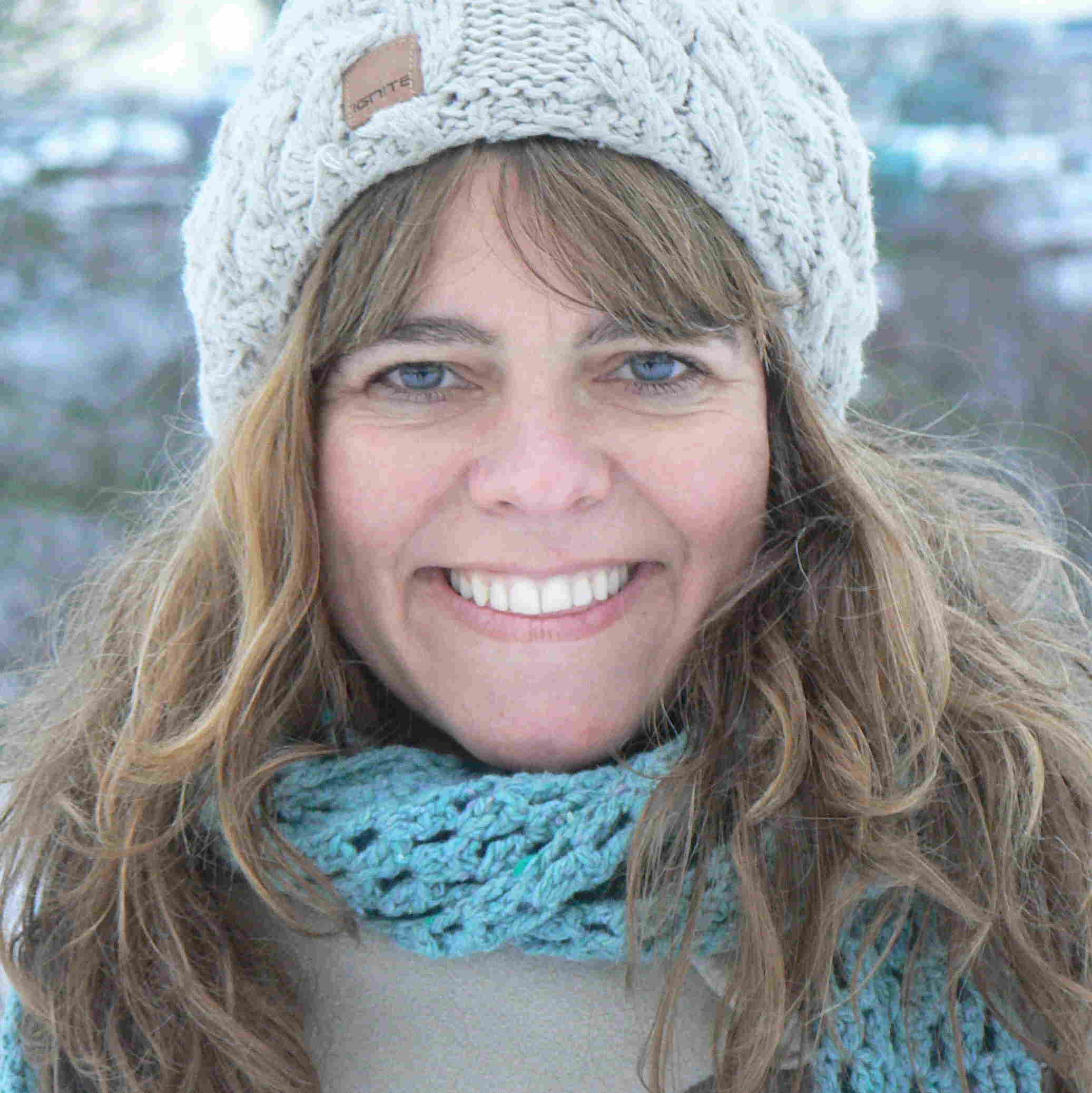
- Hammond in November 2015
- Born: Claudia Anne Hammond; 23 May 1971 (age 55); Sandy, Bedfordshire, England, UK
- Education: Dame Alice Harpur School, Bedford; University of Sussex; University of Surrey (MSc)
- Occupations: Journalist and broadcaster
- Website: https://claudiahammond.com/

Claudia Anne Hammond (born 23 May 1971) is a British author, frequent radio presenter and podcast host for BBC Radio 4 and the BBC World Service, and occasional TV presenter.

== Early life ==
Hammond was born in the market town of Sandy in Bedfordshire on 23 May 1971, and grew up in the county.

== Education ==
Hammond was educated at Dame Alice Harpur School (a former independent school for girls in Bedford that is now part of Bedford Girls' School), which she left in 1989. She then studied applied psychology at the University of Sussex, moving on to the University of Surrey, where she gained an MSc in health psychology, carrying out research into doctor-patient communication in a breast cancer unit.

== Career ==
=== Author ===
Hammond is the author of five books. Her first, Emotional Rollercoaster, published in 2005, was on the science of emotions. Reviews were positive; one said that although it contained "rare errors" these mistakes are "vastly outweighed by the wealth of fascinating observations", and that "humour, sensitivity, and warmth... emanate from every page".

Hammond's second book, Time Warped: Unlocking the Mysteries of Time Perception, was published by Canongate Books in May 2012. The Financial Times called it "a fascinating and at times mind-boggling book that will change the way you think about time".

Mind Over Money: the psychology of money and how to use it better, published in May 2016 by Canongate. The Telegraph newspaper described this as "Part fascinating psychological exploration, part practical guide – exposing the myriad ways money messes with our heads and suggesting means by which we might get a handle on it".

In 2019, Canongate published her book The Art of Rest. The book draws on research from "The Rest Test", the largest global survey into rest, which was completed by 18,000 people across 135 countries.

In 2022, Hammond's fifth book "The Keys to Kindness: How to be kinder to yourself, others and the world" was published by Canongate.

=== Radio presenter and podcast host ===
Hammond has said that her decision to attempt to work in radio came early in her life and quite suddenly. "I was at a children's book festival and, after I had queued up to get Roald Dahl's autograph, he asked me what I wanted to do when I grew up. I'm told I said 'I want to work in radio'. That was the first my parents knew about it. It was probably the first time I realised." She presents programmes about psychology on BBC Radio 4, including All in the Mind. She also presents Health Check on BBC World Service Radio and The Evidence. She has presented many other series on BBC Radio 4, including Mind Changers, Anatomy of Rest, Anatomy of Touch, Anatomy of Loneliness, and Anatomy of Kindness. Each of the "Anatomy of…." series includes collaborations with university academics to conduct psychological research with a mass audience. For example, in 2020, she presented Inside Health – the Virus, a version of Inside Health during the COVID-19 pandemic. In October 2020, she presented the BBC Radio 4 programme, The Touch Test, analysing the results of a survey into the sense of touch. She also presented a 1: 45 programme called The Anatomy of Touch.

In March 2022, she presented the Radio 4 programme The Anatomy of Kindness, dealing with the results of the Kindness Test, a survey in which 60,000 respondents completed a questionnaire asking about human kindness.

=== TV presenter ===
For several years, Hammond was the presenter, along with Dr Ayan Panja, of a television programme called Health Check, broadcast on BBC World News. Hammond has appeared on several other TV programmes (such as The One Show and BBC Breakfast) commenting on psychological topics. In the past, as a reporter, she covered science and medical issues for Channel 5 News.

=== Academic work ===
In 2019, Hammond was appointed visiting professor of the Public Understanding of Psychology in the psychology department at the University of Sussex.

For many years, Hammond has lectured on the psychology of social issues as part of Boston University's Study Abroad programme in London.

=== Journalistic philosophy ===
Hammond has said she tries to "give people a better understanding of the role psychology plays. Helping people articulate and get across a seemingly technical piece of good research is central to my approach. I also like bringing different specialists together – it's amazing how often people who are hugely expert in one area of psychology know next to nothing about related work in a slightly different field."

Despite her varied portfolio, in one interview Hammond gave as a piece of career advice to "be choosy", and not accept everything, even though popular programmes might be fine: "I sometimes go on Richard & Judy to talk about psychological research – but if I think a show is going to dumb it down, I say no. And sometimes what they're looking for is a qualified therapist, and that's not me."

=== Awards and nominations ===
Year	Organisation	Category	Result
2017	The British Academy	President's Medal	Winner ("for her work in improving public understanding of psychology through broadcasting and writing for wider audiences")
2014	Mind Media Awards	Award for Radio	Winner (for All in the Mind)
2013	British Psychological Society	Popular Science Book Award	Winner (for the book Time Warped)
2013	Aeon magazine	Transmission Award	Winner (for the book Time Warped)
2012	British Neuroscience Association	Public Understanding of Neuroscience	Award Winner
2012	Society for Personality & Social Psychology	Media Achievement	Award Winner
2012	Association of British Science Writers	Best radio programme	Shortlisted (for Mind Myths)
2011	British Psychological Society	Award for Public Engagement & Media	Winner
2011	Mind Media Awards	'Making A Difference' Award	Winner (For All in the Mind)
2010	The Population Institute's Global Media Awards	Best Radio Programme	Winner
2009	Mental Health Media Awards	Best Factual Radio Programme	Shortlisted
2009	PPA Magazine	Columnist of the Year	Highly Commended
2008	Premio Luchetta Award for International Humanitarian Journalism		Shortlisted
2008	Medical Journalism Awards		Shortlisted
2007	Association of British Science Writers	Science Writing in a Non-science Context	Shortlisted
2000	Mental Health Media Awards		Runner-up
