= List of schools in Bedfordshire =

There is no county-wide local education authority in Bedfordshire, instead education services are provided by the three smaller unitary authorities of Bedford, Central Bedfordshire and Luton:

- List of schools in Bedford
- List of schools in Central Bedfordshire
- List of schools in Luton
