= De Parys =

Area of Bedford, England

Coordinates: 52.14461°N 0.45836°W

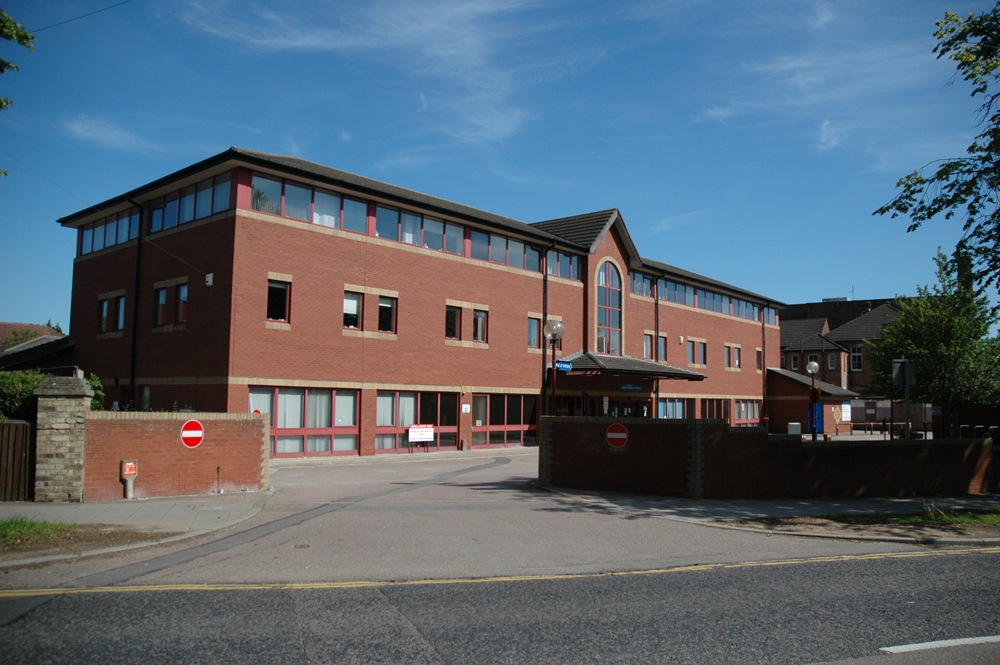
- Gilbert Hitchcock House, part of the Bedford Health Village in De Parys

- Location within Bedfordshire
- Population: 5,369; 7,209 (2011 Census. Ward)
- OS grid reference: TL055507
- Unitary authority: Bedford
- Ceremonial county: Bedfordshire
- Region: East
- Country: England
- Sovereign state: United Kingdom
- Post town: BEDFORD
- Postcode district: MK40, MK41
- Dialling code: 01234
- Police: Bedfordshire
- Fire: Bedfordshire
- Ambulance: East of England
- UK Parliament: Bedford

De Parys is an electoral ward and area within the town of Bedford, Bedfordshire, England.

The boundaries of De Parys are approximately Bedford Park and Stancliffe Road to the north, the Bedford campus of the University of Bedfordshire to the east, Goldington Road to the south, with De Parys Avenue to the west.

The Devon Park and Saints neighbourhoods are within De Parys ward, as is the Bedford campus of the University of Bedfordshire. De Parys is the smallest ward (in terms of population) in Bedford.

== History ==
Bedford's workhouse was established in the area in the 18th century. The west and central parts of De Parys were urbanised by the end of the 19th century. It was during this time that Bedford School located to the area, and Bedford Park was established.

The Bedford Training College for Teachers (later, Bedford College of Education) was established on Polhill Avenue in 1882. The eastern part of De Parys was developed later, in the 1960s. It was at this time that the old workhouse building became part of Bedford Hospital. In 1976 Bedford College of Education merged with other colleges to form Bedford College of Higher Education. This in turn became De Montfort University in 1994.

In 2006 the Bedford arm of De Montfort University and the University of Luton formed the University of Bedfordshire. The Bedford Campus has seen significant investment since then, including new student accommodation, a new library and new theatre. There has now been a college of Higher Education on Polhill Avenue in the De Parys area for over 125 years.

The university campus was an official training site for the 2012 Summer Olympics and Paralympics, and was a main hub for other training sites in the Bedford area. The Maldives National Olympic Committee based its competing athletes at the campus, while Paralympic athletes from Angola, the Central African Republic, Democratic Republic of the Congo, The Gambia, Ghana, Côte d'Ivoire, Jamaica, Lesotho, Morocco, Niger, Pakistan, Senegal, Tunisia and Uganda were also based at the Bedford campus in De Parys. With the exception of Weymouth (which hosted various sailing events) Bedford accommodated more Olympic teams in 2012 than any other town or borough in the United Kingdom.

== Governance ==
De Parys is an unparished area, with all community services under the direct control of Bedford Borough Council. De Parys elects two councillors to Bedford Borough Council, both of whom are currently from the Liberal Democrats.

== Economy ==
There is a small Budgens supermarket and post office located on Kimbolton Road. This is also where the old workhouse building is located. Bedford Hospital is currently re-developing the site to become the Bedford Health Village.

There is a shopping parade on Chiltern Avenue which includes a small supermarket, an off-licence, a florists, a hairdresser and a laundrette.

The Bedford Blues Rugby Club is situated on Goldington Road in the area. There are also offices, pubs, and convenience stores along Goldington Road.

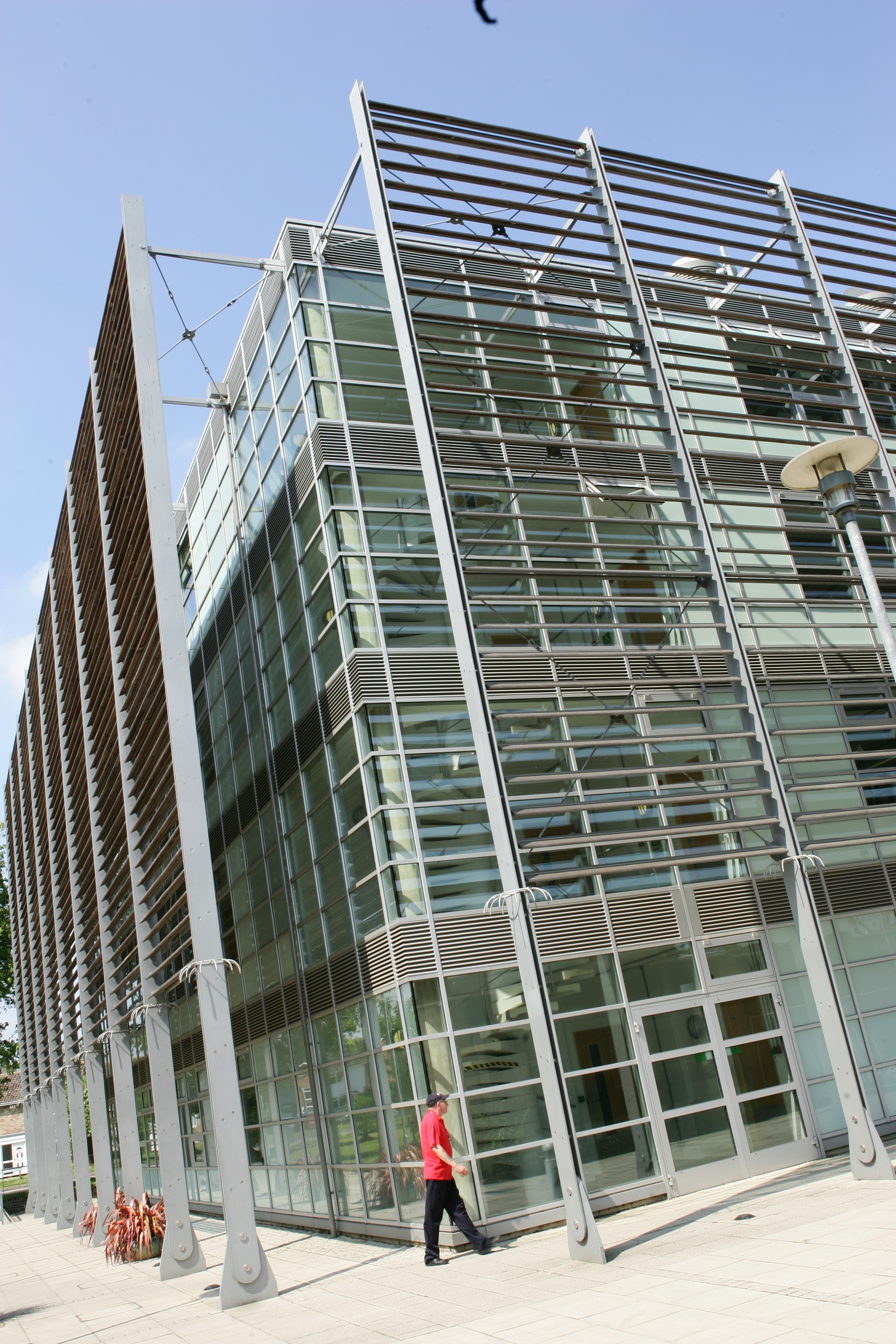
University of Bedfordshire (Bedford Campus) in De Parys

There are more offices, shops, restaurants and clubs located on St Peters Street which form a small part of Bedford's central business district.

== Education ==
St John Rigby Primary School is located on Polhill Avenue. The school is Roman Catholic, and does not have a catchment area. other primary school age children in De Parys usually attend schools in the nearby Putnoe or Brickhill or Harpur areas. Also on Polhill Avenue are Castle Newnham School and Goldington Academy, both of which educate secondary school age pupils.

There are two independent schools in the area - Bedford School located on De Parys Avenue, and Bedford Greenacre Independent School situated on Kimbolton Road.

The Bedford campus of the University of Bedfordshire is situated on Polhill Avenue on the edge of the neighbourhood. The university attracts students from all over the United Kingdom as well as local and international students, with many choosing to live in De Parys as well as study there.

== Religious sites ==
- St Andrew's Church (Church of England), located on Kimbolton Road
- First Church of Christ, Scientist, also on Kimbolton Road
- St Peter's Church, Bedford (Church of England), located on St Peters Street

== Community facilities ==
Bedford Park is located in the north-west of De Parys. It is the main open space for the area. There is also the old Bedford cemetery located next to the park. Robinson Pool, a municipal swimming pool is situated on Park Avenue. There is a bowling green situated on Goldington Road.

De Parys is the location of the Goldington Road Stadium, where Bedford Blues Rugby Union Club are based. Bedford Blues currently play in the RFU Championship league.

The University of Bedfordshire Theatre is a located in the area. The venue hosts a variety of plays and productions, and is one of the largest theatres in Bedfordshire. The Quarry Theatre is also located in the area on St Peters Street. This theatre is operated by Bedford School.
