= St Peter's Church, Bedford =

Coordinates: 52.1393°N 0.4660°W

St. Peter's Church
- The Parish Church of St Peter de Merton with St Cuthbert
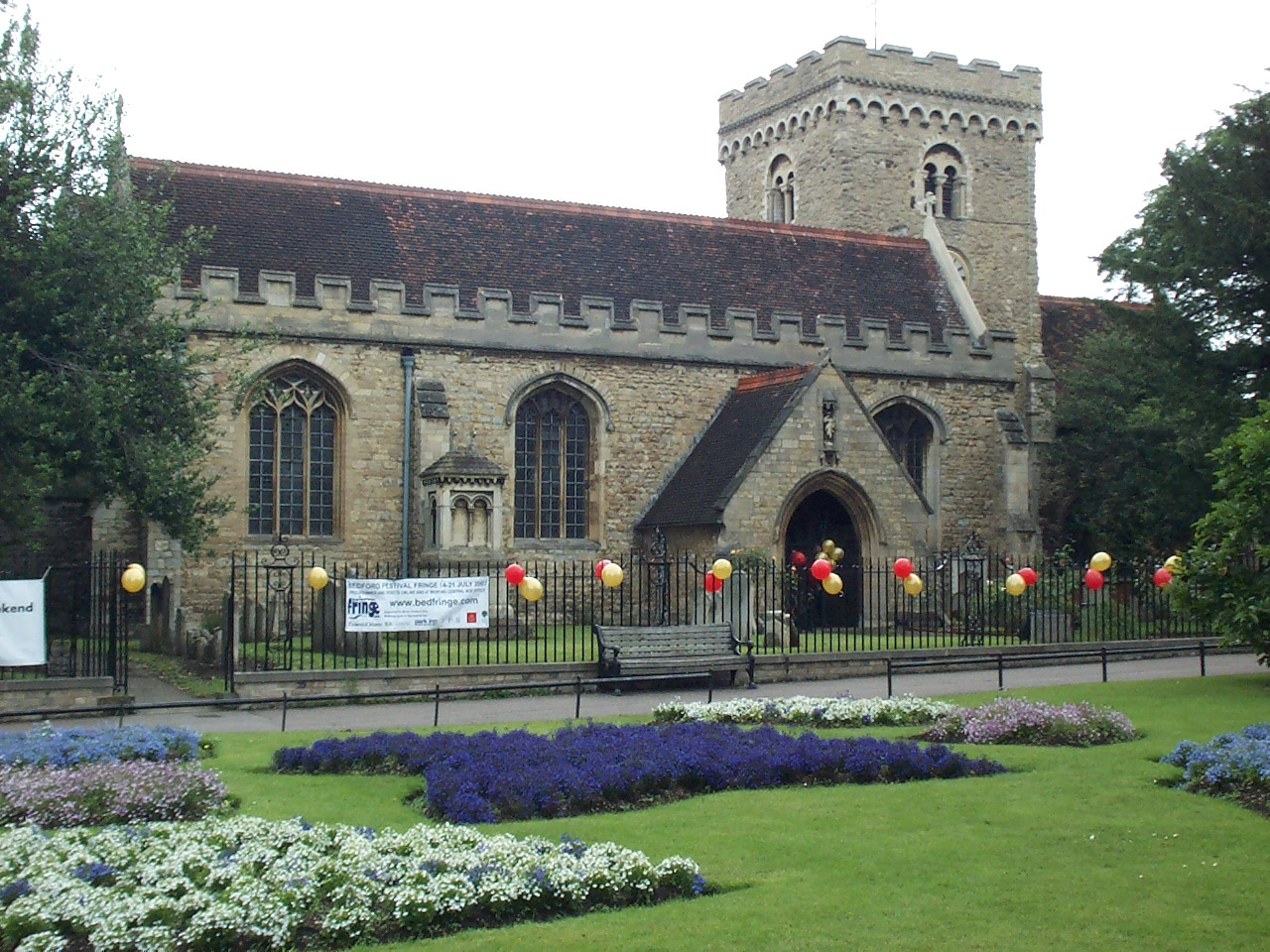
- St. Peter's Church
- Country: England
- Denomination: Church of England

History
- Status: Parish church
- Dedication: Saint Peter; Cuthbert of Lindisfarne

Architecture
- Functional status: Active

Administration
- Province: Canterbury
- Diocese: St Albans
- Archdeaconry: Bedford
- Deanery: Bedford

The Parish Church of St Peter de Merton with St Cuthbert is an Anglican church on St Peter's Street in the De Parys area of Bedford, Bedfordshire, England.

== History ==
The site has been used for Christian worship for more than a millennium. Although the current church is not that old and ruins of the earliest churches—probably built of wood—are no longer present, it does still house architectural artifacts among the oldest in Bedford. At one time, appointments within the church were made by the Augustinian Canons who had founded Merton Priory in Surrey. Their connection persists in the name 'de Merton' even though the English Crown took over patronage of St Peter after the Dissolution of the Monasteries of the 16th century.

The rubble and cement tower of the church was constructed in Saxon times, as was an arch and a doorway which are set in the belfry's east wall. Notable Norman work in the church building includes an exterior doorway arch (originally from another Bedford Church) in the south porch. The chancel's font, priest's door and windows were added in the 13th and 14th centuries. A reproduction of an original fenestella from this time was added in the south wall of the sanctuary in the 19th century.

The historian Rory Naismith states that it is not known where Offa, king of the Mercians, is buried, but the most likely location is St Peter's Church on the north side of Saxon Bedford.

As well as the 19th century additions to St Peter's previously mentioned, the church was enlarged at this time, and restoration work was undertaken. Additions included the vestry, aisles and west porch, as well as an extension to the nave. Work to the building in the 20th century included the paintings on the east wall, the tower ceiling decoration, the construction of the chapter house and the Burma Star stained glass window. Following the closure of the neighbouring parish church of St. Cuthberts in 1974, St. Peter's was also dedicated to Cuthbert of Lindisfarne.

== The church today ==
St Peter's Church is an Anglican Parish Church in the heart of Bedford. The church is part of the Bedford Council of Faiths, and has many links to other churches and community groups. It has moved liturgically under the latest Rectors leadership, Revd Kelvin Woolmer, to becoming a missional evangelistic worshipping community. Open to all, with an acceptance of the individuals sexuality and acceptance of gender identity. It is multi ethnic and diverse in ages. Making it a place where all are accepted.

== See also ==
- Church of the Sacred Heart of Jesus and St Cuthbert, original site of St. Cuthbert's Parish Church
