= Browns Wood Local Nature Reserve =

Nature reserve in Bedfordshire, England

Coordinates: 52.1797°N 0.5016°W

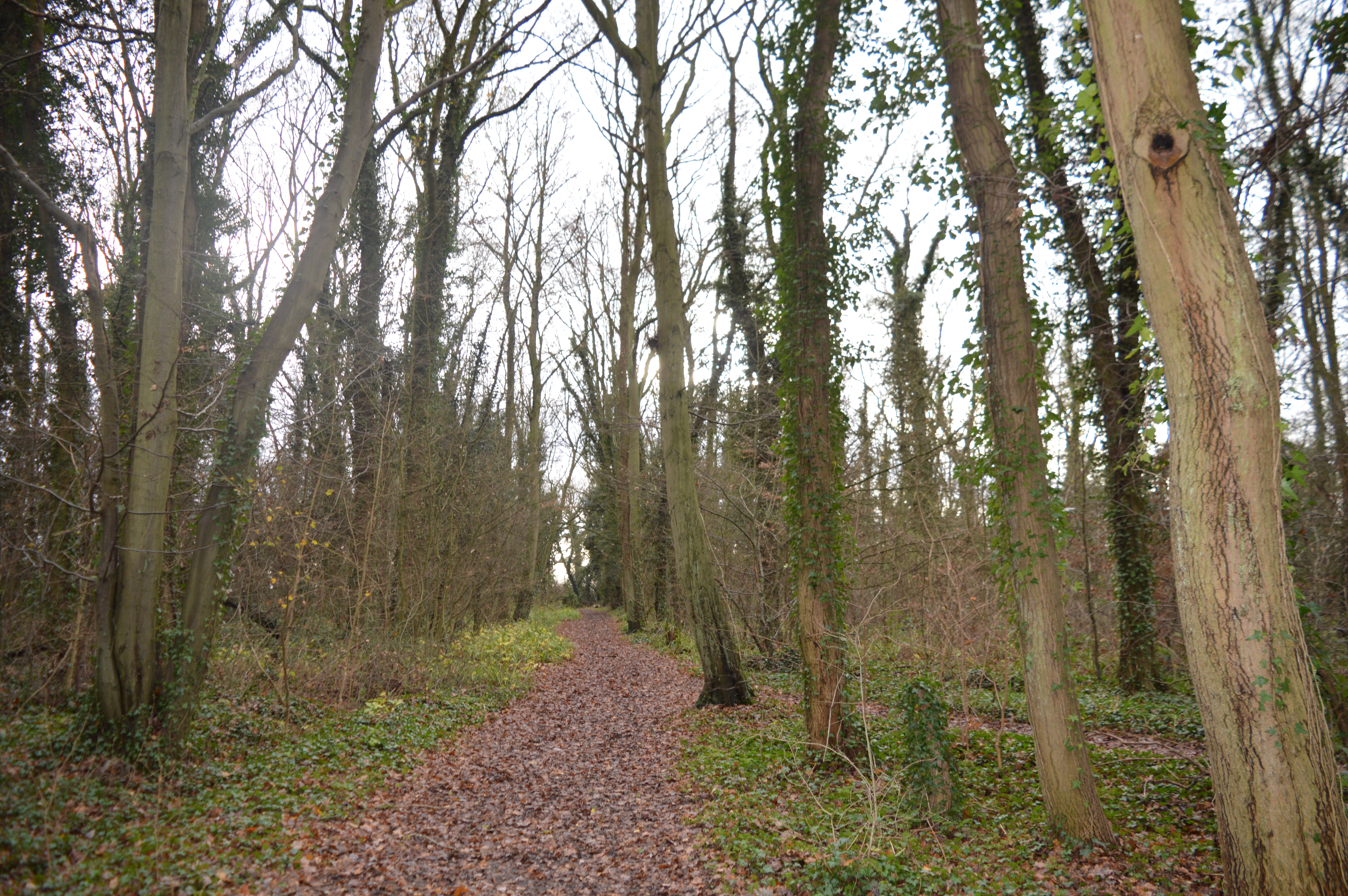

Browns Wood is a six hectare Local Nature Reserve north of Clapham in Bedfordshire. It is owned and managed by Bedford Borough Council.

The wood was planted by the Duke of Bedford in the middle of the eighteenth century. It is ancient semi-natural woodland of beech, larch and poplar. Ground flora include wood anemone and nettle leaved bellflower, and there are birds such as great spotted woodpeckers and song thrushes.

There is access from Twinwood Road.
