= Ridgeway School, Kempston =

Ridgeway School

Location
- Hill Rise; Kempston, Bedfordshire, MK42 7EB; England; 52.109°N 0.510°W

Information
- Type: Community special school
- Established: 1974
- Local authority: Bedford
- Department for Education URN: 109742 Tables
- Ofsted: Reports
- Head Teacher: Andrew Munday
- Gender: Mixed
- Age: 2 to 19
- Enrolment: 83 as of January 2022
- Website: http://www.ridgewayschool.org.uk/

Ridgeway School is a mixed special school for pupils with physical disabilities located in Kempston, Bedfordshire, England. The school accepts pupils from all over the Borough of Bedford.

== History ==
Opened in January 1974 in a purpose built single storey building, Ridgeway School is situated on an educational campus in Kempston, which includes a Child Development Centre and Kempston Academy.

In October 2009, Bedford Borough Council launched a consultation on the future of special education provision in the borough. The consultation included options to merge Ridgeway School with the nearby Grange School on the Ridgeway site. Another proposal involved merging the two schools with St John’s School to create one special school for the whole of the Borough of Bedford. In January 2010, Bedford Borough Council confirmed its intention to merge Ridgeway School and Grange School on the Ridgeway site in the next few years. The new combined school was planned to be rebuilt to accommodate the broader range of pupils. However, in March 2013 Grange School converted to academy status and the move is on hold.

Three new classrooms were constructed at Ridgeway School for use at the start of September 2013. The classrooms are primarily used for sixth form classes.

== Academics ==
The school is organised into two departments, which fit the traditional school transfer age from primary to secondary education. The Primary Department covers Early Years education, Key Stage 1 and Key Stage 2 (ages 3 – 11), whilst the Secondary Department covers Key Stage 3, Key Stage 4 and Post 16 education (ages 11 – 19).
