= Cottage Bottom Fields =

Nature reserve in Bedfordshire, England

Coordinates: 51.874724°N 0.489977°W

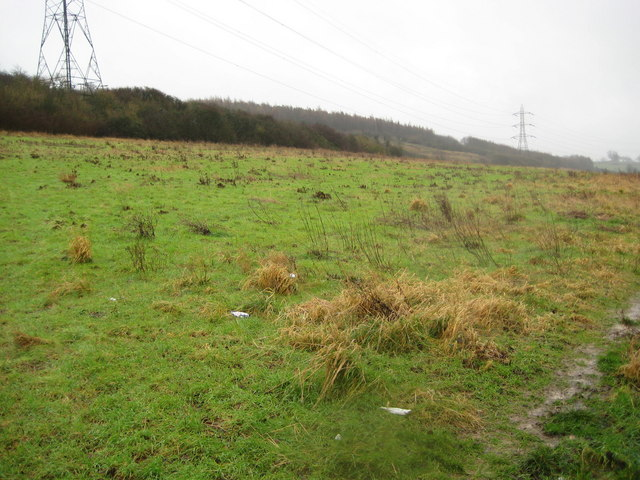

Cottage Bottom Fields is a 14.1 hectare local nature reserve in Dunstable in Bedfordshire. It is owned and managed by Central Bedfordshire Council.

The site is chalk grassland on a steep slope, and the wide variety of flowers include what may be the largest population of pignut in the country. Birds include Northern wheatears, European stonechat, whinchat and ring ouzels.

There is access from Dunstable Road.

== See also ==
- Countryside sites in South Central Bedfordshire, Central Bedfordshire Council
