= Harpur Trust =

Charity in Bedford, England

Coordinates: 52.150°N 0.459°W

- Founded: 1566
- Founder: Sir William Harpur
- Type: Charitable trust
- Purpose: Education and Almshouses
- Location: Princeton Court, Pilgrim Centre, Brickhill Drive, Bedford, England
- Revenue: £72,951,000 (2025)
- Expenses: £72,827,000 (2025)
- Website: www.harpurtrust.org.uk

The Harpur Trust is a charitable foundation in Bedford, England. Founded in 1566 by Sir William Harpur and his wife Dame Alice Harpur, it supports education and community projects in the Borough of Bedford. Its charitable purposes include the promotion of education, the relief of poverty, sickness and distress, and the provision of recreational facilities for social welfare.

The Trust owns and operates four independent schools in Bedford: Bedford School, Bedford Modern School, Bedford Girls' School and Pilgrims Pre-Preparatory School. In addition to its educational activities, the Trust provides grants, bursaries and other support to organisations and individuals in Bedford Borough.

== History ==
Harpur Trust Act 1764
- Act of Parliament
- Parliament of Great Britain
- Long title: An Act for enlarging the charitable Uses, extending the Objects, and regulating the Application of the Rents and Profits, of the Estates given by Sir William Harpur Knight and Dame Alice his Wife, for the Benefit of the Poor, and other Objects of Charity, of the Town of Bedford.
- Citation: 4 Geo. 3. c. 72
- Territorial extent: Great Britain

Dates
- Royal assent: 19 April 1764
- Commencement: 15 November 1763 (Note: Start of session.)
- Repealed: 26 May 1826
Other legislation
Repealed by	Bedford School Act 1826

Status: Repealed

The Harpur Trust has its origins in the philanthropy of Sir William Harpur, a Bedford-born merchant who became Lord Mayor of London in 1561. He was knighted the following year.

In 1566, Harpur and his wife Dame Alice endowed property for charitable purposes in Bedford. The endowment included land in Bedford and approximately 13 acres (5.3 ha) of water-meadows in Holborn, then on the outskirts of London. As London expanded, the Holborn land increased substantially in value and became an important source of income for the charity.

The endowment was intended to support education and relieve poverty in Bedford. In 1566, the charity endowed Bedford School, which had been established under a royal charter in 1552, and established a writing school which later became Bedford Modern School.

The charity's activities were subsequently regulated by a series of Acts of Parliament, the Harpur Trust Act 1764 (4 Geo. 3. c. 72) enlarged its charitable purposes and regulated the use of the income from the Harpur estates. The Act was repealed in 1826 by the Bedford School Act 1826.

Provision for girls' education was later added to the charity's activities. In 1882, the Trust established what became the Dame Alice Harpur School. The school merged with Bedford High School in 2010 to form Bedford Girls' School.

The organisation was for a period legally known as The Bedford Charity (the Harpur Trust). It was reorganised as a limited company by guarantee in 2012.

== Activities ==
=== Independent schools ===
The Harpur Trust owns and operates four fee-charging independent schools in Bedford, which together educate more than 3,000 pupils.

The schools are:

- Bedford School, a boarding and day school for boys aged 7 to 18;
- Bedford Modern School, a co-educational day school for pupils aged 7 to 18;
- Bedford Girls' School, a day school for girls aged 7 to 18; and
- Pilgrims Pre-Preparatory School, a co-educational school for younger children.

The Trust also operates a bursary programme intended to provide access to its senior schools for pupils whose families would otherwise be unable to afford the fees. In the 2023–24 financial year, 183 pupils across its three senior schools received bursary awards.

=== State education ===
The Trust entered the state education sector through its sponsorship of Bedford Academy, which opened in 2010. In 2017, HEART Academies Trust was established as a multi-academy trust sponsored by the Harpur Trust.

HEART Academies Trust comprises Bedford Academy, Cauldwell Primary School, Shackleton Primary School and Shortstown Primary School. The schools are operated by HEART rather than directly by the Harpur Trust.

The Harpur Trust also works with other state schools and early-years providers in Bedford Borough through education programmes intended to improve outcomes for disadvantaged children.

=== Grants and community work ===
The Trust provides financial support to charities, community organisations and individuals in Bedford Borough. It states that it awards more than £1 million a year in grants to local charities and community groups and has awarded more than £11 million over a ten-year period.

=== Almhouses and housing ===
The Harpur Trust also owns almhouses in Bedford and the nearby village of Bromham. Its housing activities have historically focused on providing affordable accommodation for older people from the Bedford area.

It has invested in a number of extra-care housing developments in Bedford Borough, including Dame Alice Court, Oak Way House, Sir William Harpur House and Wixams Retirement Village. These developments are operated by partner housing organisations.

== Finances ==
In the financial year ending 30 June 2025, the Harpur Trust reported total income of £72.951 million and expenditure of £72.827 million. At the end of the year, it had net assets of £231.781 million, including £128.311 million in endowed funds.

== Governance ==
The Harpur Trust is registered with the Charity Commission for England and Wales as charity number 1066861. It is governed by a board of trustees.

As of 2026, the chair of the board is Rhian Castell and the chief executive is David Steadman.
