= Kimberley College =

Location
- Green Lane; Stewartby, Bedfordshire, MK43 9LY; England; 52.0721°N 0.5246°W

Information
- Type: Free school sixth form
- Established: 2013
- Department for Education URN: 139798 Tables
- Ofsted: Reports
- Principal: Tim Detheridge
- Gender: Coeducational
- Age: 16 to 19
- Capacity: 700
- Colour: Purple
- Website: https://www.kimberleycollege.co.uk

Kimberley College (also known as STEM College) is a free school sixth form centre that opened in Stewartby, Bedfordshire, England in September 2013. The college is operated by Wootton Academy Trust, who also operate Wootton Upper School.

Kimberley College specialises in STEM (Science, Technology, Engineering and Mathematics), and offers a range of A levels and BTECs related to the specialisms. The college accepts students from Bedford, Bletchley and Milton Keynes, as well as the villages in between these areas.
