= Wootton Upper School =

Wootton Academy

Location
- Hall End Road, Wootton; Bedford, Bedfordshire, MK43 9HT; England; 52°05′43″N 0°32′27″W

Information
- Type: Academy
- Motto: The pursuit of excellence
- Established: 1975
- Local authority: Bedford Borough
- Specialist: Performing Arts
- Department for Education URN: 137522 Tables
- Ofsted: Reports
- Head of School: Carrie McMorn
- Gender: Mixed
- Age: 11 to 19
- Enrolment: 1,350 (as of 2026)
- Houses: Explorer, Navigator, Voyager, Pathfinder
- Colours: Black and Green (As of Sept 2026)
- Website: https://woottonacademytrust.co.uk/about/

Wootton Academy is an academy school located on Hall End Road, in Wootton, England. It teaches years 7-11 in compulsory education and years 12–13 in compulsory education at Kimberley College. Approximately 75% of students previously in compulsory education stay on to the sixth form college. The school specialises in performing arts, such as music, drama and dance.

== History ==
Wootton Upper School started in 1975. As the school buildings were not quite ready, it shared a site with Stewartby Middle School. The first intake was 213 students and they moved onto the Wootton site in November, with 16 teaching staff.

The first headmaster was Stanley Clews. The school was complete by 1978. Clews retired in 1987. Catherine Mackenzie took over until 1999, when Anthony Withell became head. In 2014 Michael Gleeson became principal of the school. In 2020 Carrie McMorn became headteacher.

The school was awarded Beacon Status in 2001.

== Kimberley College ==
Kimberley College is a new Sixth form college that opened in Stewartby in April 2014. The college is operated by Wootton Academy Trust, and the two centres share facilities for their sixth form students.
