= Grange Academy, Kempston =

Grange Academy

Location
- Halsey Road; Kempston, Bedfordshire, MK42 8AU; England; 52.121°N 0.493°W

Information
- Type: Special school;Academy
- Established: 1 March 2013
- Department for Education URN: 139374 Tables
- Ofsted: Reports
- Gender: Coeducational
- Age: 5 to 16
- Website: http://www.grange.beds.sch.uk/

Grange Academy (formerly Grange School) is a coeducational special school located in Kempston, Bedfordshire, England. The school accepts pupils between the ages of 5 and 16 years with Moderate Learning Difficulties from all over the Borough of Bedford.

The school is currently organised into two departments:

- The Primary Department covering Key Stage 1 and Key Stage 2 (ages 5 – 11)
- The Secondary Department covering Key Stage 3 and Key Stage 4 (ages 11 – 16)

In October 2009, Bedford Borough Council launched a consultation on the future of special education provision in the borough. The consultation included options to merge Grange School with the nearby Ridgeway School on the Ridgeway site. Another proposal considered merging the two schools with St John's School to create a single special school for the entire Borough of Bedford. In January 2010, Bedford Borough Council confirmed its intention to merge Grange School and Ridgeway School on the Ridgeway site in the coming years. The new combined school would be rebuilt to accommodate the broader range of pupils expected to attend.

However, in May 2012, Grange School submitted an application to become an academy. The application was successful, and the school converted to academy status in March 2013, being renamed Grange Academy. The school is now independent of Bedford Borough Council control, which will impact plans for the merger.
