= Kim Pearce =

English theatre director

Kim Pearce is an English theatre director.

== Education ==
Pearce studied at Warwick University then trained on the Theatre Directing MFA at Birkbeck College, University of London.

== Work ==
=== Selected theatre productions ===
- Forgotten by Daniel York at the Arcola Theatre
- Love Steals Us From Loneliness at Camden People's Theatre and Chapter Arts Centre
- Unearthed on UK tour
- Solomon Child at the Manchester Royal Exchange Studio
- Cheaper Than Roses at Warwick Arts Centre Studio
- The Skriker at Warwick Arts Centre Studio

=== Other work ===
- The Curious Incident of the Dog in the Night-Time UK and Ireland Tour, Resident Director, 2014-15
- The Suicide at the National Theatre, Staff Director
- Moon Tiger at the Theatre Royal, Bath and UK tour, Assistant Director
- Ghosts for ETT, Assistant Director
- Sweeney Todd at Chichester, Assistant Director
- The Way of the World at Chichester, Assistant Director
- A View from the Bridge at the Royal Exchange, Assistant Director
- Zack at the Royal Exchange, Assistant Director
- The Lady from the Sea at the Royal Exchange, Assistant Director
- Mogadishu at the Royal Exchange and Lyric Theatre (Hammersmith), Assistant Director

Pearce was associate director of the pop-up Theatre On The Fly venue created with Assemble at Chichester Festival Theatre.

She is Associate Director for Papergang Theatre, and is a dramaturge for Yellow Earth Theatre and Gaggle Productions.

== Awards ==
Pearce was awarded a 2011/12 Regional Young Directors Scheme bursary and runner-up for the 2013 JMK Young Director award.
