= Stotfold Mill Meadows =

Local Nature Reserve in Bedfordshire

Coordinates: 52.014775°N 0.217135°W

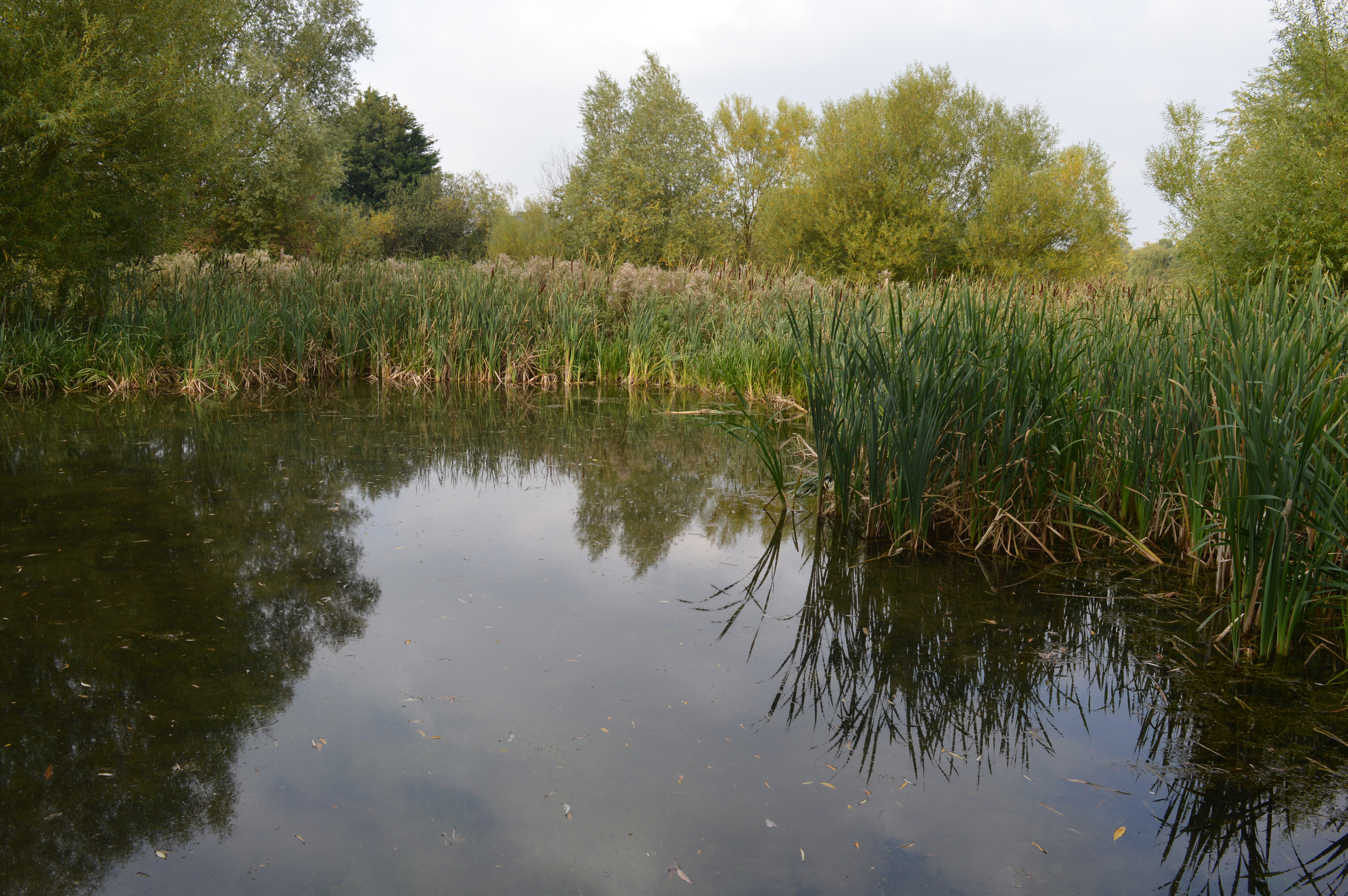

Stotfold Mill Meadows is a 3.4 hectare Local Nature Reserve (LNR) in Stotfold in Bedfordshire. It was declared an LNR by Central Bedfordshire Council in 2010, and is managed by the Stotfold Mill Preservation Trust, which also runs the neighbouring Stotfold Watermill.

The meadows are on the east bank of the River Ivel, and have water birds and invertebrates such as frogs, toads and newts. The site also has meadows with a number of ponds, and an area of woodland.

There is access from Mill Lane.
