= St John's School and College =

St John’s School and College

Location
- Austin Canons; Bedford Road; Kempston, Bedfordshire, MK42 8AA; England
- Coordinates: 52.126°N 0.482°W

Information
- Type: Special school; Academy
- Local authority: Bedford
- Department for Education URN: 137469 Tables
- Ofsted: Reports
- Headteacher: Ron Babbage
- Gender: Mixed
- Age: 2 to 19
- Enrolment: 157 as of January 2016
- Website: http://www.st-johns-school.co.uk/

St John’s School and College is a mixed special school located in Kempston, Bedfordshire, England. The school educates pupils ages 2 to 19 from all over the Borough of Bedford.

== History ==
In October 2009, Bedford Borough Council launched a consultation on the future of special education provision in the borough. The consultation included options to move St John’s School to an educational campus in Biddenham. Another proposal involved merging St John's School with Grange School and Ridgeway School to create one special school for the whole of the Borough of Bedford. In January 2010, Bedford Borough Council confirmed its intention to move St John’s School in the next few years to a new campus on the site of Biddenham Upper School in Biddenham.

However, 1 September 2011, the school officially gained academy status, meaning that Bedford Borough Council no longer have control over the school. The planned move of the school is not due to proceed.

== Academics ==
The school is for pupils between the ages of 2 and 19 years of age, whose special educational needs fall predominantly within the category of Severe Learning Difficulties, although other physical or behavioural difficulties may also be present.

St John’s School is currently organised into two departments:

- The Primary Department for pupils aged 2 – 11
- The Secondary Department for pupils aged 11 – 19

Facilities for pupils at the school include an indoor heated hydrotherapy swimming pool which includes a jacuzzi, changing rooms, toilets and shower areas. There also is an interactive light and sound room and 2 'rumpus rooms' to provide pupils with additional sensory experiences.
