= Hill Rise, Bedford =

Local nature reserve in Bedford, England

Coordinates: 52.148712°N 0.470495°W

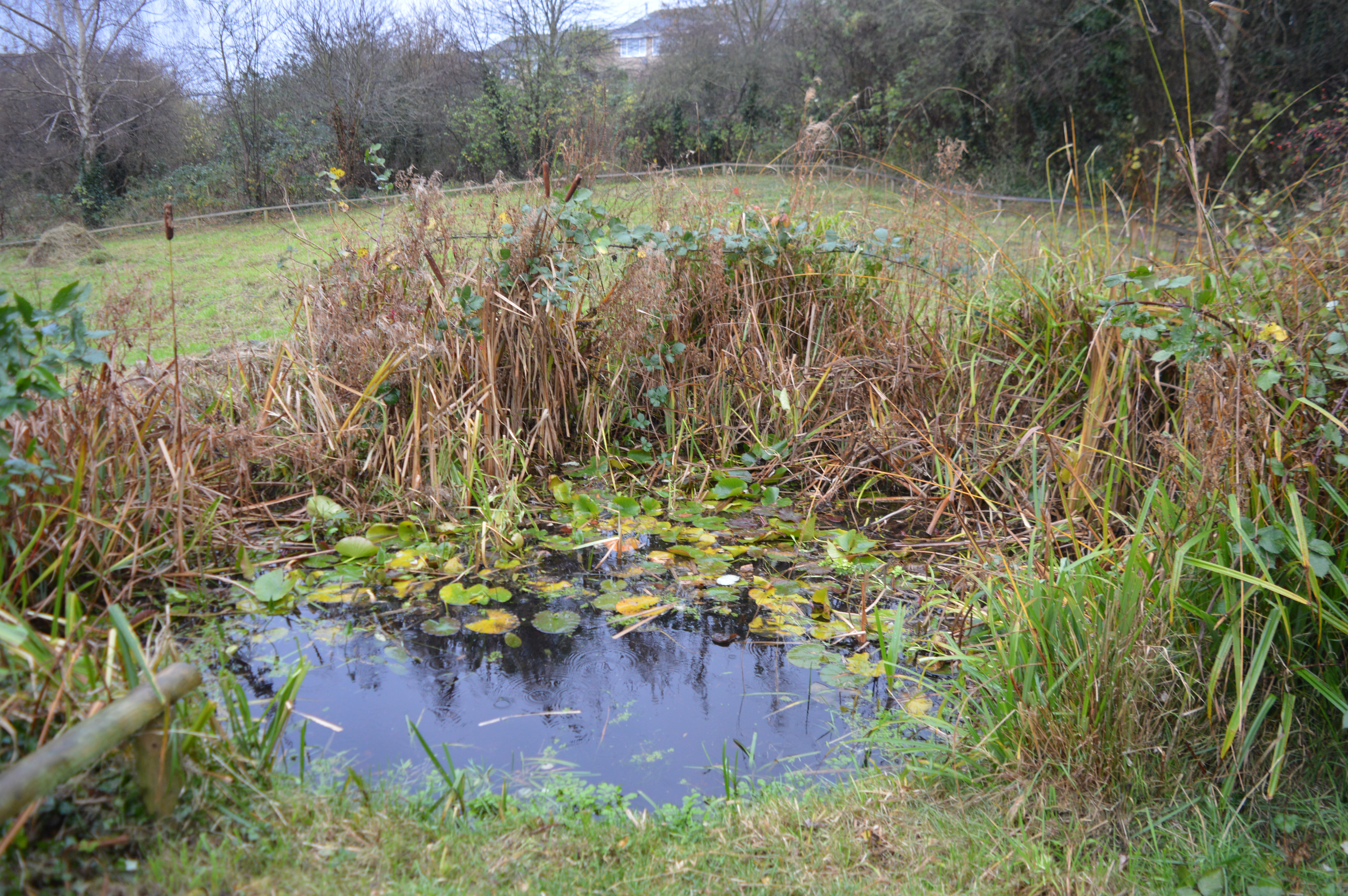

Hill Rise is a 0.9 hectare Local Nature Reserve (LNR) located in the Harpur area of Bedford. It is owned and managed by Bedford Borough Council.

The site was the Bedfordshire Training Home for Girls, founded in 1882 to prepare poor girls for domestic service. This closed by the 1970s, and the land became a derelict dumping ground. In the 1990s local residents campaigned for the site to become an LNR, and this was achieved in 1996. The small site is surrounded on three sides by houses, but it has a variety of habitats, woodland, meadow, scrub and two ponds. Wildlife includes muntjac deer, foxes, birds, dragonflies and butterflies.

There is access from Park Road North.
