= Bromham Lake =

Nature reserve in Bedfordshire, England

Coordinates: 52.1527°N 0.5025°W

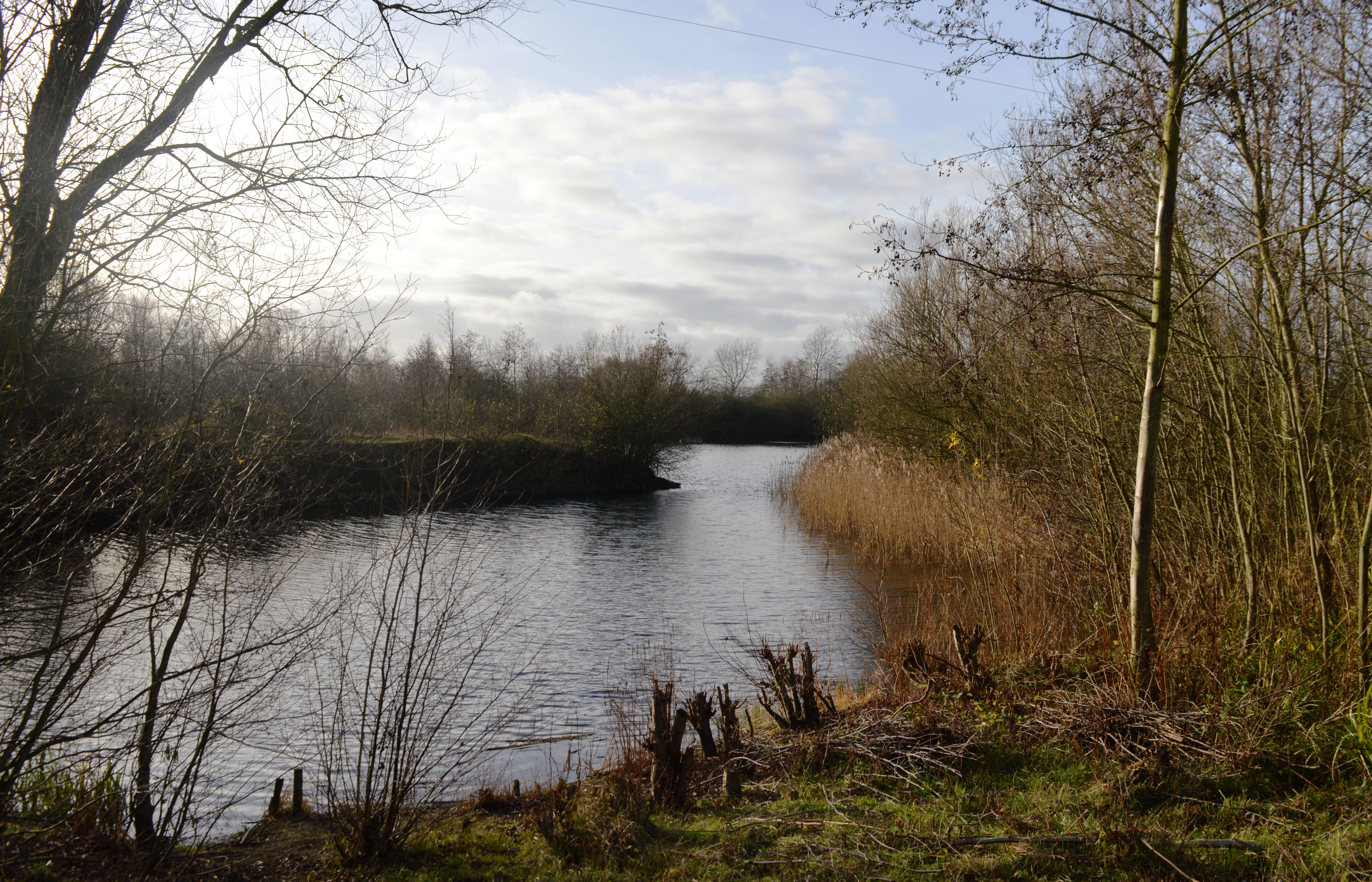

Bromham Lake is a 10.9 hectare Local Nature Reserve east of Bromham in Bedfordshire. It is owned and managed by Bedford Borough Council.

The lake was formed when the site was used for the extraction of sand, gravel and limestone between 1969 and 1975, and an Iron Age house was found during the extraction. In the 1980s the site was restored to become a nature reserve. The lake is important for aquatic birds such as terns and coot, and plants such as water crowfoot and reedmace. A wild flower meadow provides a habitat for butterflies. There is also woodland, grassland and a limestone cliff.

There is access from Lower Farm Road.
