= Institution of Diesel and Gas Turbine Engineers =

International professional association

- Abbreviation: IDGTE
- Formation: 1913
- Type: Professional organisation
- Legal status: Private company and registered charity (1139906)
- Purpose: Diesel engine and gas turbine industry in the UK
- Headquarters: Bedford Heights
- Location: Manton Lane, Bedford, MK41 7PH
- Region served: Worldwide
- Members: 500 diesel and gas turbine engineers
- Director General: Mike Raine
- Main organ: IDGTE Council (President - John Platt)
- Affiliations: Engineering Council
- Staff: 3
- Website: IDGTE

The Institution of Diesel and Gas Turbine Engineers is the professional association for engineers in the diesel and gas turbine industry in the UK and internationally.

Diesel engines and gas turbines are broadly related because they use a similar thermodynamic cycle, and both are often used (and interchangeable) for power generation for heating and electricity in large installations.

== History ==
It was established in 1913 as the Diesel Engine Users' Association. It changed to its current name in 1984.

== Structure ==
It is based in the north-west of Bedford towards Brickhill at Bedford Heights

Types of membership are Student, Associate, Member, Fellow, Retired, Retired Associate, Company and Subscriber.

== Function ==
It represents engineers in the diesel and gas turbine industry in the UK and internationally, enabling current knowledge to be widely known. It organises conferences and industry-based training.

It registers Chartered Engineers Incorporated Engineers and Engineering Technicians in the industry.

== See also ==
- Energy Institute
- Royal Aeronautical Society
- National Gas Turbine Establishment
