= Flitwick Wood =

Nature Reserve in Bedfordshire, England

Coordinates: 52.002664°N 0.510441°W

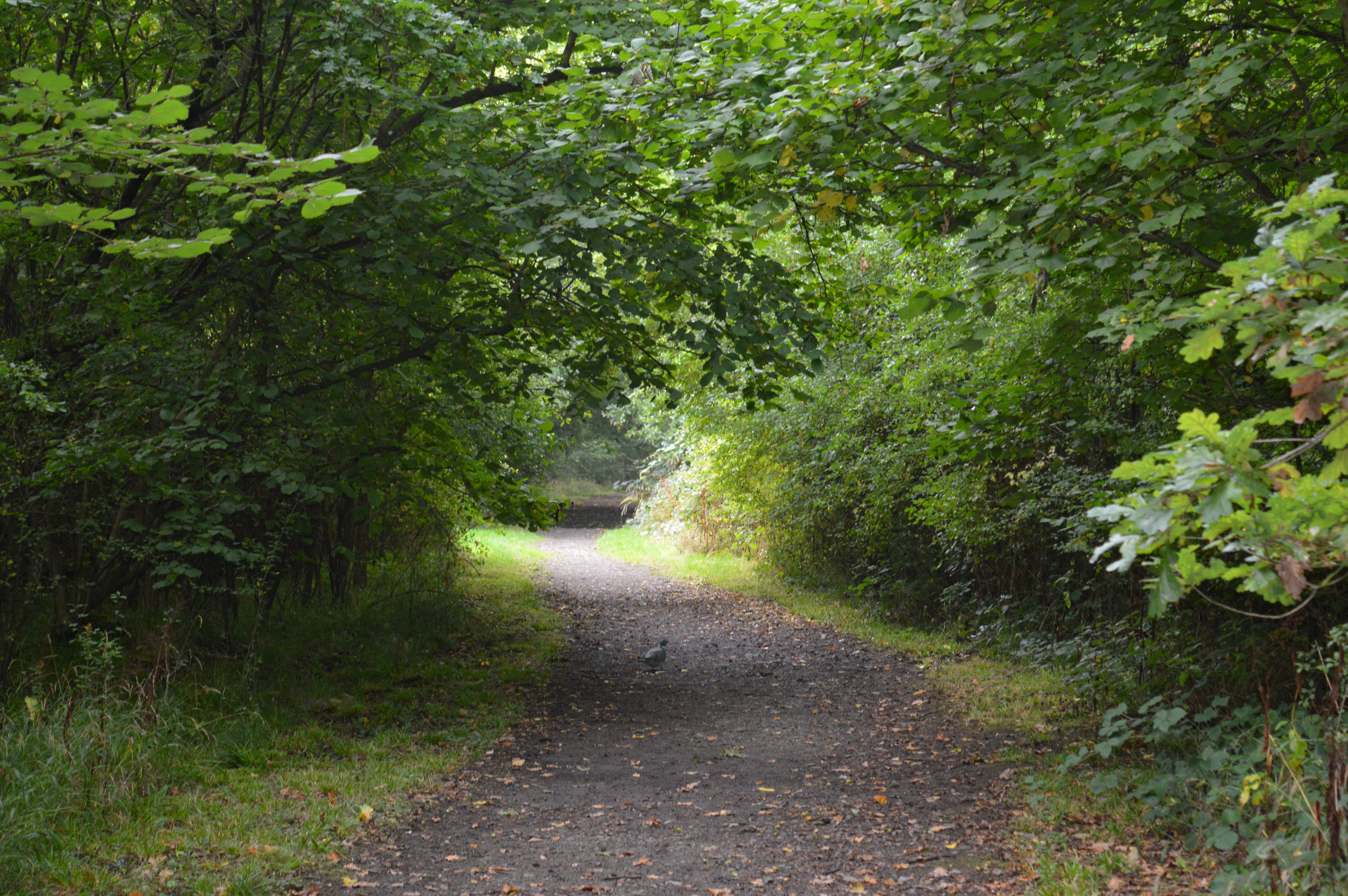

Flitwick Wood is a 14.2 hectares (35 acres) Local Nature Reserve in Flitwick in Bedfordshire. It is owned and managed by Central Bedfordshire Council.

The site is semi-natural woodland, with some ancient trees and others that have been recently planted. It has a varied flora, including wood anemones, wood spurges and primroses, and diverse birds, bats and insects.

There is access from several roads, including Mendip Close and Tennyson Road.
