= Flitton Moor =

Nature reserve in Bedfordshire, England

Coordinates: 52.012832°N 0.462018°W

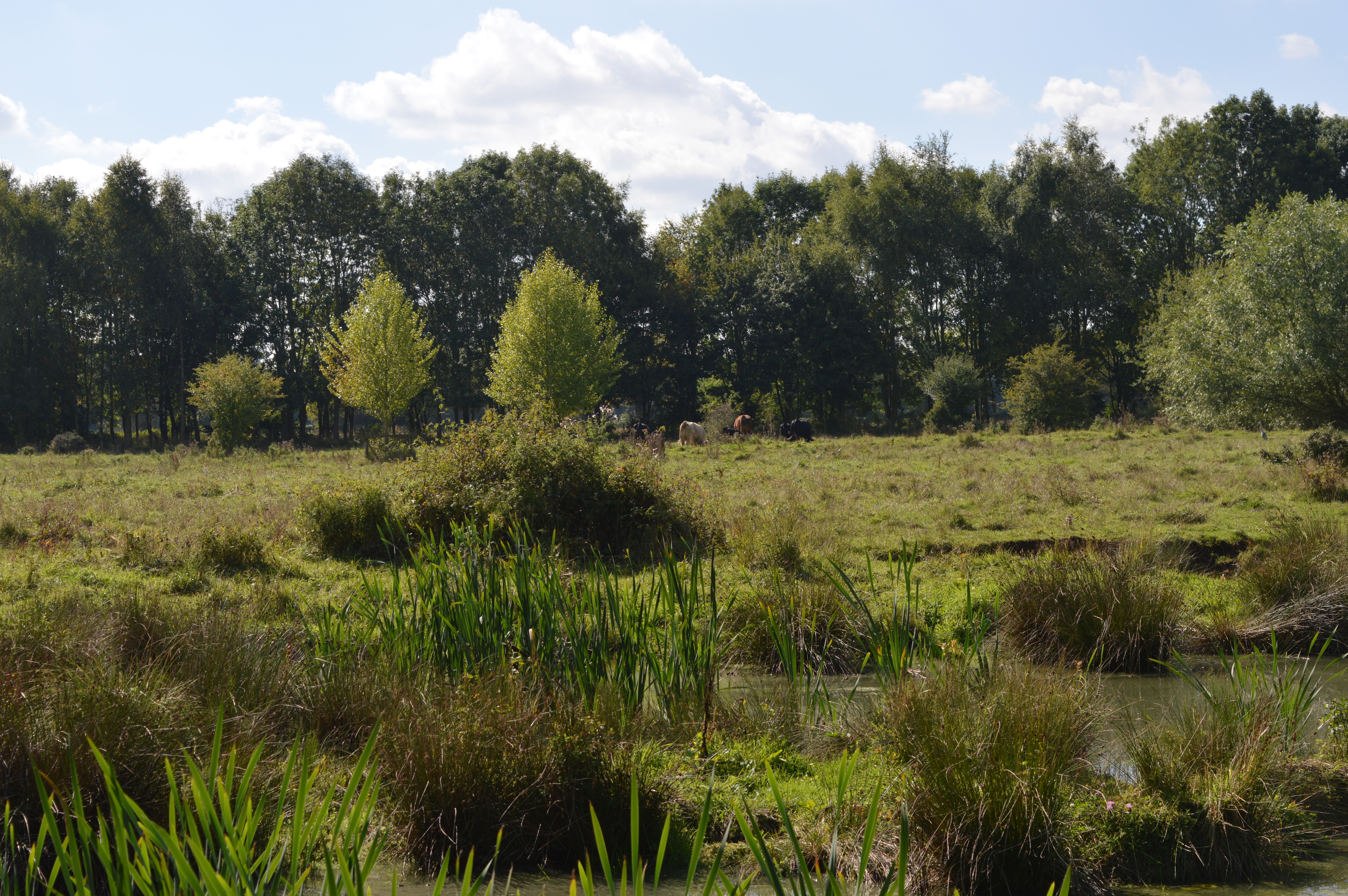

Flitton Moor is a 6.9 hectare Local Nature Reserve and County Wildlife Site in Flitton in Bedfordshire. It is owned by Central Bedfordshire Council and managed by the council together with The Greensand Trust.

The site was open moorland in the Middle Ages, but it was converted to agricultural land in the nineteenth century. The central area is pasture with a strip of woodland around the edge. Other habitats are fen and wetland. Trees there include osiers.

There is access from Brook Lane to a path through the woodland, but no public access to the central field.
