= Bedford Academy =

Location
- Mile Road; Bedford, Bedfordshire, MK42 9TR; England; 52.122°N 0.451°W

Information
- Type: Secondary Academy
- Established: 2010
- Department for Education URN: 136085 Tables
- Ofsted: Reports
- Principal: Christopher Deller
- Gender: Mixed
- Age: 11 to 18
- Enrolment: 1129
- Capacity: 1440
- Website: http://www.bedfordacademy.co.uk/

Bedford Academy (formerly John Bunyan Upper School) is a mixed secondary school and sixth form located in the Kingsbrook area of Bedford, Bedfordshire, England.

The school mainly attracts pupils from the Kingsbrook, Cauldwell and Newnham areas of Bedford, as well as the village of Elstow.

== History ==
John Bunyan Upper School was created in the early 1970s after Bedfordshire County Council decided to implement the three-tier education system of lower, middle and upper schools across the county (as recommended in the 1967 Plowden Report). In the early 2000s, John Bunyan Upper School became a specialist Maths and Computing College.

In June 2008 Bedfordshire County Council announced that it would explore the possibilities of John Bunyan Upper School becoming an Academy, sponsored by the Harpur Trust and Bedford College. In July the Department for Children, Schools and Families confirmed that it had awarded feasibility funding to develop plans for the school to transform into an Academy by September 2010. In addition Bedford Borough Council and the University of Bedfordshire backed the plan.

In March 2009, Bedfordshire County Council confirmed that John Bunyan Upper School would close on 31 August 2010. The school would reopen the next day as Bedford Academy. In April 2009, Bedfordshire County Council was abolished, and the new education authority (Bedford Borough Council) confirmed its support for the planned academy in June 2009.

However, in October 2009, The Harpur Trust and Bedford College issued a statement indicating that plans for the new academy would have to be re-examined if it is not to educate pupils from the age of 11. The sponsors stated that the academy would work best as part of a two-tier education system in the local area, which would end the need for middle schools.

In January 2010, the Department for Children, Schools and Families formally approved plans for the new academy. A principal and vice-principal were appointed to manage the new school, and initial building works were begun.

Bedford Academy formally opened in September 2010, and specialises in Science and Technology. The school has been completely rebuilt, and was occupied in September 2012. More than £27 million in funding was secured for the rebuild.

Bedford Borough Council later backed a move to two-tier education in the district, and Bedford Academy began educating children from the age of 11 from September 2014.

== Bedford Academy Today ==
The school claims to be specialised in Science and Technology and operates a 30-hour week for pupils, with lessons lasting an hour long, with a 20 minute break and 30 minute lunch. School begins at 8:20am and ends at 3:10pm. However, a range of before and after school activities that are offered means that the academy is open from 7:30am until 5:35pm.

Courses of study offered at the school include GCSEs, BTEC First Diplomas and vocational courses. In the schools sixth form courses of study include A Levels and BTEC Extended Diplomas. The day for sixth form is different, with an extended day to 4:10pm when they have a lesson occurring in this time.

The school offers an exclusive Sixth Form Basketball Academy from Bedford Thunder Basketball Academy, where students are taught basketball alongside other academic subjects all within the BA facility, similarly to some American Colleges. Bedford Thunders is also directly linked to Bedford Academy since the Basketball Academy's logo features the BA school badge's hoop-shaped coloured rings.

The school is part of the Heart Academies Trust, a non-profit charitable company.
