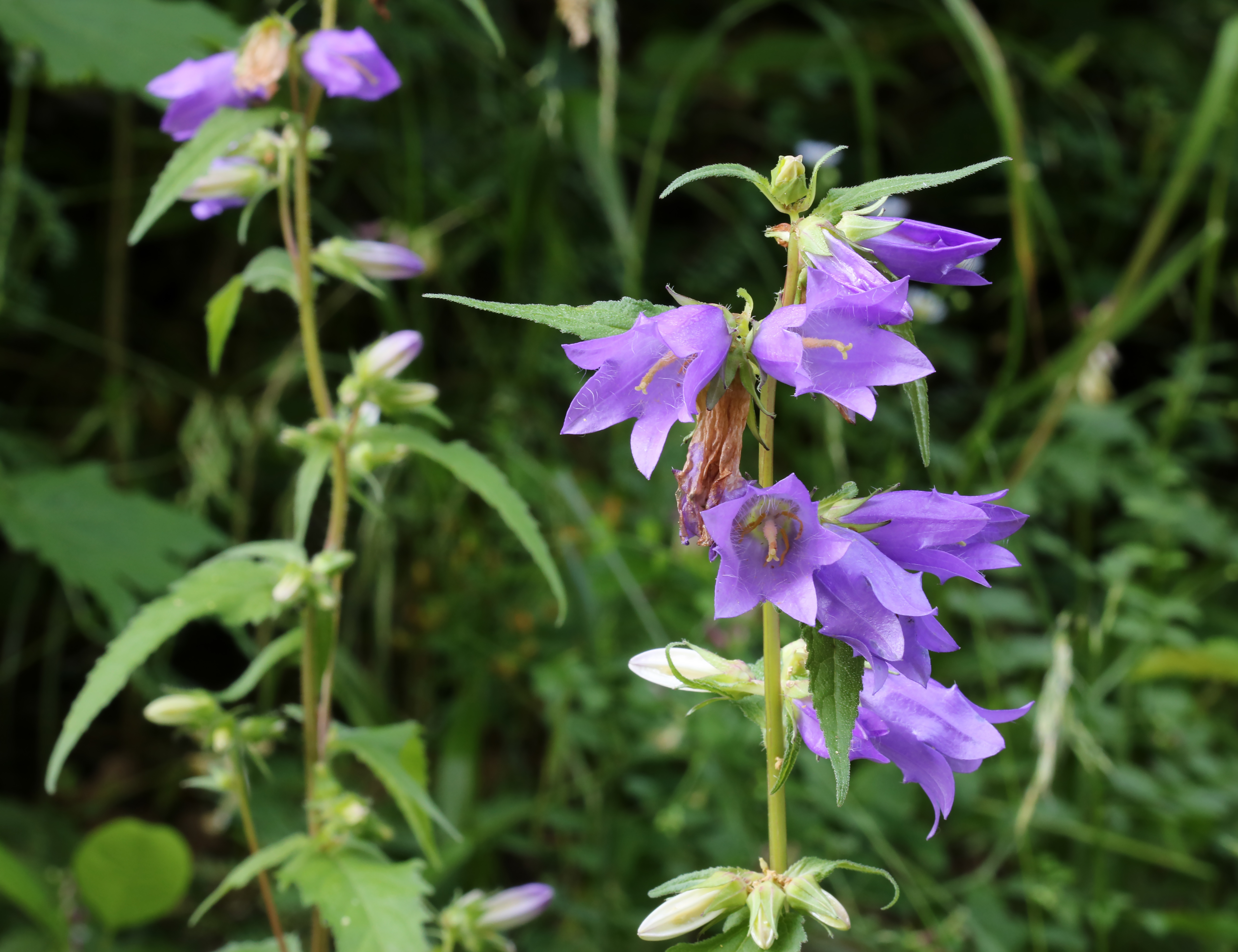

Scientific classification
- Kingdom: Plantae
- Clade: Embryophytes
- Clade: Tracheophytes
- Clade: Angiosperms
- Clade: Eudicots
- Clade: Asterids
- Order: Asterales
- Family: Campanulaceae
- Genus: Campanula
- Species: C. trachelium

Binomial name
- Campanula trachelium L.

= Campanula trachelium =

Species of flowering plant

Campanula trachelium, the nettle-leaved bellflower, is a species of bellflower. It is native to Eurasia and parts of northwestern Africa and the Middle East.

== Common names ==
The alternate name throatwort is derived from an old belief that C. trachelium is a cure for sore throat, and the species name trachelium refers to its use as treatment of the throat in folk medicine.

Other folknames include Our Lady's Bells because the color blue was identified with the Virgin Mary's scarf, veil, or shawl; Coventry Bells because C. trachelium was especially common in fields around Coventry; and "Bats-in-the-Belfry" or in the singular "Bat-in-the-Belfry", because the stamens inside the flower were like bats hanging in the bell of a church steeple.

== Description ==
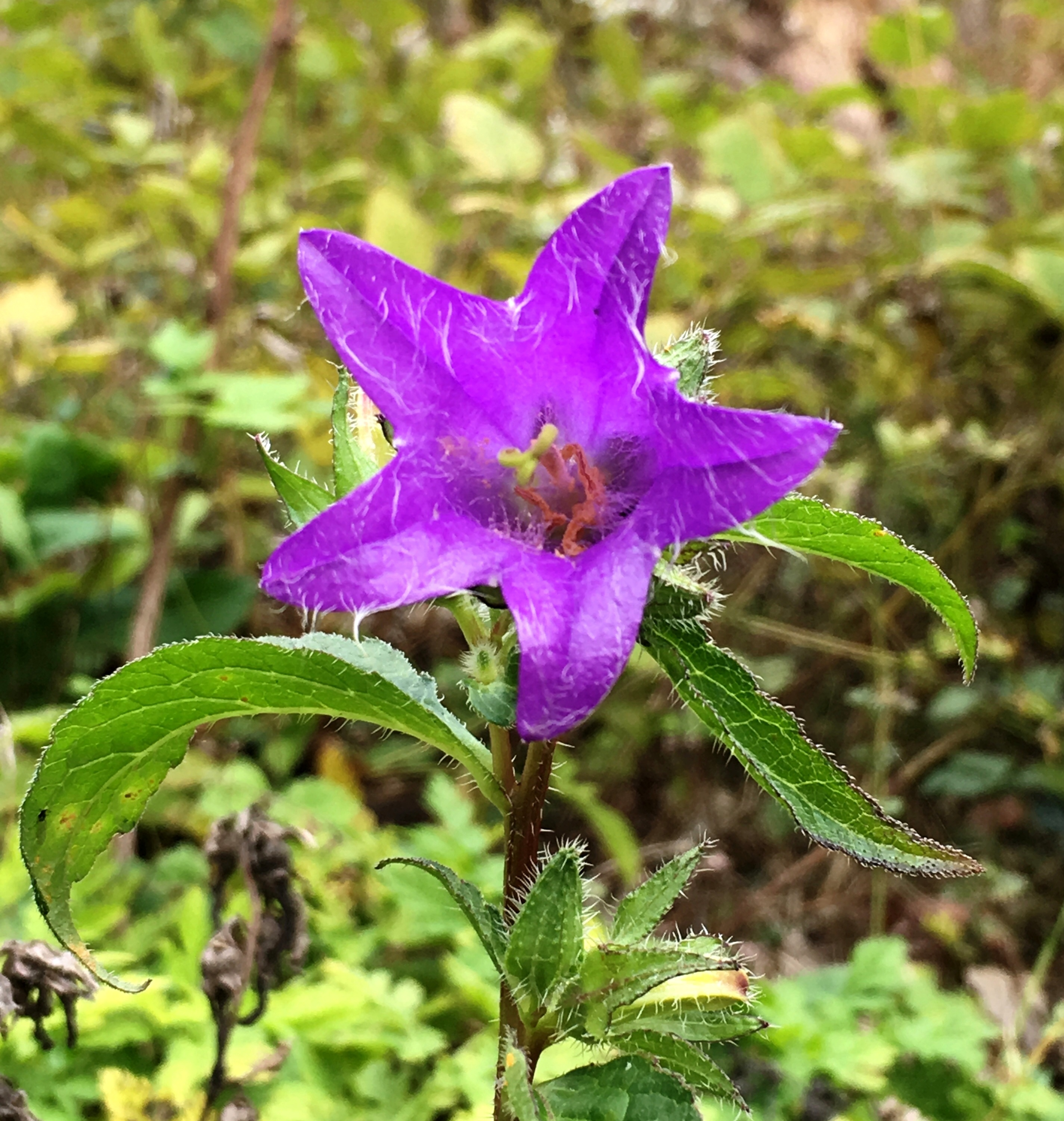
Close-up showing the fine hairs on the leaves and petals of C. trachelium on the GR 5 by the river Doubs

Campanula trachelium is a perennial plant with one or more unbranched, often reddish, square-edged stems that are roughly hairy. The leaves grow alternately up the stems. The lower leaves are long-stalked and ovate with a heart-shaped base. The upper leaves have no stalks and are ovate or lanceolate, hairy with toothed margins. The inflorescence is a one sided spike with a few slightly nodding flowers. Each flower has five sepals which are fused, erect and hairy, and the five violet (or occasionally white) petals are fused into a bell that is hairy inside. There are five stamens and a pistil formed from three fused carpels. The fruit is a hairy, nodding capsule.

== Habitat ==
Campanula trachelium likes humus-rich soil and is found in broad-leaved woodlands, coppices, hedgerows and the margins of forests.
