= Castle Newnham School =

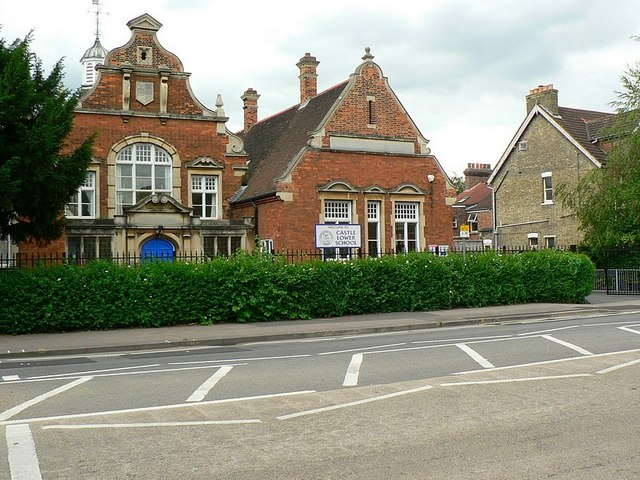
- Lower school site

Location
- Goldington Road/Polhill Avenue; Bedford, Bedfordshire; England
- Coordinates: 52°08′46″N 0°27′08″E

Information
- Type: Foundation school
- Local authority: Bedford
- Department for Education URN: 109661 Tables
- Ofsted: Reports
- Federation Principal: Ruth Wilkes
- Primary Headteacher: J Balmbra
- Gender: Coeducational
- Age: 3 to 16
- Enrolment: 684 as of January 2023
- Website: http://castlenewnham.school/

Castle Newnham School is a coeducational all-through school located over two sites in Bedford, Bedfordshire, England.

The school was formed in January 2016 from the merger of Castle Lower School on Goldington Road and Newnham Middle School on Polhill Avenue. The new school has also expanded its age range up to 16. In addition, Hazeldene Lower School on Stancliffe Road has formed a soft federation with Castle Newnham School, with graduating pupils from Hazeldene Lower School expected to attend Castle Newnham School. It used to be Newnham Middle School which was made in the 1960s.

Today, Castle Newnham is a foundation school administered by Bedford Borough Council and the Newnham Castle Hazeldene Federation. The school offers GCSEs as programmes of study for pupils.
