= Bedford Greenacre Independent School =

Coordinates: 52.144°N 0.482°W

- Bedford, Bedfordshire; England

Information
- Type: Private school
- Department for Education URN: 109717 Tables
- Principal: Ian Daniel
- Gender: Co-educational
- Age: 3 to 18
- Website: https://bedfordgreenacre.co.uk/

Bedford Greenacre Independent School is a co-educational private day school located in Bedford, Bedfordshire, England.

The school was formally created in May 2021 from a merger of Rushmoor School and St Andrew's School.

== History ==
=== Rushmoor School ===
Rushmoor School was founded in the early 1910s and was originally a privately run school based in London. It educated children of the ages of 8–13. In 1918, the school moved from London to a site on Shakespeare Road in Bedford. In 1965, the owner announced her retirement and the closure of the school, however, a group of parents and friends persuaded her to allow them to take over the running of the school and thus, the school became 'Rushmoor School Ltd', a charitable trust administered by a board of governors. The school then expanded considerably; it became partially co-educational, accepting children of the ages of 3–16.

=== St Andrew's School ===
St Andrews School was founded in 1896 as a school for the daughters of gentlemen. Located on Kimbolton Road in Bedford, before the federation and merger the school consisted of a nursery, reception class, junior school and senior school educating girls aged 3–16 and boys aged 3–9.

=== Federation and merger ===
In September 2013 Rushmoor School and St Andrew's School entered into a federation. Both schools retained their own identity and governing body, but shared resources and had one principal. In September 2016 both schools opened a combined sixth form.

In early 2014, the schools released plans to move to a combined site on the edge of Bedford. The new site utilises the current sports field for development. The plans will see girls and boys educated on the same site in a Diamond school system. In May 2021 the two schools formally merged under the new name of 'Bedford Greenacre Independent School'. The merged school relocated to the new site in January 2025. A combined nursery school will be retained on the former St Andrews School site on Kimbolton Road.
