= Bedford Girls' School =

Independent school for girls in Bedford, England

Location
- Cardington Road; Bedford, Bedfordshire, MK42 0BX; England; 52.132539249665136°N 0.46086741375874185°W

Information
- Type: Private day school
- Motto: Bold Imaginative Reflective
- Established: 2010
- Founder: Harpur Trust
- Department for Education URN: 109727 Tables
- Chair: Tina Beddoes
- Headmistress: Gemma Gibson
- Gender: Girls
- Age: 7 to 18
- Colours: Silver Grey and Lime Green
- Publication: The Muse
- Website: Official website

Bedford Girls' School (BGS) is a private school for girls, opened in September 2010, in Bedford, in the English county of Bedfordshire. The school is a result of a merger of Bedford High School and Dame Alice Harpur School, and is operated by the Harpur Trust. The school became fully operational in September 2012.

== History ==
The Harpur Trust had a long history of providing education for boys in Bedford, and in 1882 it opened two schools for girls, Bedford High School and Bedford Girls' Modern School (later renamed Dame Alice Harpur School), on the same site at Bromham Road, Bedford. While Bedford High School remained at the site, the Girls' Modern School moved to Bedford town centre by the end of the 19th century, and then in 1938 it relocated to Cardington Road, where new buildings were built on part of the playing fields the school already owned there. In 1946 it changed its name to Dame Alice Harpur School, in honour of the wife of the founder of the Harpur Trust.

In July 2009, the Harpur Trust announced its intention to merge Bedford High School and Dame Alice Harpur School, a decision arrived at because both schools had seen a fall in pupil numbers over the previous twenty years: In 1990 more than 2,000 girls had been on the rolls of the two schools, while in 2009 there were only 1,500. The trust estimated that once started, it would take three to five years to merge the schools.

In November 2009, the trust released further details of the merger. It was announced that the new merged school would be called Bedford Girls' School and would be located on the current site of Dame Alice Harpur School. It would offer the International Baccalaureate as part of its curriculum, but would not offer boarding facilities for pupils.

In December 2009, Jo MacKenzie was appointed as the first head of the Bedford Girls' School. MacKenzie assumed her post over Easter 2010. The junior department of the school opened in September 2010, when the junior schools of Bedford High and Dame Alice Harper merged on the Cardington Road site. The senior department of the school opened in September 2011, with the full merger of the old schools, including the sixth form departments completed in September 2012.

Gemma Gibson was appointed as Headmistress in 2020.

== Academic results ==
In August 2024, Bedford Girls’ School reported strong GCSE outcomes. Two-thirds of all GCSE entries were awarded grades 9–7, with one quarter receiving grade 9. All students passed all their subjects, representing a 100% pass rate.

Bedford Girls' School also reported strong Upper Sixth A Level and International Baccalaureate (IB) results. Around half of all grades were awarded A* to A, and three-quarters of students achieved A* to B grades across both A Level and IB subjects.

Bedford Girls' School was ranked 2nd among UK independent schools with a small International Baccalaureate Diploma cohort (fewer than 20 candidates) in the 2026 IB-Schools.com league table, achieving an average score of 38.6 points.

== Extracurricular activities ==
=== Sport ===
Sport plays a significant role in school life at Bedford Girls' School. Students participate in a range of sporting activities at both competitive and recreational levels, with teams competing at county, regional, and national competitions. In the 2025 School Sport Magazine Top 200 Sporting Schools rankings, Bedford Girls’ School was recognised as the 8th‑best all‑girls’ independent day school for sport in the United Kingdom.

Sports offered include:

- Athletics – Track and field events.
- Cricket
- Hockey – Teams compete in local and national tournaments.
- Lacrosse
- Netball – Teams compete at regional level.
- Rowing – Conducted through the Bedford Girls' School Rowing Club, with training on the River Great Ouse and participation in national regattas.
- Swimming
- Tennis – Both singles and doubles matches are played in school leagues and external competitions.

==== Facilities ====
The school has a number of sports facilities, including an indoor swimming pool, an all-weather sports pitch, and facilities used by the school's rowing club.

== Notable former pupils ==
- Madeleine Axford, field hockey player
- Sophie Lewis, track cyclist
- Revée Walcott-Nolan, runner
