= Fanny Eagles =

British Anglican deaconess (1836–1907)

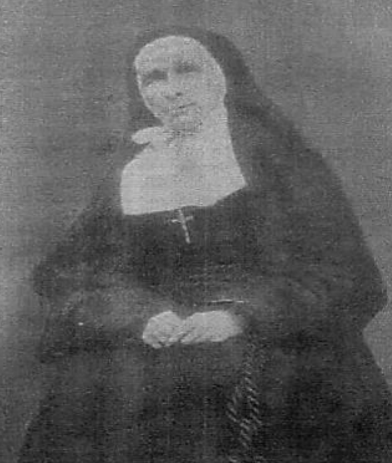

Personal life
- Born: 10 December 1836 Bedford, England
- Died: 7 March 1907 (aged 70) Bedford, England
- Occupation: deaconess

Religious life
- Religion: Anglican

Fanny Elizabeth Eagles (10 December 1836 – 7 March 1907) was a British Anglican deaconess. She led a group of deaconesses and she founded an orphanage in Bedford.

== Life ==
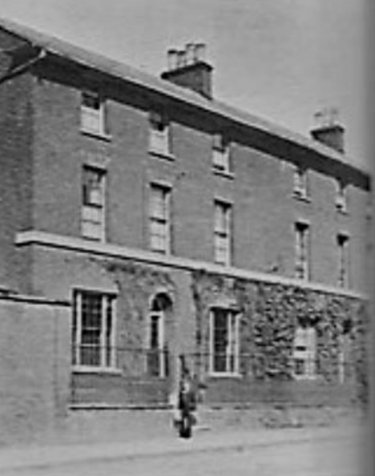
Harpur Place in Bedford

Eagles was born at Harpur Place in Bedford in 1836. Her parents were Elizabeth (born Halfhead) and Ezra Eagles. Her father was a solicitor.

She was a member of St Paul's Church in Bedford.

In 1864 the Tractarian Revd Michael Ferrebee Sadler took over from the Revd William Fitzgerald at St Paul's in Bedford. Sadler was to encourage Fanny Eagles to not be a nun, as she wanted to be, but to become a deaconess. She had readied herself for a life of caring by her work on a fever ward and two years she spent with Nursing Sisters of the Church of England in Brompton Square.

Eagles was made a deaconess by the laying on of hands on 5 February 1869. Eagles decided to wear clothes that made her look like a nun and although she was accused on being a catholic she persisted.

As a result, the Sisters of Saint Etheldreda began to be associated with the parish from 1869. When it was formed there was just her and a trainee but gradually the number of sisters grew. The emphasis initially was on education. Sunday schools and night schools were established with each deaconess taking the lead in a given area. There were at most six deaconesses at any time.

In 1870 and 1871 there was an outbreak of smallpox in Bedford and Eagles volunteered to assist. Despite the risks she helped to care for the living and the dead. As a result of her good works her community earned some respect and the gift of a house as a base from a well-wisher in Bristol. The community had been based at Eagles' house but from 1881 it has at Bromham Road.

A new role for the deaconesses in the community presented itself when Eagles began to offer a home for orphan children. From small beginnings the house in Bromham Road became an orphanage, St Etheldreda's Home. In time a chapel was built next door and a nearby house was purchased to expand the service.

== Death and legacy ==
Eagles died in at St Esmereldas in Bedford in 1907. There is a plaque on 9 Bromham Road in Bedford recording her life and the St Etheldreda’s Home for Orphans which operated there. The local museum had a gallery for famous people from Bedford and the women included suffragist Amy Walmsley, prophet and messiah Mabel Barltrop and Eagles.
