= Michael Ferrebee Sadler =

English theologian

- Born: 1819; Leeds
- Died: 15 August 1895 (aged 75–76)
- Occupation: Theologian

Michael Ferrebee Sadler (1819 – 15 August 1895) was an English theologian.

== Biography ==
Sadler was the eldest son of Michael Thomas Sadler. He was born at Leeds in 1819. Educated at Sherborne school, he entered St. John's College, Cambridge, after a short interval of business life. He was elected Tyrwhitt's Hebrew scholar in 1846, and graduated B.A. 1847. He was vicar of Bridgwater from 1857 to 1864 (during which time he was appointed to the prebend of Combe, 13th in Wells Cathedral), and of St. Paul's, Bedford, from 1864 to 1869; he was rector of Honiton from 1869 till his death. In 1869 he received an offer of the bishopric of Montreal, carrying with it the dignity of metropolitan of Canada, but refused it on medical advice. He was a voluminous writer on theological subjects, and a strong high churchman. His works, which had a large circulation, did much to popularise the tractarian doctrines. The chief of them were:

- 'The Sacrament of Responsibility,' 1851, published in the height of the Gorham controversy.
- 'The Second Adam and the New Birth,' 1857.
- 'Church Doctrine, Bible Truth,' 1862.
- 'The Church Teacher's Manual.'
- 'The Communicant's Manual.'
- 'A Commentary on the New Testament.' He died at Honiton on 15 August 1895.

He married, in 1855, Maria, daughter of John Tidd Pratt, formerly registrar of friendly societies in England.
