= Mary Roberts (author) =

English author

Mary Roberts (18 March 1788 – 13 January 1864) was an English writer who predominantly wrote about natural history and the countryside around her.

== Life ==
Roberts, born at Homerton, London, on 18 March 1788, was the daughter of Daniel Roberts, a merchant of London, and Ann, his wife. Ann Roberts was the daughter of Josiah Thompson, of Nether Compton, Dorset; her grandfather was the Quaker botanist, Thomas Lawson, and her paternal great-great-grandfather was Daniel Roberts.

Little is known about her early life, although it is known that in 1790 Mary Roberts moved with her parents to Painswick in Gloucestershire where she began writing her works on natural history.

Although born and brought up a Quaker, Mary Roberts left the society after the death of her father, when she moved with her mother to Brompton Square, London. Mary Roberts died there on 13 January 1864, and was buried in Brompton cemetery.

Some confusion has arisen between Roberts and a cousin of the same name, Mary Roberts, daughter of Samuel Roberts (1763–1848) of Sheffield, author of Royal Exile, 1822.

== Publications ==
Mary Roberts wrote fifteen books, mostly about natural history. Some passages in her Annals of my Village, Being a Calendar of Nature for Every Month in the Year (1831), fall little short of the descriptive power of Richard Jefferies. She is also considered to be the author of two pacifist tracts for the Peace Society of London, both of which were published anonymously in 1825 and 1831.

=== Natural history ===
- The Wonders of the Vegetable Kingdom Displayed in a Series of Letters (1822) (2nd ed. 1824)
- Annals of My Village, Being a Calendar of Nature for Every Month in the Year (1831)
- The Conchologist's Companion (1834)
- Sister Mary's Tales in Natural History (1834)
- The Seaside Companion, or Marine Natural History (1835)
- Wild Animals, their Nature, Habits, and Instincts, with Incidental Notices of the Regions they Inhabit (5th edit. 1836)
- Sketches of the Animal and Vegetable Productions of America (1839)
- Flowers of the Matin and Even Song; or, Thoughts for Those Who Rise Early (1845)
- Ruins and Old Trees Associated With Remarkable Events in English History (184-?)
- Voices from the Woodlands, Descriptive of Forest Trees, Ferns, Mosses, and Lichens (1850)
- A Popular History of the Mollusca; Comprising a Familiar Account of their Classification, Instincts and Habits, and of the Growth and Distinguishing Characters of Their Shells with coloured plates engraved by W. Wing (1851)

=== Other ===
- Select Female Biography; comprising memoirs of eminent British ladies, derived from original and other authentic sources (1821)
- Sequel to an Unfinished Manuscript of H. Kirke White's, to illustrate the Contrast between the Christian's and the Infidel's Close of Life (1823)
- An Examination of the Principles which are Considered to Support the Practice of War. By a Lady (1825)
- Historical Illustrations of the Origin and Consequences of War (1831)
- Domesticated Animals considered with reference to Civilisation and the Arts (1833)
- The Progress of Creation considered with reference to the Present Condition of the Earth, early, in prose and poetry'’ (1845)

=== Edited ===
Mary Roberts also edited the following;

- An Account of Anne Jackson, with particulars concerning the Plague and Fire in London written by herself Anne Jackson (1832) (as Mary de Gleva)
- The Present of a Mistress to a Young Servant, by Ann Taylor (1851)
