= St Mary's Church, Bridgwater =

Church in Somerset, England

St Mary's Church
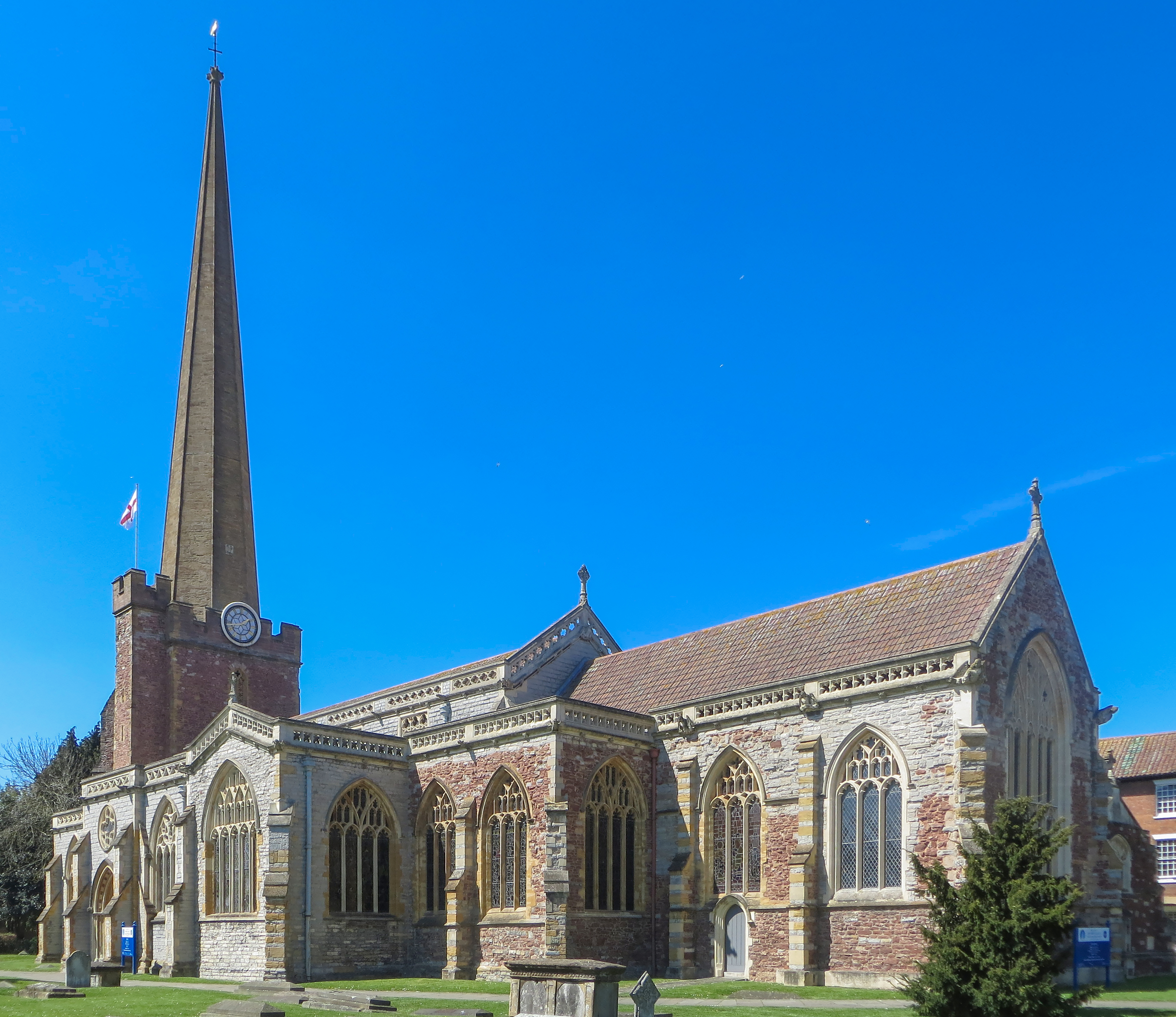
- St Mary's Church from the southeast (April 2015)

- Location in Somerset
- Location: Bridgwater, Somerset, England
- Denomination: Church of England

History
- Status: Parish church
- Founded: c. 1066
- Dedication: Mary, Mother of Jesus

Architecture
- Functional status: Active
- Heritage designation: Grade I
- Designated: 24 March 1950
- Style: Decorated Gothic, Perpendicular Gothic
- Years built: c. 1300-1430

Administration
- Province: Canterbury
- Diocese: Bath & Wells
- Archdeaconry: Taunton
- Deanery: Sedgemoor
- Benefice: Bridgwater St Mary and Chilton Trinity
- Parish: Bridgwater St. Mary

The Parish Church of St Mary, more commonly known as St Mary's, is the main Church of England parish church for the town of Bridgwater, Somerset. Originally founded well before the Norman Conquest, the present church is a large and impressive structure dating primarily from the 14th and 15th centuries, with both earlier remains and later additions.

The church is notable for its Gothic architecture, large stained glass windows, and unusually tall spire, a rarity in Somerset, a county known for its tall and elaborate church towers. With a height of 174 feet (53 m), it is the tallest medieval spire in the county. Architectural historian Nikolaus Pevsner, author of the 'Buildings of England' series, describes the spire as "exceedingly elegant".

The church is also of considerable interest for housing an exceptionally rare and unusually large painting depicting the Descent from the Cross. The artist of the painting is unknown but is generally attributed (controversially) to either the Spanish painter Murillo, or the Italian painter Carracci, both of the 17th century. The building is the town's major landmark and due to its rich architecture and treasures, has been designated a Grade I listed building, the highest possible category, by Historic England. The church is also categorised by the Church of England as a 'Major Parish Church' due to its large size and historic importance.

== History ==
=== Foundation ===
A church is recorded at the time of the Norman Conquest in 1066, however, it is not known either the location of this early structure or its history. The earliest record of a church on the present site is from 1107, when the church's revenue was granted to Bath Priory by the wife of Walter de Douai, following his death. This grant was confirmed by Walter's son, Robert of Bampton, and in 1156 by the Pope, Adrian IV.

In 1180, Walter's grandson Fulk Pagnell, who owned the manor and the land the church was built on, granted the latter to Marmoutiers Abbey, near Tours, France. The first vicar of the church is recorded a few years later, in 1187.

=== Gothic rebuilding ===
During 1203, William Brewer, who succeeded Fulk as Lord of Bridgwater, reversed his predecessor's grant to Marmoutiers, returning the church to Bath Priory in exchange for an annual payment of 100 shillings. From 1209, Brewer undertook the rebuilding of the church in the Early English Gothic style with William Briwere, architect. In 1214, Bath Priory, by this time a cathedral, gave its remaining rights to Brewer's newly founded Hospital of St John in Bridgwater, in return for a pension of £4 13s 4d, which was paid annually until the Dissolution of the Monasteries.

In the early 14th century, the church was extended westwards, aisles were added to the nave and a western tower was completed. The precise dates for the construction of the aisles and western nave are unknown, but the tower must have been completed by 1318 when a 'great' bell was installed. In 1367, construction on a spire, designed by Nicholas Whaleys, began on 28 June. The money for raising the spire came from the townspeople, from wills, and several donations, including from neighbouring villages. The construction of the spire required the addition of massive corner buttresses on the tower to support it, constructed 1383-1385. The total cost of the spire was £137 (equal to approximately £100,000 in 2017).

The end of the 14th century and the first half of the 15th century saw a large amount of rebuilding, beginning with the chancel, which was rebuilt in the Decorated Gothic style from 1395-1420. The rood screen was built in the final phase of this work, from 1414-1420. The reconstruction of the nave followed, from 1420 to 1430, incorporating some of the Early English work in the previous nave. Building work continued into the middle of the 15th century, financed by tallages, with the rebuilding or modification of the lady chapel from 1447-1448.

=== The Reformation ===
THOMAS STRETE 1528-1571 became Vicar of Saint Mary's on 11 August 1528, when the Church was still Roman Catholic. He had been Vicar for only a few years when the King, Henry VIII, proclaimed himself head of a Protestant Church of England. Thomas therefore became the first Protestant Vicar of Saint Mary's. When be became Vicar in 1528, Catholic religious customs were in full power. The Church contained several Chantries, each with its own priest; masses and anniversaries were celebrated and the Church was a blaze of colour and light, with probably as many as ten altars. Inventories survive in the Borough Archives of elaborate Communion plate and of sets of coloured vestments.

With the Reformation came many changes, but Thomas Strete obviously accepted these and remained Vicar. The Monasteries and Abbeys were abolished and Glastonbury left a ruin. The Abbot had refused to accept the King as the spiritual leader and was executed. A part of his body was in fact displayed over the East Gate at Bridgwater - a grim reminder to people such as Thomas of the consequences of disobeying the King. Henry VIII died in 1547 and was succeeded by his son Edward VI. During Edward's reign the Chantries were suppressed and all churches were ordered to use the Book of Common Prayer. After Edward's death in 1553 his Catholic half-sister Mary became Queen, but Thomas Strete survived her reign and was still Vicar when Elizabeth 1 became Queen in November 1558.Thomas remained Vicar until his death in 1571. At the time of his death St Mary's had become a Royal Living.

=== 17th, 18th and 19th centuries ===
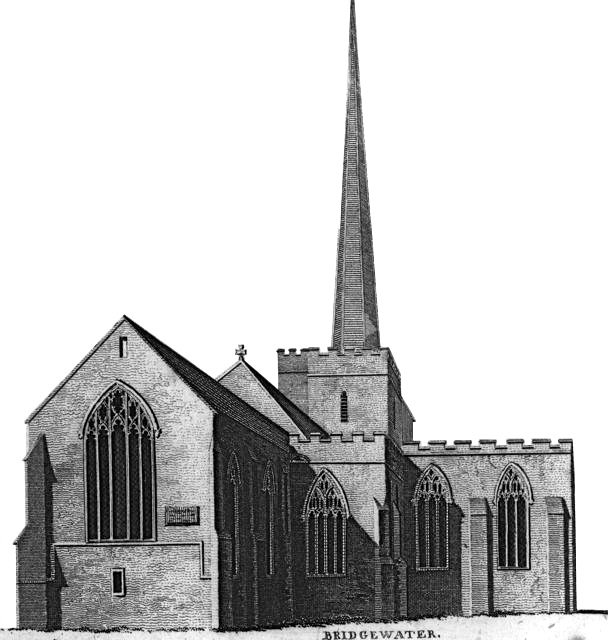
Illustration of the church in the History of Somerset, Volume 3 (1791)

The next major event in the history of the church was during the First English Civil War. On 21 July 1645, during the Siege of Bridgwater, the church was damaged when it was caught in an artillery duel between the defending Royalists, led by Edmund Wyndham, and the invading Parliamentarians, led by Thomas Fairfax. To what extent the church was damaged is unknown.

During the Monmouth Rebellion in 1685, the Duke of Monmouth, James Scott, climbed the church tower on 5 July to watch the assembly of James II's forces at Westonzoyland prior to the Battle of Sedgemoor, the final conflict of the war which would end with the Duke's execution 11 days later.

In 1814, the spire was struck by lightning during a severe thunderstorm, resulting in a deep crack developing in the structure. It was repaired "with great difficulty" the following year by Thomas Hitchings, a local builder. A series of poles were attached to the spire with ropes, followed by the fixing of a ladder so that the capstone could be reached. The capstone was too badly cracked to be fixed, so was replaced. To prevent a recurrence of the problem, a lightning conductor was fastened to the top of the spire and a long metal rod was placed inside, where it was bolted to the centre of the tower in the belfry.

From 1848 to 1857, the church was restored by William H. Brakespear (1818-1898) at a cost of £4,000-£5,000. He was a Manchester based architect, who had worked with Augustus Pugin on the restoration of the Houses of parliament, after the fire of 1834.

The nave and aisle roofs were replaced, the internal galleries removed and new pews added. The Tudor Pulpit and a section of the medieval choir stalls were retained—the latter may be seen in the Sanctuary.

The hagioscopes in the North transept was removed—These allowed a view from the North porch of the High Altar through the walls of the chapels of the Holy Cross and St Catheryn. The tower and the spire were restored and the parapet was rebuilt. Additionally, an octagonal vestry, noted to be designed like a cathedral chapter house in miniature, was added in 1854 to the north choir aisle, and the medieval rood screen was split in two, with one half each going behind the north and south choir stalls.

A further restoration took place in 1878 at the cost of £2,000. The old gas brackets were removed, the blue lias stone floor replaced with tiling, the pews of the central nave shortened to accommodate a widening of the aisles, the stained glass overhauled, the restoration of the roof bosses in the chancel and the tower arch was unblocked. The stonework was cleaned, scraped, and restored by Bradfield & Sons; the church reopened on 29 July after six months of closure.

=== 20th century ===
In 1902, the unique but ultimately undersized octagonal vestry was demolished. Beginning in 1903, and finishing in 1954, multiple stained glass windows were created as memorials, beginning with the Halson Memorial Window in the north transept. Windows were added in 1903, 1909, 1911, 1921, 1924, and 1954.

=== St George's Chapel ===
In 1920, a new chapel was created in the Sealy Chapel to commemorate the dead of the First World War, and was dedicated to Saint George. It was consecrated on 11 November 1920 by the then Bishop of Bath and Wells, George Kennion. The reredos was carved by Mr Taylorson of London, and the general carving and fitting of the altar, reredos and panels were done by Messrs Dart and Francis, Ecclesiastical woodworkers of Crediton, Devon. The figures in the middle of the reredos show Christ on the cross watched by the Virgin Mary and Saint John. The figure on the left is Saint George with the dragon. The figure on the right is Saint Louis of France with the banner of Saint Denis. The chapel has a series of panels on the east and south walls naming the war dead. A supplementary panel was added later listing the dead of World War 2, and the Korean and Falklands wars. The main Bridgwater War Memorial, is in King Square. It was unveiled by General the Earl of Cavan (then Chief of the Imperial General Staff) on 25 September 1924.

Reordering of the east end followed in 1937. The floor tiles installed in 1878 were removed and the floor was lowered. The east window was blocked to make the painting of the Descent of the Cross more prominent, and the walls were plastered. The tower and spire were also repaired as part of this work. The tower and spire would be repaired again from 1993-1994 when scaffolding was erected the full height of the structure.

=== 21st century reordering ===
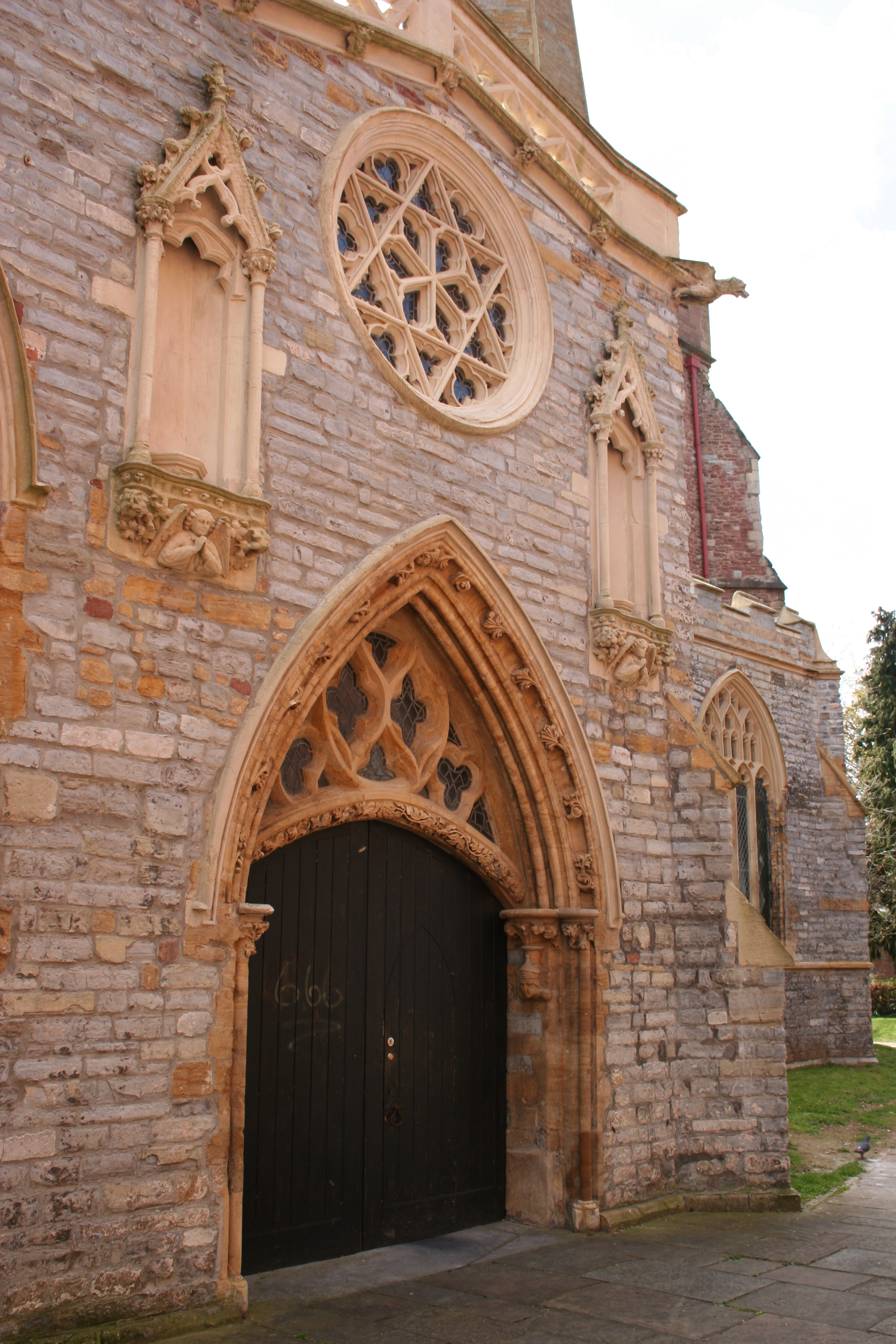
South porch

On 6 June 2016, the church closed for a £1 million restoration and reordering project. The work, which lasted thirteen months, was the most extensive in the church's history, and aimed to both modernise the space for the 21st century and to restore it, reversing many of the Victorian alterations in the 19th century. Following its closure in June, work to remove the flooring in the nave uncovered the tops of several burial chambers of varying designs, which resulted in the project cost rising by over £130,000.

A major aspect of the project was the cleaning of the nave's large hammerbeam roof, which had been covered in layers of wax, dirt, and unknown finishes. The scaffold to clean the roof was erected from August 2016. The oak roof was blast-cleaned with soda, a method normally used on smaller items of furniture but uncommon on such large areas of woodwork. The soda is a gentle abrasive that removes dirt without damaging the woodwork underneath. The cleaning of the roof was completed at the end of September, followed by the repainting of the walls, and then the removal of the internal scaffold in October.

The remaining months of 2016 and the winter of 2017 involved the laying of new underfloor heating pipes, the electrical systems, and the foundations for the new floor. Beginning in February, 800 slabs of Blue Lias stone tiles were laid across the entire floor of the church, replacements for the medieval tiles removed by the Victorians in 1878. The stone came from a quarry in Somerton. The first tiles were laid in the transepts and took until June to lay across the remainder of the floor. During this time, additional work was undertaken on the pews, which were reduced in size, restored, and mounted on movable frames to allow a more flexible use of the interior. A new kitchen was created from oak, including modern cabinets and facilities, and new lighting installed throughout the building.

The church reopened, to critical acclaim, in July 2017. The main contractors for the work were Ellis & Co, working to the designs of Mark Richmond Architects. Ellis & Co received a 'Highly Commended' in the 2018 William Stansel Awards by Somerset Building Preservation Trust.

== The Clergy ==
There have been fifty one Vicars of St Mary's since Ralph, the clerk of Bruges, c1170, plus Chantry priests to serve the chantry chapels before the Reformation, and curates since. The Vicar and Chantry priests lived in houses on the opposite side of St Mary's Street, to the South of the church. It now forms part of the Old Vicarage Restaurant.

A number gained national fame. These include John Norman (Commonwealth Minister of Bridgwater 1647-1662), Moses Williams (Vicar of Bridgwater 1732-1742), Michael Ferrebee Sadler (Vicar of Bridgwater 1857-1864) and Henry Dixon, (Vicar of Bridgwater 1920-1923)

== Education ==
A church school existed in the town in medieval times, and in 1561, following the Dissolution of the Monasteries, became the Free Grammar School. By 1819 it had no pupils, but had been overtaken by Dr Morgan’s school, founded in 1723, which in 1888 received the endowments of the Free Grammar School.

Various schools were established in the town during the seventeenth century. These included the renowned Dissenting Academy of John Moore, at Christ Church Chapel which continued into the eighteenth century. Christ Church Sunday School was founded in 1780 and there was a Wesleyan Sunday School by 1800.

Early in the nineteenth century, conflicts grew up between the Church of England and Nonconformists about how children should be educated. This resulted in the formation of two competing societies which funded the building of new schools. These were: Church of England: National Society for promoting the Education of the Poor in the Principles of the Church of England, and Nonconformist: British and Foreign School Society

Between 1824 and 1870 several schools were established in Bridgwater by the two competing Societies, and the period is littered with closures or amalgamations. In addition, many churches had Sunday schools.

The National Schools were:

Infants’ school near Angel Crescent, 1830. By 1891 amalgamated with the Girls’ National School.

Boys’ school, Mount Street, 1839. Merged with Dr Morgan’s school by 1825

Girls’ school, Northgate, 1830. Known as St Mary’s Church of England School by 1937 By 1947 assumed Voluntary Controlled status. From 1961 infants only; 1973 moved to Park Road; 1977 amalgamated with St Matthew’s School in Oakfield Road.

West Street Ragged School, 1860. By 1875 known as West Street National School. By 1947 adopted voluntary controlled status. 1958 renamed St Matthew’s C. of E. school. 1964 moved to new site in Oakfield Road and was joined by St Mary’s school in 1977.

== Architecture ==
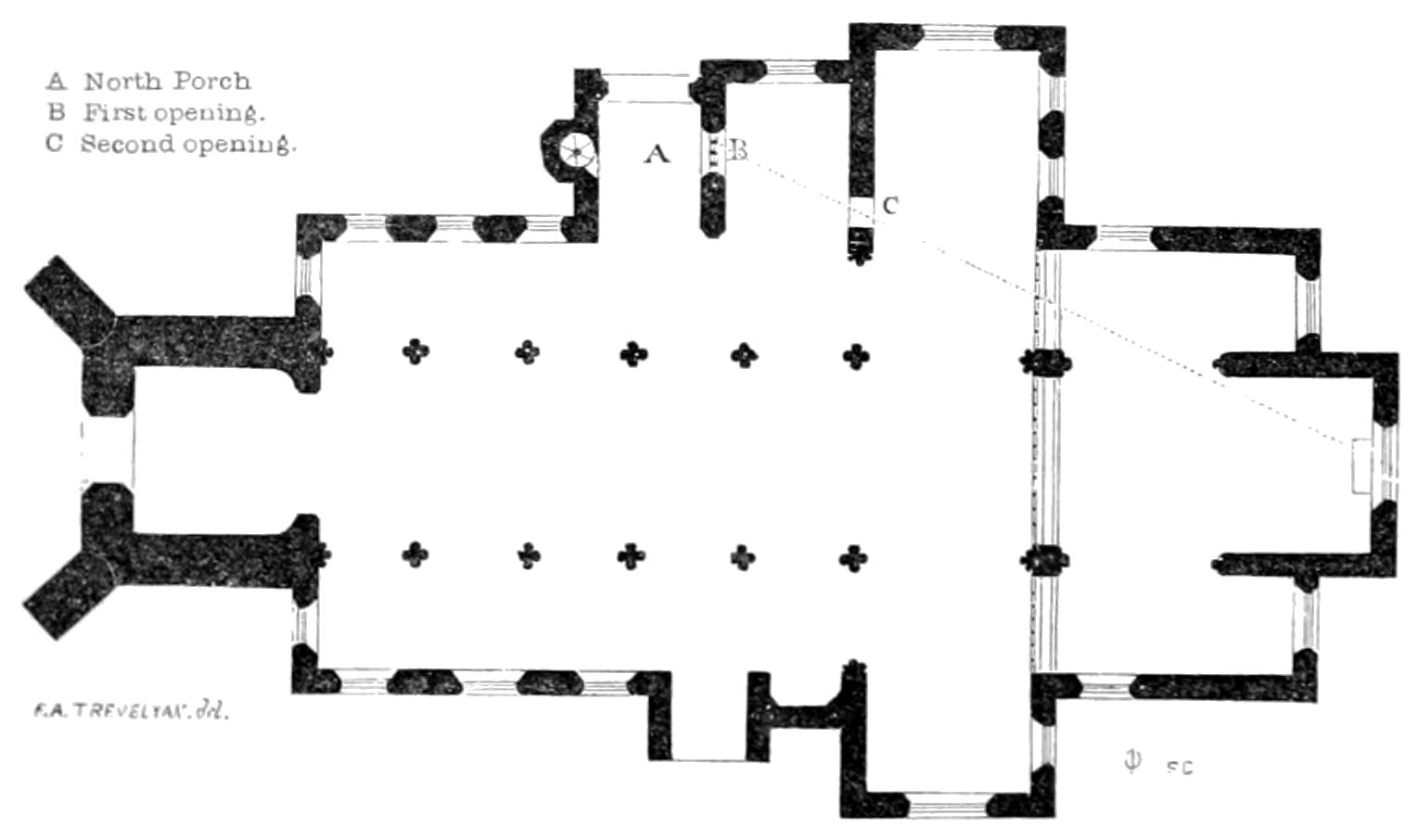
Plan of the church, from Archaeological Journal, Volume 3 (1846)

=== Plan ===
The church has a traditional but complex, cruciform plan, orientated east-west. The building consists of a sanctuary of two and a half bays, a choir of two bays with north and south chapels, an aisled nave of five bays, transepts with parallel porches, and a low west tower. North of the chancel is a vestry dated to 1902, replacing the octagonal structure constructed in 1854. According to the Church of England, the church has a floor area of 1,085 square metres (11,680 sq ft), which makes it a 'very large' sized building; the 6th-largest parish church in the county.

=== Exterior ===
The exterior is constructed from a mixture of materials, including distinctive red Wembdon sandstone rubble in the tower and chancel, blue lias limestone and Ham Hill stone. Bath stone is also used in the transepts and porches for decoration. The chief feature of the exterior is the tower and spire, which rise to a combined height of 174 feet (53 m), making it the tallest medieval spire in the county.

The tower is the earliest part of the exterior, constructed in the opening years of the 14th century when the church was extended westwards. It is built of two stages separated by a simple string course. The lowest stage on the west side has a small two-light window, with smaller windows in the north and south faces, with pierced quatrefoil stone tracery. The upper stage has two-light bell openings in the Somerset style, with pierced stone tracery. The tower is capped by a simple castellated parapet made of Ham Hill stone. The tower is 60 feet (18 m) high. On the south side of the tower is a large, castellated, square stair turret, rising the full height of the tower, with six slit windows and Ham Hill stone dressings. Above the tower rises a slender spire some 114 feet (35 m) tall, octagonal in plan. Unlike other notable spires in South West England like St Mary Redcliffe and Salisbury Cathedral, the spire has almost no external decoration.

The nave has both aisles and clerestory, featuring windows with pointed arches and hoodmoulds. The nave is lit by a series of large Perpendicular transomed windows. The north and south transepts, with their accompanying porches, feature large oculus windows with tracery in the star pattern, made from Bath stone. The north transept has a late 19th century window with elaborate reticulated tracery; its door is flanked by green men. The chancel, like the tower, is constructed from Wembdon sandstone, which gives it a distinctive red hue, and has a large five-light east window, divided by transoms and mullions.

=== Interior ===
The interior has a polychromatic Victorian tiled and modern blue lias stone floor, dating from 1878 and 2017 respectively. The chancel has a 15th century panelled barrel vaulted ceiling with moulded braces. Every fourth brace is richly decorated, resting on angels with outstretched wings. The chancel ceiling has 70 carved bosses dating from 1385-1416 with some additions in the Victorian era, depicting a wide range of topics including flora such as ferns, Christian symbols such as the Star of David, and mythical creatures like unicorns. The bosses were cleaned and restored from 2016-2017 to remove layers of residue. The chancel window is blocked by a great altarpiece, comprising a rare 17th century painting.

The nave also has a notable roof of the hammerbeam type dating to the 19th century, resting on painted angel corbels. Like the chancel roof, this was cleaned in 2016-2017. The nave, formed of six bays, is separated from the aisles by an arcade formed of hollow-section columns with small circular capitals. East of the nave are the massive crossing arches, which sit on polygonal piers.

The interior is unusual for balconies in the transepts, formed by the upper stories of the north and south porches which do not project externally, but internally instead. The north balcony has wide semicircular arches with a central mullion, flanked by cinquefoil-headed arches. The south balcony has one cusped ogee arch facing the nave and one facing the transepts. Both balconies have pierced stone balustrades.

==== Stained glass ====
Much, if not all, of the church's original stained glass was destroyed in the Reformation and subsequent Civil War damage. Following the restoration undertaken by Brakespear, numerous windows had their clear glass replaced with stained glass. One of the first windows to be replaced was the round oculus in the gable of the south porch, which Brakespear contracted to Alfred Beer of Exeter. At a later, unknown, date, this window was replaced with clear glass once more; no record of the design of the stained glass window survives.

The following year, in 1852, a much larger window in the Corporation Chapel was also contracted to Alfred Beer, with the cost donated by the then Mayor of Bridgwater, Thomas Ford. This window, which still survives today, contains the oldest stained glass that still survives in the church. The window depicts the symbols of the Crucifixion, and includes other emblems like the arms of the town.

The next windows would not be added until 1876, being two windows in the St George's Chapel. These windows were created and dedicated to the memory of John Sealy, his wife Emma, and their children John and Edmund. Both of these windows were designed and created by the well-known London firm of stained glass makers, Clayton & Bell. Three more windows would be installed in 1880 and three further windows by the end of the 19th century. An additional six stained glass windows were installed between 1903 and 1954, which brings the total number of stained glass windows in the church to fifteen.

== Fittings ==
=== Altarpiece ===
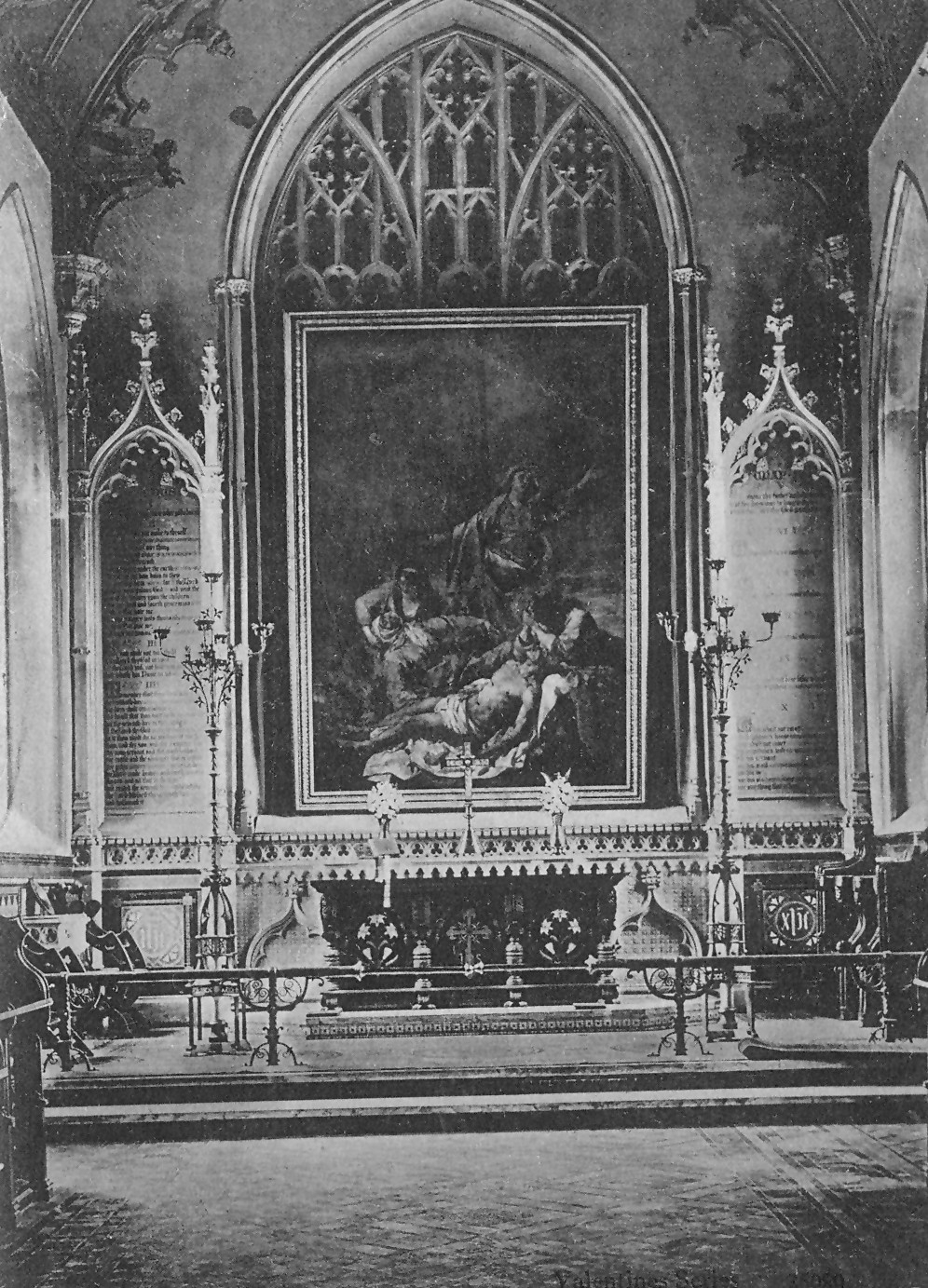
Altarpiece in 1860

The main treasure of the church is its extremely rare and uncommonly large altarpiece; a 17th century painting depicting the Descent from the Cross. The painting was given to the church in 1780 by Lord Anne Poulet, who acquired it when the ship that carried it docked at Plymouth. Poulet gave the painting to the church; its history and painter are the subject of much debate.

The Somerset edition of The King's England (1936), describes it as a 17th century French painting, but without mentioning an artist. The Victoria County History for Somerset ascribes it to an unknown Bolognese artist instead; the Somerset Archaeological Society (1896) attribute it to the Italian artist Annibale Carracci of Bologna; and further 19th and 20th century sources give its painter as Murillo instead, owing to the similar brushstrokes and style in works known to be his.

The painting depicts the Descent from the Cross, the 13th Station of the Cross. The painting shows Jesus at the foot of the cross, with Saint John bending over him, next to Mary Magdalene and the Virgin Mary, the latter of whom has fainted. Restored in 1930, the painting is large enough to block the east window, being some 8 feet (2.4 m) wide and 13 feet (4.0 m) tall.

=== Woodwork ===
==== Rood screen ====
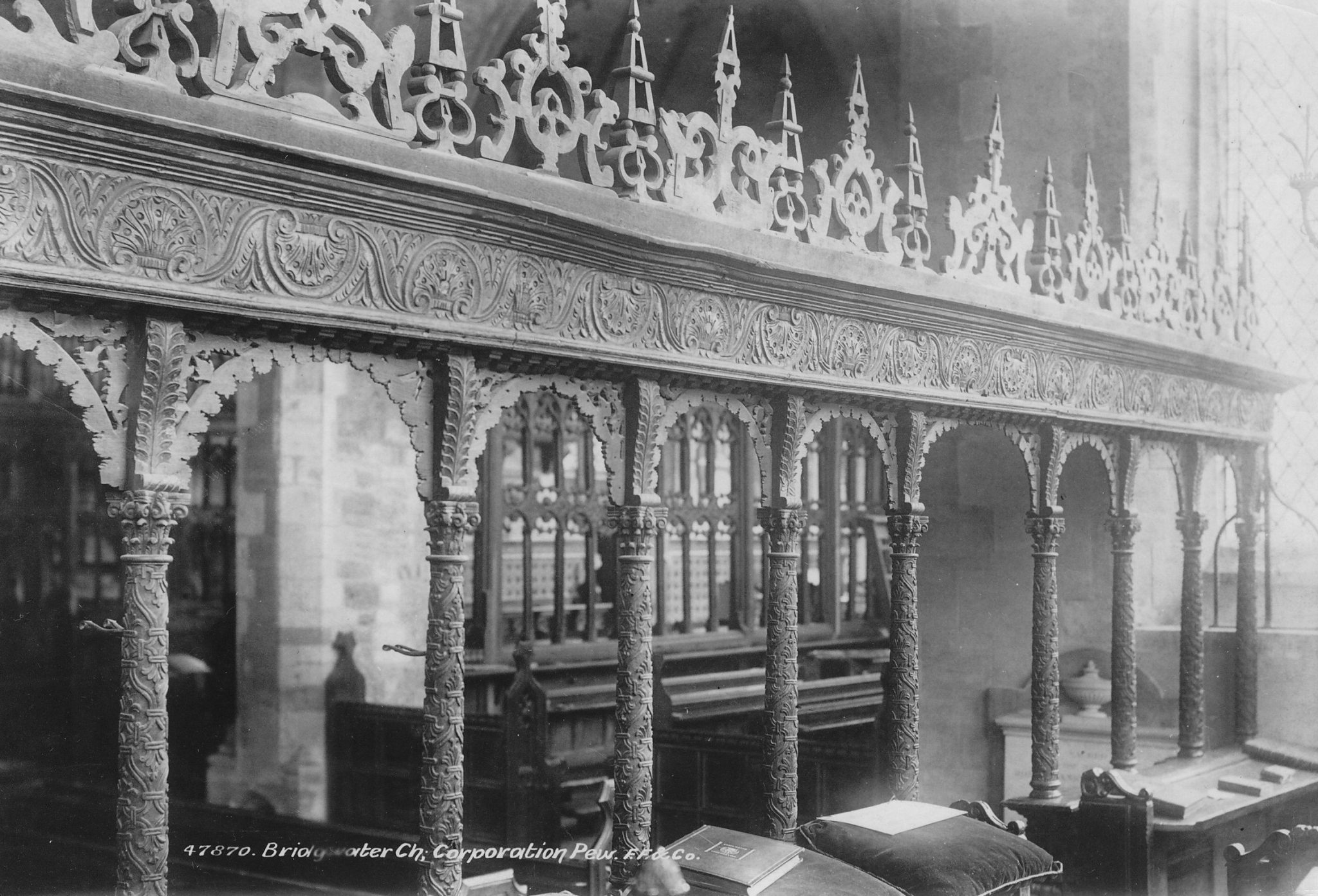
The Corporation Screen in 1901

The nave as built was supplied with a carved medieval rood screen separating it from the chancel; later, the organ was placed above it. In the restoration of 1848-1857, the medieval rood screen was removed from its position separating the nave and chancel, cut into two, and one-half of each placed behind the choir stalls, where they remain to this day. Each screen has five monograms, representing the initials of ten unknown people linked to the church in some way.

In the Jacobean era, the main screen was supplemented with an additional screen, to the West, designed and installed as part of the post-Reformation reordering of the church, and known as the 'Corporation Screen'. In 1849, the Corporation Screen was turned and fronted pews to divide the rest of the church from the so-called Corporation Chapel, in the South Transept, where the councillors of the town would sit during services. Due to spare material being left over from the1849 work, in the 1930s, four of the pillars of the screen were repurposed as the supports for a table in the Church of St Peter and St John in Northmoor Green, a few miles southwest of Bridgwater. Each pillar is highly decorative, with a total of seventeen carved heads across the screen, facing the Nave and a fretted frieze running along the top. The accompanying photograph of the screen shows it from the reverse.

==== Credence table ====
One of the lesser-known treasures of the church is a rare 14th century desk, with Decorated Gothic carvings. Octagonal in plan, the eight sides have carved tracery, forming a cage-like structure. Removed in the 19th century to Wemdon Road Cemetery Chapel, it was returned to the church in 1930 and made into a credence table. Its original purpose prior to removal is unknown, possibly forming the base of a lectern, or being hung from the roof.

=== Burials, memorials and monuments ===
In the south aisle of the nave lie two, unidentified, Early English grave slabs. Now sited in Victorian tomb recesses, these originally sat in medieval tomb recesses, now occupied by modern radiators. The first of the slabs is 32.5 inches (83 cm) long, and the other 46 inches (120 cm) long. Both have a Greek cross etched on their top faces.

Other notable monuments include a large marble and Watchet alabaster monument to Sir Francis Kingsmill, dating to 1620-1621; a royal coat of arms from 1712; and a partially defaced Masonic memorial on the northwestern tower buttress. The latter, designed in the Regency style, is most likely 19th century in age.

== Music ==
=== Organ ===
==== Early organs ====
The earliest record of an organ at the church is from 1448, when a document now stored at the Bridgwater Borough Archives shows that the churchwardens paid 18s 3d for two 'bellows' for the organ. The organ at this time was probably similar in size to a modern-day upright piano, with only one keyboard and a single row of pipes. This early organ seems to have lasted for several centuries, for in the early 1600s, Ralph Chappinton of Netherbury, Dorset, repaired it; there is no record of this repair being a replacement instrument, so it can be assumed this was the original organ.

This organ was replaced in 1700 when a new instrument, of an unknown size and maker, opened on 17 July, located in an organ loft above the rood screen. Repaired in 1810, it remained above the rood screen until 1823, when it was decided to move it. Dismantled early that year, it was reconstructed on a large new gallery that was being built in front of the tower arch. £102 was paid to repair the organ, and a further £37 to move it to the new western gallery.

==== 19th century ====
As part of the restoration in the 19th century, it was decided to substantially enlarge and repair the organ. The organ was rebuilt with a new soundboard and wind chest, the pipes were reseated and the whole instrument re-voiced to concert pitch. The organ was also enlarged, with seven new stops, one and a half octaves of pedals, and new bellows. The rebuilt instrument was opened on 22 July 1849 at a special service in the church, which was noted to be 'overcrowded'. Despite the costly rebuild and new additions, during the building work on the church, the organ was exposed to dust and the weather, which resulted in it failing in 1852, requiring it to be dismantled and sent to Bath for repairs.

Despite the repairs in Bath, the organ soon became unplayable, the pipes collapsing under their own weight. A meeting was called in October 1868 to decide what to do, and it was voted by the parishioners to contact the renowned organ builder, 'Father' Henry Wills, for a quote. At the next meeting, the quote came back from Wills for £550, including him taking the old organ as a part exchange. By November 1869, the organ had not been ordered, and due to the increase in the price of materials, the quote was increased to £600. The old organ was finally taken down in April 1871 and the new instrument was opened on 21 September of that year.

===== The choir =====
The Victorian restoration followed the goals of the Oxford Movement, with the aim of repeating the liturgical forms of the past. A male choir was formed of sixty men and boys, and the repertoire followed that of Cathedrals, with polyphonic singing in the choir stalls. Before this few parish churches had robed choirs, and instead congregations sang Metrical Psalms—a relic of Puritan times, and later Anglican church music began to allow hymns, through the influence of John Wesley and his brothers There is no evidence there had been a town choir and band singing in the West Gallery before this. It must be presumed that the church made much use of Hymns Ancient and Modern first published very soon after the church re-opened.

==== 20th century ====
The organ was rebuilt in 1922 by Vowles of Bristol, who modernised it by adding pneumatic action and a new blowing plant. Only sixteen years later, Willis & Sons returned to service the instrument, who re-voiced the reeds and added a new pedalboard. The organ was repaired, restored and overhauled a further three times before the end of the century.

The organ was rebuilt in 1965 by Percy Daniels & Co of Clevedon, who as far as possible kept the tone of the instrument to how it was when Wills installed it, but added six further stops, and by means of extensions, parts of the instrument were enlarged. The work was finished in March 1966. Two more overhauls took place in the late 20th century, one each in 1975 and 1979, and some of the pipes were repainted in the 1980s. The organ was covered during the restoration from 2016-2017, to prevent dust from breaching the pipework.

=== Bells ===
==== Early bells ====
It is not known when the tower first contained bells, but there were five bells in the tower by the mid-16th century. The smallest bell (treble) was recast in 1615 by George and William (II) Purdue and is both the oldest surviving bell in the tower and the only surviving bell in the British Isles cast by these two founders together. The bells were augmented to a ring of six in 1640 by the casting of a new bell by Robert Austen I of Compton Dundon. The third and fourth bells were recast in 1721 by Abraham Rudhall II of Gloucester and then augmented to eight with two new bells cast by Bridgwater founder Thomas Bayley in 1745.

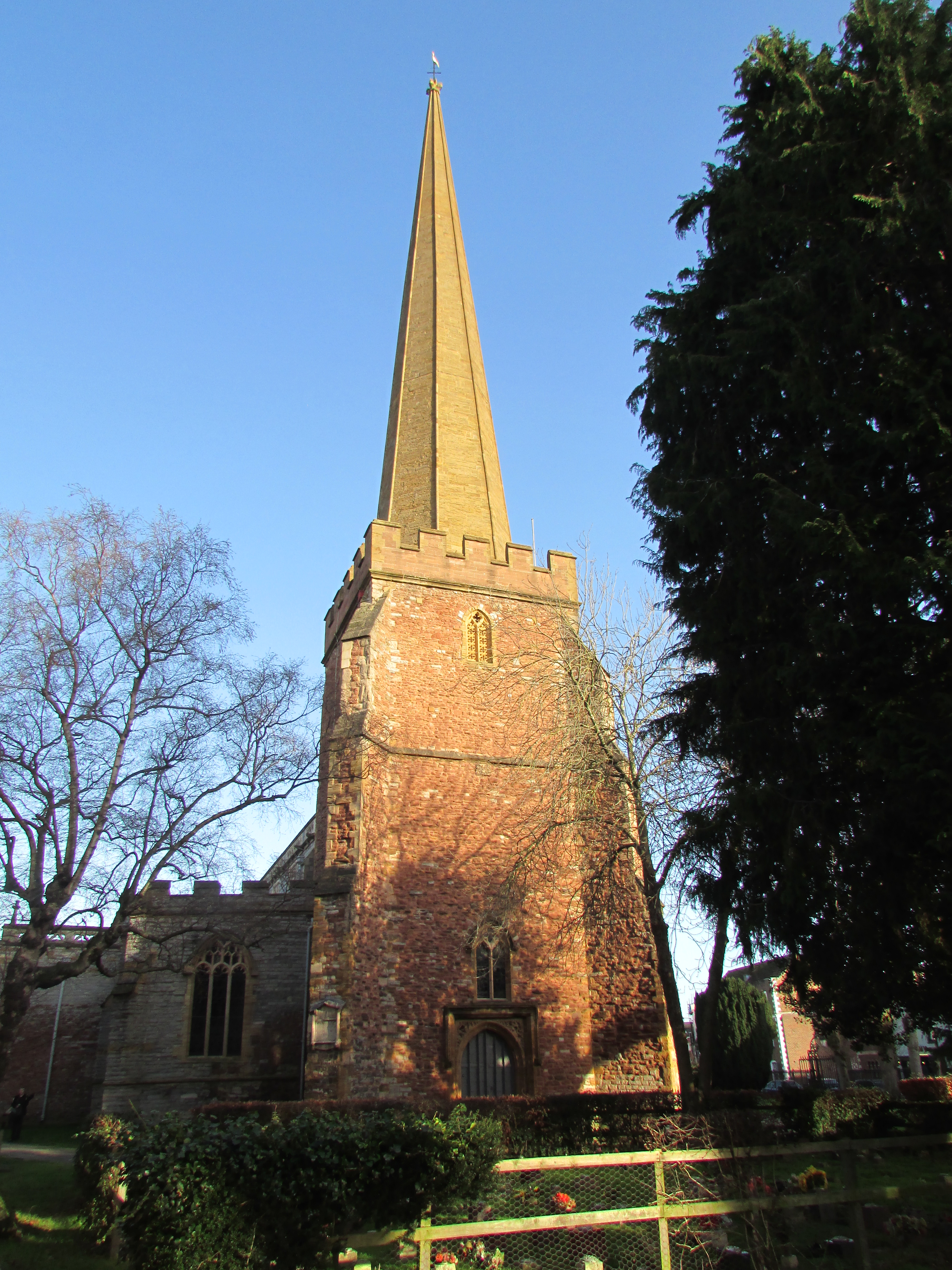
The tower and spire. The bells hang in the uppermost portion of the tower, below the spire

==== 19th century ====
The bells were essentially as Bayley left them in 1745 until 1868, when John Taylor & Co of Loughborough recast the tenor (largest bell), which then weighed 28 long cwt (3,136 pounds (1,422 kg)). The bells were rehung in 1879 by a local contractor at a cost of £80, but this cannot have been satisfactory, for only twenty years later, the bells required restoration again. In 1899, Taylor's returned and transported all eight bells and their fittings to their foundry in Freehold Street in Loughborough.

The treble and fifth bells were recast and the remaining bells retuned. The act of retuning, in addition to the removal of the tenor's canons (decorative loops of metal on the head of the bell), reduced its weight to 25 long cwt 1 qtr 11 lb (2,839 lb or 1,288 kg). The bells were rehung with all new fittings including cast iron headstocks and plain bearings, into a new metal frame.

==== Modern developments ====
At the time of their 1899 rehanging, bell-hanging companies in the United Kingdom used plain bearings, which required regular oiling to keep them running. By 1979, these plain bearings were worn and the bells were not easy to ring, so they were rehung by Taylor's on ball bearings. The following year, a floor was inserted below the west window in the tower, and the ringing chamber moved to sit above it; the bells had been rung from the ground floor up to this time.

In 2012, the bells were inspected by the four major bell-hanging firms in the country, who reported on their condition and the possibility of augmenting the bells to a ring of ten. The appeal was launched in 2015, and subsequently altered to include the augmentation of the bells to a ring of twelve. The fundraising goal was £195,000, and by 2017, £86,000 had been raised or given via grant bodies.

Work commenced in October 2019 thanks to a substantial grant from the Heritage Lottery Fund, with the casting of two of the four new bells required. In December, all the existing bells, their fittings and the framework they hang in, were removed from the tower over a period of two weeks and sent to Loughborough. The other two new bells were cast in December, also, and an additional new semitone bell was ordered to make a total of thirteen. The thirteenth bell, called a flat sixth, sits between the sixth and seventh bell in the ring, and allows more combinations of bells to be rung, and was cast in March 2020.

In the foundry, the existing 1899 cast iron frame was reorganised and extended on a new grillage to allow for the hanging of the five extra bells. The fittings from 1899 were refurbished and reused, with the new bells all being provided with replica fittings to match. The metal frame for the bells returned to the church on 11 June 2020 and was installed in the tower, ready to receive the augmented bells, which returned two weeks later, on 25 June. Taking one month to install, the bells were first rung on 24 July, but owing to the coronavirus restrictions in the United Kingdom, only four ringers were permitted to be in the tower.

It would not be until 17 August 2021 that restrictions had eased sufficiently to allow the full complement of twelve bells to be rung for the first time. The bells were formally rededicated at a special service by the Right Reverend Ruth Worsley, Bishop of Taunton, on 12 June 2022. The first full peal on the new ring of twelve, comprising 5,037 changes of Grandsire Cinques, was rung by staff and supporters from John Taylor & Co on 4 March 2023, taking 3 hours and 22 minutes to complete.

The present ring of bells thus comprises a diatonic ring of twelve plus an extra semitone bell (flat sixth), made up of eight Taylor bells from 1868, 1899, 2019 and 2020, two bells by the Rudhall foundry in Gloucester from 1721, and one bell each by Thomas Bayley in 1745, Robert Austen in 1640, and George and William Purdue in 1615. Following the augmentation work, the tenor bell now weighs 25 long cwt 1 qtr 1 lb (2,829 lb or 1,283 kg).

== See also ==
- Grade I listed buildings in Sedgemoor
- List of Somerset towers
- List of ecclesiastical parishes in the Diocese of Bath and Wells
