= William Simmonds Chatterley =

English actor (1787–1822)

William Simmonds Chatterley (21 March 1787 – 1822) was an English actor.

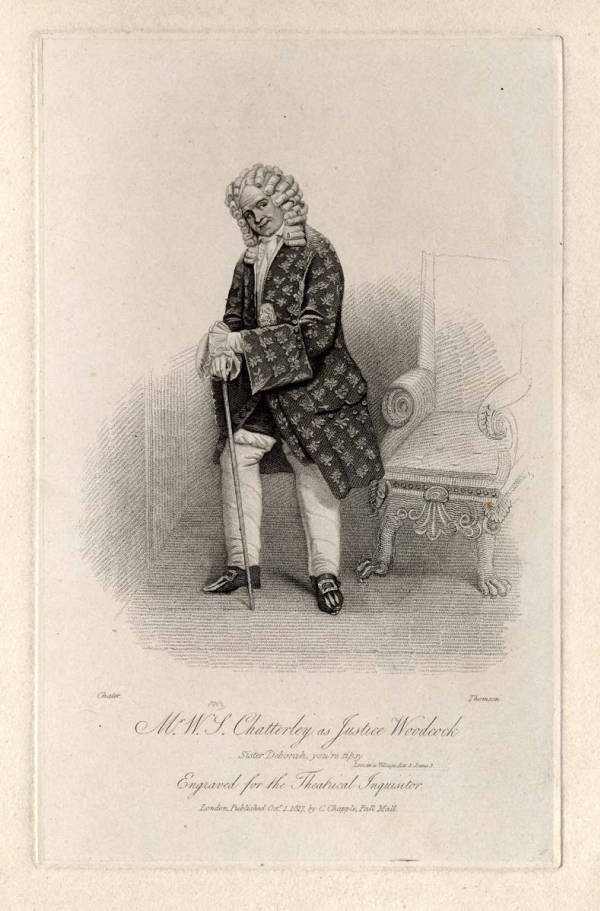
Chatterley as Justice Woodcock in "Love in a Village"

His father, originally a surgical instrument maker in Cannon Street filled subsequently a post in connection with Drury Lane Theatre, at which house Chatterley made his appearance in infantine parts. He is said to have played in his third year the King of the Fairies in the 'Jubilee,' and Cupid in 'Arthur and Emmeline,' a piece which records show to have been played at Drury Lane on 5 November 1789. When, in 1791, the Drury Lane company migrated to the King's Theatre (Opera House) in the Haymarket, Chatterley accompanied it, but played no character sufficiently important to have his name mentioned.

On 1 February 1795, after the return of the company, he was first publicly heard of playing Carlos in an ill-starred tragedy by Bertie Greatheed, entitled The Regent. On 24 September 1796 he played the Child in 'Isabella,' a version by Garrick of Southerne's 'Fatal Marriage,' to the Isabella of Mrs. Siddons. Through the recommendation of Bannister he assumed youthful characters in Birmingham, and took part in private theatricals. His connection with Drury Lane was maintained until 1804, when he accepted a country engagement. At Cheltenham he made a success in what is technically called leading business.

Palmer and Dimond secured him in 1810 for the Bath theatre, of which they were managers. Here he married, on 11 August 1813, Miss Louisa Simeon, an actress, who was known as Louisa Chatterley and whose reputation remained at least on a level with his own. He reappeared in 1816 in London at the Lyceum. Irregularity of life interfered with his success, and after accepting temporary engagements at the Adelphi, the Olympic, the Surrey, and other theatres, he died at Lynn in Norfolk in 1822, a victim of most forms of excess, particularity alcohol abuse.

In Bath, he played such characters as Sir Anthony Absolute, Launcelot Gobbo, Foresight in 'Love for Love,' Sir Solomon Sadlips in The Double Gallant. In London, his great character was Justice Woodcock, in which he came only behind Munden and Dowton. He 'created,' on 24 May 1799, the rôle of the boy in Pizarro by Richard Brinsley Sheridan. Mrs. Chatterley, who was an agreeable actress in comedy, had the reputation of being the best representative of a Frenchwoman on the English stage.
