= Francis Place Collection =

British Library collection

The Francis Place Collection is an important British Library collection of press cuttings, leaflets, and ephemera about British politics and economics between 1770 and 1853 with some earlier material. The collection was created by the social reformer Francis Place (1771–1854). In 1844, Place suffered a stroke, and possibly a brain tumour, which left him with difficulty reading and writing. It was about this time that he began to organise his collection into guard-books as he was unable to be as active in political circles as he had been previously. The original paper collection is in 180 volumes which can be viewed at the main St Pancras site of the British Library and is also available to the public on Microfilm.

== Scope ==
The collection reflects the political and social issues important to Place, including:

- The Corn Laws
- Chartism
- Emigration
- Free Trade
- The Sanitary Laws
- King George IV and Queen Caroline
- The Luddite Movement
- Working conditions
- The Irish Famine
- Strikes
- Sedition

It includes important newspapers such as:

- The Anti-Corn Law Circular (Manchester 1839-1841)
- The Anti-Bread-Tax Circular (Manchester 1841-1843)
- Newspapers from 1770 to 1837, including illegal unstamped papers

It also includes the complete published materials and minutes of the London Corresponding Society.

== See also ==
- Francis Place
