= Rose Emma Drummond =

British portrait miniaturist (d. 1840)

- Born: c. 1790
- Died: 1840; Mexico City, Mexico
- Known for: Portrait miniatures of theatre actresses and writers
- Elected: Royal Academy of the Arts

Rose Emma Drummond (c. 1790–1840) was a British portrait miniaturist who is known for her works of theatre actresses. She was active between 1815 and 1837. She was also the inspiration for Miss La Creevy in the Charles Dickens novel Nicholas Nickleby.

== Early life ==
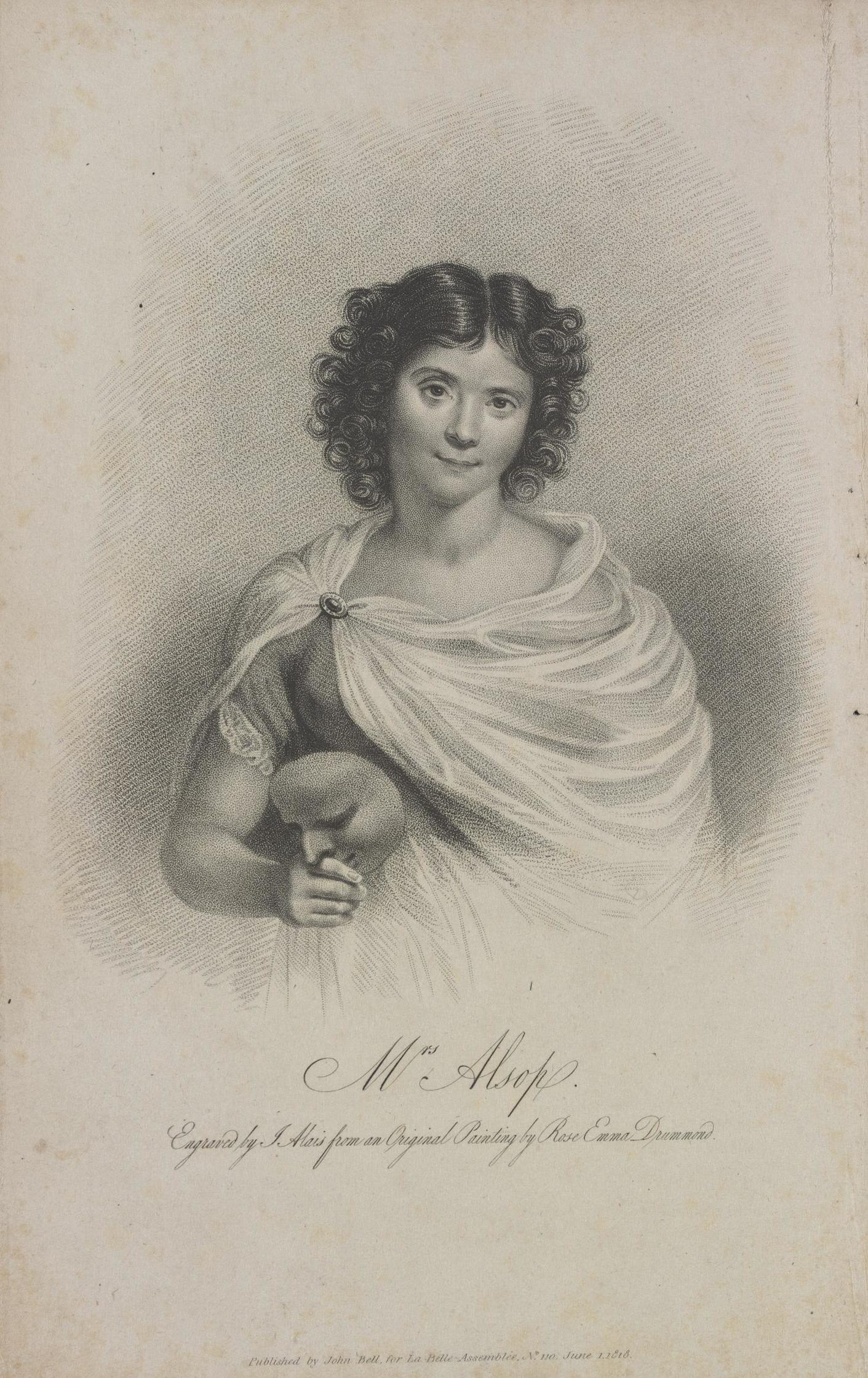
Engraving of Frances Allsop, after an original painting by Drummond, held in the collection of the Victoria and Albert Museum in London

Drummond's parents were the artist Samuel Drummond and his first wife. Her half-sisters Ellen Drummond, Eliza Ann Drummond, Jane Drummond and Rosa Myra Drummond and her half brothers Julian Drummond and Philip Maurice Drummond, from her father's second and third marriages, all also became artists.

== Career ==
Drummond is most known for her portrait miniature work and painting theatre actresses, with her famous sitters including Elizabeth Walker Blanchard, Louisa Chatterley, Clara Fisher, Elizabeth Inchbald, Henrietta Mangeon, Jane Pope, Harriet Smithson, Mary Tighe, Ellen Tree, Emma Wensley and Anne Wignell. Her sitters were sometimes dressed as their characters. She also painted Hannah Thatcher, who was "a young lady born deaf and dumb who was presented to Her late Majesty on acquiring the faculty of speech, and the sense of hearing".

Drummond was an Associate of the Royal Academy of Arts and exhibited there throughout her career. Drummond also exhibited at the New Water-Colour Society between 1831 and 1835.

Drummond is also considered the inspiration for the character Miss La Creevy, the middle-aged miniature painter in the 1838 novel Nicholas Nickleby by Charles Dickens. In 1835 she had painted his likeness on ivory as an engagement present from him to Catherine Hogarth, with "Painted by Rose Emma Drummond, 8 Soho Square, 9th July 1835" engraved on the back. Drummond was portrayed by Nora Nicholson in the 1970 BBC 2 film The Great Inimitable Mr Dickens.

== Late life and death ==
Drummond emigrated to Mexico in the late 1830s to live with her younger brother Samuel Drummond. She died in Mexico City in 1840.
