= Pizarro (play) =

1799 play by Richard Brinsley Sheridan

- Original language: English
- Written by: Richard Brinsley Sheridan
- Genre: Tragedy
- Setting: Peru, Sixteenth century

Premiere
- Date: 24 May 1799
- Place: Theatre Royal, Drury Lane, London

Pizarro is a 1799 historical tragedy by Richard Brinsley Sheridan. It was inspired by August von Kotzebue's play Die Spanier in Peru, based on the Spanish conquest of the Inca Empire in 1532 by Francisco Pizarro. It premiered at the Theatre Royal, Drury Lane in London on 24 May 1799.

== Cast and crew ==
The cast included John Philip Kemble as Rolla, William Barrymore as Pizarro, Sarah Siddons as Elvira, Dorothea Jordan as Cora, Charles Kemble as Alonzo, John Powell as Ataliba, Thomas Caulfield as Almagro, Robert Palmer as Valverde, James Aickin as Las Casas, Richard Suett as Diego, William Dowton as Grozembo, William Chatterley as Boy and Charles Holland as Centinel. The music was composed by Michael Kelly. The epilogue was written by William Lamb, the future Prime Minister of the United Kingdom.

== Reception ==
The play was a popular success, running for 31 consecutive nights and being revived on a number of occasions. Sheridan's version was produced during the war with France, at a time when an invasion was feared.

== Gallery ==
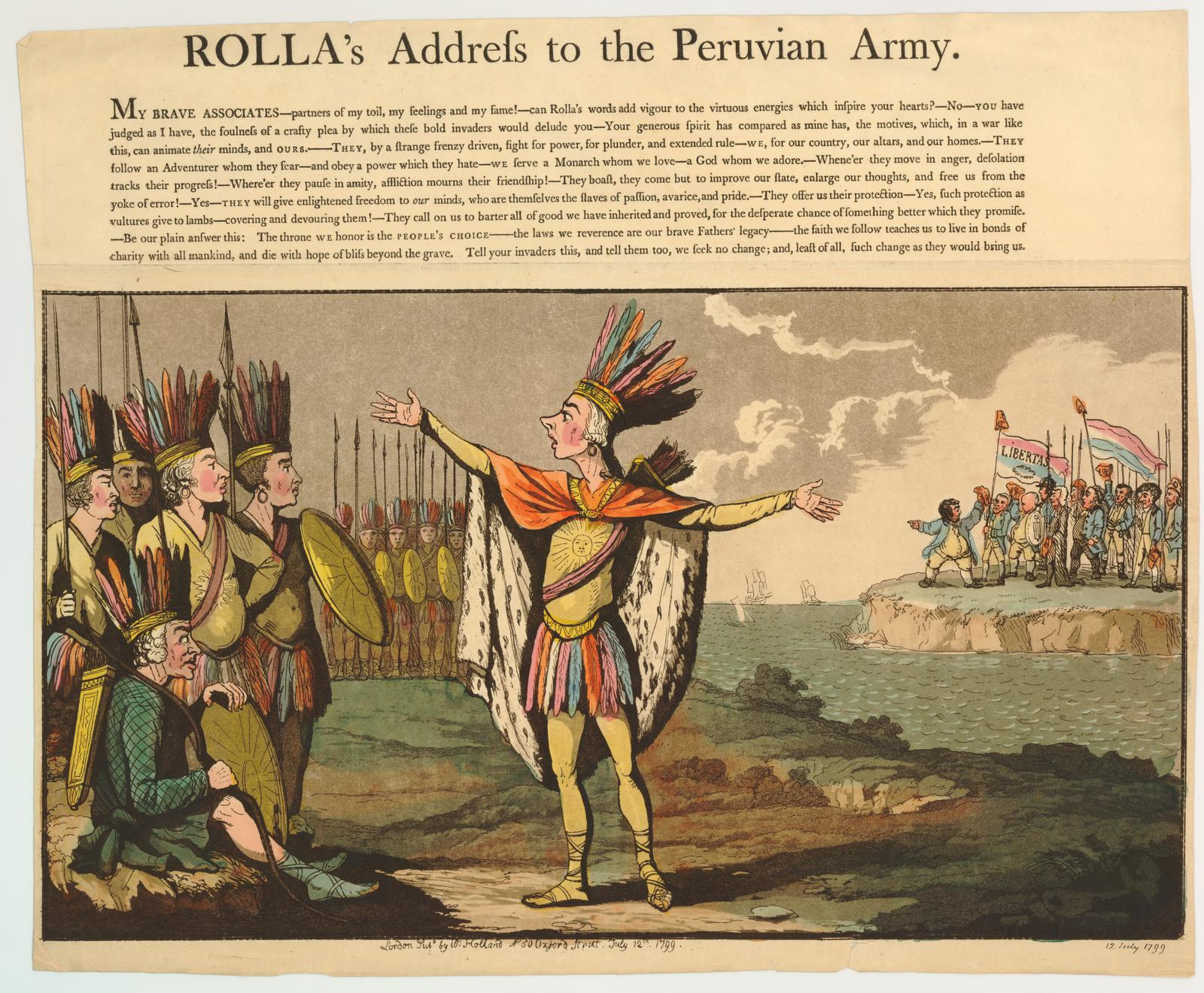
Satirical print inspired by the play featuring a caricature of William Pitt as Rolla.

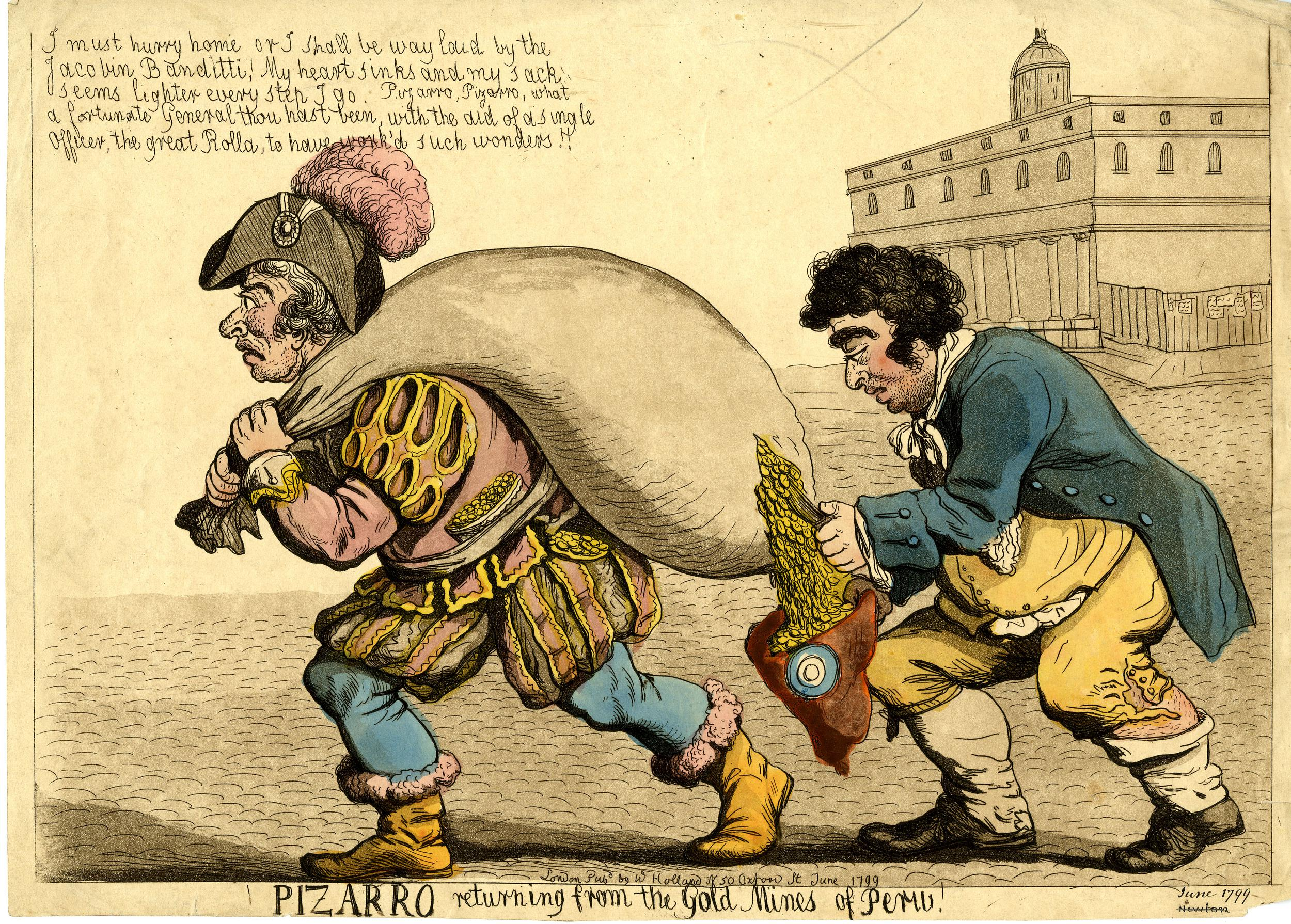
Another print featuring Sheridan as Pizarro and also depicting his political ally Charles James Fox

John Philip Kemble as Rolla by Thomas Lawrence, 1800

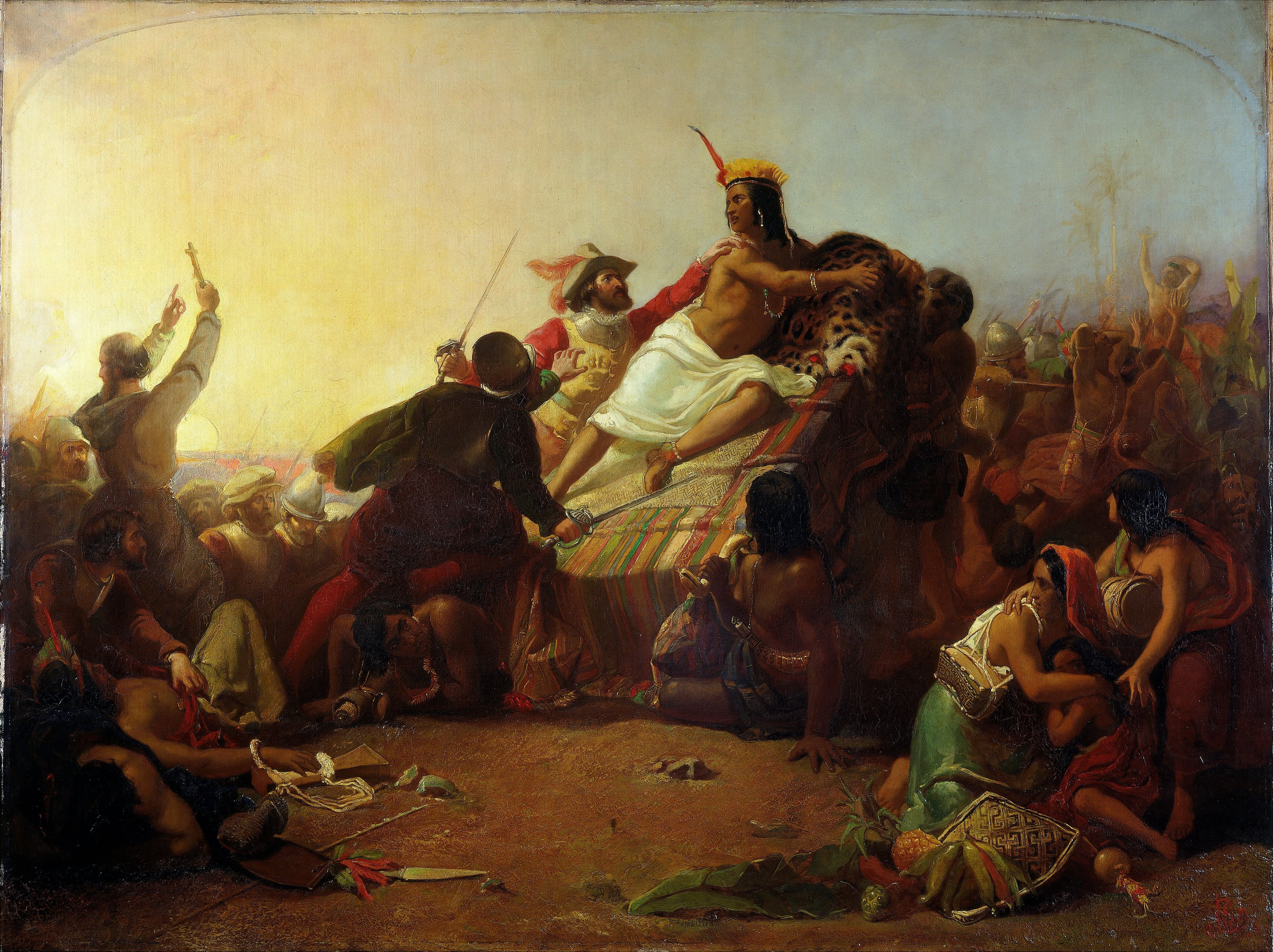
Pizarro Seizing the Inca of Peru by John Everett Millais, 1846. The painting was inspired by Sheridan's play.

== Bibliography ==
- Gross, Jonathan David (ed.) Byron's "Corbeau Blanc": The Life and Letters of Lady Melbourne. Texas A&M University Press, 1998.
- Kelly, Linda. Richard Brinsley Sheridan: A Life. Faber & Faber, 2012.
- Morwood, James & Crane, David. Sheridan Studies. Cambridge University Press, 1995.
