= Francis Place =

English social reformer (1771–1854)

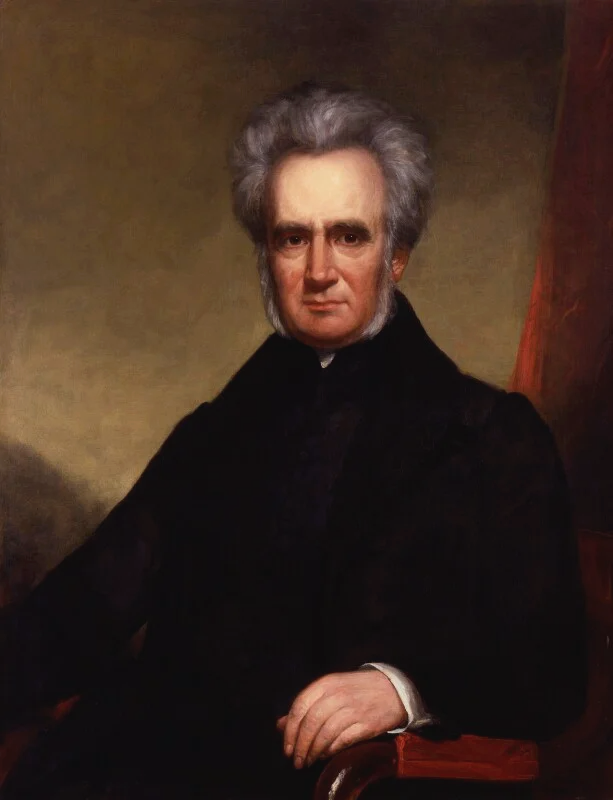
- 1833 portrait
- Born: 3 November 1771; London, England
- Died: 1 January 1854 (aged 82); London, England
- Spouse(s): Elizabeth Chad (m. 1791; died 1827) Louisa Chatterley (m. 1830; sep. 1851)
- Children: 15

Francis Place (3 November 1771, London – 1 January 1854, London) was an English social reformer described as "a ubiquitous figure in the machinery of radical London."

== Background and early life ==
He was an illegitimate son of Simon Place and Mary Gray. His father was originally a journeyman baker. He then became a Marshalsea Court officer, and ran a sponging-house in Vinegar Yard, off Brydges Street, opposite the south side of the Theatre Royal, Drury Lane. Francis Place was born there on 3 November 1771, and baptised at St Martin-in-the-Fields, on 1 December 1771. His older sister, Hannah, had been born there on 17 April 1770. Shortly the family moved to a house in Ship and Anchor Court, near Temple Bar, London. His younger brother George was born there in August 1773, and then a younger sister Ann, in June 1775.

In June 1780, Simon Place became a publican and moved his family to the Kings Arms, in Arundel Street, off the Strand.

=== Marital status of Simon Place ===
In Place's autobiography, he stated that his mother's maiden surname was Gray but he did not know where his parents had met, or when they married. His mother said that she had married Simon at age 25, which Place presumed was in 1755 or 1756.

Around 1785, Simon Place was involved in a suit in the ecclesiastical court of St Clement Danes parish: a woman named Anna Place had come to the Overseers and claimed parish aid, as the wife of Simon Place of Arundel Street. She had a daughter named Mary, who was by then the wife of Henry Kitchin of Clerkenwell. The Parish Officers advised Simon to make a weekly allowance for her, but Simon refused, saying that Anna was not his wife. Anna claimed that she was the wife of Simon from a Fleet marriage which had occurred around 40 years earlier to this. The case lasted for some years, and was lost by Simon, with heavy costs. It established that Simon Place (surname as "Plaise" in the register) had married Anna Peters at Fleet Prison, on 29 October 1747. This was only four days after Mary Place, daughter of Simon, was baptised at St Anne's Church, Soho.

== Career as tailor ==
Francis Place was schooled in London until 1785, on his own account mostly in the three Rs. At the end of his school time he was head boy in the school of Mr Bovis. On 20 June 1785, he was apprenticed to Joseph France, a leather-breeches maker in Temple Bar. At 18, Place was an independent journeyman. His apprenticeship with France was terminated early, an outcome attributed to a quarrel with Simon Place.

In 1799 Place became the partner with Richard Wild in a tailor's shop at 29 Charing Cross. A year later he set up his own successful tailoring business at 16 Charing Cross. He retired as a tailor in 1817, still drawing an income from his shop which was carried on by his children.

== Activist ==
In 1793 Place became involved in and eventually the leader of a strike of leather-breeches makers, and was refused work for several years by London's master tailors; he exploited this time by reading. He went on to participate widely in the next four decades of reform activity, often consulted by other reformers. He had as rival William Cobbett, according to G. D. H. Cole "quite as much of an egotist as Place himself". Edward Pearce wrote:

The point so rarely grasped is how difficult it was to be Paine, Cobbett, Place, Hunt, Carlile and Attwood.

Place dropped out of political activities at times. He withdrew into family life for six years from 1799 while he established his own business. His experiences in 1814 saw him pull back. In 1817 he stayed for a visit of several months with Jeremy Bentham and James Mill at Forde Abbey. But he was absent from the radical agitation of 1816 to 1818. He worked in the early 1820s as a mentor to Joseph Hume, closely and effectively but not without some friction.

=== London Corresponding Society ===
In 1794, Place joined the London Corresponding Society (LCS), a reform club. He was introduced by the shoemaker John Ashley (c. 1762–1829), a friend, who had taken over from Thomas Hardy as the society's secretary. Hardy had been arrested in connection with the 1794 Treason Trials, and the radical reformers had been infiltrated by spies. Place came in as an organiser, and for several years was prominent in the LCS. Among the LCS members was the gunmaker Richard Fenton, who became a friend. It was Fenton who introduced Place to his business partner Richard Wild.

Place resigned his post as chairman of the general committee in 1797. He left the LCS as one of a Godwinite group who wished to proceed by publication and discussion of reformist ideas, rather than political agitation. Arrests in 1798, however, of LCS members Thomas Evans and Alexander Galloway saw Place organise subscriptions of support for Janet Evans, sister of Galloway and married to Evans. John Fenwick (died 1823), a journalist and "literary mentor" to Place, was another LCS member, husband of Eliza Fenwick and an associate of Godwin and Thomas Holcroft.

=== Radical contacts ===
Place established a library of reform literature at 16 Charing Cross, and it became a meeting place for radicals. He came into contact with James Mill. Through Mill, he met Jeremy Bentham in 1812. With Bentham, Place contacted Thomas Hodgskin, William Thompson and John Wade. He knew also Robert Owen and John Stuart Mill.

=== Education ===
Place had some experience with the Lancasterian method of teaching. The West London Lancasterian Association, however, became an unfortunate experience for him: he and his ally John Richter were pushed off the committee by Francis Burdett in 1814, in a high-handed move with some Spenceans accusing them of being spies.

At the time of the founding of the London Mechanics' Institution in 1823, Place was involved with George Birkbeck, in fund-raising. His proposals were unpopular with the radicals Hodgskin and Joseph Clinton Robertson, who looked for greater autonomy, but were carried through.

=== Malthusian ===
In the early 1820s, Place also became a Malthusian and believed that population increase would outstrip the food supply. He advocated the use of contraception. He published Illustrations and Proofs of the Principles of Population, in 1822, engaging with the views of both Thomas Malthus and William Godwin. In 1823, with Benthamite volunteers and anonymous backers, he launched a handbill campaign, concentrating on London's Spitalfields area. He advocated forms of contraceptive sponge, as well as coitus interruptus. The effort tarnished his reputation for many years, but provoked further pioneering works in English by Richard Carlile, Robert Dale Owen and Charles Knowlton.

=== Labour law ===
Place, working with Joseph Hume, lobbied successfully for the 1824 repeal of the Combination Act 1799. The change in legislation had the effect of removing legal obstacles to strikes in much of the economy. It also meant that trade union organisation was no longer a common law criminal offence. Many strikes followed. In 1825 the common law status of trade unionism was reversed.

== Later life ==
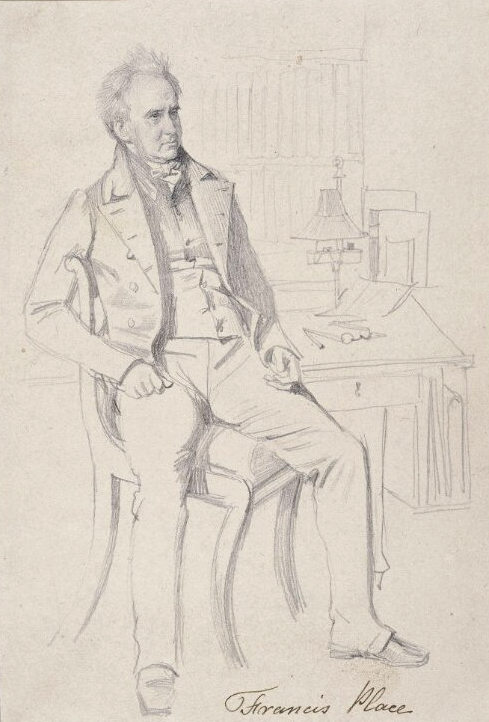
Francis Place, 1830s drawing by Daniel Maclise

In 1830, Place helped support Rowland Detrosier, a working class radical activist who also sought to distance himself from socialism. Through Place, Detrosier would be introduced to figures such as Bentham and J.S. Mill, who in turn introduced him to Thomas Carlyle. Detrosier's activities and writings would be influential amongst Manchester Radicals and the later Chartists. He was also active in the agitation that led to the Reform Act 1832, holding up the recent revolution in Paris as an example of what could happen if reform was not allowed by legal means.

Having financial troubles in 1833, Place had to move from Charing Cross to Brompton Square. He worked against the stamp tax. In the London Working Men's Association, he and William Lovett in 1838 drafted the document that became the People's Charter. Some Chartists were willing to use violent means, and when Feargus O'Connor replaced Lovett as the effective leader of the movement, Place dropped Chartist activities. He then became involved in the movement to repeal the Corn Laws. In later life he wrote his autobiography and organised the collections he had made: notes, pamphlets, newspapers and letters. He suffered a stroke in 1844, that left him partially disabled.

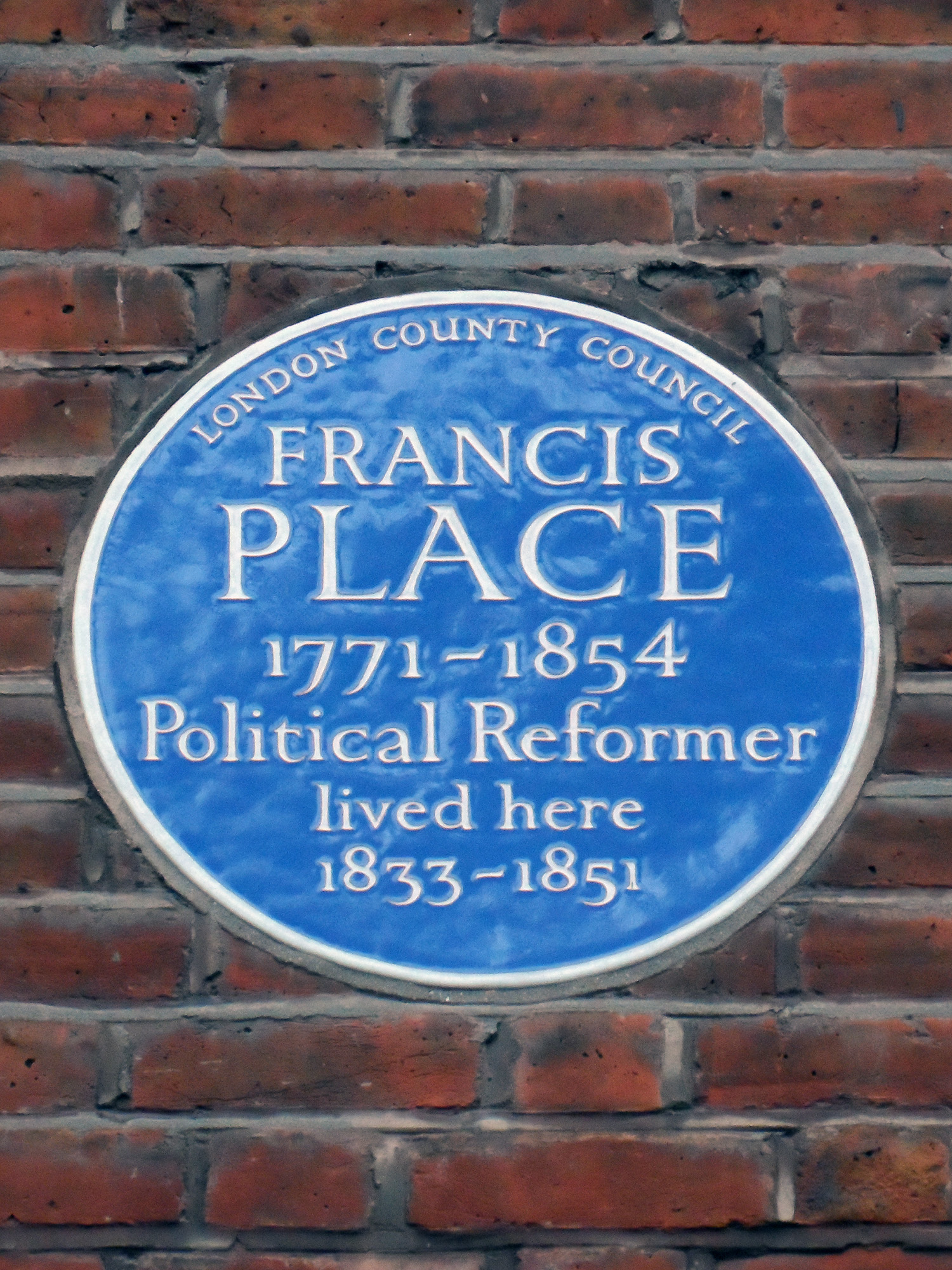
Memorial plaque to Francis Place at 21 Brompton Square

Francis Place died around midnight on New Year's Day, 1854. He was buried on 7 January, at Brompton Cemetery.

== Views ==
An early formative influence on Place's political opinions was Enquiry Concerning Political Justice (1793) by William Godwin. He took from it a type of Radical utilitarianism, and also a distrust of "abstract rights". He later could be considered a follower of Jeremy Bentham. He came to prefer the utilitarian ideas of James Mill.

Place was a Burdettite—an active supporter of Francis Burdett, with whom he shared the aim of an extension of the franchise—at least for periods 1807 to 1812, and 1818 to 1820. His support was largely expressed in organisational work for Burdett's electoral committee in the Westminster constituency.

Place's efforts on labour law were in a context assuming collective bargaining was effective. Place himself regarded trade unionism as a delusion that workers would soon forget about if they were allowed to try it.

== Family ==
On 7 March 1791, Place was married to Elizabeth Chad at St Mary's Church, Lambeth. At the time, Place was 19, and his bride was three weeks short of her seventeenth birthday. They moved to a house near the Strand. The couple had 15 children, of whom 8 reached adulthood.

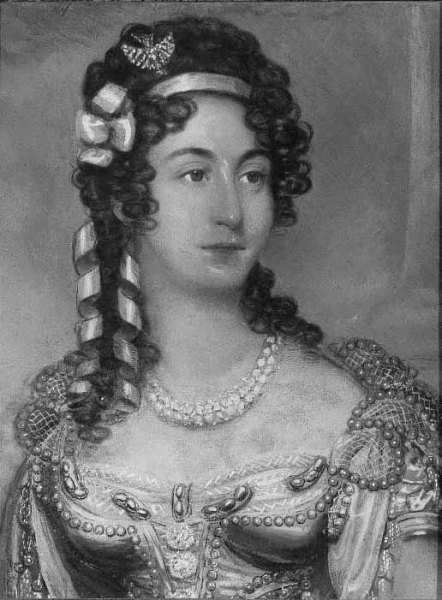
Louisa Chatterley in 1835

In 1827, Place entered a long period of depression after the death of his wife from cancer. On 13 February 1830, in Kensington, he married, secondly, Louisa Chatterley, a London actress. He separated from his wife in 1851. He then went to live in Hammersmith for two years with his daughter Annie, the wife of John Miers, and their family. He brought a house at 6, Foxley Terrace, Earls Court, Kensington, and lived there with his two unmarried daughters, Mary and Jane. Francis Place died at this address on the morning of 1 January 1854.

== Legacy ==
Place's pamphlets, letters, magazine and newspaper articles throw light on the social and economic history of the nineteenth century. His hoarding of documents created a major archive. The British Library currently holds these documents in fifty-four reels of micro-film as the Francis Place Collection. A diary he kept from 1825 to 1836 was published in 2007.

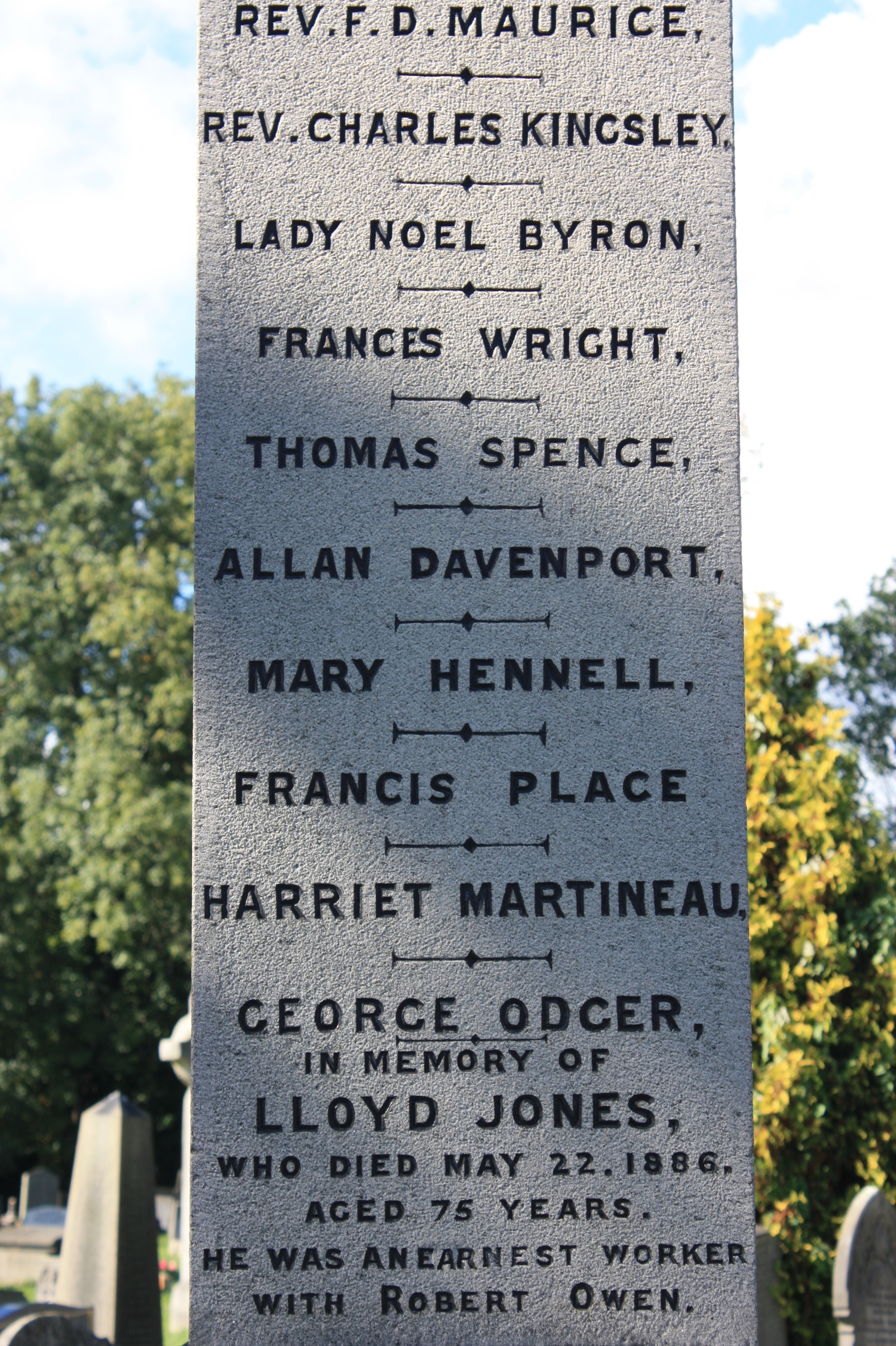
Base of the Reformers' Memorial, Kensal Green Cemetery, showing Place's name

Place is listed on the Reformers' Memorial in Kensal Green Cemetery in London.

== Bibliography ==
- Place, Francis [1822] Illustrations and Proofs of the Principles of Population, a new edition with introduction and critical and textual notes by Norman E. Himes, London, Geo. Allen and Unwin (1930)
- Wallas, Graham (2004). Life of Francis Place. Kessinger Publishing. ISBN 1417944307.
- Miles, Dudley (1988). Francis Place (1771–1854): The Life of a Remarkable Radical. Harvester Press. ISBN 9780312019532. OCLC 17298544. OL 2404657M.
