= Louisa Chatterley =

British actress (1797–1866)

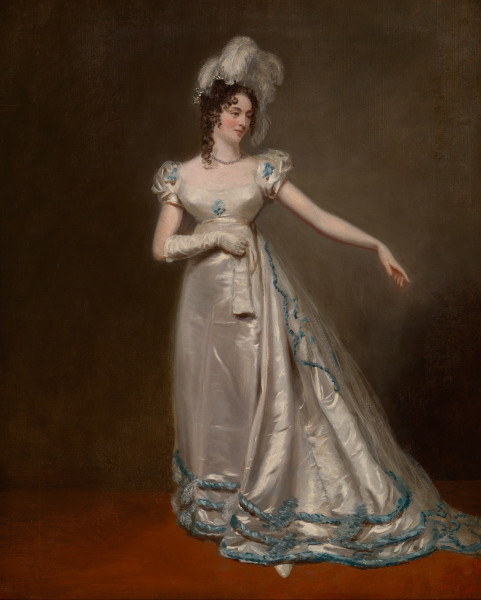
- Born: Louisa Simeon; 16 October 1797; Piccadilly, London, England
- Died: 4 November 1866 (aged 69); 37 Brompton Square, London, England
- Other names: Mrs Chatterley
- Known for: Acting
- Spouses: William Simmonds Chatterley (m. 1813; died 1822) Francis Place (m. 1830; sep. 1851)
- Partner: William Edward Taylor Christmas

Louisa Chatterley or Louisa Place born Louisa Simeon (16 October 1797 – 4 November 1866) was a British actress. She was involved in an embezzlement case, and later married a noted social reformer with fifteen children.

== Life ==
Louisa Simeon was born in Piccadilly on 16 October 1797 to Madame Simeon. From the age of three she was sent by her milliner mother to a convent near Liverpool, a boarding school in Bath and finally a seminary in London.

She married the actor William Simmonds Chatterley, at Bedminster, on 11 August 1813. The two of them both enjoyed some success. Louisa took the name "Mrs Chatterley" and worked regularly in comedic roles in Bath and London. It was said that she was particularly adept at playing a French woman. She appeared in well known plays including The Rivals, She Stoops to Conquer, and Twelve Precisely, where Chatterley was required to play twelve different roles as she tests the character of a lover. In the winter of 1821 Mrs Chatterley was earning 12 guineas a week employed at Covent Garden.

Louisa was painted in the role of Lady Teazle by George Clint and sketched by Rose Emma Drummond.

She went on to have a relationship with William Edward Taylor Christmas whilst still nominally married to William Chatterley. Christmas was a clerk at Hoares bank who had married a rich widow after he had been asked by the bank to advise her on her affairs. This was considered acceptable behaviour until he started a relationship with Chatterley. The rich widow was annoyed at Louisa's behaviour and tried to get her mother, Madame Simeon, to intercede. Meanwhile, the bank sacked him citing the poor example his lifestyle set to have one of their clerks in a relationship with "an actress". As it turned out the bank was to remember Christmas as he was discovered to have embezzled thousands of pounds. Some suspected this was to fund his time with Chatterley. Christmas was sentenced to be transported for 14 years and in 1825 he wrote an apology to the bank asking for leniency. They arranged for him to get an office job where he was again found to be forging documents.

From 1825 until 1830, she lived at 15 Brompton Square.

Her second marriage was to the social reformer Francis Place, on 13 February 1830, in Kensington. Place had 15 children and championed unfashionable reforms such as birth control. During the time she was married to Francis Place, Chatterley gave up acting. Her husband's family were not impressed by his new wife. In 1833 their finances required that they move from Charing Cross, to 21, Brompton Square. Place's son considered his father "virtuous" until he married Louisa. Francis suffered a stroke in 1844 and they separated in 1851. Her husband went to live with his children and died in 1854.

She returned to the stage after the death of Francis Place, acting at the Olympic, and Adelphi theatres.

Louisa (written as Louise on her burial and probate registers), died on 4 November 1866, at 37, Brompton Square, London. This is a short distance east of Holy Trinity Brompton. Probate of her will was granted on 29 November 1866, to Louisa Reeves Place, who was a granddaughter of Francis Place. She was buried on 10 November 1866, at Brompton Cemetery.
