= St Paul's Church, Bedford =

Church in Bedfordshire, England

St. Paul's Church
- St. Paul's Church, Bedford
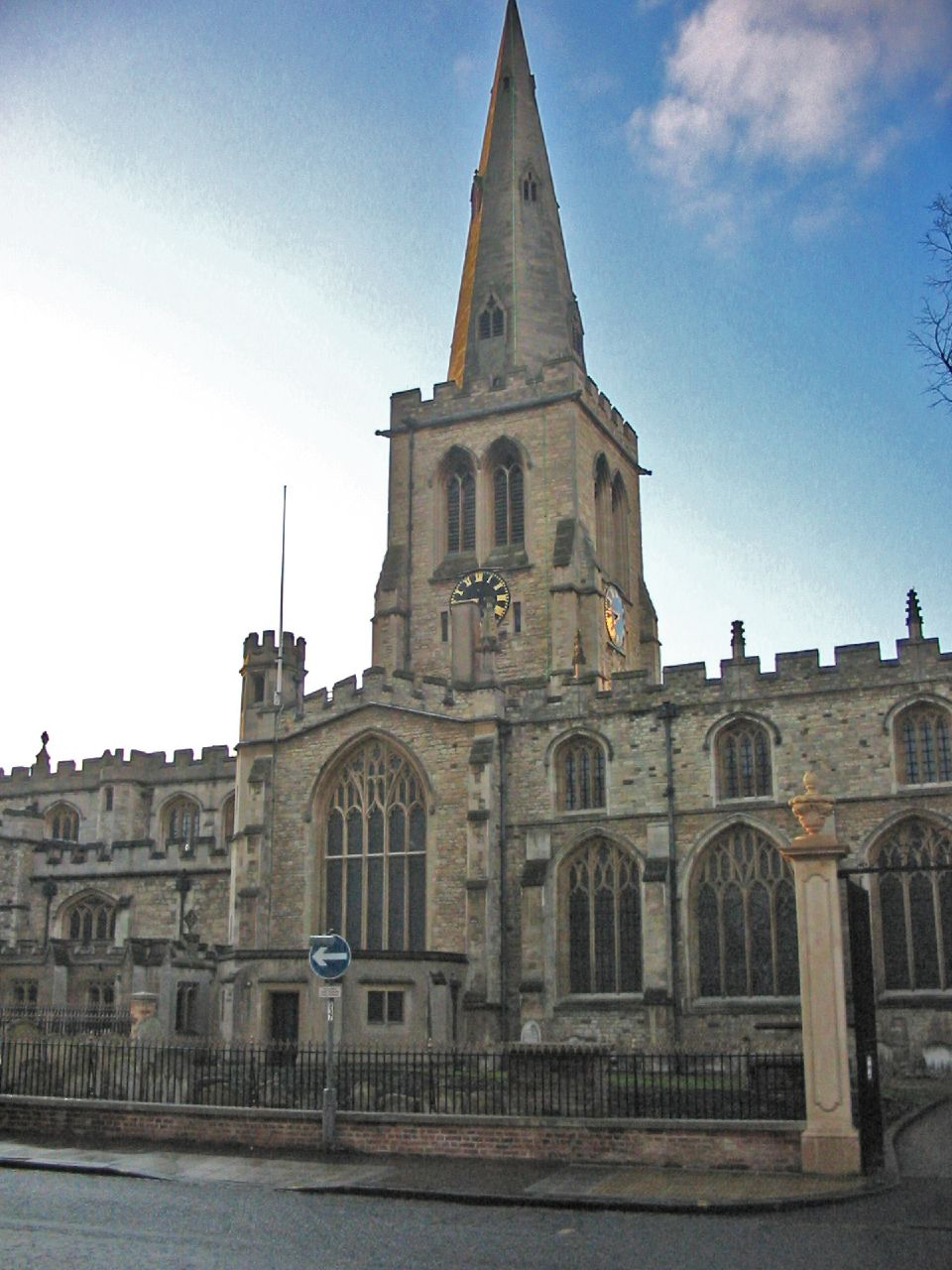
- St. Paul's Church
- 52.1355°N 0.4675°W
- Country: England
- Denomination: Church of England
- Previous denomination: Roman Catholic
- Churchmanship: Inclusive Anglo-Catholic
- Website: http://www.stpaulschurchbedford.org.uk

History
- Status: Parish church
- Dedication: Saint Paul

Architecture
- Functional status: Active
- Heritage designation: Grade I listed

Administration
- Province: Canterbury
- Diocese: St Albans
- Archdeaconry: Bedford
- Deanery: Bedford
- Parish: Bedford St Paul

Clergy
- Vicar: vacant

St Paul's Church is a Church of England parish church located on St Paul's Square in Bedford, Bedfordshire, England. Formerly a medieval collegiate church, the large building of cathedral proportions with its later additions and iconic spire dominates the town. St Paul's is the largest Anglican church in Bedfordshire, and the church exercises a ministry of welcome to thousands of visitors and pilgrims from far and wide each year. St Paul's is officially recognised as a Major Parish Church and is a member of the Major Churches Network.

Historically, St Paul's has played a key part in the life of the British nation: as the home for the BBC's daily worship during the Second World War; and the Service for the National Day of Prayer in 1941, at which the then Archbishop of Canterbury, Cosmo Gordon Lang preached, was also broadcast to the UK and wider world from the church. St Paul's is today the Civic Church of the Borough of Bedford and the County of Bedfordshire; it is a focus for special commemorations and celebrations in the borough, county, and the wider region of the East of England, as well as being a central venue for concerts, recitals and exhibitions. As well as serving a diverse parish and ministering to a congregation of all ages, the church also enjoys fine choral and liturgical worship in the English cathedral tradition. It is a grade I listed building.

== History ==
=== The first Minster ===
Some evidence exists for the founding of St Paul's Church as a new minster by King Offa (d. AD 796) to serve the inhabitants of his new fortified urban burgh. Offa is understood to have been buried in Bedford, and his Minster Church of St Paul has been identified as a probable site of his grave. The church mentioned by name in the Domesday Book of 1086 was a house of secular canons in the eleventh century, ruled by an abbot in 971, and the church in which Oscytel (or Oskytel), Archbishop of York was buried in 956, indicating that St Paul's was an important minster church from at least the tenth century onwards.

=== The second and third churches ===
From the early ninth century the priests’ mission was frequently interrupted by the invasions of the heathen Danes which continued at intervals until the arrival of the Normans in 1066. The Danes caused sporadic damage wherever they plundered or settled. They used the river to move inland to Bedford on their way westwards into the Saxon kingdoms of Mercia and Wessex, and in 1009-10 destroyed the church in the fighting. The Anglo-Saxon chronicles report that ‘forever they burnt as they went, then they turned back to the ships with their booty’.

Originally constructed in the early 13th century, the present church building has undergone numerous alterations, extensions, rebuilds and restorations since this time. An Early English south porch does survive from the original 13th-century structure, however, and records trace the existence of a previous Collegiate church on this site as far back as 1066. The Trinity Chapel of the church was first constructed in 1416, with maintenance of the chapel entrusted to the Holy Brotherhood of the Trinity. The church has long standing connections with Sir William Harpur and Dame Alice Harper, and the Trinity Chapel holds brasses of the couple. Sir William was the Lord Mayor of the City of London in 1562, and his Harpur Trust (which has a long history of operating independent schools in Bedford) has donated many of the stained glass windows in the church. Other improvements in the 15th century included Misericords in the Quire (or chancel) and two additional porches. The Trinity Chapel was used as an Archdeacon’s Court after the English Reformation.

On 23 May 1656, John Bunyan, the Christian preacher and author of "The Pilgrim's Progress", preached at St. Paul's. John Wesley, the Anglican cleric and Christian theologian (also one of the founders of Methodism) preached the Assize Sermon at the church on 10 March 1758. During the 19th century St Paul's adopted the Anglo-Catholic tradition of the Church of England, where it remains. In 1864 the Revd Michael Ferrebee Sadler was appointed taking over from the Revd William Fitzgerald. Sadler was to encourage Fanny Eagles to become a deaconess. As a result, the Sisters of Saint Etheldreda began to be associated with the parish from 1869. From 1880, the church was under the patronage of the Bishop of Ely. Architectural work to the church in the 19th century includes the tower and spire, transepts, choir stalls, quire and quire roof.

Early 20th-century work to the church includes the Rood screen (designed by George Frederick Bodley), the English Altar and altar rails (designed by the Bromsgrove Guild), and restoration work to the Trinity Chapel (instituted by C. E. Mallows). Later in the 20th century, from the mid-1970s to 1982, the church was restored and otherwise improved. In 2014 new work was completed on a Narthex at the west end of the church.

=== The church for the nation 1941-5 ===
St Paul's moved centre stage nationally to play two special roles at a time when the United Kingdom faced its darkest hour.

First, when during the Second World War, the BBC moved much of its operations out of London to Bedford, the Trinity Chapel in St Paul's was used by the BBC as the studio for broadcasting the Daily Service and The Epilogue both nationally and throughout Europe. This extraordinary period in the church's history is fittingly commemorated by an inscription on the floor at the entrance of the chapel:

THE BBC BROADCAST THE CHRISTIAN MESSAGE FROM THIS CHAPEL 1941-1945 IN THE DARKNESS OF WAR:

NATION SHALL SPEAK PEACE UNTO NATION

THEY SHALL BEAT THEIR SWORDS INTO PLOUGHSHARES

HOPE THROUGH RECONCILIATION

FORGIVENESS THROUGH UNDERSTANDING

PEACE

Secondly, at the southern end of the high altar rail, an inscription on a wooden panel records the National Day of Prayer on Sunday 7 September 1941, when the Archbishops of both Canterbury and York came together to St Paul's, Bedford to lead the worship and broadcast live to the nation at a grim time in its history. The service was broadcast to all parts of the world, to uplift and inspire 'many millions to a new endeavour to set up a kingdom of righteousness on the earth'. The church was also home to a service led by Roman Catholic Cardinal Arthur Hinsley.

=== Notable features ===
==== The organ ====
The present three manual instrument is the result of a rebuild in 2010. Although several of the 1985 tonal additions have been retained, the tonal basis of the present instrument is formed by the Norman & Beard pipework of 1900. In the 2010 rebuild all of the chorus reeds were re-voiced with a brighter tone so as to integrate with the original work. Three new replacement Mixtures and a Tuba were added to the specification and the number of stops was reduced from 66 stops down to 44, exactly the same number as in 1900. The specification may be viewed on the church website or on the National Pipe Organ Register.

==== The bells ====
The church has had a ring of bells for centuries. Currently there are twelve bells, hung for English-style change ringing. The majority of the bells were cast in 1896–7 to form a new ring of ten to replace the eight that had been in the church since around 1744, one of these original bells was retained as the ninth of the new ten, but was recast in 1945. The bells had been taken out of the tower during the Second World War, in case the church was damaged by bombing (ringing of church bells was forbidden for much of the war, reserved as an alarm in case of invasion), and were rehung in 1945. In 1977, two new bells were added, to give the present twelve, these marked the Silver Jubilee of Elizabeth II.

== The church today ==
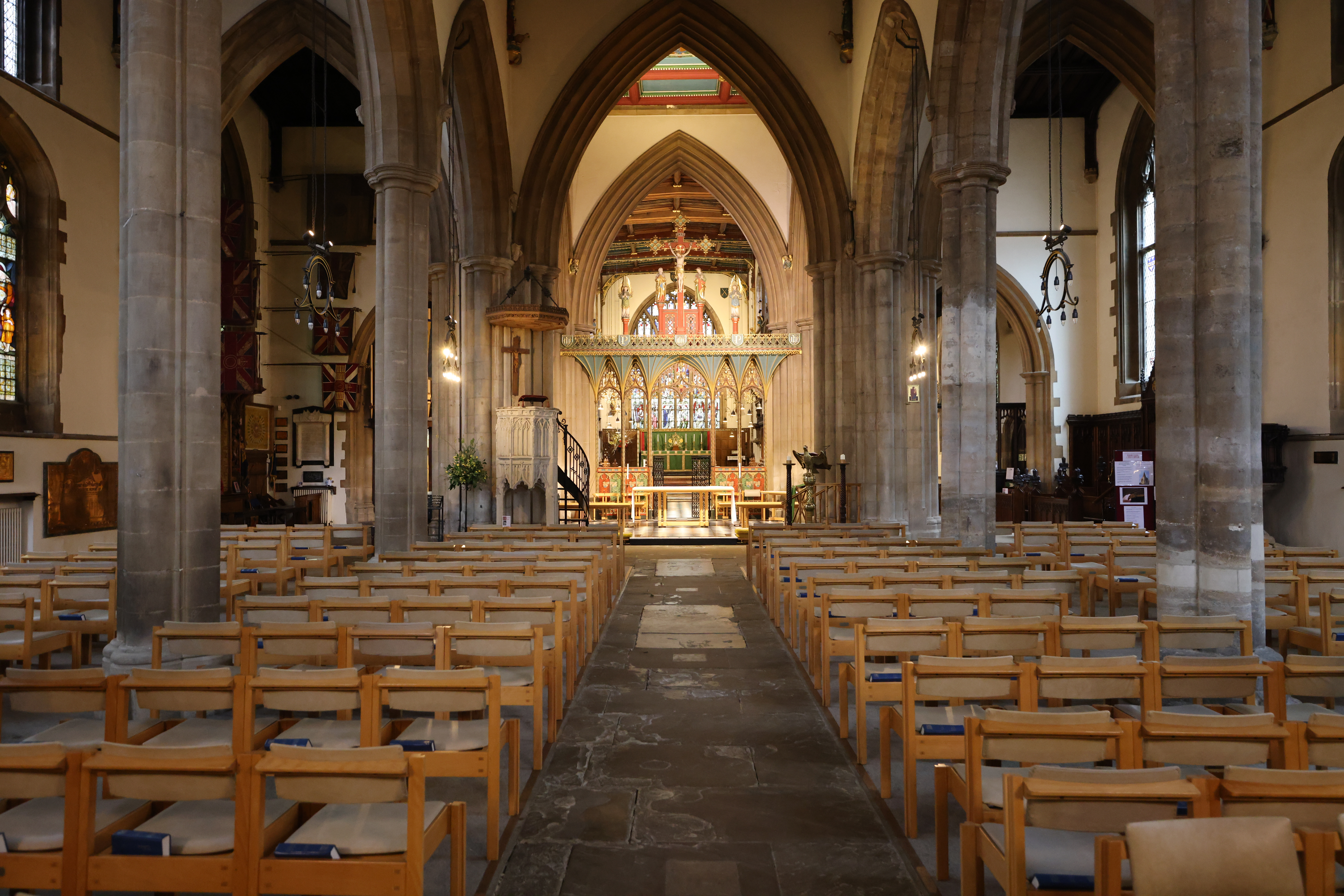
The interior of the church

St Paul's is an active Church of England parish, Civic and County church in Bedford. It supports the work of schools, voluntary and community organisations through the county and East of England, as well as the work of the Lord-Lieutenant and High Sheriff. St Paul's enjoys a cathedral choral tradition within a modern 'catholic' liturgy with appeal to all ages. The team of clergy and lay ministers is augmented by a full-time Pastoral Assistant working with those in special need seeking help from the church, as well as the many visitors throughout the year. The Church is part of the ecumenical 'Town Centre Churches' and has many links to other churches and community groups, including the 'Bedford Council of Faiths'. The church is a member of the Major Churches Network and of Cathedrals Plus.

=== Sunday services ===
10.15 Parish Eucharist

- Sung Parish Eucharist with Address

The ministry of prayer for healing is offered on the 4th Sunday

5.30 Evening Service as announced

=== Weekday services ===
Monday 9.00 a.m. Morning Prayer on Zoom

Tuesday 9.00 a.m. Morning Prayer on Zoom; 4.30 p.m. Evening Prayer

Wednesday 9.00 a.m. Morning Prayer on Zoom; 12 Noon Eucharist

Thursday 9.00 a.m. Morning Prayer on Zoom

Friday 9.00 a.m. Morning Prayer on Zoom; 9.30 a.m. Eucharist

Saturday 9.00 a.m. Morning Prayer; 9.30 a.m. Eucharist

The church opens every day for private prayer from 10.00 a.m. to 3.00 p.m.

== Vicars of St Paul's ==
Prior to 1528 the church was served by the Priory and Canons of the Blessed Virgin May and St Paul's Newnham. A Vicarage was established in 1528

- 1528 John Berde
- 1550 Reginald West STB
- 1554 Henry Atkinson
- 1555 Edward Tailor
- 1562 Emere Bedforde
- 1572 Ralph Jones STB
- 1584 Edward Noke
- 1601 Andrew Dennys MA
- 1606 John Beamont MA
- 1617 Theodore Crowley MA
- 1633 George Smithe MA
- 1638 John Bradshaw
- (1640 living sequestered)
- 1662 Robert Guidott MA
- 1664 John Wilson STB
- 1666 John Bradshaw
- 1671 Richard Pearson MA
- 1672 William Jackson STB
- 1673 Arthur Humphreys MA
- 1677 Edward Bourne MA
- 1689 Alexander Leith MA
- 1732 Francis Hunt BA
- 1738 Robert Lambe BA
- 1749 William Smith BA
- 1782 John Hemsted MA
- 1824 James Donne MA
- 1861 William George Fitzgerald MA
- 1864 Michael Ferrebee Sadler MA also Prebendary of Wells
- 1870 Robert Aitken Bennett BA
- 1877 Robert Edward Reginald Watts MA
- 1886 Lambert Woodard MA later Honorary Canon of Ely
- 1913 Jocelyn Henry Speck MA also Honorary Canon of St Albans
- 1922 William Aubrey Robins MA later Archdeacon of Bedford
- 1936 Alan St George Colthurst MA
- 1946 Cyril Patrick Hankey MA later Dean of Ely
- 1951 Cyril Francis Leolin Hilditch AKC
- 1954 John Humphrey King MBE MA also Honorary Canon of St Albans
- 1969 Robert Saville Brown MA later Archdeacon of Bedford
- 1974 Basil Henry Jones
- 1975 Nicholas Guy Coulton BD later Provost and Dean of Newcastle
- 1990 Christopher Paul Collingwood MA BMus later Canon Chancellor, York Minister
- 1998 John Glanville Pedlar BA also Honorary Canon of St Albans
- 2014 Kevin Ian Goss MA GRSM LRAM LTCL LGSM also Honorary Canon of St Albans

== See also ==
The Rogue's March
