= Achilleas Kallakis =

Convicted fraudster

Achilleas Michalis Kallakis
- Born: Stefan Michalis Kollakis; 3 September 1968 (age 58); Ealing, London, England
- Education: University of Buckingham
- Known for: "Britain's most successful serial confidence trickster"
- Spouse: Pamela A. Stachowsky (m.1995)
- Children: 4

Achilleas Michalis Kallakis (born Stefan Michalis Kollakis on 3 September 1968) is responsible for the UK's largest ever mortgage fraud, of over £760 million, and has been called "Britain's most successful serial confidence trickster". By making a slight change to his name, purporting to be related to an oil and property tycoon and using a corrupt lawyer, he was able to defraud banks into giving him mortgages on offices with inflated valuations. He and his accomplice Alexander Williams were successfully prosecuted by the UK's Serious Fraud Office in 2013. Kallakis and Williams succeeded in bypassing fraud and due diligence checks by the banks despite having a previous convictions for fraud in 1995 and warning being raised about their lawyer who escaped prosecution.

== Early life and family ==
Kollakis was born in Ealing, west London, on 3 September 1968, the son of Michael S Kollakis and Erinoula Angelinakis, who married in Glamorgan in 1967. His father was a port captain and once ran an unsuccessful nightclub in Liverpool. The family lived in Ealing. He is the nephew of shipping magnate Lou Kollakis. He attended the University of Buckingham where he met his future partner in crime Martin Lewis.

== Criminal career ==
Kollakis once worked as a travel agent in Croydon. His first conviction for fraud was for the sale of bogus manorial titles to Americans in the early 1990s with his conspirator Martin Lewis. After their conviction, Kollakis changed his name to Achilleas Kallakis and Martin Lewis to Alexander Martin Williams.

In the early 2000s, Kallakis and Williams began a new fraud, using various aliases, offshore trusts and fake references to borrow large sums of money to buy prime London properties, often for more than they were worth. He bought buildings let to the British Home Office in Croydon and the headquarters of the Telegraph Media Group at 111 Buckingham Palace Road in Victoria, which he purchased from the Barclay brothers in 2007.

He owned 31 Brompton Square, bought in the mid-2000s for £28 million, and had the entire garden dug out to a depth of 30 feet to build a three-storey basement. The project was abandoned in 2008 after the Kallakis was jailed and the property went into receivership, remaining a building site for 9 years before being sold to the Issa brothers for £25m in 2017.

Kallakis lived a luxurious lifestyle, gambling in London's casinos and owning several cars, including a Bentley Azure, another Bentley, a Ferrari Scaglietti and a Mercedes. He falsely claimed to be an "ambassador for the Republic of San Marino" and the author of Maritime Registries of the World and The Wonders of Italy, and to serve on a committee of the National Portrait Gallery in London.

The fraud began to be discovered in 2008 when a German bank did some background checks on Kallakis after Allied Irish Banks attempted to sell some of the loans it had made to him. In 2013, he was sentenced to seven years imprisonment and Williams to five for defrauding the Bank of Scotland, AIB and other lenders.

== Personal life ==
In 1995, Kollakis married Pamela A. Stachowsky in Ealing. They had four children together.
