= John Tidd Pratt =

English barrister and civil servant

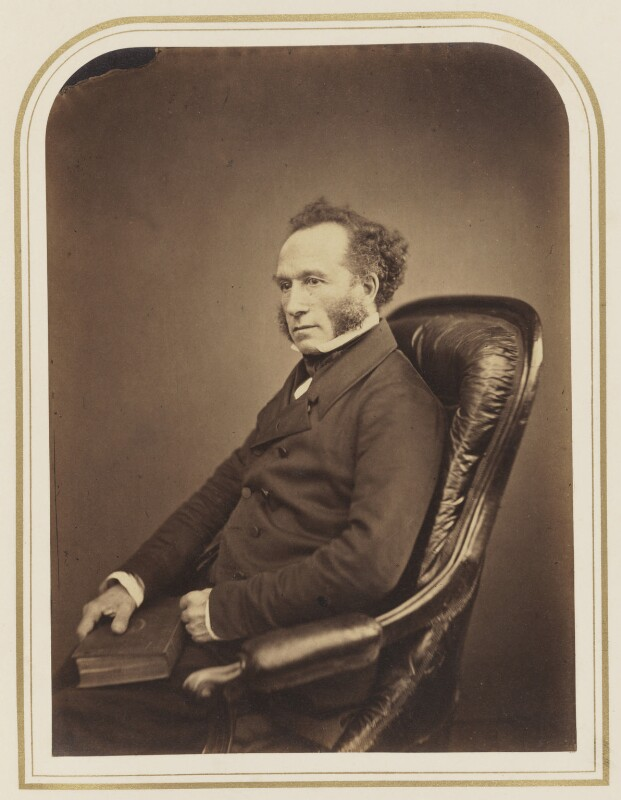
- Born: 13 December 1797; London
- Died: 9 January 1870 (aged 72); Westminster
- Occupations: Barrister and civil servant

John Tidd Pratt (13 December 1797 – 9 January 1870) was an English barrister and civil servant. He was a registrar of friendly societies.

== Biography ==
Pratt was the second son of John Pratt, surgeon, Kennington, Surrey. He was born in London on 13 December 1797. He was admitted as a student at the Inner Temple on 2 April 1819, was called to the bar on 26 November 1824, and went the home circuit. From 1828 to his death he was consulting barrister to the commissioners for the reduction of the national debt. He was counsel to certify the rules of savings banks and friendly societies from 1834 to 1846, and registrar of friendly societies from 1846 to his death. To the public he rendered efficient service, by disclosing, as far as official restraints allowed him, the unsound condition of some of the benefit and friendly societies, and by recommending to the legislature modes of remedying their defects. He was in the commission of the peace for Middlesex, Westminster, Kent, Surrey, Sussex, and the Cinque ports. He died at 29 Abingdon Street, Westminster, on 9 January 1870. His wife, Anne, died on 25 November 1875.

He edited J. B. Bosanquet and Christopher Puller's ‘New Reports of Cases argued in the Court of Common Pleas and other Courts,’ 1826; E. Bott's ‘Laws relating to the Poor,’ 6th edit. 1827; and W. Woodfall's ‘Law of Landlord and Tenant,’ 1829. He wrote ‘History of the Savings Banks in England and Wales,’ in 1830 (2nd edit. 1842), ‘The Law relating to Highways,’ in 1835, (13th edit. 1893), and ‘The Law relating to Watching and Lighting Parishes,’ in 1850, (5th edit. 1891), and these were still in use as of 1896. Other works by him are:

- ‘An Abstract of all the printed Acts of Parliament for the establishment of Courts of Request,’ 1824.
- ‘A digested Index to the Term Reports analytically arranged, containing all the Points of Law determined in the King's Bench, 1785 to 1825, in the Common Pleas 1788 to 1825, and in the Exchequer, 1792 to 1825, with Notes,’ 1826.
- ‘An Epitome of the Law of Landlord and Tenant,’ 1826.
- ‘A Collection of the late Statutes passed for the administration of Criminal Justice in England, 1827; 2nd edit. 1827.
- ‘The Law relating to Savings Banks in England and Ireland,’ 1828.
- ‘Statutes passed in the present Session for the administration of Criminal Justice in England,’ 1828.
- ‘A Summary of the Office of a Justice of the Peace out of Sessions,’ 1828.
- ‘The Law relating to Friendly Societies,’ 1829. This work went to several editions, and had various changes made in the title, the contents, and the arrangement.
- ‘The Laws relating to the Poor,’ 1833.
- ‘The Act for the Amendment of the Laws relating to the Poor,’ 1834.
- ‘A Collection of the Public General Statutes passed 5 & 6 Will. IV., 7 Will. IV. and 1 Vict. 2 & 3 Vict., 3 & 4 Vict., 4 & 5 Vict., 5 & 6 Vict., 6 & 7 Vict., as far as they are relative to the Office of a Justice of the Peace and to Parochial Matters,’ 1835, 1837, 1839, 1840, 1841, 1842, and 1843, 7 vols.
- ‘The General Turnpike Road Acts,’ 1837.
- ‘The Law for facilitating the Enclosure of Open and Arable Fields,’ 1837.
- ‘The Property Tax Act,’ 1842, 2nd edit. 1843.
- ‘A Collection of all the Statutes in force respecting the Relief of the Poor,’ 1835–64, 2 vols.; 2nd edit. 1843. Vol. i. of the first edition was compiled by J. Paterson.
- ‘A Summary of the Savings Banks in England, Scotland, Wales, and Ireland,’ 1846.
- ‘Suggestions for the Establishment of Friendly Societies,’ 1855.
- ‘Index to Acts relating to Friendly Societies,’ 1860.
- ‘Observations on Friendly Societies for Payments at Death, commonly called Burial Societies,’ 1868.
