= Brompton Square =

Garden square in Brompton, London

Coordinates: 51.4980°N 0.1687°W

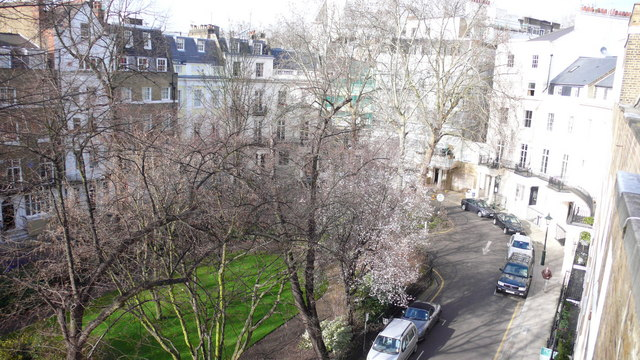
Brompton Square, 2008

Brompton Square is a garden square in London's Brompton district, in the Royal Borough of Kensington and Chelsea.

== History ==
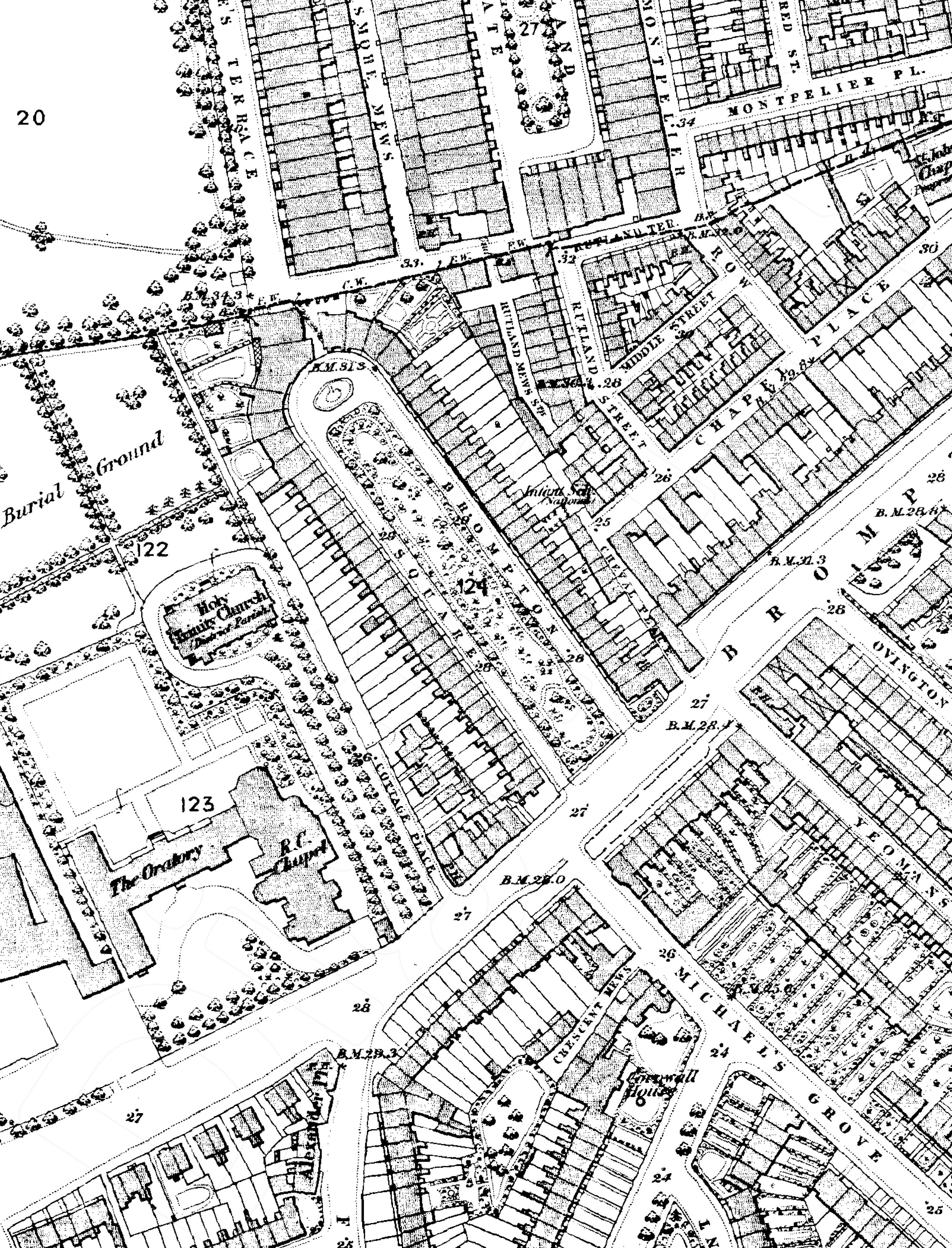
Brompton Square (centre) on an 1860s Ordnance Survey map

The initial development of the square was undertaken by James Bonnin in 1821.

== Listed buildings ==
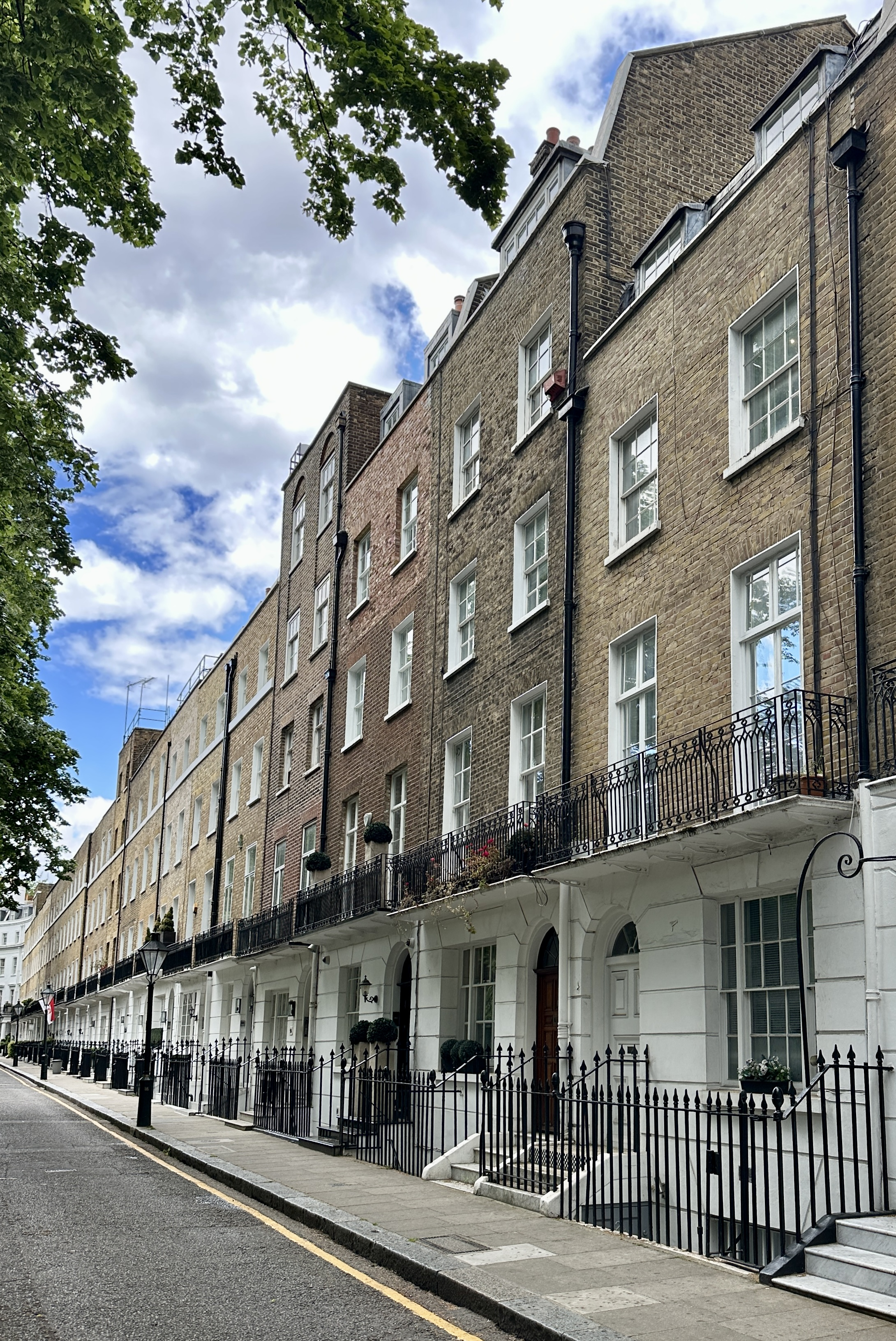
Houses in Brompton Square, 2026

Many of the houses that surround Brompton Square are Grade II listed on the National Heritage List for England. The individual listed houses on the square are 27, 31a, 56, 57 and 58. The houses listed in groups and pairs are 3–9, 10–12, 13–16, 17–19, 20–25, 28–31, 32–36, 37–53, 54–55 and 59–60. A stuccoed doric portico forms part of 31 Brompton Square and is listed as 36 Ennismore Gardens.

== Notable residents ==
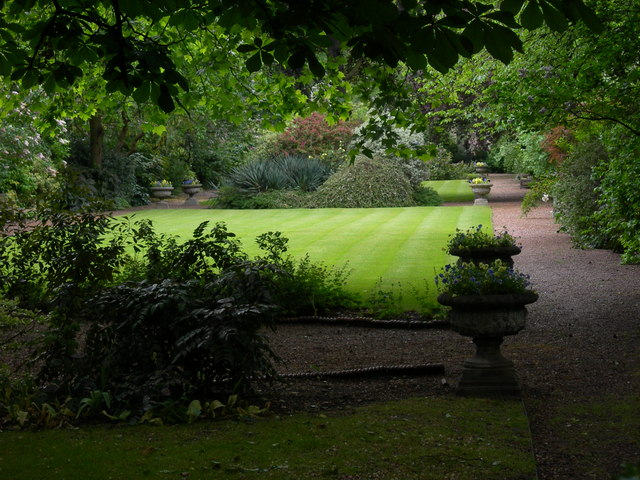
Brompton Square Gardens, 2007, private gardens in the centre of the square for the use of residents

Notable residents have included:

- No. 6 was home to the poet Stéphane Mallarmé in 1863, and a blue plaque commemorates this.
- No. 13 was home to the writer and lawyer Sir John Stoddart, who died there in 1856.
- No. 14 was home to the musical theatre composer Edward Fitzwilliam.
- No. 21 was home to the political reformer Francis Place and his wife, the actress Louisa Chatterley, from 1833 to 1851, and a blue plaque commemorates Place's residency. It had previously been the home of the Italian conductor Ernesto Spagnoletti between 1829 and 1833.
- No. 22 was home to the playwright George Colman, who died there in 1836; it was later the home of the actor James Vining and Shirley Brooks, the editor of Punch.
- No. 23 was home to the actor William Farren, who died there in 1861.
- No. 25 was home to the novelist E. F. Benson, and a blue plaque commemorates this. It is the setting for his 1927 book Lucia in London.
- No. 27 was used from 1861 (along with No. 48) as a convent and convalescent home by the Nursing Sisters of the Church of England, who later moved to St Peter's Convent, Kilburn, then to Woking; in the early 20th century it was a nursing home owned by a Mrs Lucy Catherine Jervis. Lucile Agnes Dickson, the wife of the early film director William Kennedy Dickson, died at the house in 1908 under the care of Mrs Jervis, and Dickson would later rent rooms at the house for several years.
- No. 28 was purchased by Gavin Henderson, 2nd Baron Faringdon, in 1953 and is now home to the Faringdon Collection of art.
- No. 31 was bought in the mid-2000s by Achilleas Kallakis, "Britain's most successful serial confidence trickster", for £28 million; he had the entire garden dug out to a depth of 30 feet to build a three-storey basement. The project was abandoned in 2008. As of 2017, it is for sale at £25 million.
- No. 35 was home to William Hook Morley, barrister and orientalist, who died there in 1860.
- No. 39 is the London home of Roland Emmerich, German film director, screenwriter, and producer.
- No. 43 was home to Richard Burchett, artist and educator.

Mary Melissa Hoadley Dodge, the American heiress, lived there. The writer on natural history Mary Roberts lived and died there. The engineer Charles Anthony Corbett Wilson was born there in 1827.

William Henry Rhodes-Moorhouse, the Royal Air Force fighter pilot and flying ace killed in action during the Battle of Britain, was born there in 1914. Robin Hill, 8th Marquess of Downshire, was born there in 1929.

In the late 19th century the Brompton district was very popular with actors, and Brompton Square was at some point home to the performers John Liston (No. 40), Mary and Robert Keeley (No. 19), J. B. Buckstone (No. 6) and Horace and Alfred Wigan.
