= Woburn, Bedfordshire =

Village in Bedfordshire, England

Coordinates: 51.98826°N 0.61942°W

Woburn
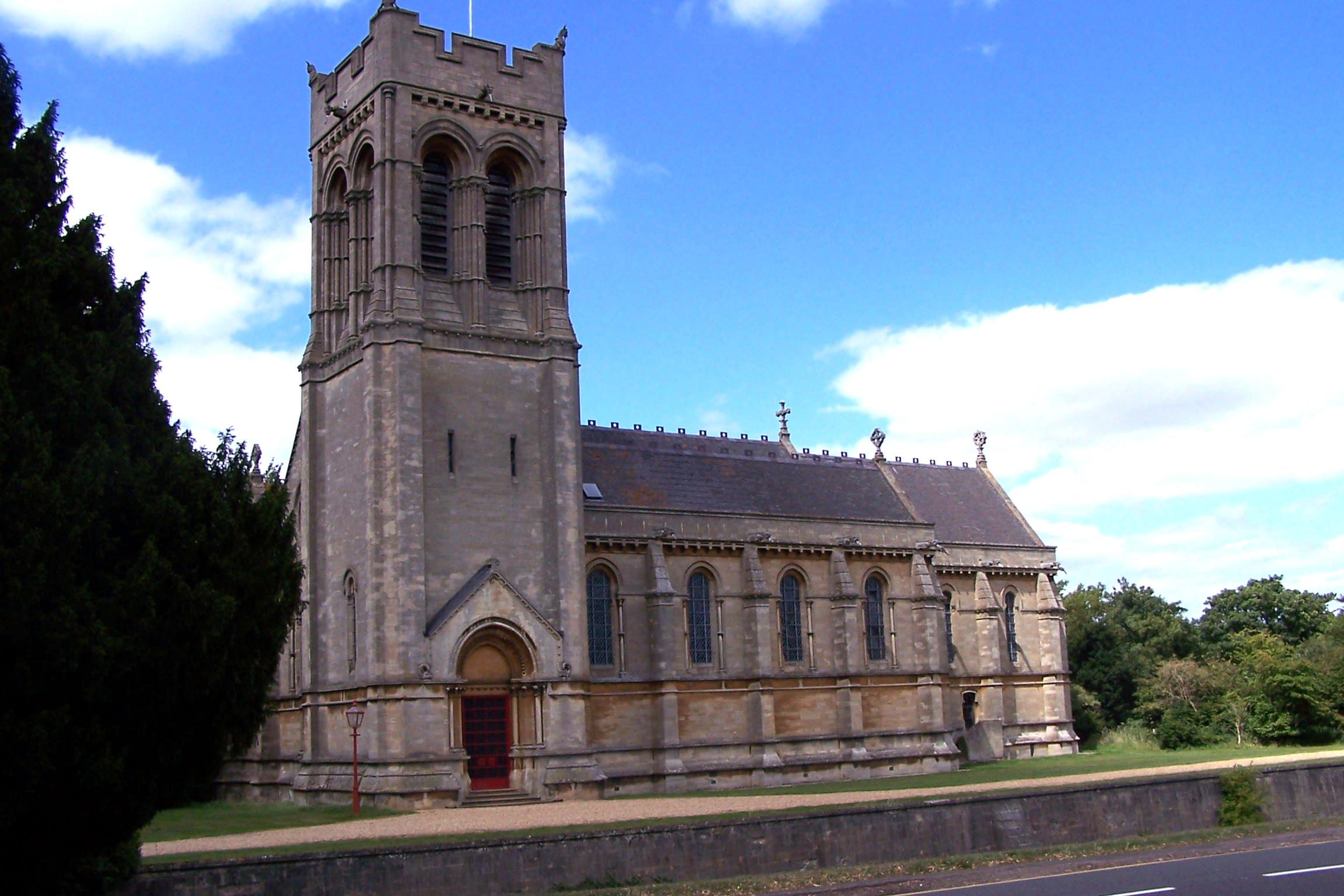
- St Mary's parish church in Woburn

- Location within Bedfordshire
- Interactive map of Woburn
- Population: 933 (2011)
- OS grid reference: SP949331
- Civil parish: Woburn
- Unitary authority: Central Bedfordshire
- Ceremonial county: Bedfordshire
- Region: East
- Country: England
- Sovereign state: United Kingdom
- Post town: MILTON KEYNES
- Postcode district: MK17
- Dialling code: 01525
- Police: Bedfordshire
- Fire: Bedfordshire
- Ambulance: East of England
- UK Parliament: Mid Bedfordshire

Woburn (/ˈwoʊbərn/, meaning twisted or crooked stream) is a village and civil parish in Bedfordshire, England, about 5 miles (8 km) southeast of Milton Keynes and 3 miles (5 km) south of junction 13 of the M1 motorway. At the 2011 census, it had a population of 933.

== History ==
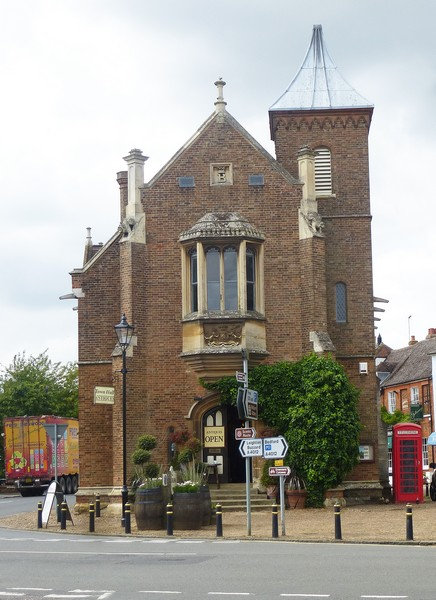
Woburn Town Hall

Woburn was first recorded as a hamlet in 969 and is listed in the Domesday Book of 1086. It is best known as the location of Woburn Abbey (a stately home) and Woburn Safari Park. The abbey was founded by Cistercian monks in 1145 and granted to the first Earl of Bedford in 1538 after the dissolution of the monasteries. The town may have been called "Woburne Chapell" in medieval times, in order to distinguish it from the abbey. Woburn has been burned down and rebuilt three times. A medieval chimney fire spread owing to the prevalence of thatched roofs and closely built houses. Then, during the English Civil War, the Cavaliers burned down much of the town and in 1724 a third fire destroyed much of the town, which was rebuilt in the Georgian style that remains today.

During the nineteenth century, Woburn was an important staging post on the London–Newport Pagnell–Northampton turnpike. The town had 27 inns and the first 24-hour post office outside London. However, with Woburn being bypassed by (what became) the West Coast Main Line and the Grand Union canal (north–south) and the Varsity Line (east–west), Woburn's location ceased to be so significant. The population fell from 2,100 in 1851 to 700 about a century later.

Woburn Town Hall, designed by Edward Blore, was completed in 1830. Under the 8th Duke of Bedford, a new parish church was completed in Woburn in 1868. It was equipped with a crypt beneath, which was originally intended as the burial place of the Dukes of Bedford and their family. In the end the dukes continued to use the ancient mausoleum at St Michael's, Chenies, and the crypt of St Mary's parish church in Woburn is now used for events and meetings. The hatch through which coffins would have been lowered into the crypt is still visible.

Woburn Cottage Hospital was established by Mary, the Duchess of Bedford (1865-1937) in 1898. The hospital remained open until at least 1935.

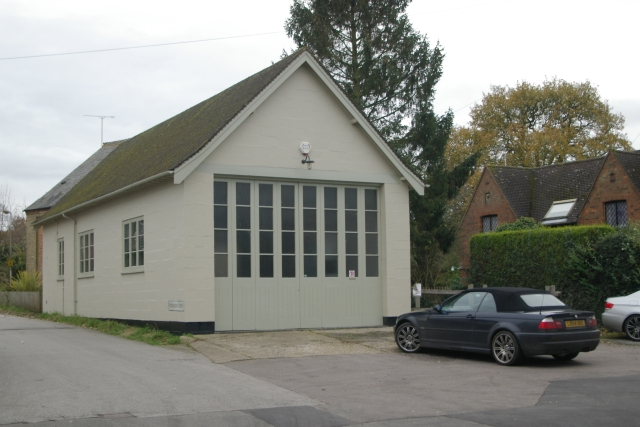
Woburn Old Fire Station, built in 1947

Despite burning down three times in its history, the first permanent fire station was only recorded in 1823, situated in front of the Tudor School. The station moved in 1947 to purpose-built premises on Leighton Street. Today a modern fire station stands on London Road.

== Sports and leisure facilities ==
Woburn has its own lido (outdoor swimming pool). In addition to the walks and cycling opportunities afforded by the Estate and the local roads, Woburn lies across the routes of both the Greensand Ridge Walk and the Greensand Cycle Way.

Woburn Golf Club, 2.5 miles (4.0 km) west of Woburn, has hosted the Women's British Open eleven times between 1984 and 2019.

== Climate ==
Woburn experiences an oceanic climate (Köppen climate classification Cfb) as is typical of almost all of the United Kingdom.

There is a Met Office weather station in Woburn. Recorded temperature extremes range from 39.6 °C (103.3 °F) during July 2022, to as low as −20.6 °C (−5.1 °F) on 25 February 1947. In 2010, the temperature fell to −16.3 °C (2.7 °F)

Climate data for Woburn (1991–2020 normals, extremes 1898-)
| Month | Jan | Feb | Mar | Apr | May | Jun | Jul | Aug | Sep | Oct | Nov | Dec | Year |
|---|---|---|---|---|---|---|---|---|---|---|---|---|---|
| Record high °C (°F) | 15.0 (59.0) | 18.9 (66.0) | 22.8 (73.0) | 27.1 (80.8) | 32.9 (91.2) | 33.3 (91.9) | 39.6 (103.3) | 35.5 (95.9) | 32.8 (91.0) | 27.3 (81.1) | 19.4 (66.9) | 16.0 (60.8) | 39.6 (103.3) |
| Mean daily maximum °C (°F) | 7.4 (45.3) | 8.0 (46.4) | 10.6 (51.1) | 13.8 (56.8) | 16.9 (62.4) | 20.0 (68.0) | 22.4 (72.3) | 22.1 (71.8) | 19.0 (66.2) | 14.7 (58.5) | 10.3 (50.5) | 7.7 (45.9) | 14.4 (57.9) |
| Daily mean °C (°F) | 4.5 (40.1) | 4.7 (40.5) | 6.7 (44.1) | 8.9 (48.0) | 11.9 (53.4) | 14.9 (58.8) | 17.2 (63.0) | 17.0 (62.6) | 14.4 (57.9) | 11.0 (51.8) | 7.2 (45.0) | 4.8 (40.6) | 10.3 (50.5) |
| Mean daily minimum °C (°F) | 1.6 (34.9) | 1.5 (34.7) | 2.7 (36.9) | 4.1 (39.4) | 6.8 (44.2) | 9.8 (49.6) | 11.9 (53.4) | 12.0 (53.6) | 9.8 (49.6) | 7.3 (45.1) | 4.1 (39.4) | 1.8 (35.2) | 6.1 (43.0) |
| Record low °C (°F) | −20.0 (−4.0) | −20.6 (−5.1) | −15.0 (5.0) | −7.3 (18.9) | −5.6 (21.9) | −1.1 (30.0) | 1.2 (34.2) | 1.7 (35.1) | −2.8 (27.0) | −7.8 (18.0) | −13.9 (7.0) | −17.4 (0.7) | −20.6 (−5.1) |
| Average precipitation mm (inches) | 55.4 (2.18) | 44.6 (1.76) | 39.6 (1.56) | 48.3 (1.90) | 51.9 (2.04) | 54.2 (2.13) | 51.2 (2.02) | 58.6 (2.31) | 55.4 (2.18) | 70.7 (2.78) | 64.5 (2.54) | 58.2 (2.29) | 652.3 (25.68) |
| Average precipitation days (≥ 1.0 mm) | 11.7 | 10.0 | 9.3 | 9.7 | 8.7 | 9.2 | 8.5 | 9.4 | 9.1 | 11.0 | 11.7 | 11.5 | 119.7 |
| Mean monthly sunshine hours | 53.0 | 72.3 | 114.9 | 151.9 | 191.5 | 185.7 | 198.4 | 185.3 | 141.6 | 104.5 | 62.0 | 48.3 | 1,509.4 |
Source 1: Met Office
Source 2: Starlings Roost Weather

== Freedom of the Town ==
The following people and military units have received the Freedom of the Town of Woburn.

=== Individuals ===
- Gillian "Gill" Green: 1 February 2025.

== See also ==
- Center Parcs Woburn Forest (7 miles (11 km) away, between Millbrook and Steppingley).
