= Clophill =

Village in Bedfordshire, England

Coordinates: 52.027°N 0.425°W

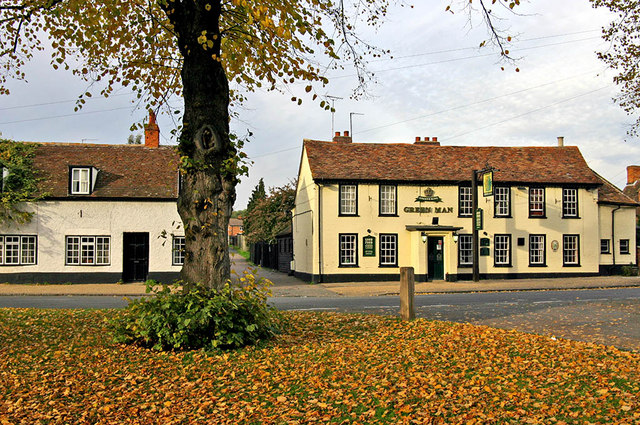
- Clophill

- Location within Bedfordshire
- Population: 1,750; 1,738 (2011 Census)
- OS grid reference: TL086380
- Unitary authority: Central Bedfordshire
- Ceremonial county: Bedfordshire
- Region: East
- Country: England
- Sovereign state: United Kingdom
- Post town: BEDFORD
- Postcode district: MK45
- Dialling code: 01525
- Police: Bedfordshire
- Fire: Bedfordshire
- Ambulance: East of England
- UK Parliament: Mid Bedfordshire

Clophill is a village and civil parish clustered on the north bank of the River Flit, (Note: A sub-tributary of the Great Ouse) Bedfordshire, England. It is recorded in the Domesday Book of 1086 as Clopelle. "Clop" likely means 'tree-stump' in Old English. However, it also has cognate terms for clay, with which the soil of mid Bedfordshire is rich.

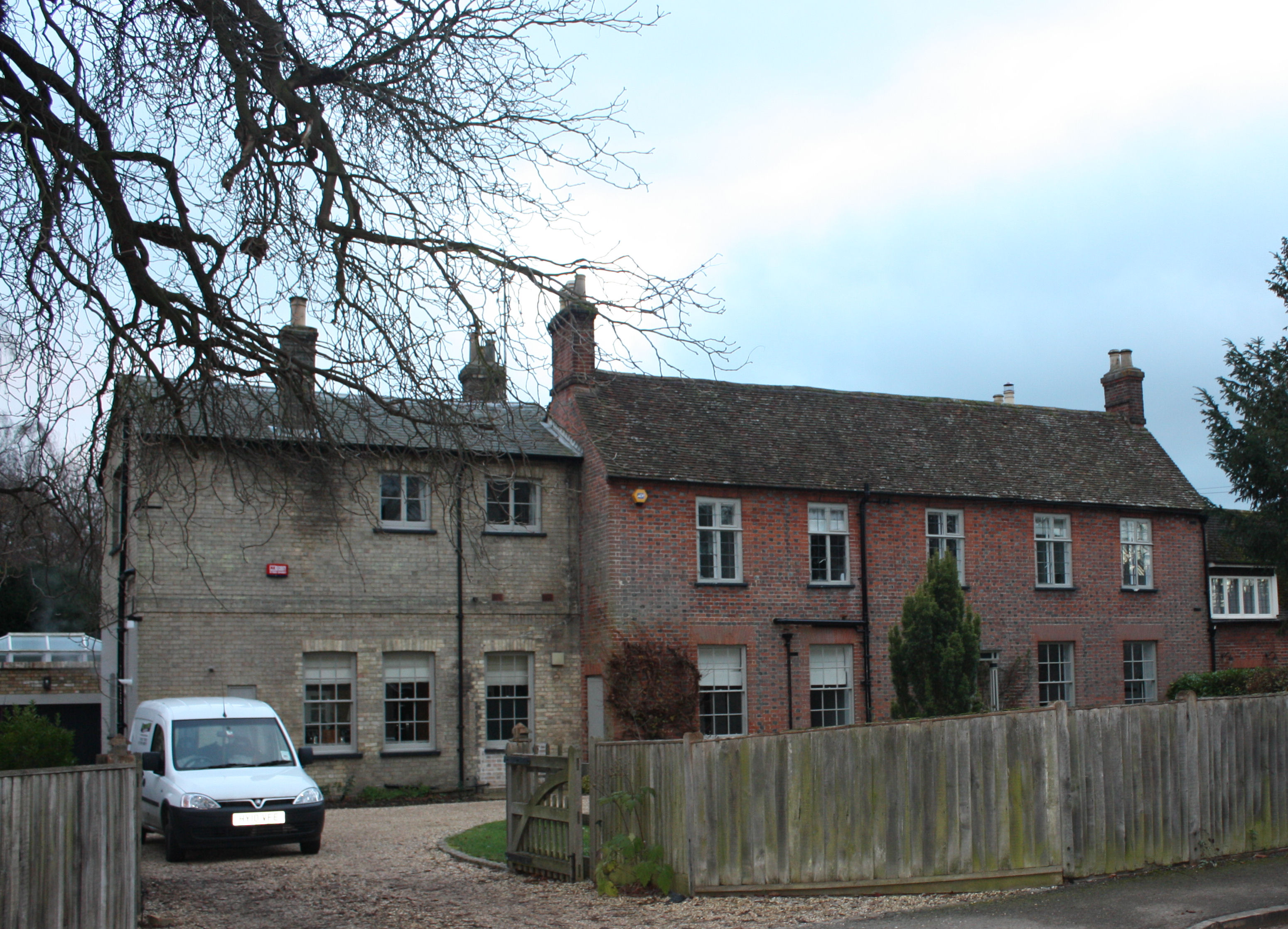
The Old Rectory

== Extent and demography ==
In the 1851 census, the men of the parish numbered 560; of these, 238 were agricultural labourers; women numbered. In the 2011 Census the population was 1,750.

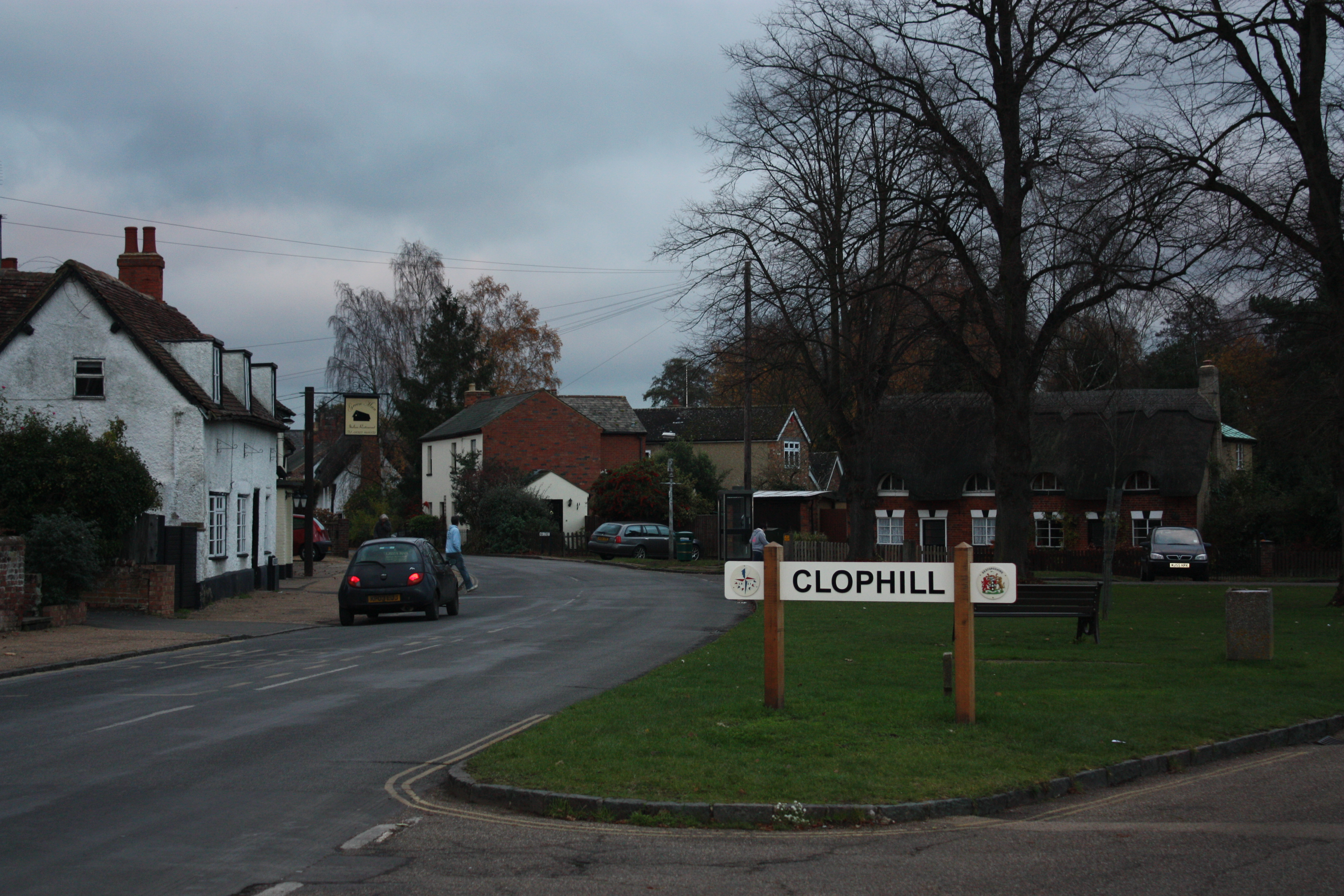
Entering Clophill

The contiguous housing of Clophill Road and its side streets falls into the civil and ecclesiastical parishes of Maulden.

== Church ==
=== St Mary's old church ===
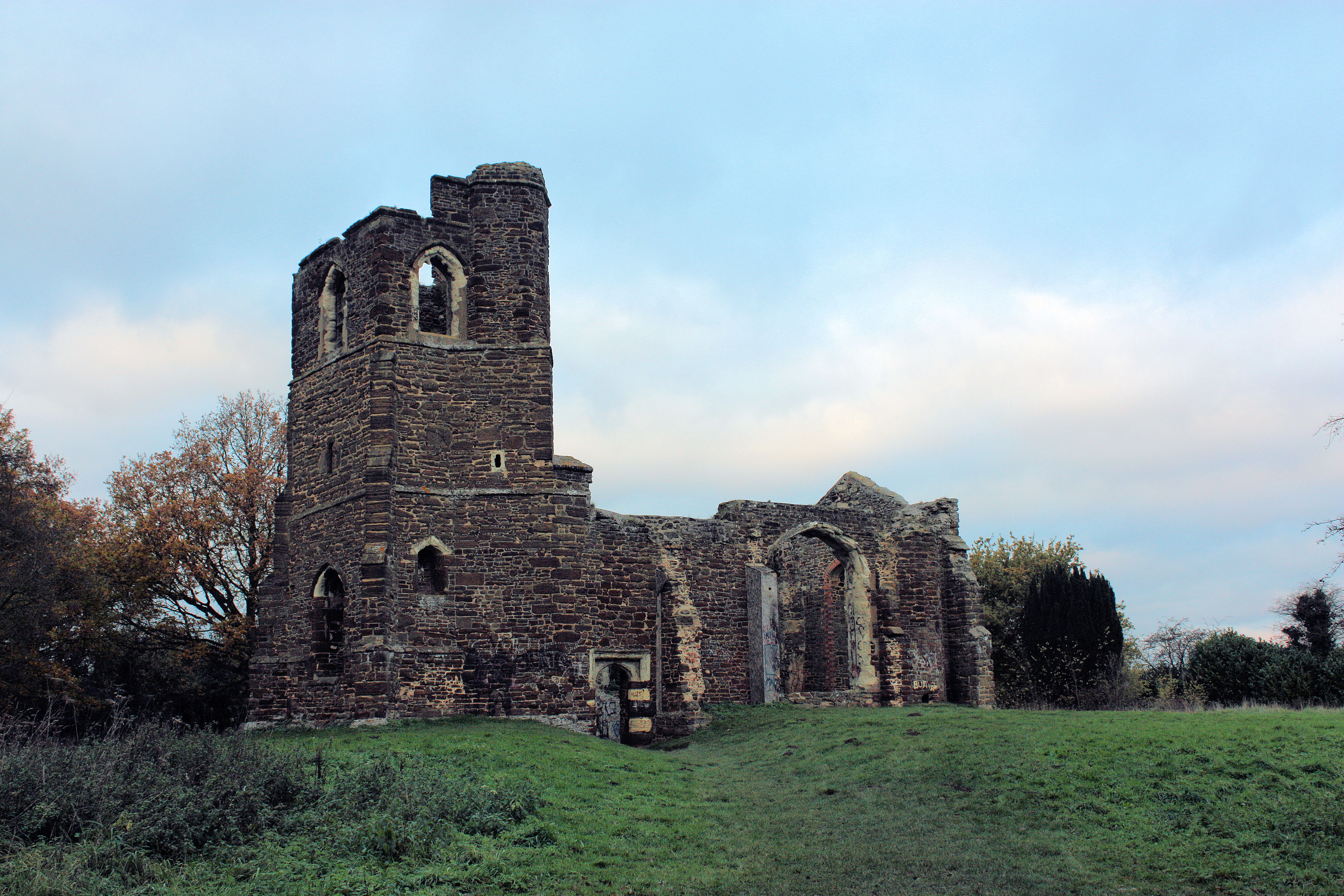
St Mary's old church

The old St Mary's Church was built around 1350, and replaced by a new church in the 1840s (250 m SSW). It gradually fell into ruin, and as an inactive church, had restoration carried out for secular purposes in the early 2010s.

=== Active churches ===
The new St Mary's church is in the High Street, built 1848–1849. The current rector is Rev. Lynda Klimas. It is the only church of the Church of England parish, which reflects the civil parish having the A6 Bedford Road as its western limit.

Clophill Methodist Church has an active congregation, social meetings on site and in the schoolroom and was built in about the year 1930. It joins with St Mary's Church in some major services.

== Education ==
The majority of the community is in the catchment zone for Robert Bloomfield Academy.

== Notable residents ==
- Boss Meyer, educator and cricketer. Founder of Millfield School.
- David L. Englin, politician
- Jimmy Husband, (born 15 October 1947), retired professional footballer
- John van Weenen, OMT MBE, (born 26 August 1941, Enfield, Middlesex), 8th Dan karateka and humanitarian
- Sir Douglas Frederick Howard, KCMG, MC, (15 February 1897 – 26 December 1987), diplomat

== Sports and leisure facilities ==
The Greensand Ridge Walk and the Greensand Cycle Way pass through Clophill.

The village has a youth football club called Clophill United FC. The 2023/24 season has nine teams (U6 to U18) playing in the Mid Beds Mini League, Chiltern Junior 7s and Beds Youth Saturday League.

In the summer of 2022, Clophill St Mary's Lower School and Clophill United joined forces to form one club affiliated with the Bedfordshire Football Association. The aim of the merger being to secure football in the village for children from reception to under 18, providing continuity for teams as they develop over the years, especially as they graduate from lower school.
