= Wixams Academy =

Location
- Green Lane; Wixams; Bedfordshire, MK42 6BA; England; 52.0873°N 0.4687°W

Information
- Type: Free school
- Established: 2017
- Local authority: Bedford Borough Council
- Trust: Knowledge Schools Trust
- Department for Education URN: 144595 Tables
- Ofsted: Reports
- Principal: Nathaniel Wilson
- Gender: Co-educational
- Age: 11 to 18
- Enrollment: 933
- Website: www.wixamsacademy.co.uk

Wixams Academy is a co-educational secondary school and sixth form located in Wixams in the English county of Bedfordshire.

The school was constructed by Willmott Dixon and opened in 2017. It was opened by Bedford College Academies Trust which has subsequently merged with Knowledge Schools Trust in March 2024. It serves the new town development of Wixams as well as Wilstead and other nearby villages.

Wixams Academy offers GCSEs and BTECs as programmes of study for pupils. The school was due to launch a sixth form in 2022, however in April 2019 it was announced that the school was no longer planning to offer this provision. However the school then confirmed a sixth form would open as originally planned in September 2022.
