= Central Bedfordshire College =

Further education college in Bedfordshire, England

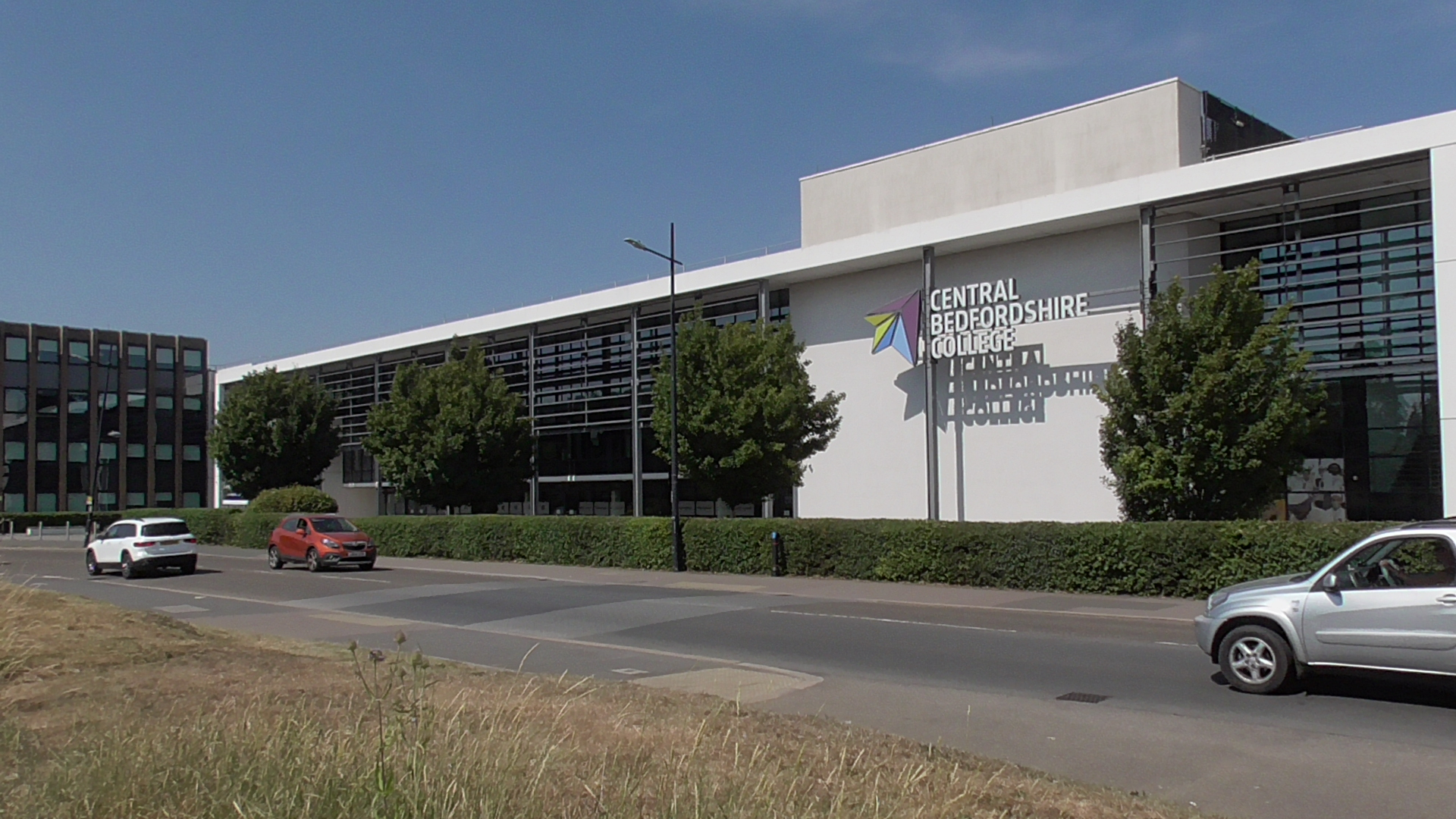
- Former name: Dunstable College
- Type: Further education
- Established: 2010 (1961)
- Principal: Susan Hadfield
- Location: Dunstable, Bedfordshire, England; 51.891°N 0.519°W
- Website: www.centralbeds.ac.uk

Central Bedfordshire College (formerly Dunstable College, also known as CBC) is a British further education college located in Bedfordshire, England. The college was established in 1961 in Dunstable. On 14 January 2010, the college was renamed Central Bedfordshire College. The college is part of the Bedford College Group since 2023. At the time, Sarah Mortimer CBE, then principal and chief executive, explained that the change of name was to reflect the college's commitment to Central Bedfordshire as a whole and be recognised as the premier post sixteen institution in the area.

Today, the college has four campuses across Central Bedfordshire, in Dunstable, Houghton Regis, Luton and Leighton Buzzard. The college offers a range of courses, full-time and part-time, vocational and academic, from further education to higher education.

The college was a co-sponsor of UTC Central Bedfordshire, a university technical college which operated at the Houghton Regis campus of Central Bedfordshire College from 2012 until 2016.

Courses include:

- Access courses
- A Levels
- Apprenticeships
- Art & Design
- Beauty & Holistic Therapies
- Business & Administration
- Childcare
- Construction
- Counselling
- Engineering
- English language
- English for Speakers of Other Languages
- First Aid
- Floristry
- Food Hygiene
- GCSEs
- Hairdressing
- Health & Social Care
- Health and Safety
- Information Technology & Computing
- Maths
- Pathways
- Performing Arts
- Public Services
- Psychology
- Security
- Sign Language
- Spanish
- Sports & Sports Therapy
- Sugarcraft
- Teacher Training
- Trade Union Studies
- Travel & Tourism
- Vocational Studies
- Welding
- Logistics
- Chiltern Business Training courses

The college was merged into Bedford College in 2023.
