= Greensand Cycle Way =

Cycle route in England

"Greensand Cycleway" signs for this route appeared in the first half of 2014. It covers roughly 40 miles (64 km), using minor roads and runs roughly in parallel with its sister walk, the Greensand Ridge Walk. The route traverses Bedfordshire, making brief forays into the neighbouring counties of Cambridgeshire and Buckinghamshire. Its southern endpoint is at Leighton Buzzard and the route runs north-east to Sandy. The waymarker for this route is simply Greensand Cycleway and the depiction of a bicycle on a brown background. There are some smaller, circular waymarkers employed to ensure continuity of the route for cyclists.

A map of the route can be found on "OpenStreetMap".

== Route ==
=== Ampthill to Haynes ===
At the end of Abbey Lane (Ampthill), there is a T-junction with the Flitwick Road (Malden). Turn left and then right into New Road alongside open fields. You will briefly merge with Silsoe Road before turning right into Water End. There are a number of pretty thatched cottages here, as well as Water End Fisheries, a coarse fishing site.

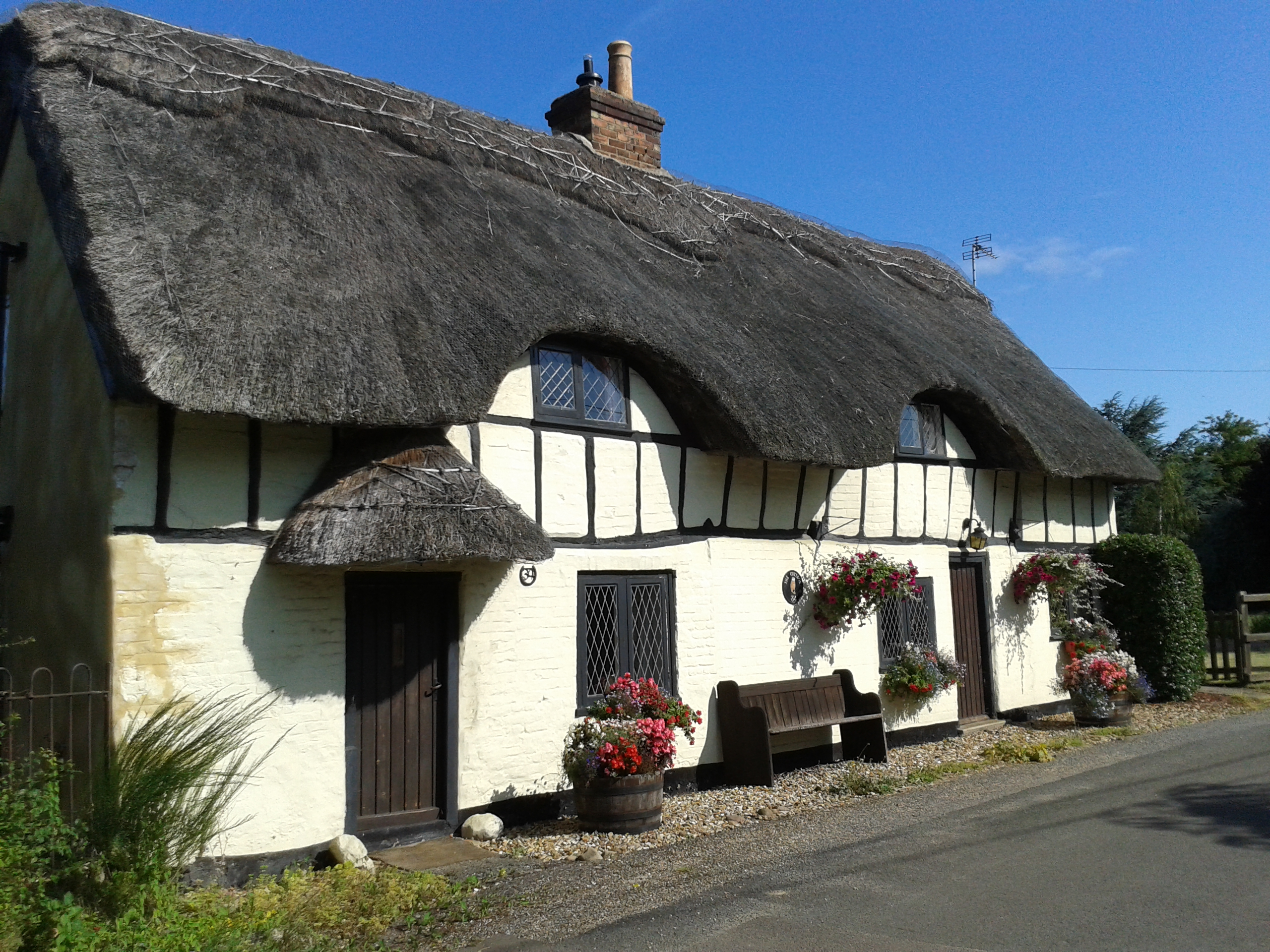
Pretty Bedfordshire cottage
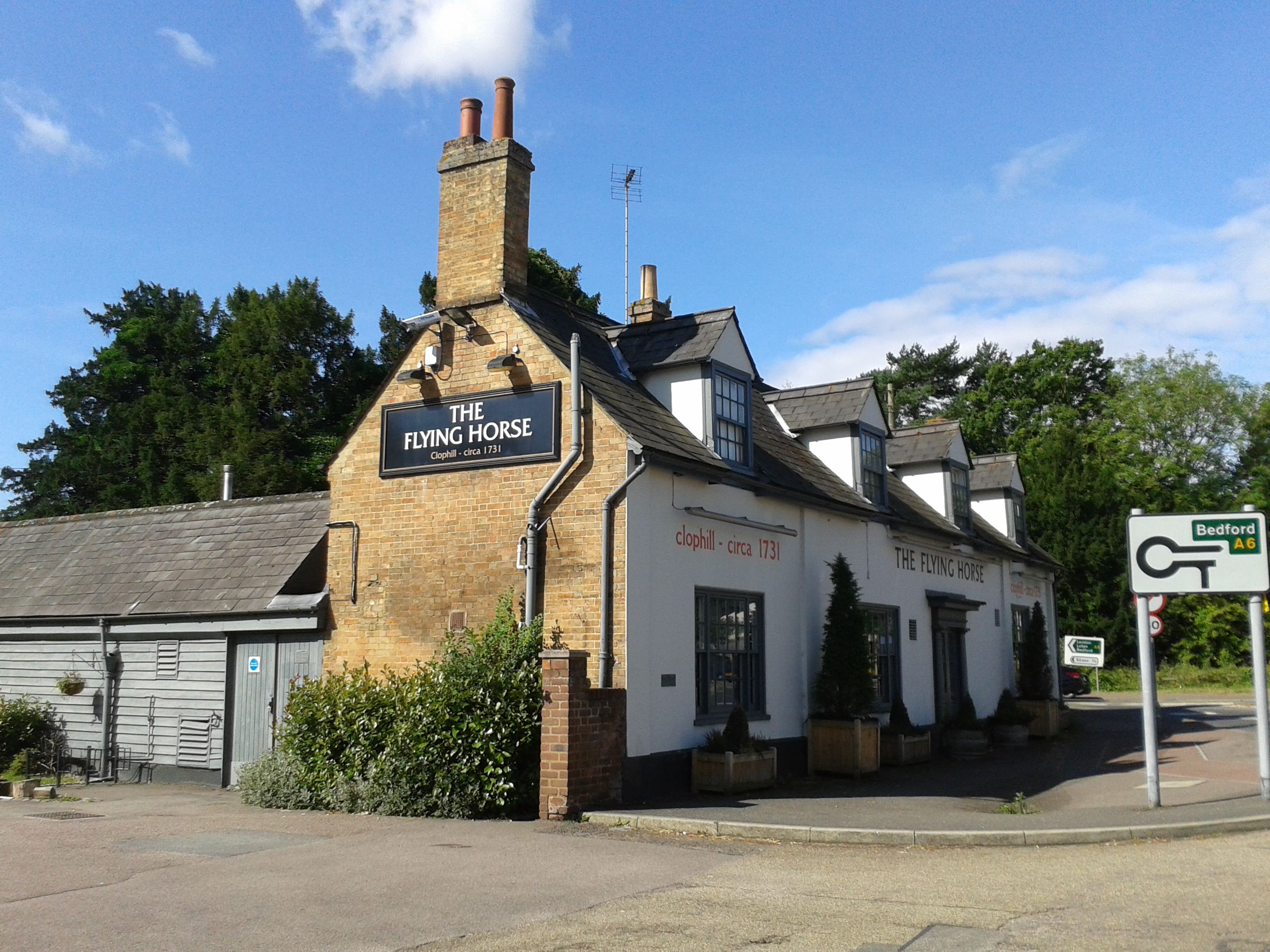
The Flying Horse, Clophill
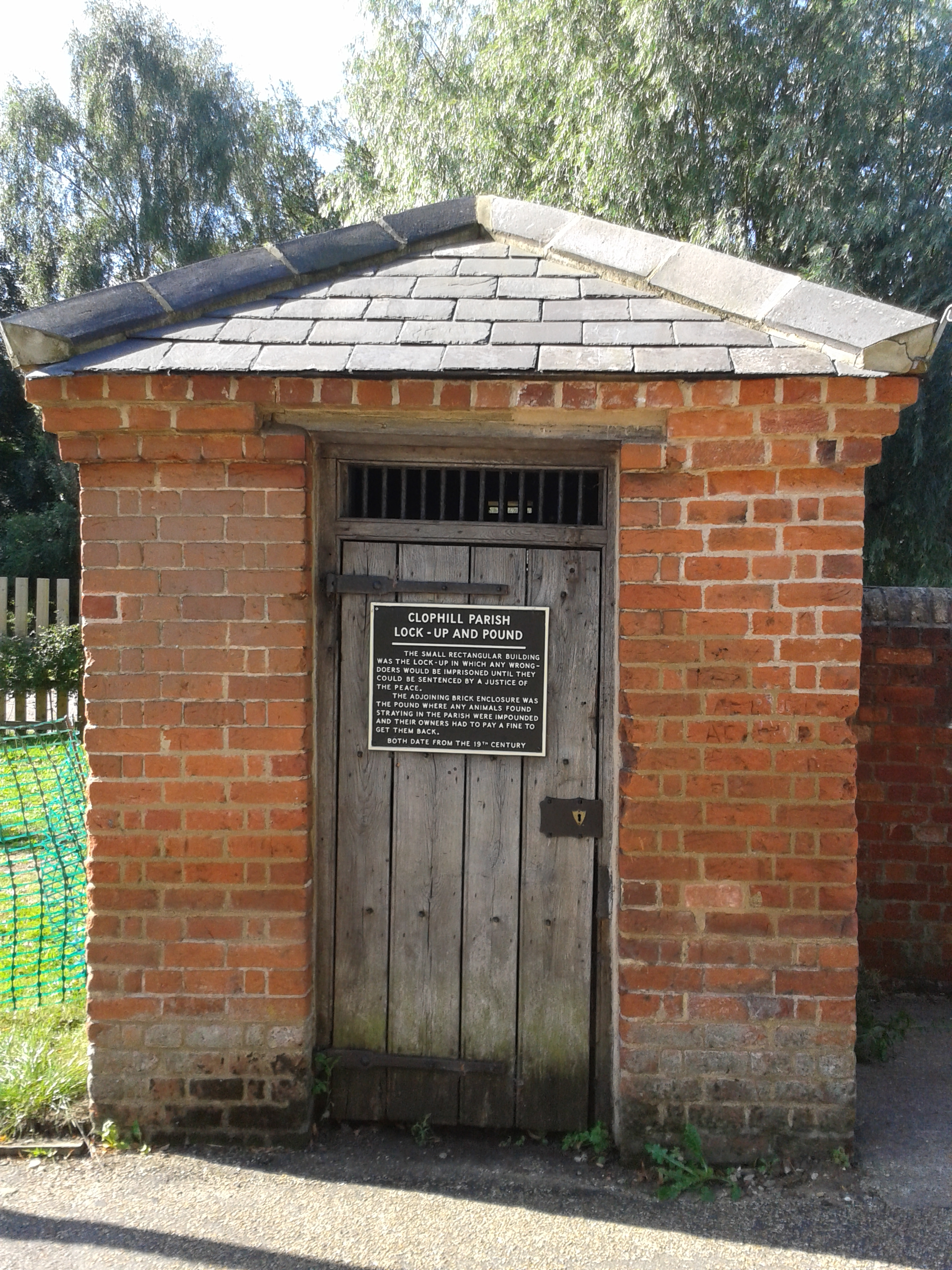
Lock-up and pound in Clophill

Follow the road round until you come to Clophill Road. Here you can take advantage of the old "Dog and Badger" pub on the left to quench your thirst or appetite, but the route continues right, along the Clophill Road to meet with the Bedford Road (A6) - make sure you follow the Clophill Road round to the left and not onto the A507.

Take care crossing the A6 at this point. You can choose to leave the route here and follow the A6 towards Luton briefly, in order to drop into Silsoe and along to Wrest Park and its 3 centuries of parklands. Otherwise continue into Clophill and past the "Flying Horse" pub dating from about 1731. The village green boasts a "lock-up and pound" where once were kept any stray animals which were released back to their owners for a fine, a small convenience store with post office and snack bar, an Italian restaurant in the old "Green Man" - there is also a real ale pub, "the Stone Jug" which is a little off the route in Back Lane.

To continue the route, follow Shefford Road through the village, past the Mill House and the primary school. Turn left into Great Lane, a scenic route to Haynes, and follow this narrow, wooded country lane up over the hill until you meet with Church Lane (Haynes). There is quite a good view of Haynes Park, the house, from the top of the lane looking across the fields.

=== Haynes to Sandy ===
Turn right downhill on Church End Road. About 50m on the left is Church Lane and St Mary's Church where Queen Anne of Denmark and James I attended church on 30 July 1605. The route, however, follows Church End Road and then continues as it becomes Standalone Warren. At Appley Wood Corner you will see an entrance to "Chicksands Woods", which is part owned by the Ministry of Defence (United Kingdom). There is also a cycle, foot and bridle path leading towards Shefford, Bedfordshire from this location.

Staying on the Greensand Cycleway, continue along Standalone Warren until the next T-junction. Bear right and continue on to the crossroads with the A600. "Chicksands Bike Park" is at the top of the warren in "Rowney Warren Woods" on the right. A refreshment van has been known to ply its trade at this location at weekends and holidays.

Cross the A600 and continue along Standalone Warren, keeping the woodland on your right. Follow the road round passed Southill Sawmills and continue onto the Bedford Road towards Old Warden. Old Warden comprises a number of pretty cottages, a village hall, the Hare & Hounds pub, a cricket club and church. It is also home to the Shuttleworth Collection and Shuttleworth College (Bedfordshire), an agricultural college. Continue along Bedford Road bearing left downhill past the cricket grounds and the Abbey Church of St Leonard. Turn left down Warden Road towards Ickwell.

Ickwell is a striking hamlet with its oversized village green which commodiously accommodates the village cricket club and some very old oaks. The cycle route continues along through the green and out towards Northill where the "Crown", a pub and restaurant, parts of which date back to the 17th century, awaits between the church and the village pond.

Continue through the village and towards Thorncote Green and Franklin's farm and poultry shop with their "freerange children". Continue along Thorncote Road until Hatch where you follow the signs right, along a path leading to Brook End Farm. Cross the staggered crossroads into the lane that leads to the Green at Beeston, mentioned in the Domesday Book of 1086 as Bistone. Turn right along the Green and left into the Crescent. To continue the route, cross the bridge over the A1, follow the road for 50m before turning right into "The Baulk" and through the path over the River Ivel. Here follow the path round to the right leading to Ivel Road and then on to the High Street at Sandy, Bedfordshire. Buses are to be had in the town centre turning left along High Street, or trains from the station further down High Street to the right.

A good cycleway from the A1 at the north end of Sandy leads westwards back to Bedford.
