= Woburn Town Hall =

Municipal building in Woburn, Bedfordshire, England

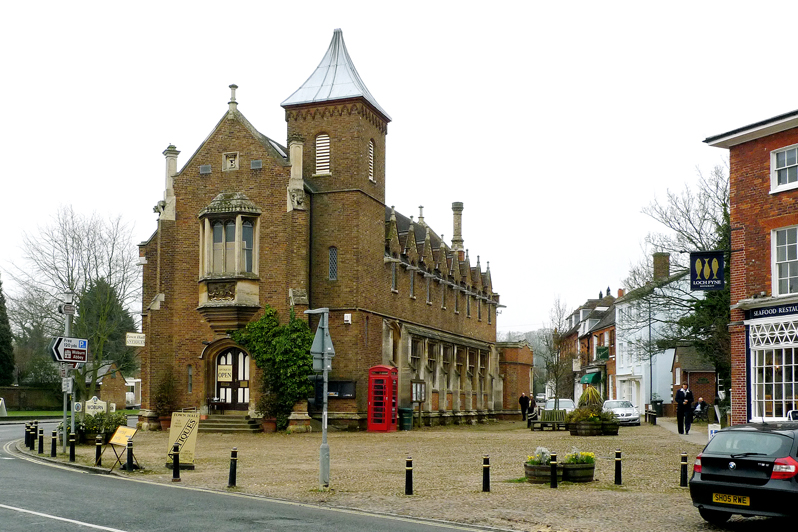
- Woburn Town Hall

- Shown in Bedfordshire
- 51.9885°N 0.6194°W
- Location: Market Place, Woburn

History
- Built: 1830

Site notes
- Architect: Edward Blore
- Architectural style: Jacobethan style

Listed Building – Grade II
- Official name: Town Hall, Market Place
- Designated: 16 March 1987
- Reference no.: 1321662

Woburn Town Hall is a municipal building in the Market Place, Woburn, Bedfordshire, England. The town hall, which has largely been converted for retail use, is a Grade II listed building.

== History ==
The first municipal building in Woburn was a three-storey market hall commissioned by the John Russell, 4th Duke of Bedford and completed in 1737. The ground floor was used as a shambles i.e. a meat market. On each side there was a Doric order peristyle and at roof level there was a cupola and a weather vane. By the early 19th century the building was dilapidated and John Russell, 6th Duke of Bedford decided to demolish it and to replace it with a new structure on the same site.

The new building was designed by Edward Blore in the Jacobethan style, built in brown brick with ashlar stone dressings and was completed in 1830. The design involved a broadly symmetrical main frontage with a single bay facing northeast onto the High Street; there was a doorway with an archivolt on the ground floor, an oriel window on the first floor and a gable containing a panel with the crest of the Dukes of Bedford above. On the south west elevation there were nine bays, separated by buttresses and gabled at roof level; the bays were mainly fenestrated with three-light mullioned and transomed windows on the ground floor and with small round headed windows on the first floor. A three-stage tower with a pyramid-shaped roof formed part of the northwest elevation of the building. Internally, the principal room was the assembly hall on the first floor.

The building continued to be owned by successive Dukes of Bedford although they did not charge rent for its use. It was largely used by the local parish for community events and as a courthouse for petty session hearings for Woburn and the surrounding parishes. It was also home to a public library known as the Woburn Institute until 1884, when the institute relocated and the building was subsequently restored at the expense of Francis Russell, 9th Duke of Bedford. A short single-storey extension to the southwest was commissioned by Herbrand Russell, 11th Duke of Bedford in 1912. After the First World War, the 2nd Battalion, the Bedfordshire Regiment presented two German field guns, which the regiment had captured at the Battle of the Selle, to the 11th Duke, who chose to display one of guns outside the town hall in the late 1930s.

In November 1944, during the Second World War, the future Home Secretary, Roy Jenkins, who at the time was working as a code breaker at Bletchley Park, attended a dance at the town hall. In September 1958, the town hall was the venue for a speech by local member of parliament, Alan Lennox-Boyd, who was then serving as Secretary of State for the Colonies, during which he was repeatedly interrupted by Empire Loyalists. The ground floor was converted into offices in the early 1970s, then into an antiques shop in 1993 and finally into a homewares shop in 2015.
