= UTC Central Bedfordshire =

UTC Bedfordshire

Location
- Parkside Drive; Houghton Regis, Bedfordshire, LU5 5PY; England; 51°54′50″N 0°30′10″W

Information
- Type: University Technical College
- Established: 2012
- Closed: 2016
- Department for Education URN: 138199 Tables
- Ofsted: Reports
- Principal: Lesley Glover
- Age: 13 to 18

UTC Central Bedfordshire was a University Technical College (UTC) in Houghton Regis, Bedfordshire, England. The college opened in September 2012 and specialised in education for future engineers, product and games designers. It closed in August 2016.

== Location ==
UTC Central Bedfordshire was housed at the Kingsland campus in Houghton Regis. The building used by the college had undergone a refurbishment to provide engineering and design facilities.

== Curriculum ==
UTC Central Bedfordshire specialised in product design, games design and engineering. Students aged 13 to 16 studied GCSEs alongside technical qualifications which included practical learning, work related projects and opportunities for enterprise.

The UTC's sixth form students had the option to specialise in engineering, games design or product design. These qualifications led on to higher education, apprenticeships or work placements. The UTC gave its students access to industry equipment and specialist facilities, and enabled them to work with employers on real workplace projects.

== Sponsors ==
In 2014, Bedford College was appointed as sponsor of UTC Central Bedfordshire. Bedford College has won the Beacon Award for its work with schools and has been judged by Ofsted to be ‘outstanding’ for pre-16 education in two consecutive inspections.

The University of Bedfordshire was also a sponsor.

== Closure ==
The UTC closed in August 2016 after failing to attract sufficient numbers of pupils. Staff transferred to Bedford College, and students completed their courses elsewhere on the same site.
