= Wilstead =

Village in Bedfordshire, England

Coordinates: 52.0666°N 0.4333°W

- Location within Bedfordshire
- Population: 3,270 (2011 Census including Herrings Green and Wixams )
- OS grid reference: TL073794
- Civil parish: Wilshamstead
- Unitary authority: Bedford
- Ceremonial county: Bedfordshire
- Region: East
- Country: England
- Sovereign state: United Kingdom
- Post town: BEDFORD
- Postcode district: MK45
- Dialling code: 01234
- Police: Bedfordshire
- Fire: Bedfordshire
- Ambulance: East of England
- UK Parliament: Mid Bedfordshire

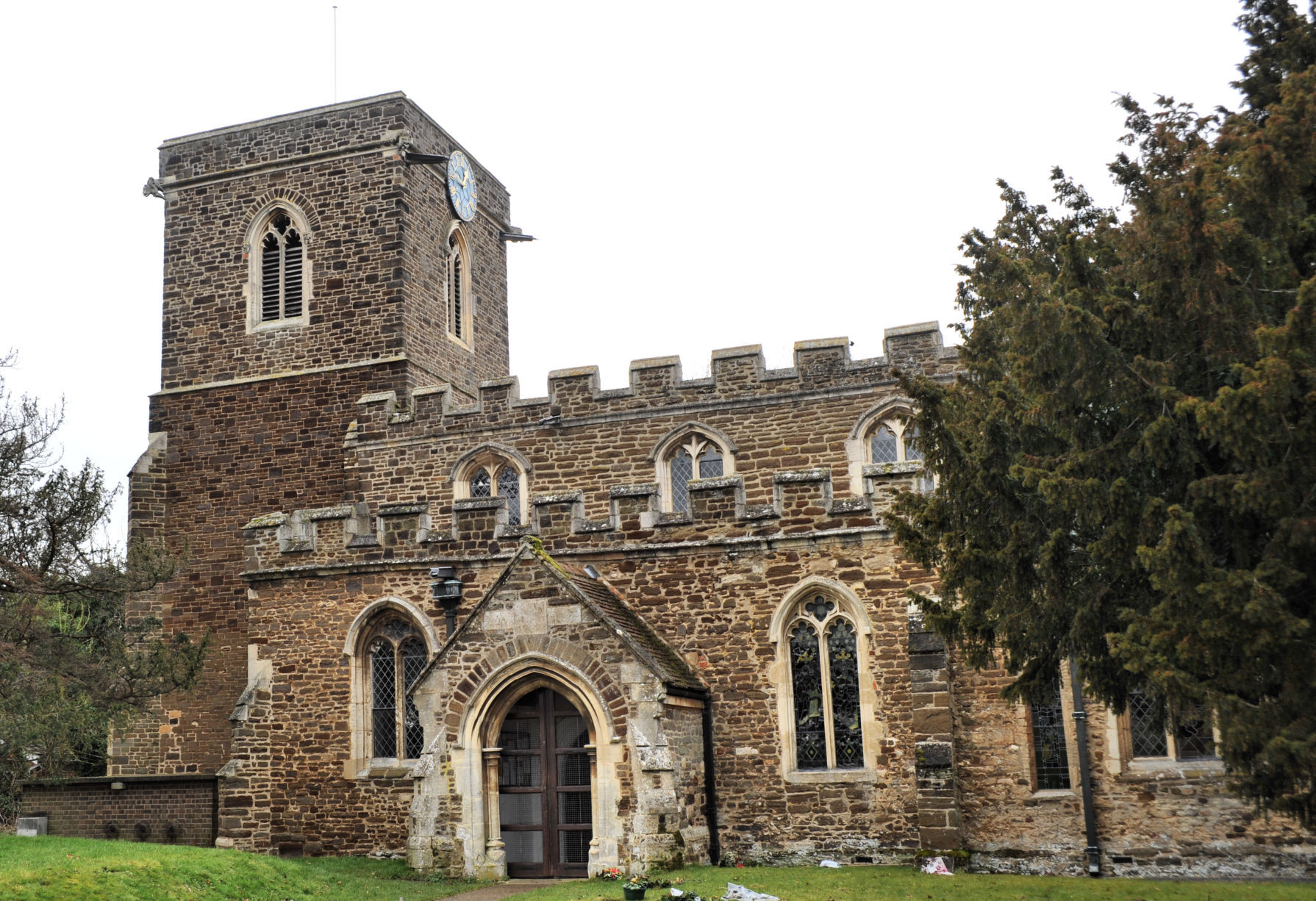
Wilstead All Saints Church

Wilstead is a village and civil parish in Bedfordshire, England, just off the A6 Bedford to Luton road, about five miles south of Bedford town centre, and within the Borough of Bedford. The name of the village has been spelled in many different ways, including Wilshamstead and Wylhamstead. Wilstead is now the usual name of the village, but the civil parish is named Wilshamstead. The council estimated the population of the parish at 2,550 in 2005. Most of the inhabitants live in the main village, but some live in other hamlets and isolated houses.

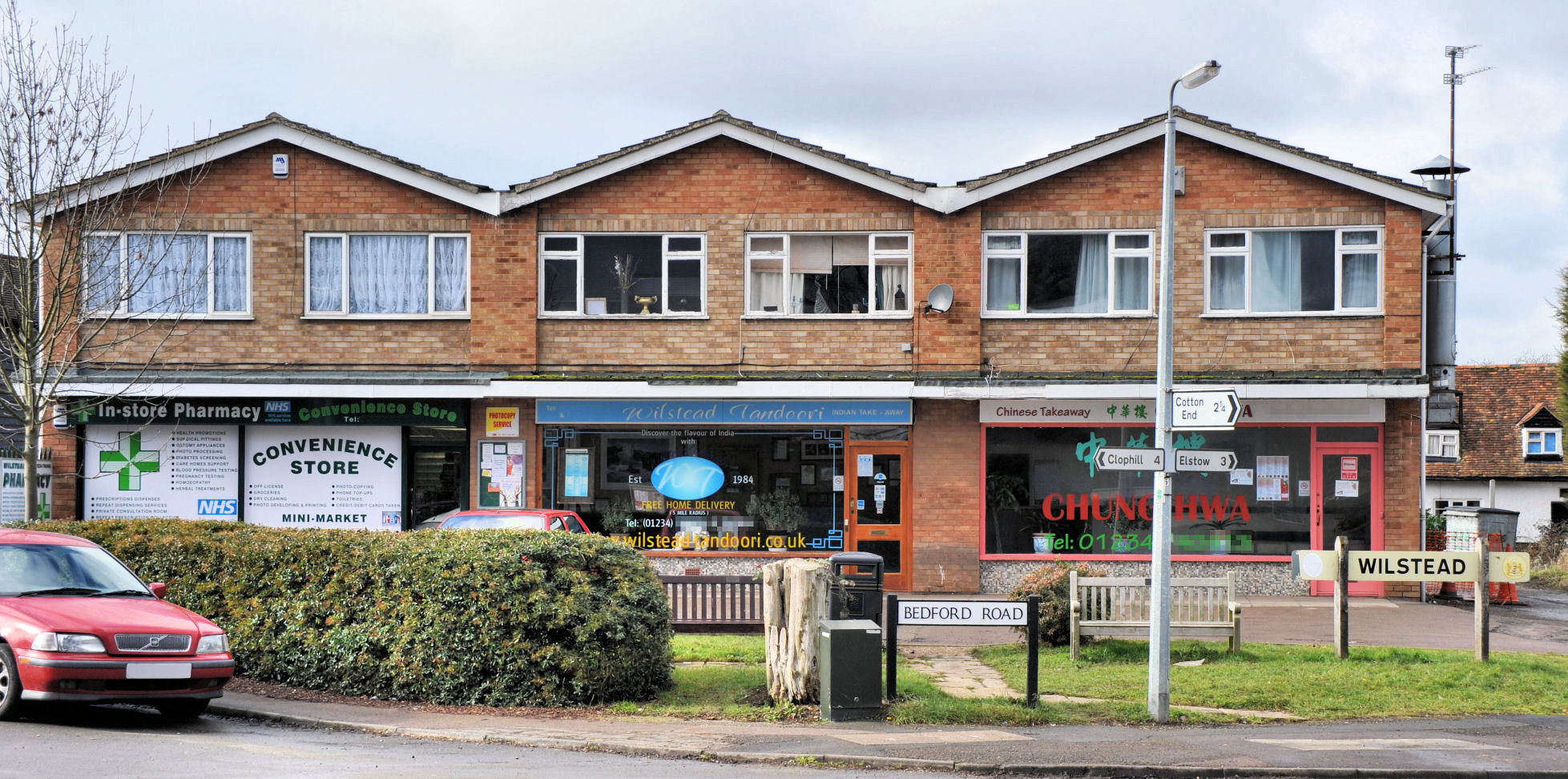
Wilstead shops - a convenience store & pharmacy, Indian takeaway and Chinese takeaway. Two pubs - The Woolpack and The Red Lion are close by

Near the centre of the village are a small shop that incorporates a sub post office with a sorting office, two pubs, a pharmacy/convenience store, an Indian takeaway, a Chinese takeaway and a small used car sales outlet. Wilstead Primary School is located in Cotton End Road, as is the village hall, a modern building. The village also has a pre-school and two churches. Many allotments are close to the village playing fields. Playgrounds are located next to the primary school, off Long Meadow Drive. The Wilstead Jubilee Centre and Multi Use Games Area are in Jubilee Way, and a lawn bowls club is nearby.

On the eastern edge of the village towards the A600 road is the Herrings Green Activity Farm & Bird of Prey Centre.

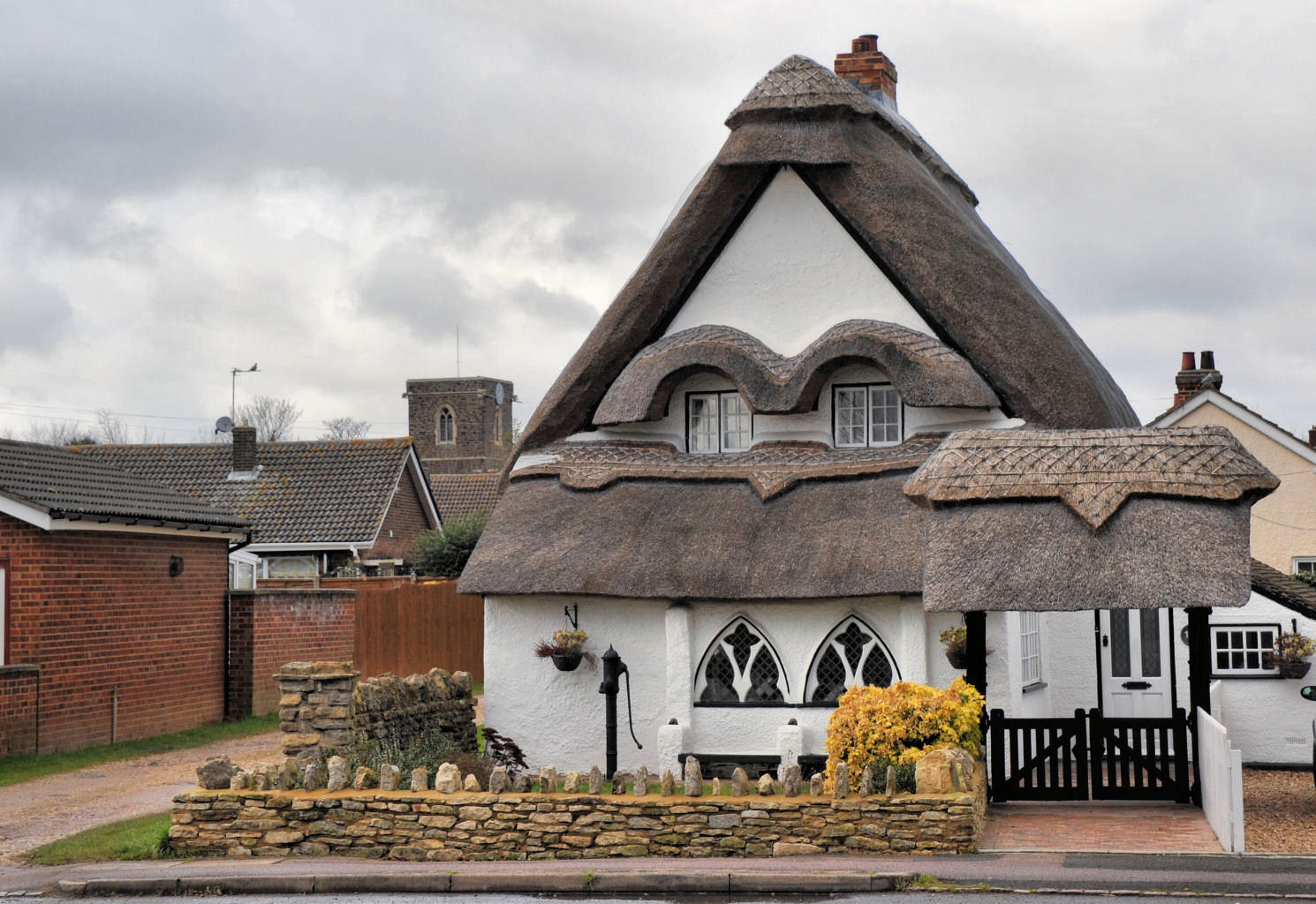
A thatched cottage in Wilstead, with the tower of All Saints Church visible in the background

Housing types include traditional farms, older houses (including thatched cottages and several listed buildings) and more modern, estate-type housing. Dwellings on the estate are generally of a more spacious character than the most modern developments. There is also a mobile home park called Briar Bank Park on the southern end of the village.

On the other (Western) side of the A6 is a large development of new, high density housing called Wixams. The new town is being developed in phases, with the first phase (Lakeview) originally located in the Wilshamstead civil parish, however a new Wixams civil parish was created for the area in 2015.

The yearly "Wilstead Ball" takes place the first Saturday of July and is a formal black tie and ball gown event. Taking place in a marquee in the grounds of one of the larger houses in the village, the money made from the event is normally allocated to a charity of the organisers preference. In recent years the event has sold out within days of the tickets sales being announced.
