= Bedford College, Bedford =

Coordinates: 52.13315°N 0.46726°W

Bedford College
- Logo of the college

Location
- Cauldwell Street; Bedford, Bedfordshire, MK42 9AH; England

Information
- Type: Further education
- Established: 19 June 1959
- Department for Education URN: 130597 Tables
- Head teacher: Yiannis Koursis
- Gender: Coeducational
- Website: www.bedford.ac.uk

Bedford College is a further education college located in Bedford, Bedfordshire, England. It is the principal further education provider in the Borough of Bedford.

== History ==
Further Education courses have been provided on Bedford College's Cauldwell Street campus under some name since World War II, although its roots can be traced to the founding of Bedford Training College for Teachers in 1882. Following construction of the college's six-storey tower block, opened on 19 June 1959, the college became known as Mander College of Further Education. The college was named after Sir Frederick Mander, who was Chairman of Bedfordshire County Council at the time of the tower's construction. The tower was erected at a cost of £282,510, plus £4,085 for external works.

In 1976 the college combined with two teacher training institutions to form the split-site Bedford College of Higher Education. The college remained in this form until 1992, when Further Education colleges achieved independent status from local education authorities. Bedford College was formed as a Further Education Institute to concentrate on provision within this sector, remaining at the Cauldwell Street campus. The Higher Education areas of the college separated in 1994 to become the Bedford campus of the De Montfort University, but later merged with the University of Luton to form the University of Bedfordshire. Bedford College retains some Higher Education provision, and provides a number of foundation degrees and select teaching qualifications in association with the University of Bedfordshire.

In January 2008 it was announced that Bedford College (with the Harpur Trust) intended to sponsor John Bunyan Upper School (a state comprehensive school in Bedford) thereby turning the school into an academy. This was confirmed by Bedfordshire County Council the following June. Bedford Academy opened in September 2010.

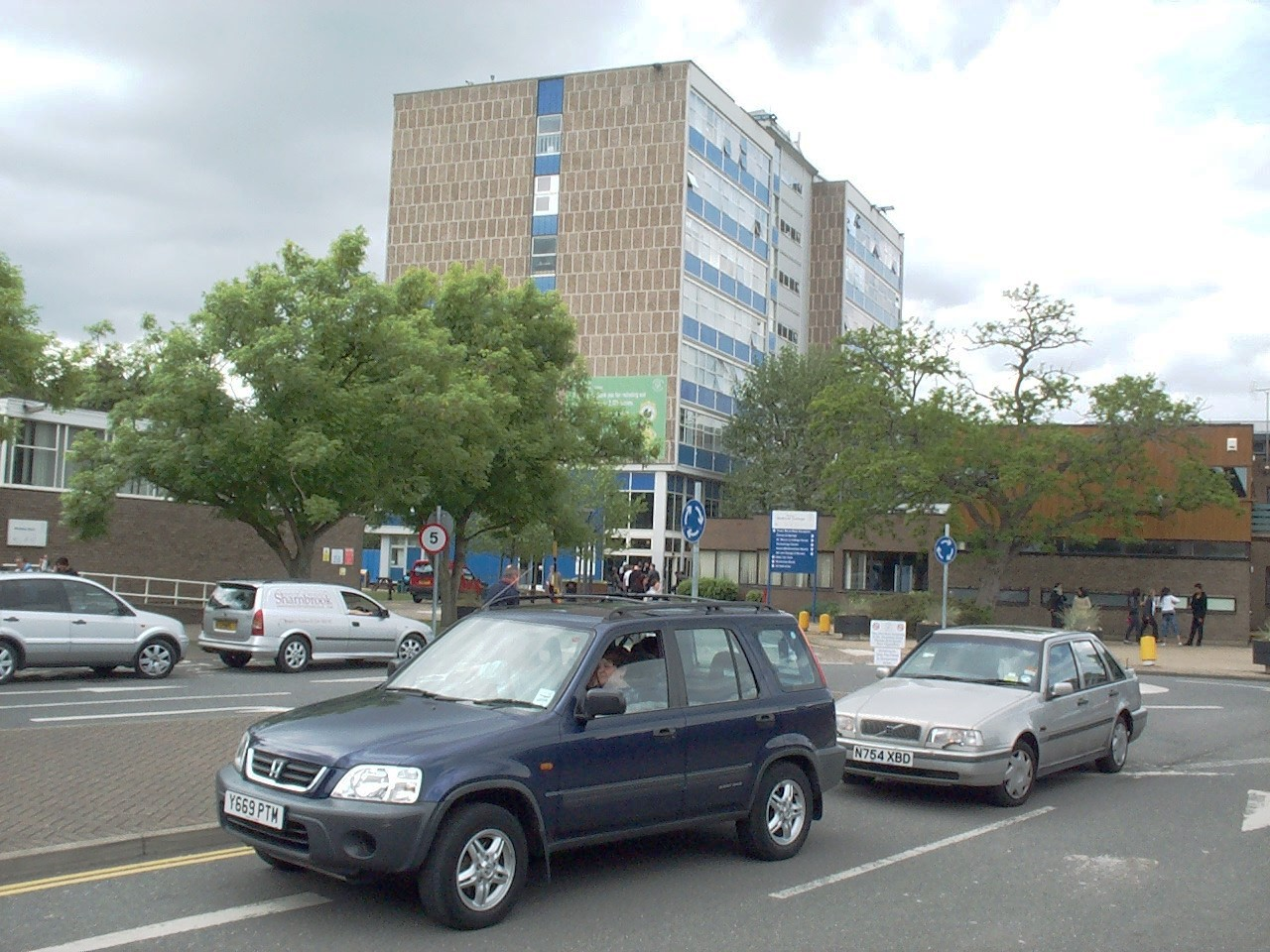
Bedford College main campus entrance

In July 2009, the college was formally awarded Beacon Status by the Department for Business, Innovation and Skills. The status means that Bedford College has been recognised as one of the best further education colleges in the United Kingdom.

In August 2009, it was announced that Shuttleworth College had become part of Bedford College. Shuttleworth College had previously been part of Writtle College.

In September 2012, Bedford College leased the site of the former Bedford High School for a campus in the north of Bedford town centre. Bedford High School closed over the summer of 2012. The college bought the old main school buildings, Trinity Church, and the Sports and Performing Arts (SPA) complex from owners, the Harpur Trust in March 2014. The Bedford Sixth Form occupies the campus (Bedford College's branding of its sixth form provision). The SPA complex became Trinity Arts & Leisure, managed by Bedford College Services Ltd.

In August 2017, Bedford College and Tresham College merged to become The Bedford College Group which includes Shuttleworth College, and The Bedford Sixth Form, as well as campuses in Wellingborough, Kettering and Corby. The Corby campus opened in 2023.

== Bedford College today ==
Bedford College offers a range of academic and vocational qualifications, apprenticeship, access to higher education courses, higher education qualifications and foundation education programmes.

The areas of study include –

- Art, Design & Media Studies
- Business & Professional studies
- Care, Childcare & Counselling
- Computing
- Construction & Building Services
- Engineering
- English for Speakers of Other Languages
- Floristry
- Hair, Beauty & Holistic therapies
- Hospitality & Catering
- Languages
- Motor vehicles
- Performing Arts
- Public services
- Sciences
- Sport
- Teacher training
- Travel & Tourism

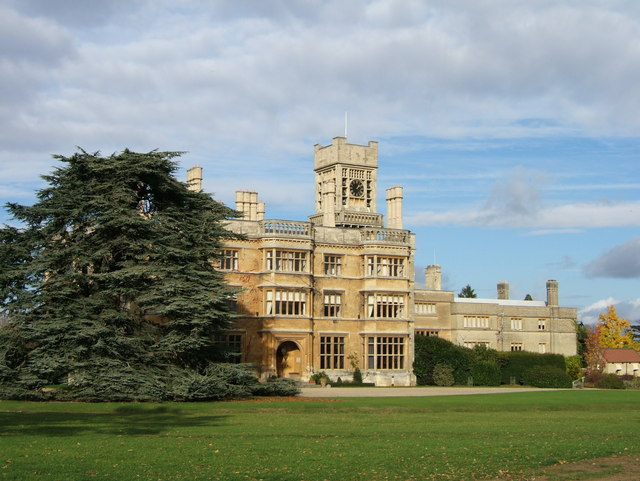
Shuttleworth College is part of Bedford College

=== The Bedford Sixth Form ===
The Bedford Sixth Form is a sixth form centre operated by Bedford College on the site of the former Bedford High School. Courses offered include GCSEs, A Levels and BTECs.

=== Shuttleworth College ===
Shuttleworth College located in Old Warden, Central Bedfordshire is operated by Bedford College. Shuttleworth College mainly provides courses and training related to agriculture and the natural environment.

=== Learning centres ===
Bedford College also operates four 'Learning Centres' located in the town centres of Bedford, Milton Keynes, Luton and Rushden which offer IT skills and courses.

=== Bedford College Academies Trust ===
Bedford College formed Bedford College Academies Trust in 2013.

The Trust was the initial sponsor of Bedford Academy, located in the Kingsbrook area of Bedford, along with the Harpur Trust.

In April 2014, Bedford College became a new sponsor of UTC Central Bedfordshire in Houghton Regis, and worked on building a new centre for students with the highest levels of need. This was at the request of the Department for Education after the UTC failed an inspection. However, the UTC closed in August 2016 after failing to attract a sufficient number of pupils.

In October 2014, it was announced that Hastingsbury Business & Enterprise College at Kempston would convert to an academy in partnership with Bedford College. The school was later renamed Kempston Academy, and after extending its lower age range in 2017 is now a secondary school.

Today the trust is the sponsor of Wixams Academy and Wixams Tree Primary, both located in Wixams.

== See also ==
- List of UCAS institutions
- List of universities in the United Kingdom
