= Woburn Cottage Hospital =

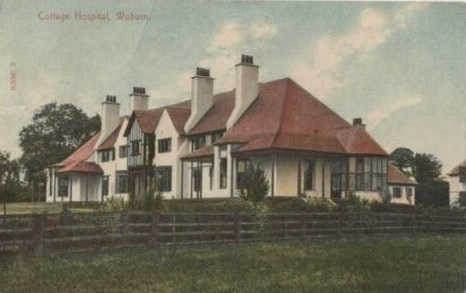
- Woburn Cottage Hospital

- Shown in Bedfordshire

Geography
- Location: Woburn, Bedfordshire, England
- Coordinates: 51.9859°N 0.6296°W

Organisation
- Type: Community

History
- Founded: 1898
- Closed: 1935

Links
- Lists: Hospitals in England

Woburn Cottage Hospital was a hospital in Woburn, Bedfordshire, England.

== History ==
Mary, the Duchess of Bedford (1865–1937) developed an interest in nursing whilst at school in Cheltenham, and in 1898 opened a cottage hospital at Woburn, the Bedford family country estate. Although the Duchess attended ‘a course of lectures at the London Hospital’ as part of her preparation to run the hospital, she does not appear to have undertaken formal training whilst there. During the Duchess's attendance at The London Hospital she got to know Sydney Holland, the hospital chairman, who reputedly ‘greatly stimulated her interest in hospital work.’ Subsequently, a series of London hospital trained nurses were matron of the hospital from 1898 until at least 1916. At any one time, up to three London Hospital trained nurses also worked there, often initially seconded from the hospital's Private Nursing Institution, which was run by Eva Lückes. During the First World War the Duchess turned it into a Military War Hospital. The hospital remained open until at least 1935.

== Notable staff ==
London Hospital trained matrons at Woburn Cottage Hospital:

- Kate Spencer, (1862–1933), 1899
- Alice Young, (1863–1944), 1900 – 1907 when she married.
- Frances W. Hickley, (1872–1949), 1907 until at least 1916.
