= John van Weenen =

British karateka

John Van Weenen MBE (born 26 August 1941, Enfield, Middlesex, England) is a 9th Dan karateka and humanitarian.

Van Weenen was graded to 1st Dan by Moss Hollis in 1966, (his diploma is reproduced in his auto biography 'In Funakoshi's Footsteps'), before travelling to Japan in 1967 to train at the invitation of Masutatsu Oyama at the Kyokushinkai Headquarters. However, he ultimately chose to train under Hirokazu Kanazawa and registered at the JKA Honbu in Tokyo.

He later founded the Traditional Association of Shotokan Karate (T.A.S.K.) in Bedford, Bedfordshire, whose guest instructors included Bob Poynton, Ticky Donovan and Sean Roberts.

Van Weenen is the executive director of Task Force Albania, a humanitarian organisation that has provided over £7 million in aid to Albania since the end of communism in the country in 1991. In 1993, he was the first person to receive the Order of Mother Teresa in Albania for his work, and this was re-presented by Mother Teresa herself in Calcutta. In 1999, he was awarded the MBE by Prince Charles and the citation read: "For services to the children of Albania".

Later that year he established the British Children's Library network, and in November the first library was inaugurated in Tirana, Albania's Capital. It was opened by Charles, Earl Spencer in honour of his late sister, Diana, Princess of Wales. A second library was opened in 2001, in Durrës, by Sir Norman Wisdom.

John Van Weenen stood for election in South West Bedfordshire for United Kingdom Independence Party (UKIP) in 2015, but was not elected.

== Bibliography ==
- Beginners' Guide to Shotokan Karate: Beginner to Black Belt (1983)
- Advanced Shotokan Karate Kata Volume 1 (1999)
- Task Force Albania: An Odyssey (1998)
- Task Force Albania - the Kosovo Connection (2001)
- In Funakoshi's Footsteps: The Autobiography of John Van Weenen 8th Dan (2004)
- Karate for Children: Vol 1 - Basics (2007)
- The Ten Pound Poms (2018)
- Walter Hagen's Caddie (2020)
