= Wixams =

Town in Bedfordshire, England

Coordinates: 52.0879°N 0.4738°W

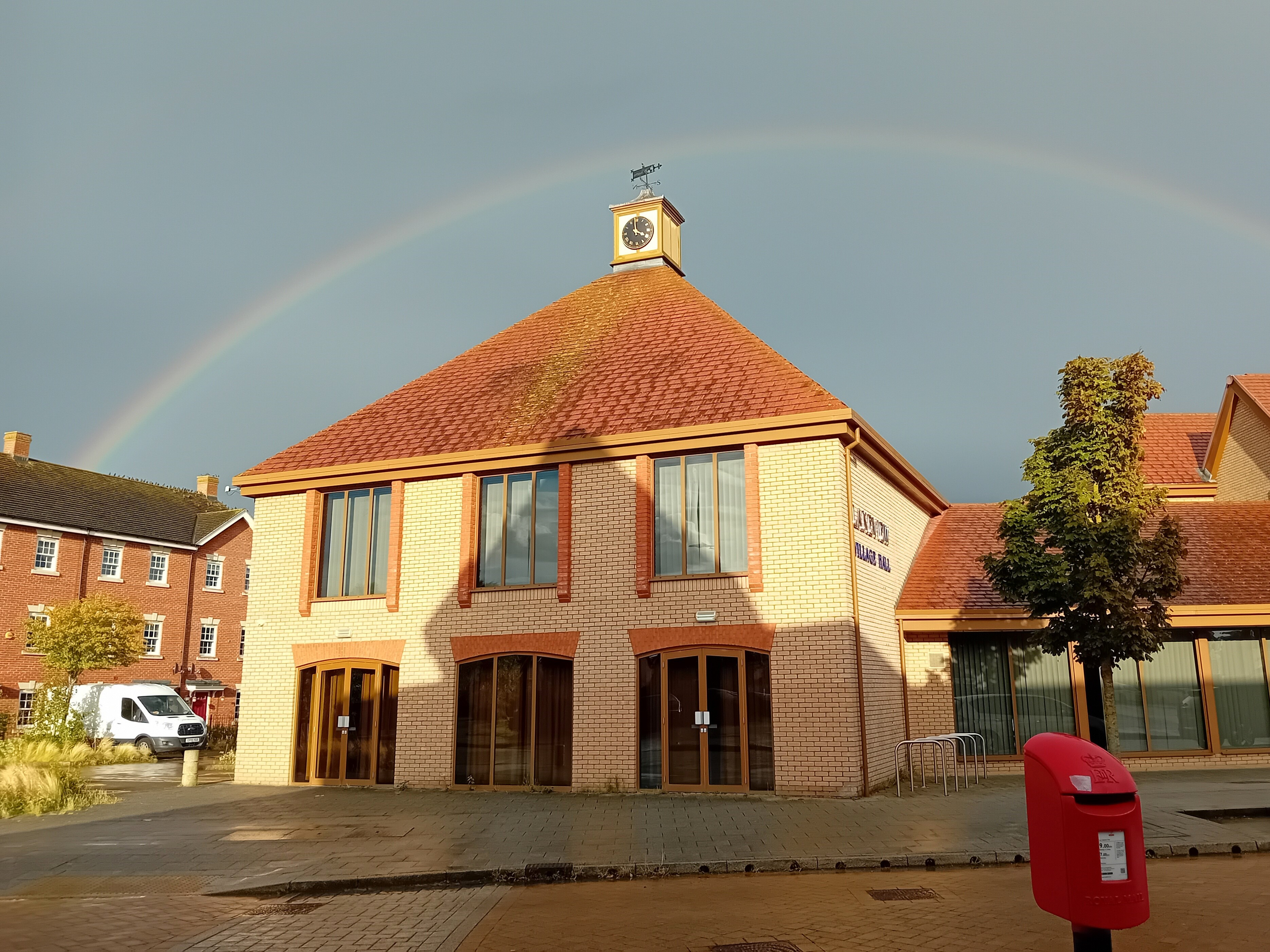
- Lakeview Village Hall

- Location within Bedfordshire
- Population: 4,669
- OS grid reference: TL046443
- Civil parish: Wixams
- Unitary authority: Bedford
- Ceremonial county: Bedfordshire
- Region: East
- Country: England
- Sovereign state: United Kingdom
- Post town: BEDFORD
- Postcode district: MK42
- Dialling code: 01234
- Police: Bedfordshire
- Fire: Bedfordshire
- Ambulance: East of England
- UK Parliament: Mid Bedfordshire

Wixams is a new town and civil parish located in Bedfordshire, England, which has been under construction since early 2007. It is expected to become the third largest settlement in the Borough of Bedford after Bedford itself and Kempston, and one of the largest new settlements founded in England since the British new towns movement of the first twenty five years after World War II.

Part of the site is in Central Bedfordshire. At the 2011 Census the population of the new town was included in the civil parish of Wilstead.

== History ==
The 750 acre (3 km²) brownfield site for the Wixams development is located just to the south of Bedford, and was formerly known as the Elstow Storage Depot; and in World War II, as ROF Elstow. The provisional name of the development during the early planning stages was Elstow Garden Villages. Elstow is a nearby village famous for its association with John Bunyan. The name "Wixams" derives from Wixamtree, an ancient hundred near to where the new town is situated. It is in the ancient hundred of Redbournestoke.

Wixams is planned to ultimately consist of four "villages", each with its own centre, built around a town centre. It is expected to have 4,500 homes, and is likely to provide housing capacity for people who work in Bedford, Milton Keynes and London. There is an intention to develop employment in Wixams itself.

Facilities which were originally planned to be constructed included:

- Over a million square feet of office space
- Three lower schools (ages 5–9), two middle schools (9–13) and one upper school (13–18)
- A primary healthcare centre
- A town park
- A range of shops
- A library
- A sports hall
- Over 300 acres (1.2 km^{2}) of parkland and public open space, featuring a series of lakes, water bodies and wetland areas. These are a legacy of the former open cast mineral extraction on the site, which lies within the Forest of Marston Vale, a brickmaking and gravel extraction area with many exhausted pits
- A large waste incinerator (capacity 0.5 million tons of waste per annum).

L&Q Estates (formerly Gallagher Estates) is the master development company for the whole of Wixams. The first area or village of development is known as Lakeview (previously Village One). Developers of Lakeview included Bloor Homes, Careys New Homes, Lagan Homes, Leech Homes, Miller Homes and Taylor Wimpey.

The first residents of Lakeview moved into the area in early 2009, but construction work has proceeded more slowly than forecast due to the late 2000s recession and the consequent state of the UK housing market. In August 2009, the first housing association properties were let to residents in Lakeview, with shared-ownership homes also becoming available.

The first lower school in Wixams, Lakeview Lower School opened in September 2009. Due to Bedford Borough Council moving from a Three-tier education system to two-tier, the school is now named 'Lakeview School' and is a primary school.

In late summer 2010, the Wixams Community Group was formed from residents who have moved to the new town. Between February 2011 and December 2015, the Reverend Tim Jackson served as the first ecumenical church minister. Funded by the Bedfordshire Ecumenical Committee, Tim represents the Anglican, Baptist, Methodist and United Reformed Christian denominations. However, there is no church building at present. After Tim's departure, church activities continue in the form of Sunday Worship, Messy Church and Little Stars.

Village Two (Willow Grove) is currently in development, with homes being constructed by Barratt Developments under both their Barratt Homes and David Wilson Homes brands. Village Four (Harrowden Green) is also in development. Village Three is planned to include the town centre and a rail link, offering a direct connection to Bedford and London. Infrastructure works carried out by ECL Civil Engineering includes in excess of 40,000m2 of new carriageways. Site preparation works for the Village Two and Village Three areas of Wixams commenced in early 2011.

In January 2012, Sophie, Countess of Wessex made an official visit to Wixams. The princess visited Lakeview Lower School, and met Dave Hodgson (Mayor of Bedford Borough), Andrew Slack (High Sheriff of Bedfordshire), Tony Gallagher (chairman of Gallagher Estates) as well as pupils and staff from the school.

Bedford Borough Council reported that over 600 homes were occupied in Lakeview by the end of 2012. A village hall has been constructed in Lakeview and officially opened in April 2013. The hall is managed by members of a local community trust and Company limited by guarantee.

In April 2018, plans were announced that would see the creation of 1,400 new jobs within Wixams. Planning permission was granted for B&M to construct a one million sq ft distribution centre; and for Aldi to construct a new 800,000 sq ft distribution centre. Both distribution centres were subsequently constructed on a site just north of the existing Wilstead Industrial Park.

A purpose built retirement village for the over-55s opened on a 6-acre site adjacent to Lakeview, within Wixams in 2019.

== Governance ==
Village One of the Wixams development (Lakeview) was previously part of the Wilshamstead civil parish, with residents entitled to vote in elections for Wilshamstead Parish Council. Wilshamstead is the parish name for the village of Wilstead, which is located on the other side of the A6 road. In April 2015, Wixams civil parish was created, with the first elections to the parish council on 7 May 2015. The as yet undeveloped parts of Wixams currently lie in the Stewartby and Houghton Conquest civil parishes.

Wixams forms part of the Mid Bedfordshire constituency, represented in the House of Commons. Since the 2024 United Kingdom general election, the Member of Parliament for the constituency is Blake Stephenson, who is a member of the Conservative Party.

== Transport ==
Wixams is adjacent to the A6 trunk road, part of which was diverted to a new section of dual carriageway in 2007/08 to make space for the development.

Wixams railway station is a new station under construction off Meadow Road, which will be an intermediate stop on the Midland Main Line between Bedford and Flitwick and served by up to four Thameslink trains per hour in each direction. The station was initially planned to be built by 2015, but wrangling over funding for the project meant that the date repeatedly slipped. Construction work finally started in December 2024 and the station is set to open late 2026.

Currently, Wixams is served by two major bus routes. The first is operated by Grant Palmer of Dunstable under the service number 44. The route runs from Bedford town centre through Wixams and also serves Wilstead, Clophill, Ampthill and Flitwick every hour. The other, numbered 81 and operated by Stagecoach East, runs from Bedford town centre through Wixams to Wilstead, Clophill, Silsoe, Barton-le-Clay and to Luton every hour.

There are no footpath or bridlepath rights of way leading out of Wixams into the surrounding countryside. Wixams is not connected to the surrounding network of countryside rights of way.

== Education ==
Wixams contains two primary schools and a secondary school.

The first primary school constructed for the settlement, Lakeview School, opened to pupils in September 2009. The architectural firm Mouchel designed the school, and Morgan Sindall constructed the building. The school has been controversial, as the first headteacher was appointed months before construction of the school began. The school had seven pupils on its roll when it opened.

In January 2012, Sophie, Countess of Wessex visited Lakeview School, unveiling a plaque.

Two new schools opened in Wixams in September 2017. One was the town's first secondary school, Wixams Academy, and the other a new primary school built adjacent to the secondary school, called Wixams Tree Primary.
