= Kingspan Off-Site =

Manufacturer of building materials

- Company type: Private
- Industry: Construction
- Founded: 1947 (as Ward Brothers)
- Headquarters: Sandy, UK
- Products: Timber and steel building systems
- Parent: Kingspan Group plc
- Website: www.kingspanoffsite.com

Kingspan Off-Site was a manufacturer of timber and steel building systems. It was a division of the Kingspan Group plc.

== History ==
=== Steel ===
Kingspan Off-Site’s range of steel products can be traced back to the Ward brothers’ construction company, set up in Yorkshire in 1947. Kingspan Group (based at Kingscourt, Ireland) acquired the Wards Business in 1997 and restructured it to become Kingspan Metl-con in 2004, specialising in off-site steel technologies. In 2007 Kingspan further increased its structural steel division with the acquisition of Banro, which was later rebranded as Kingspan Off-Site Profiles and Sections.

=== Timber frame ===
In 2001 Kingspan Off-Site purchased a German-based business, TEK Haus, which manufactured a Structural Insulated Panel Building System (SIPs). Incorporating SIPs technology, the Kingspan TEK Building System was launched in 2001. Kingspan Off-Site then acquired Century Homes, set up by the McCaughey brothers in Monaghan, in 2005. Kingspan Century continues to operate in Ireland offering a similar portfolio of solutions as Kingspan Off-Site in the UK. In 2006, Potton, a self-build specialist, and Pace Timber Frame also became part of the group as a result of further acquisitions. It was later rebranded as Kingspan Off-Site Profiles and Sections.

=== Façade ===
Kingspan Off-Site’s product range was extended in 2006 by the purchase of Fibrecon. Established in 2001, Fibrecon manufactures insulating wall panels consisting of a lightweight reinforced concrete face. In 2007 all business units, including Potton, Banro, Century, Pace, Fabrik and Off-Site merged to form the Kingspan Off-Site super division. It was later rebranded as Kingspan Off-Site Profiles and Sections.

External view of Kingspan Lighthouse

Another angle of external view

Internal view of Kingspan Lighthouse

Looking up from the ground at the balcony
