= Shuttleworth College, Bedfordshire =

Land-based further education college in Old Warden, Bedfordshire

Coordinates: 52.085°N 0.327°W

Shuttleworth College

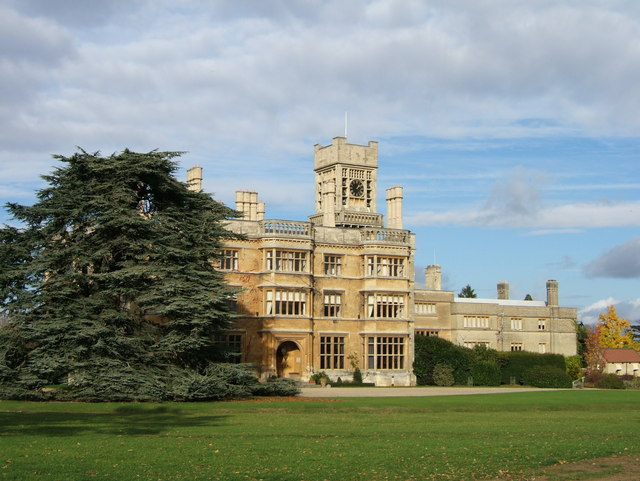
- The Mansion House at Shuttleworth College
- Old Warden, Old Warden Estate; Biggleswade, Bedfordshire, SG18 9DX, England

Information
- Type: Further education
- Established: 1944; 82 years ago
- Principal: Ian Pryce
- Campus type: Rural
- Affiliation: Bedford College Group
- Website: www.bedfordcollegegroup.ac.uk

Shuttleworth College is a specialist land-based further education college in Old Warden, Bedfordshire, United Kingdom. Shuttleworth College is a member of the Bedford College Group, and the Landex organisation.

== History ==
Shuttleworth College was founded in 1944 as part of the Richard Ormonde Shuttleworth Remembrance Trust. Richard Ormonde Shuttleworth, the owner of the Old Warden Estate in Bedfordshire, England was killed in 1940 while serving with the Royal Air Force. He had a keen interest in farming and estate management; after his death, his mother Dorothy Clotilda Shuttleworth established a trust in his memory. The two principal objectives of the Trust were the establishment of the college at Old Warden Park in Bedfordshire and the development of the Shuttleworth Collection – the unique museum of veteran aeroplanes, cars and other vehicles situated next to the park.

The college enrolled its first students in 1946 and soon established its place as a national centre for agricultural education. The existing buildings at Old Warden Park provided teaching and residential facilities in the early years of the college. From 1960 to 1990 the college campus was extended by the provision of specialist teaching facilities including lecture theatres, laboratories and a conference hall, plus machinery, livestock and agronomy teaching centres. Residential accommodation was also added for 150 students to supplement that available in existing rooms at the park.

In 1988 the college joined Cranfield University, at the time Cranfield Institute of Technology. In 1996, all operations of Shuttleworth College were formally merged with Cranfield's National College of Agricultural Engineering at Silsoe, Bedfordshire, and the Old Warden campus was closed. However, the Shuttleworth Trust re-established the college in 1997, in partnership with Writtle College. Since this time Shuttleworth College has generally been a provider of further education. In August 2009, Shuttleworth left Writtle College, and became part of Bedford College.

== Curriculum ==
Shuttleworth specialises in

- Agriculture
- Animal sciences
- Arboriculture and Forestry
- Aquaculture and Fisheries management
- Countryside Management
- Equine Care and management
- Floristry
- Horticulture and Gardening
- Land and Wildlife Management
- Outdoor education

Shuttleworth also offers courses in uniformed public services.
