= Bedford Sixth Form =

UK school providing GCSE and A-level qualifications

Coordinates: 52.13315°N 0.46726°W

The Bedford Sixth Form
- Logo of the Sixth Form
- Type: Sixth form
- Established: 2012
- Parent institution: Bedford College Group
- Principal: Kathryn Brindley-Edwards
- Location: Bedford, Bedfordshire; England
- Colours: Purple and blue
- Website: www.bedfordsixthform.ac.uk

The Bedford Sixth Form (BSF or TBSF) is a state sixth form located in the centre of Bedford, Bedfordshire, England. It is the only institution in Bedford solely dedicated to sixth form choices and, unlike most other sixth forms in England, it is not part of a secondary school. The institution offers a range of GCSEs, A-Levels and Technical Diplomas to 16- to 18-year-olds.

== History ==
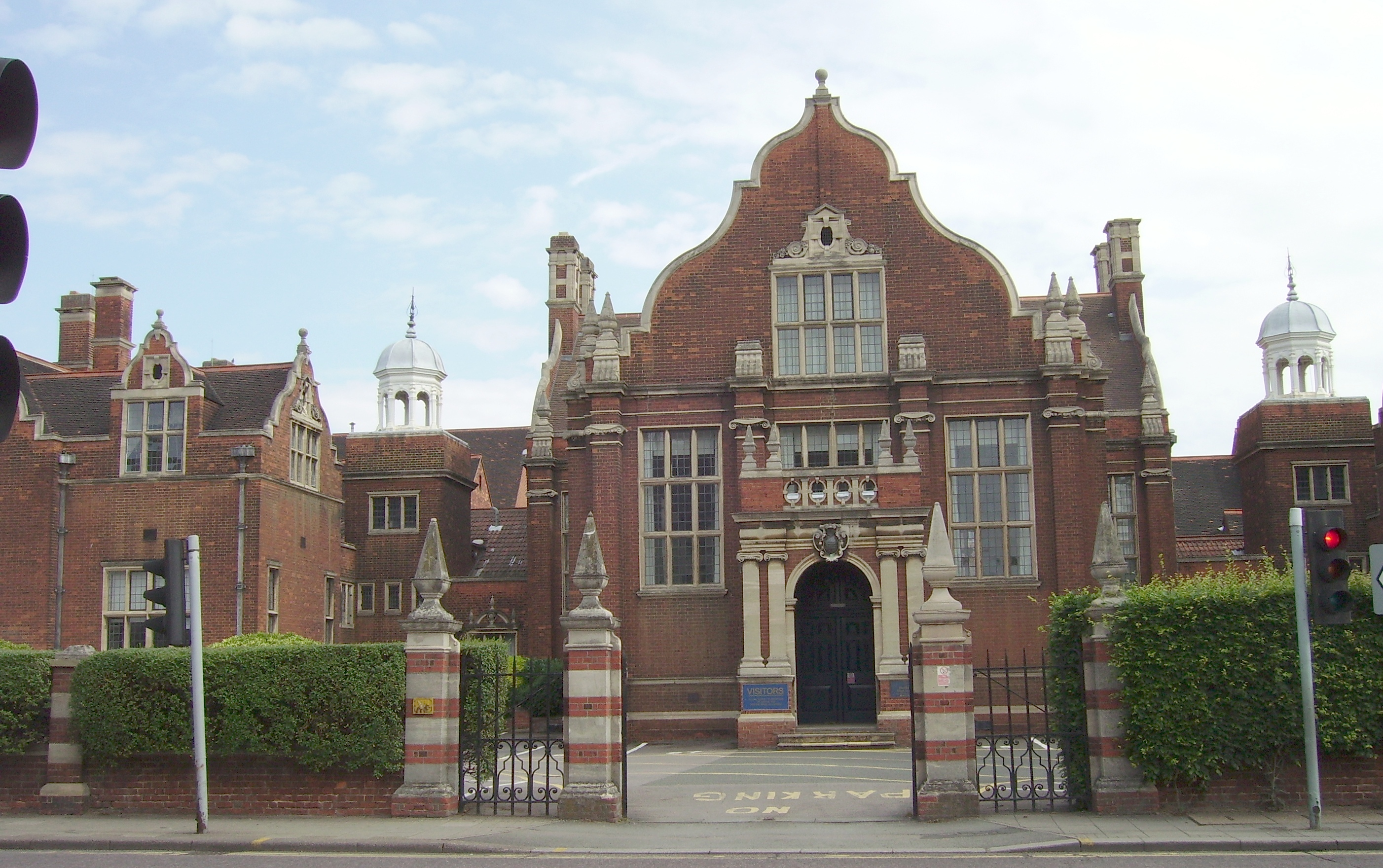
The High School in 2011, now repurposed as the Bedford Sixth Form

The Bedford Sixth Form opened in September 2012. Part of Bedford College, the sixth form centre derives from the college's existing sixth form provision. A-Levels and Technical Diplomas were previously offered at the college's main site.

In the summer of 2012, Bedford College leased the old Bedford High School site on Bromham Road, after the school had closed. The Bedford Sixth Form has operated from the site ever since.

In March 2014, Bedford College purchased the site including the old main school buildings, Trinity Church, and the Sports and Performing Arts (SPA) complex from owners, the Harpur Trust.

== Academic performance ==
Ofsted's 2014 inspection of Bedford College resulted in a 'good with outstanding features' rating.

In August 2014 the first students to complete a two-year programme at The Bedford Sixth Form received their A-Level results, receiving a 100% pass rate in 24 out of 30 A-Level subjects.

A-Level results for the 2017/18 academic year consisted of an aggregate 99% pass rate (in 30 subjects), with 73% of students receiving A*-C.

More recently, A-Level results during the 2019/20 academic year consisted of an aggregate 99% pass rate (in 31 subjects), with 55% of students receiving A*-B.

== Contemporary operations ==
As of 2022 The Bedford Sixth Form offers 37 subjects (A-Levels and Diplomas), including four modern-day languages (German, French, Spanish and Italian) as well as Latin.

Along with these 37 subjects they offer a range of extra-curricular activities called 'enhancements'. Students can partake in up to 6 of these enhancements during their time at the institution (3 per term, over 2 academic years). Enhancements are varied in nature - aligning either directly to an academic subject or something of solely personal interest.

As well as enhancements, work experience is seen as "a core part of all programmes at The Bedford Sixth Form" and a week is allocated during each academic year where students will be expected undertake a work placement for 30 hours.

Students at The Bedford Sixth Form can attend talks and go on field trips which vary based on the subjects they study. For example, a tour and talk at the Houses of Parliament for Government & Politics students, trips to Rome and Athens for Philosophy & Classical Civilisation students and a trip to New York City for Media & Film Studies students.
