= Greensand Ridge Walk =

40-mile footpath in Bedfordshire, England

Coordinates: 51.916373°N 0.670391°W

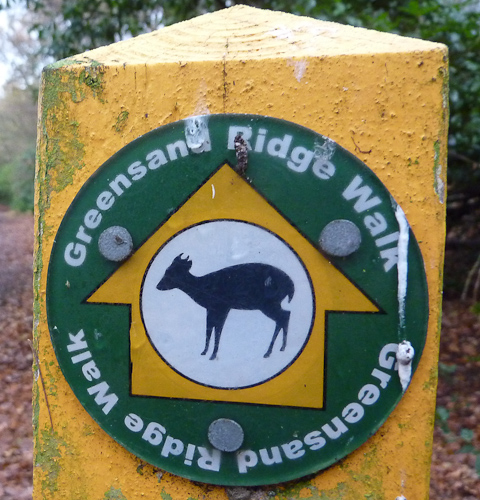
- Waymarker denoting the route of the Greensand Ridge Walk
- Length: 64 km (40 mi)
- Location: South Central England, United Kingdom
- Trailheads: Gamlingay, Cambridgeshire; Leighton Buzzard, Bedfordshire
- Use: Hiking
- Difficulty: Easy
- Season: All year

The Greensand Ridge Walk is a long-distance walk of 40 miles (64 km) that traverses the county of Bedfordshire in England, with brief sections in the neighbouring counties of Cambridgeshire and Buckinghamshire. Its southern endpoint is at Leighton Buzzard and the route runs north-east to finish at Gamlingay. As can be inferred from the name, the walk follows the Bedfordshire Greensand Ridge (not to be confused with the Greensand Way, the greensand ridge that can be found in Surrey, Sussex and Kent).

The waymarker for the route employs a silhouette of the muntjac, a common sight in the vicinity of the village of Woburn, through which the walk passes.
