= Bedfordshire =

County of England

- Ceremonial county
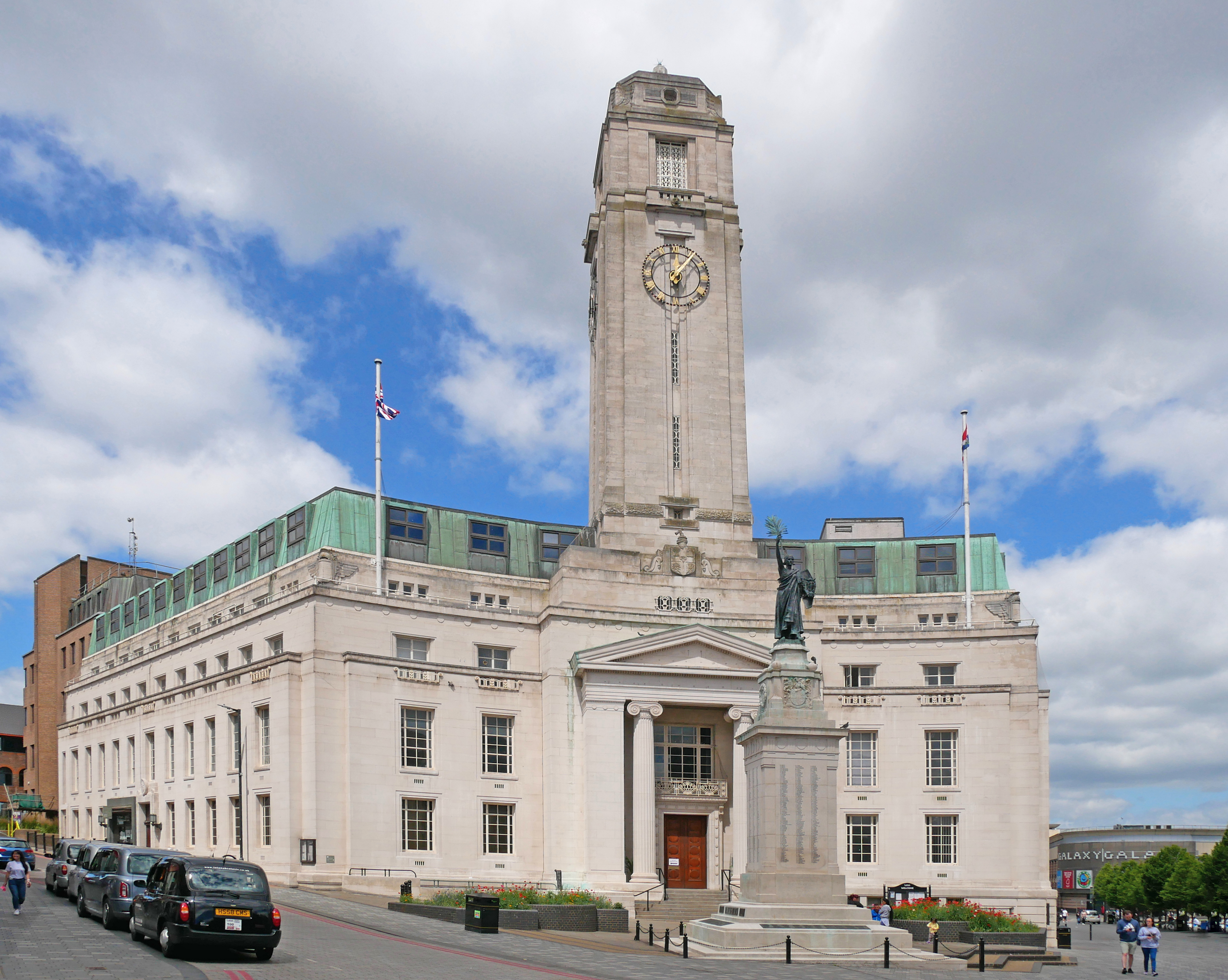
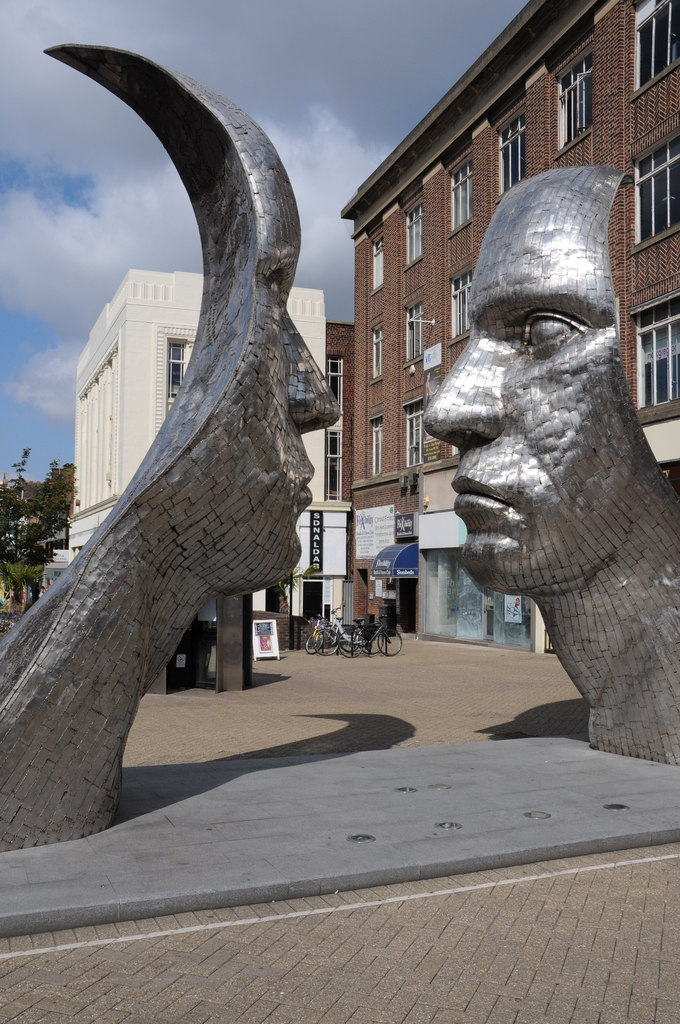
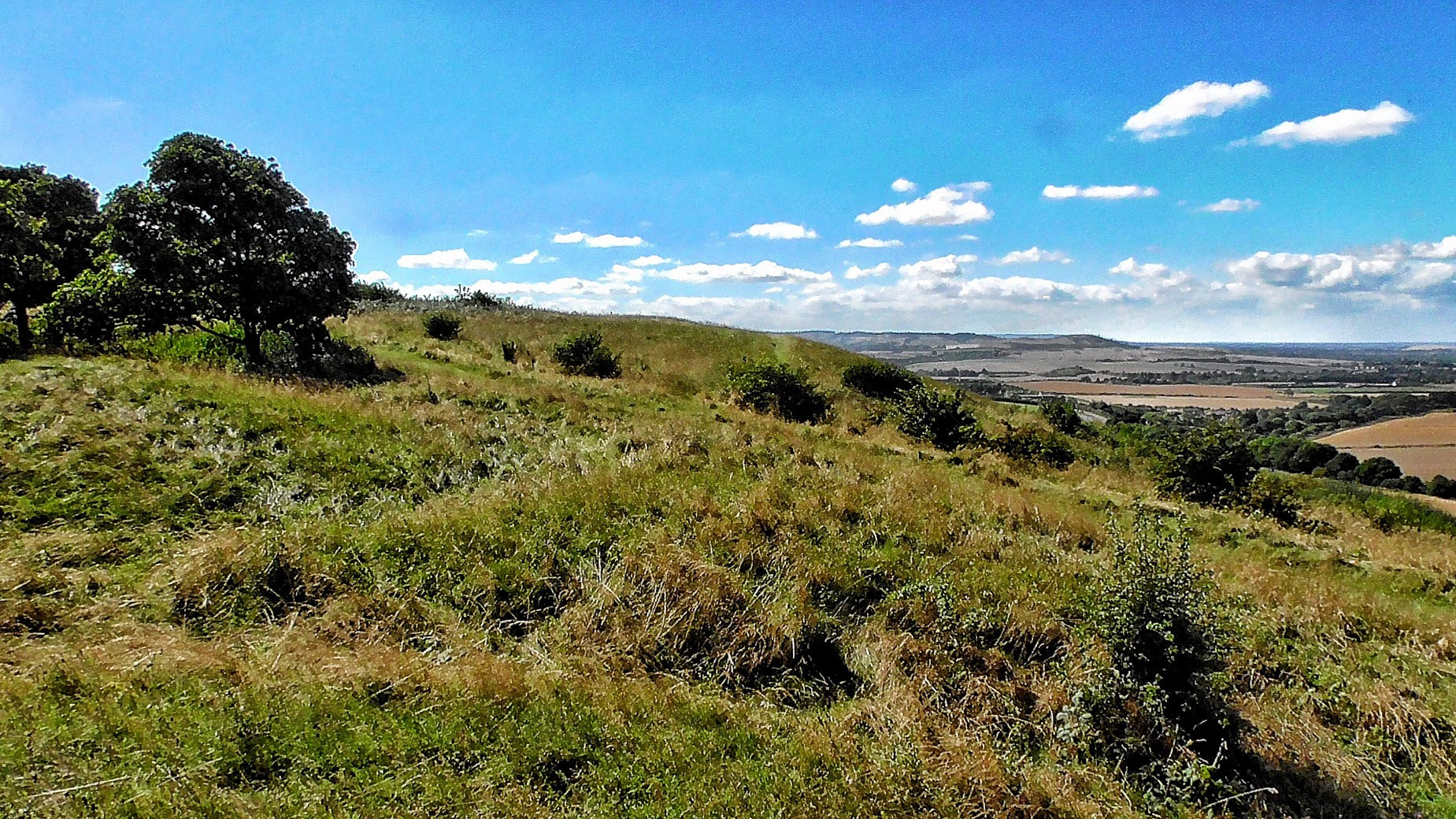
- Clockwise from top left: Luton Town Hall; Reflections of Bedford in Bedford; Dunstable Downs

- Bedfordshire shown within England
- Coordinates: 52°05′N 0°25′W
- Sovereign state: United Kingdom
- Constituent country: England
- Region: East
- Established: Ancient
- Time zone: UTC+0 (GMT)
  - Summer (DST): UTC+1 (BST)
- UK Parliament: 7 MPs
- Police: Bedfordshire Police
- Largest town: Luton
- Ceremonial county
- Lord Lieutenant: Susan Lousada
- High Sheriff: Ismail Anilmis
- Area: 1,235 km^{2} (477 sq mi)
  - Rank: 41st of 48
- Population (2024): 749,943
  - Rank: 36th of 48
  - Density: 607/km^{2} (1,570/sq mi)
- Districts
- Districts of Bedfordshire; Unitary
- Districts: 1. Bedford; 2. Central Bedfordshire; 3. Luton

Bedfordshire (/ˈbɛdfərdʃɪər, -ʃər/; abbreviated Beds) is a ceremonial county in the East of England. It is bordered by Northamptonshire to the north, Cambridgeshire to the north-east, Hertfordshire to the south and south-east, and Buckinghamshire to the west. The largest settlement is Luton.

The county has an area of 1,235 km^{2} (477 sq mi) and had an estimated population of 749,943 in 2024. Luton is in the south of the county, and Dunstable neighbours it to the west. Leighton Buzzard is in the south-west, and Bedford in the centre-north. For local government purposes Bedfordshire comprises three unitary authority areas: Bedford, Central Bedfordshire, and Luton.

The centre of Bedfordshire is a gently undulating clay plateau, out of which rises a ridge of greensand that runs south-west to north-east and which has a distinct north-facing escarpment. The south of the county, around Luton, contains part of the chalk Chiltern Hills, and the north of the county part of a limestone ridge that runs between Milton Keynes and Northampton. The county's highest point is at 243 m (797 ft) on the Dunstable Downs, which are part of the Chilterns. The River Great Ouse flows through Bedfordshire, entering upstream of Harrold in the north-west and flowing in a circuitous but overall southerly direction to Bedford before turning north-east to exit the county in the east, upstream of St Neots in Cambridgeshire.

== History ==
The first recorded use of the name in 1011 was "Bedanfordscir", meaning the shire or county of Bedford, which itself means "Beda's ford" (river crossing).

Bedfordshire was historically divided into nine hundreds: Barford, Biggleswade, Clifton, Flitt, Manshead, Redbornestoke, Stodden, Willey, Wixamtree, along with the liberty and the ancient borough of Bedford.

There have been several changes to the county boundary; for example, in 1897 Kensworth and part of Caddington were transferred from Hertfordshire to Bedfordshire.

== Geography ==
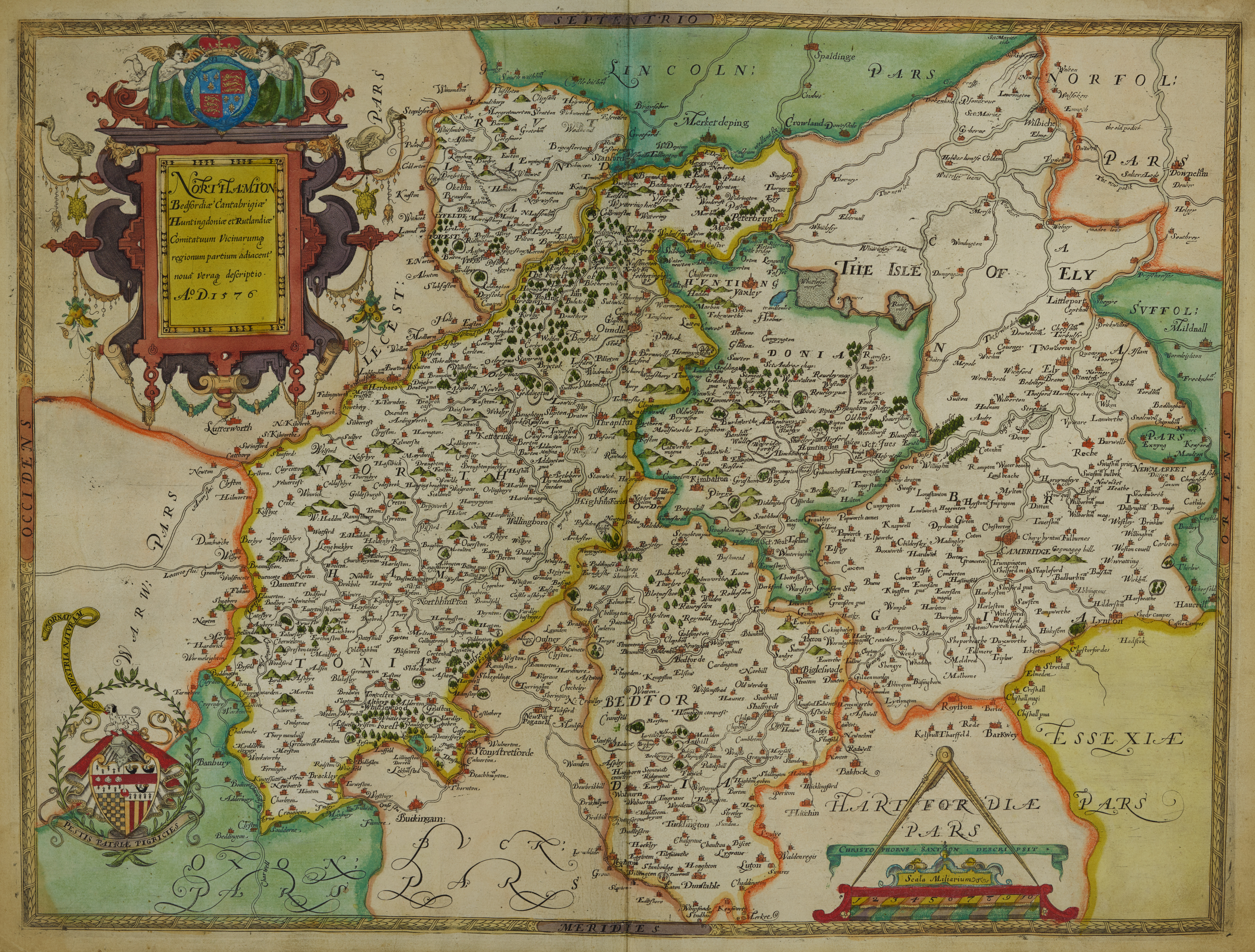
Hand-drawn map of Northampshire, Bedfordshire, Huntingdonshire, Cambridgeshire and Rutland by Christopher Saxton from 1576

The southern end of the county is on the chalk ridge known as the Chiltern Hills. The remainder forms part of the broad drainage basin of the River Great Ouse and its tributaries. Most of Bedfordshire's rocks are clays and sandstones from the Jurassic and Cretaceous periods, with some limestone. Local clay has been used for brick-making of Fletton-style bricks in the Marston Vale. Glacial erosion of chalk has left hard flint nodules deposited as gravel—these have been commercially extracted in the past at pits which are now lakes: at Priory Country Park, Wyboston and Felmersham. The Greensand Ridge is an escarpment across the county from near Leighton Buzzard to near Gamlingay in Cambridgeshire.

=== Climate ===
Bedfordshire, being situated in the east of England, has a relatively dry climate for the UK with regular but generally moderate rainfall. Average annual rainfall is 608.6 millimetres (23.96 in) at Bedford. October is the wettest month, with 65.3 millimetres (2.57 in), and March the driest, with 37.3 millimetres (1.47 in).

Although temperatures are usually moderate, the county has one of the largest absolute temperature ranges in the UK – of more than 60 °C (108 °F). Average temperatures in Bedford range from a low of 1.5 °C (34.7 °F) overnight in February to a high of 22.4 °C (72.3 °F) during the day in July. The highest official temperature recorded in Bedfordshire was 39.7 °C (103.5 °F) in 2022. The lowest official temperature recorded in Bedfordshire was −20.6 °C (−5.1 °F) in 1947.

== Politics ==
=== Police and Crime Commissioner ===
The Bedfordshire Police and Crime Commissioner is John Tizard, a member of the Labour Party.

=== Local government ===
For local government purposes, Bedfordshire is divided into three unitary authorities: the boroughs of Bedford and Luton, and the district of Central Bedfordshire. Healthcare in the county is dealt with by a single Clinical Commission Group (CCG), which serves all three local authorities in the county, alongside the City of Milton Keynes in Buckinghamshire.

=== Emergency services ===
Policing and fire and rescue services continue to be provided on a county-wide basis, with Bedfordshire Police governed by the Bedfordshire Police and Crime Commissioner and Bedfordshire Fire and Rescue Service governed by a Fire Authority comprising members of the three councils. Ambulance Services are provided by the East of England Ambulance Service NHS Trust.

=== Parliamentary constituencies ===
For elections to the House of Commons, Bedfordshire is divided into seven constituencies, each returning a single Member of Parliament (MP):

Constituency	Member of Parliament
Bedford	Mohammad Yasin
Dunstable and Leighton Buzzard	Alex Mayer
Hitchin	Alistair Strathern
Luton North	Sarah Owen
Luton South and South Bedfordshire	Rachel Hopkins
Mid Bedfordshire	Blake Stephenson
North Bedfordshire	Richard Fuller

The present constituencies date from 1997. The boundaries were slightly modified for the 2010 general election.

== Economy ==
This is a chart of trend of regional gross value added of Bedfordshire at current basic prices published (pp. 240–253) by Office for National Statistics with figures in millions of British Pounds Sterling.

Year	Regional Gross Value Added	Agriculture	Industry	Services
1995	4,109	81	1,584	2,444
2000	4,716	53	1,296	3,367
2003	5,466	52	1,311	4,102

Bedfordshire is the location of a number of notable UK and international companies who have either headquarters or major bases in the county. Autoglass, Boxclever and Charles Wells Pubs are all based in Bedford, while the Kier Group and Kingspan Timber Solutions are based in Sandy, and Jordans Cereals are based in Biggleswade. EasyJet, Impellam, TUI Airways and Vauxhall Motors are all based in Luton, Whitbread is based in Houghton Regis and Costa Coffee is now based in Dunstable. UltraVision is based in Leighton Buzzard, while Moto Hospitality is based at Toddington service station.

== Culture ==
=== Food ===
The "Bedfordshire clanger" is a local dish consisting of a suet crust pastry filled with meat in one end and a fruit preserve in the other. It was traditionally a farm labourers' meal, designed so as to produce no waste as well as two separate meals.

Chocolate Toothpaste is another local delicacy. A chocolate tart, Chocolate Toothpaste consists of a gritty chocolate filling (said to resemble the texture of toothpaste) within a pastry tart, commonly finished with a swirl of whipped cream on top.

=== Flag ===
The flag designed to represent Bedfordshire

The flag of Bedfordshire is based on the banner of arms of the former Bedfordshire County Council.

== Visitor attractions ==
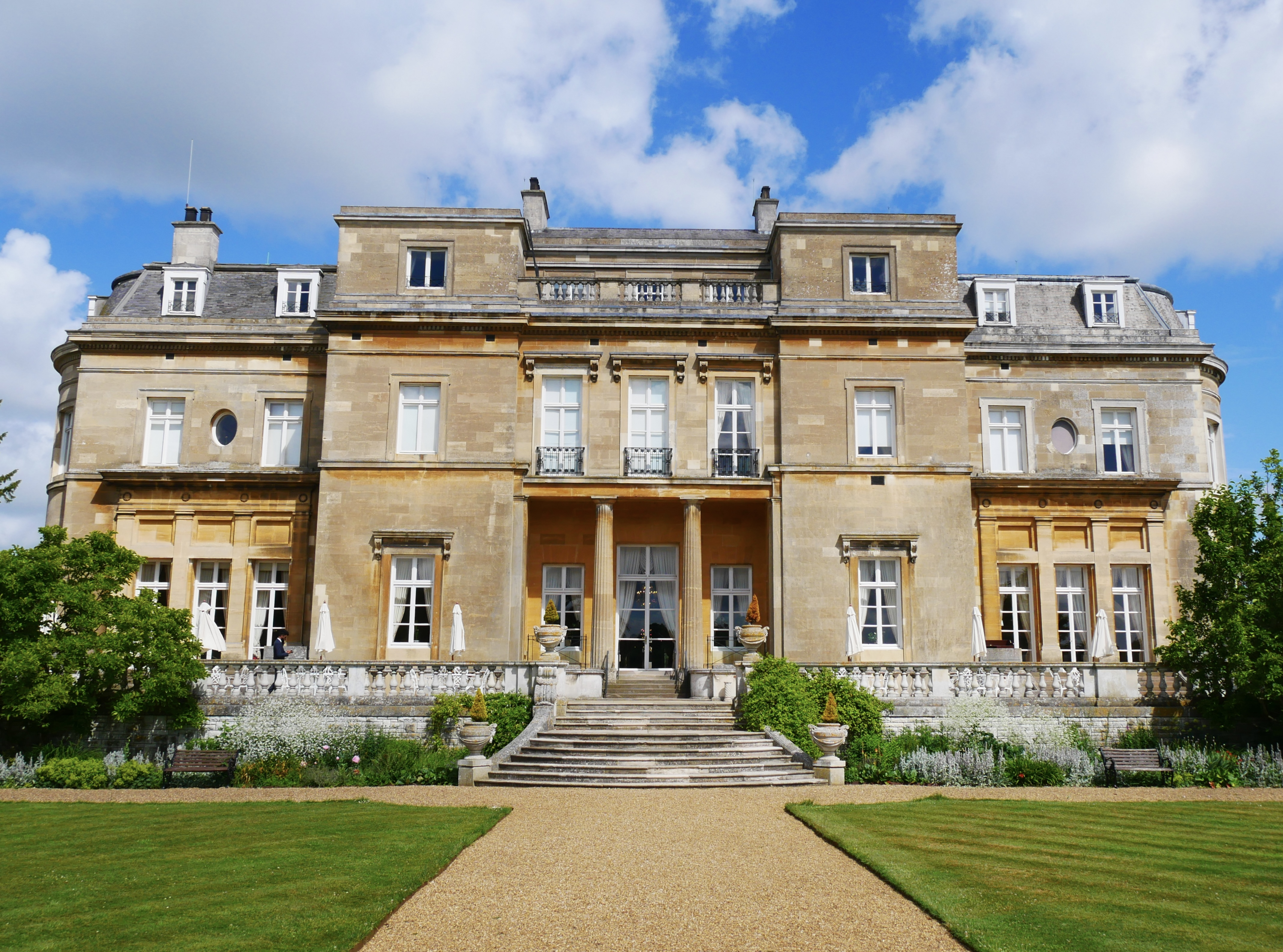
Luton Hoo

Key
	Abbey/Priory/Cathedral
Accessible open space	Accessible open space
	Amusement/Theme Park
	Castle
Country Park	Country Park
	English Heritage
	Forestry Commission
Heritage railway	Heritage railway
Historic house	Historic House
Places of Worship	Places of Worship
Museum (free) Museum	Museum (free/not free)
National Trust	National Trust
	Theatre
	Zoo

- Bedford Castle
- Bedford Corn Exchange
- Bushmead Priory
- Cecil Higgins Art Gallery & Bedford Museum
- Bedford Park
- Cardington (R101 hangar)
- Chicksands Priory
- Chiltern Hills
- De Grey Mausoleum
- Dunstable Downs
- Elstow Moot Hall
- Harrold-Odell Country Park
- Houghton House
- Leighton Buzzard Light Railway
- Luton Hoo
- Luton Museum & Art Gallery
- Marston Vale Community Forest
- Mossman Collection
- Priory Country Park
- RAF Henlow
- RSPB The Lodge, Sandy
- Someries Castle
- The Shuttleworth Collection
- St Paul's Church
- Stockwood Craft Museum
- Swiss Garden, Old Warden
- Wardown Park
- Waulud's Bank
- Whipsnade Wildlife Park
- Whipsnade Tree Cathedral
- Willington Dovecote & Stables
- Woburn Abbey
- Woburn Safari Park
- Woodside Farm and Wildfowl Park
- Wrest Park Gardens

== Transport ==
Bedfordshire lies on many of the main transport routes which link London to the Midlands, Northern England and the rest of the UK.

=== Roads ===
Two of England's six main trunk roads pass through Bedfordshire. The A1 London to Edinburgh road (the Great North Road) runs close by Biggleswade and Sandy, and Watling Street, the Roman road between London and Chester, passes through Dunstable. Until it was diverted in 2017, this was also the route of the A5 road between London and Holyhead. The Bedfordshire section of the A5 now runs from junction 11a of the M1 to rejoin Watling Street between Dunstable and Hockliffe, then continues on to cross the Buckinghamshire border at the City of Milton Keynes.

To these was added in 1959 the M1 motorway, running from London to Leeds. Running from junctions 10 to 13 in Bedfordshire, there are two junctions serving Luton (at the southern end), with another one serving Bedford and Milton Keynes (at the northern end). Between these lie two other junctions in the county; one connecting to the A5 and serving Dunstable, and the other serving the town of Flitwick. There is one motorway service station in the county: Toddington Services.

Former trunk roads, now local roads managed by the local highway authorities, include the A428 (Cambridge-Coventry) running east–west through Bedford Borough, and the A6 from Luton to Carlisle.

=== Railways ===
Three of England's main lines pass through Bedfordshire.

The West Coast Main Line has but a short section where it passes through the far west of the county, with one station at Leighton Buzzard served by West Midlands Trains to London Euston and Northampton.

The East Coast Main Line has stations at Arlesey, Biggleswade and Sandy, served by Great Northern services to King's Cross and Peterborough.

The Midland Main Line serves Luton, Luton Airport (via Luton DART link from the station at Luton Airport Parkway) and Bedford, with trains to many destinations operated by East Midlands Railway and Thameslink. Intermediate stations at Flitwick, Harlington and Leagrave are served by Thameslink.

There are London North Western rural services also running between Bedford and Bletchley along the Marston Vale Line.

=== Waterways ===
The River Great Ouse links Bedfordshire to the Fenland waterways. As of 2004 there are plans by the Bedford & Milton Keynes Waterway Trust to construct a canal linking the Great Ouse at Bedford to the Grand Union Canal at Milton Keynes, 14 miles (23 km) distant.

=== Air ===
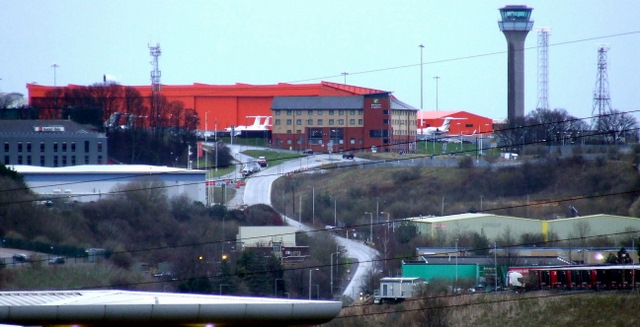
Luton Airport

Luton Airport (the fifth busiest in the United Kingdom) has flights to many UK, European, Middle Eastern and North African destinations, operated largely (but not exclusively) by low-cost airlines.

== Media ==
Local news is provided by BBC East and ITV Anglia from Cambridge, the southern part of the county such as Luton can also receive BBC London & ITV London meaning the area can get news and television programmes from Cambridge and London.

Local radio stations are BBC Three Counties Radio (broadcast from Dunstable), Heart East, Greatest Hits Radio Bucks, Beds and Herts (formerly Mix 96), BigglesFM (covering Biggleswade, Potton and Sandy), In2beats (Bedford) and Radio LaB (Luton).

== Settlements ==
The five largest settlements in Bedfordshire as of the 2021 UK census. (Sources used are as accurate as possible to the locality's boundaries, or the associated civil parish is used if one exists for the place in question.) – red.
Suburban settlements/new town type settlements, currently undergoing significant planned expansion in the county. Also of note is that Stewartby/Kempston Hardwick is the planned location of the upcoming Universal Studios Great Britain. – green.

== Education ==
The state education system for all of Bedfordshire used to be organised by Bedfordshire County Council. Unlike most of the United Kingdom, Bedfordshire County Council operated a three-tier education system arranged into lower, middle and upper schools, as recommended in the Plowden Report of 1967, although Luton continued to operate a two-tier system. The three-tier arrangement continued in the rest of the county, though in 2006 a vote was held with a view to moving to the two-tier model, but this was rejected.

After the 2009 structural changes to local government in England, Bedfordshire County Council was abolished, and its responsibilities for education were passed to Bedford Borough Council and Central Bedfordshire Council.

=== Bedford Borough ===
Bedford Borough Council voted in November 2009 to change to the two-tier model in its area. The change was due to be introduced over a five-year period and be completed in 2015. However, with the cancellation of the Building Schools for the Future programme in 2010, the borough changed its proposals, and the switch proceeded on school by school basis where council funds allowed. However, as of 2020 all of Bedford Borough has a two-tier education structure apart from in the Marston Vale area (one upper school remains).

Most of the secondary schools in the area offer sixth form courses (such as A Levels), though Bedford College and The Bedford Sixth Form also offer a range of further education courses. Additionally, Stella Mann College is a private college which offers a range of further education courses relating to the performing arts.

There are a number of independent schools, many of which have links to the Harpur Trust. These include Bedford School, Bedford Modern School and Bedford Girls' School.

=== Central Bedfordshire ===
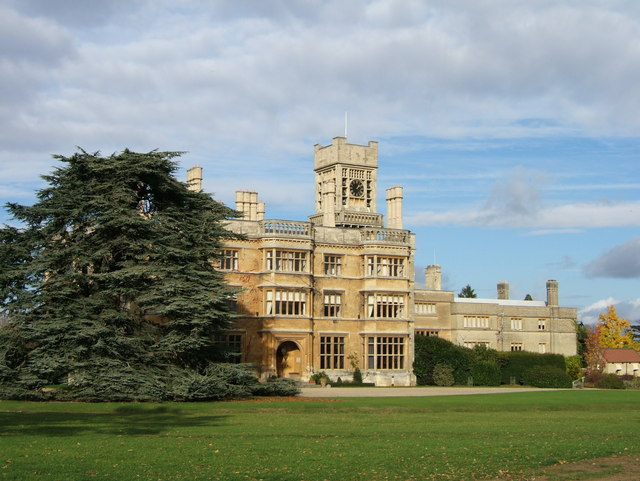
Shuttleworth College

In Central Bedfordshire, the school systems in Dunstable and Sandy have been re-organised into the two-tier model in response to parent and school demand, but elsewhere in the authority the three-tier model continues. Plans for the construction of new settlements in Marston Vale have included lower, middle and upper schools.

As well as sixth form departments in schools, the main further education providers in the district are Central Bedfordshire College and Shuttleworth College

=== Luton ===
Luton also operates a three-tier education system, though its organisation of infant, junior and high schools mirrors the traditional transfer age into secondary education of 11 years. However, most of Luton's high schools do not offer sixth-form education. Instead, this is handled by Luton Sixth Form College, though Barnfield College and Cardinal Newman Catholic School, Stockwood Park Academy and The Chalk Hills Academy also offer a range of further education courses.

=== Higher education ===
There are two universities based in the county – the University of Bedfordshire and Cranfield University. These institutions attract students from all over the UK and abroad, as well as from Bedfordshire.

== Landmarks ==
=== Cardington airship sheds ===
The enormous Cardington airship sheds are situated to the south of Bedford, near the villages of Cardington and Shortstown. They were originally built for the construction of large airships during World War I. Since falling out of their intended use, one has been used for many purposes including housing film sets for 'Charlie and the Chocolate Factory' and 'Batman Begins' and as a rehearsal space for Take That, with the other having been extensively refurbished and now accommodating Hybrid Air Vehicles, a British modern airship design and manufacturing company.

=== St Paul's Church Bedford ===
St Paul's Church, Bedford is a Church of England parish church and the Civic Church of the Borough of Bedford and the County of Bedfordshire. Located on St Paul's Square, it is a large medieval and later church of cathedral proportions and spire. St Paul's was the church of the BBC during the Second World War.

=== Millbrook Proving Ground ===
The Millbrook Proving Ground, near Junction 13 of the M1, has 70 kilometres (43 miles) of varied vehicle test tracks.

== Sport and leisure ==
Bedfordshire is home to League One team Luton Town F.C. and the Ampthill RUFC and Bedford Blues rugby teams, amongst other various sporting teams.

Bedfordshire boasts a 40-mile (64 km) walk traversing the county from Leighton Buzzard at the southern endpoint and Sandy, Bedfordshire/Gamlingay in southern Cambridgeshire to the east; this is called the Greensand Ridge Walk. For cyclists, there is a parallel route called the Greensand Cycle Way that follows minor country roads.

== Bibliographical references ==
- Bedfordshire Magazine (quarterly)
- Elstow Moot Hall leaflets on John Bunyan and 17th century subjects
- Guide to the Bedfordshire Record Office 1957 with supplements.
- Guide to the Russell Estate Collections Published in 1966.
- Conisbe, L. R. (1962) A Bedfordshire Bibliography (supplement, 1967)
- Dony, John (1953) A Bedfordshire Flora. Luton: Corporation of Luton Museum & Art Gallery
- Dony, John (1942) A History of the Straw Hat Industry. Luton: Gibbs, Bamforth & Co.
- Freeman, Charles (1958) Pillow Lace in the East Midlands. Luton: Luton Museum and Art Gallery
- Godber, Joyce (1969) History of Bedfordshire 1066–1888
- White, H. O. Bedfordshire Historical Record Society (published annually)

== See also ==
- Lord Lieutenant of Bedfordshire
- High Sheriff of Bedfordshire
- Healthcare in Bedfordshire
- List of English and Welsh endowed schools (19th century)#Bedfordshire
