= Castle, Bedford =

Electoral ward and area in Bedfordshire, England

Coordinates: 52.13691°N 0.46287°W

Castle
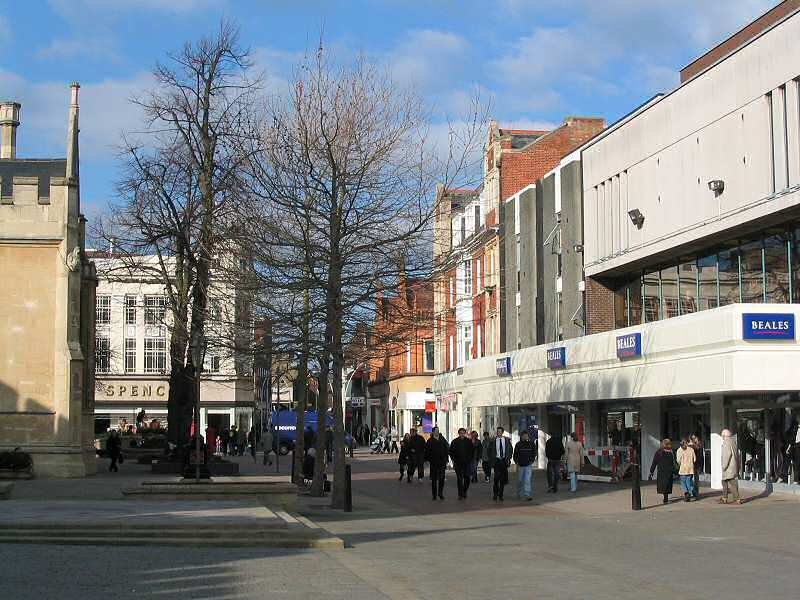
- Bedford town centre, in Castle Ward

- Location within Bedfordshire
- Population: 8,259; 7,113 (2011 Census. Ward)
- OS grid reference: TL052498
- Unitary authority: Bedford
- Ceremonial county: Bedfordshire
- Region: East
- Country: England
- Sovereign state: United Kingdom
- Post town: BEDFORD
- Postcode district: MK40, MK42
- Dialling code: 01234
- Police: Bedfordshire
- Fire: Bedfordshire
- Ambulance: East of England
- UK Parliament: Bedford

Castle is an electoral ward and area of Bedford, Bedfordshire, England.

The Castle area incorporates the site of Bedford Castle and the town's historic centre including its market and High Street, as well as nearby residential streets.

In common usage the Castle area is often synonymous with the Castle Road neighbourhood. The boundaries of the Castle and Newnham Electoral ward are loosely aligned with this, falling between Bromham Road and Goldington Road to the north, Newnham Avenue to the east, the River Great Ouse to the south, and Harpur Street to the west.

== History ==
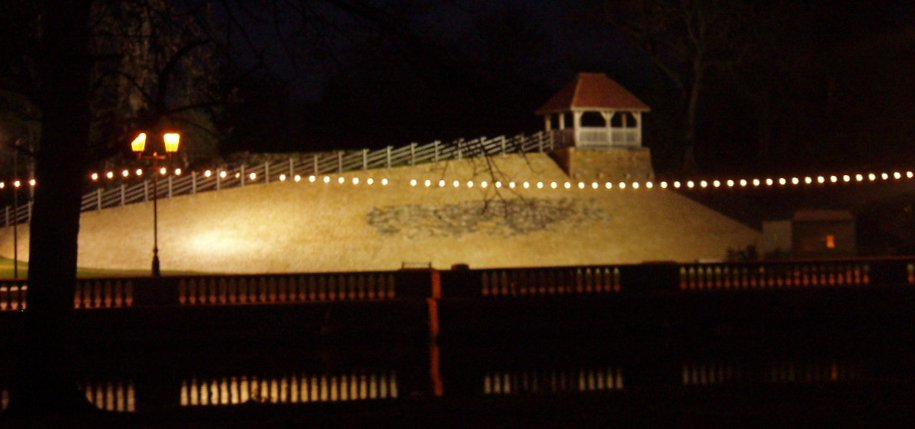
Bedford Castle

The name 'Castle' comes from Bedford Castle which is located in the ward. William II granted the Barony of Bedford to Paine de Beauchamp who built the castle. The castle was destroyed (slighted) in 1224 by Henry III. In 1166 the town of Bedford was given a charter. This was when Bedford Market was founded, and it is still held in Castle Ward.

To the south of the river, Cauldwell Priory was built in the area by Franciscan Friars in 1238. The priory included a leper colony dedicated to St Leonard. The priory was dissolved by King Henry VIII in 1541, and around this time a new bridge was built over the River Great Ouse, and the town of Bedford began to expand to the south of the river. The river became navigable as far as Bedford by 1689. Up until this time, Bedford was a small agricultural town, with wool being an important industry in the area for much of the Middle Ages. However, with the opening up of the River Great Ouse, wool declined in importance and brewing became a major industry in the town.

In 1660 John Bunyan was imprisoned for 12 years in Bedford Gaol, which was located in present-day Castle Ward. It was here that he wrote The Pilgrim's Progress.

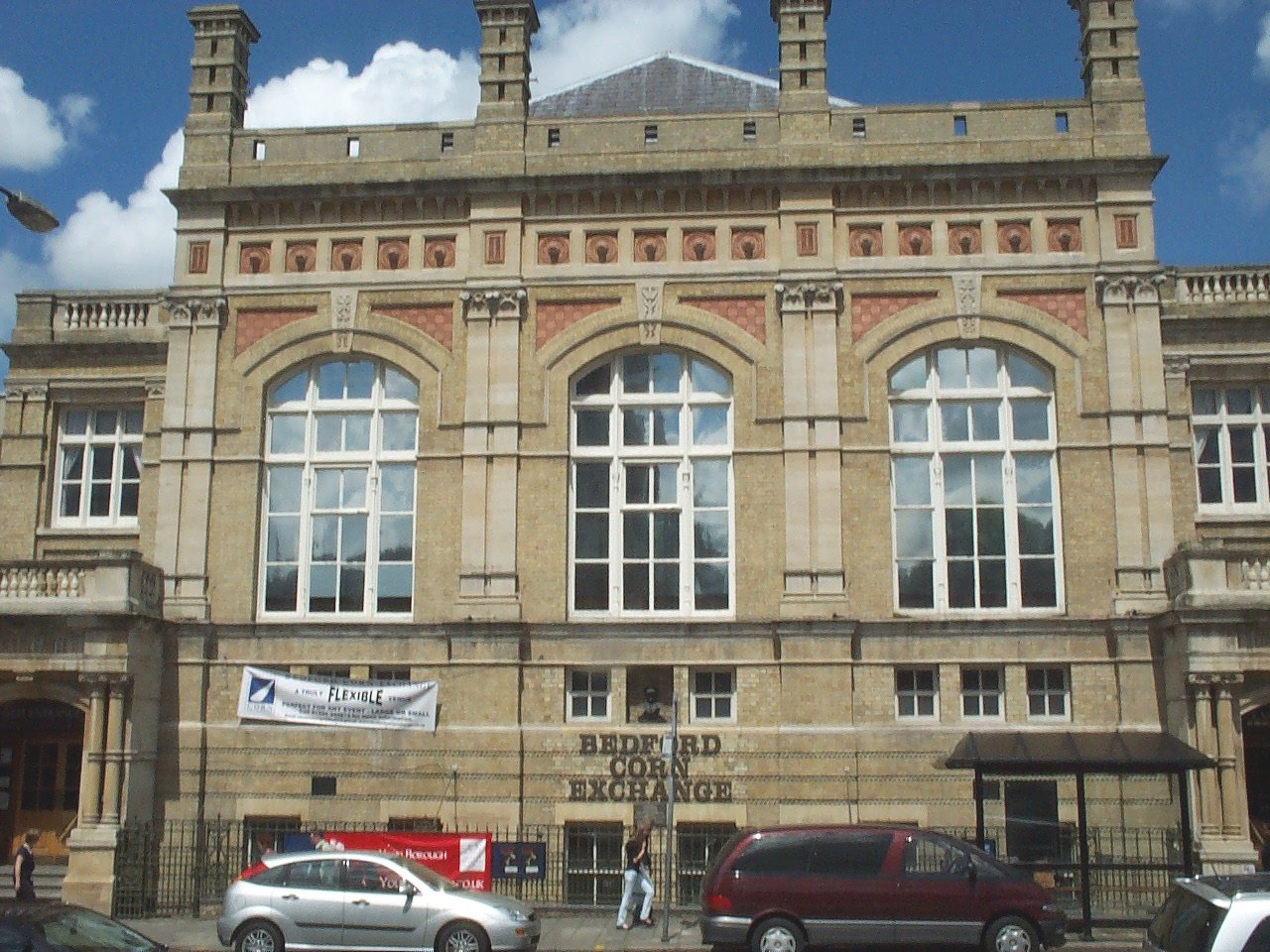
Bedford Corn Exchange

The 19th Century saw Bedford transform into an important engineering hub. In 1832 Gas lighting was introduced into the area that is now Castle Ward, and the railway reached Bedford in 1846. Bedford's Corn Exchange was built in the area in 1849, and the first drains and sewers were dug in 1864. Bedford's growth in the 19th century saw the Castle area expand along the river to the east.

After the Second World War, the Cauldwell Street neighbourhood of terraced houses was demolished, making way for new offices and public buildings, including headquarters for Bedford College and Bedfordshire County Council.

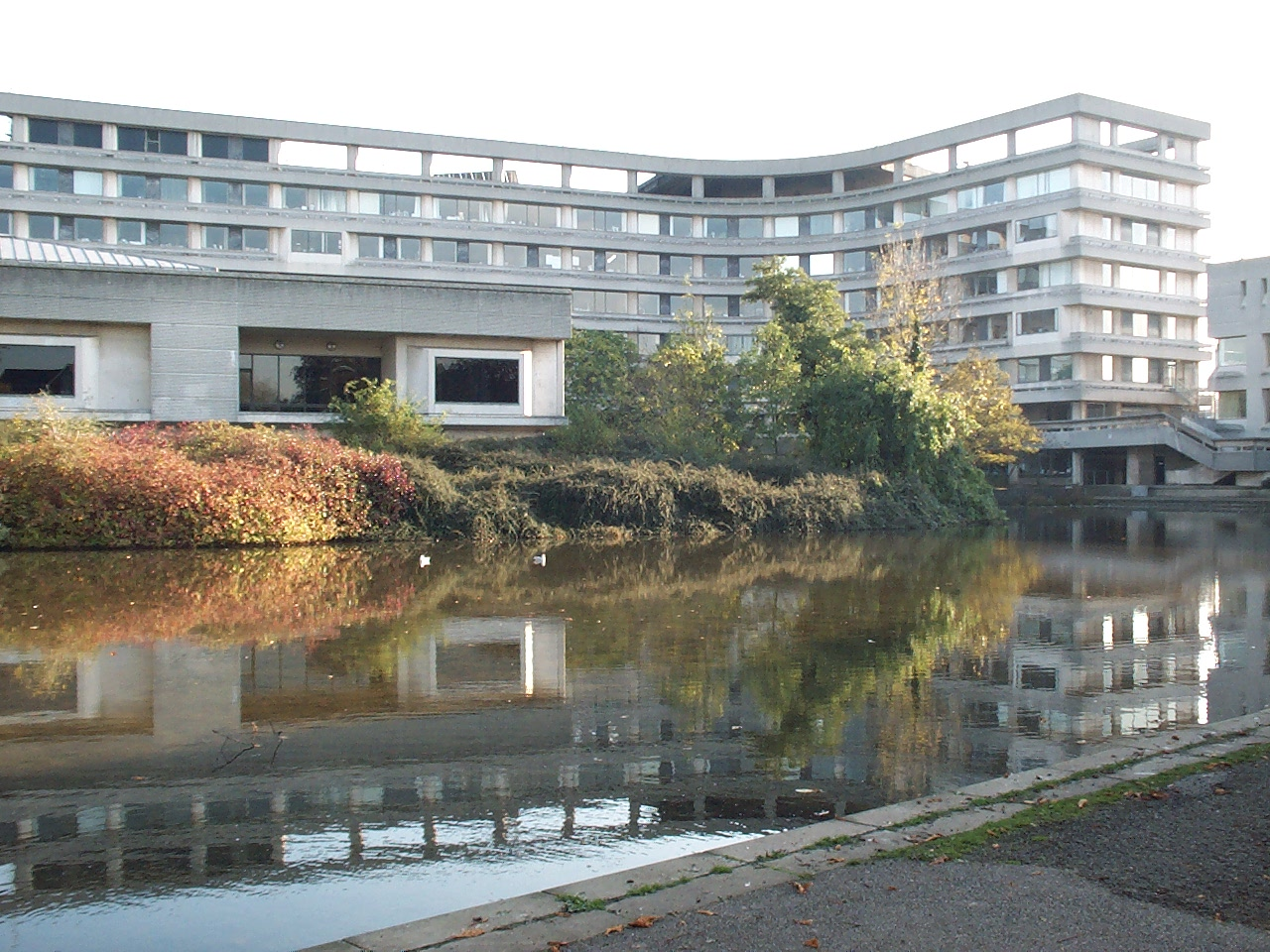
Bedford Borough Hall in Castle

== Governance ==
Castle is an unparished area, with all community services under the direct control of Bedford Borough Council.

Following local government boundary changes in Bedford in 2011 Castle Ward previously included almost all of Bedford town centre, but only the western part of the Castle Road neighbourhood, as the eastern part of which was included in Newnham Ward. Castle's electoral ward boundaries then were Bromham Road and Goldington Road to the north, Denmark Street to the east, the Rope Walk to the south, and the Midland Mainline Railway to the west. It was the only ward in the town of Bedford to be located on both sides of the River Great Ouse. Castle elected two councillors to Bedford Borough Council.

Boundary changes before the 2023 election saw the formation of a new electoral ward covering the town centre, named Greyfriars and electing one councillor. This extends from Harpur Street to the Midland Mainline Railway, taking in the former western part of Castle ward. At the same time, the Castle ward was extended eastwards from the old boundary of Denmark Street as far as Newnham Avenue and also including Aylesbury Road, Hatfield Crescent, Riseborough Road and Wendover Drive. The southern boundary was moved north to the River Great Ouse. These changes also saw the ward, which still elects two councillors, renamed Castle and Newnham.

In 2019 Castle elected the first two Green Party councillors in Bedford. At the 2023 Bedford Borough Council election, Green candidates were elected to the seat for Greyfriars ward and to both seats for Castle and Newnham ward.

== Economy ==
Virtually all of the Bedford's central business district is located in Castle Ward, with many major High Street shops being located here. The main shopping areas of note are the High Street which includes a Wilko store, banks, many pubs, nightclubs and restaurants. The Harpur Centre is Bedford's main shopping centre. Branches of Boots, TK Maxx, Primark and various other stores are located here. Located in the eastern section of the Castle Road neighbourhood there are a host of smaller independent shops and community stores.

Many of Bedford's central amenities are located in Castle Ward, including Bedford's main post office, market, magistrates court, Bedford bus station and Bedford railway station. Two of Bedford's largest hotels are located in the Ward - The Swan Hotel on the High Street, and Mercure Bedford Centre Hotel situated across the river on St Mary's Street.

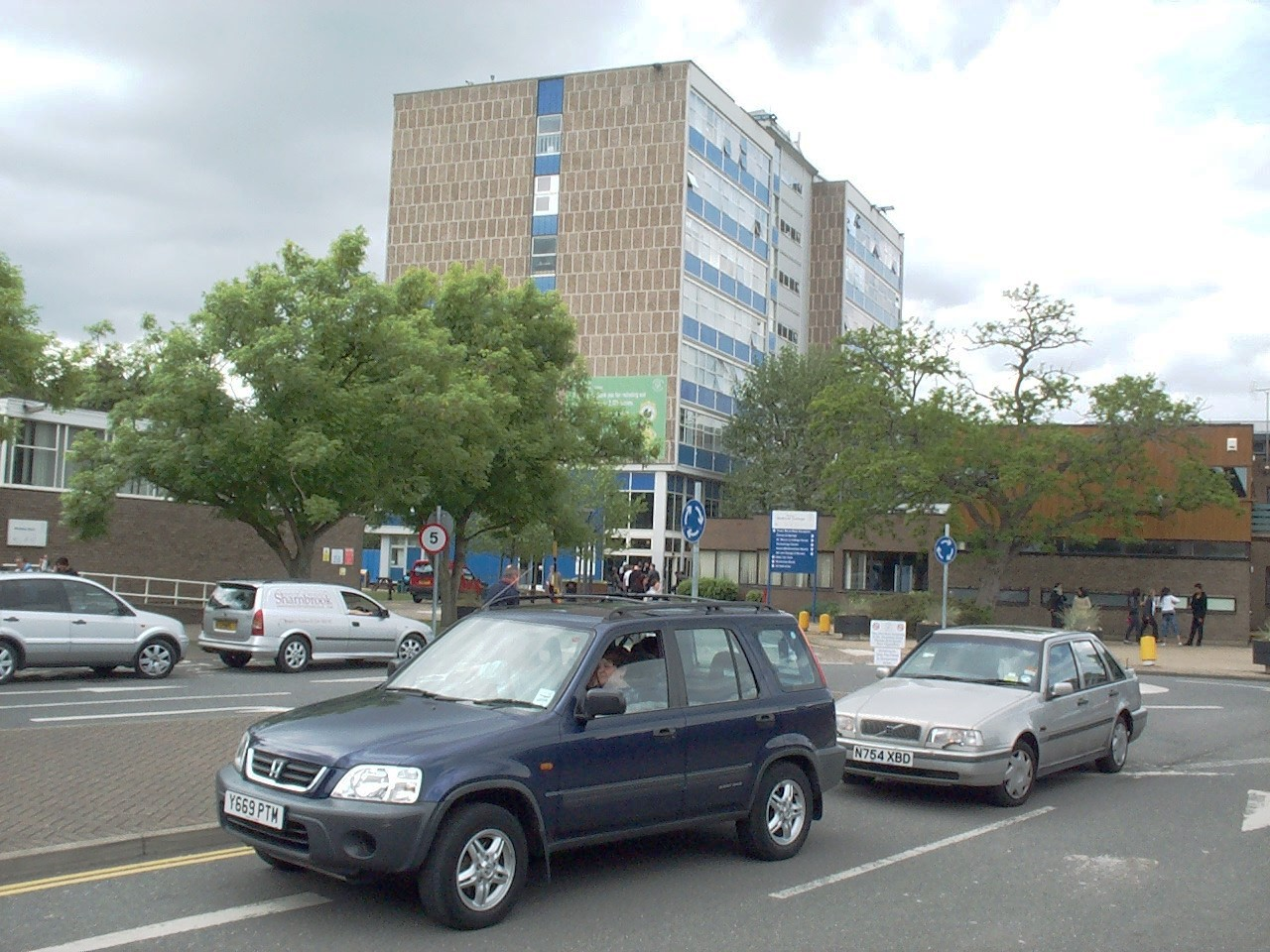
Bedford College in Castle Ward

Also south of the river, there are a few more shops located around the St Mary's Street/St John's Street/Cauldwell Street area. It is here that Bedford College is located, as well as a Farmfoods store. Borough Hall, the administrative headquarters of Bedford Borough Council is also located here.

== Education ==
Priory Primary School is located on Greyfriars, while Castle Newnham School has a campus for primary school age pupils situated on Goldington Road. For secondary school education Bedford Free School is located on Cauldwell Street, though many Castle students attend either Biddenham International School or Castle Newnham School.

Bedford Girls' School is an independent school for girls aged 7–18, located on Cardington Road in Castle Ward. The school is part of the Harpur Trust.

Bedford College has its main site on Cauldwell Street, and offers a range of further education courses including GCSEs, A Levels, Apprenticeships and Access courses.

== Religious sites ==
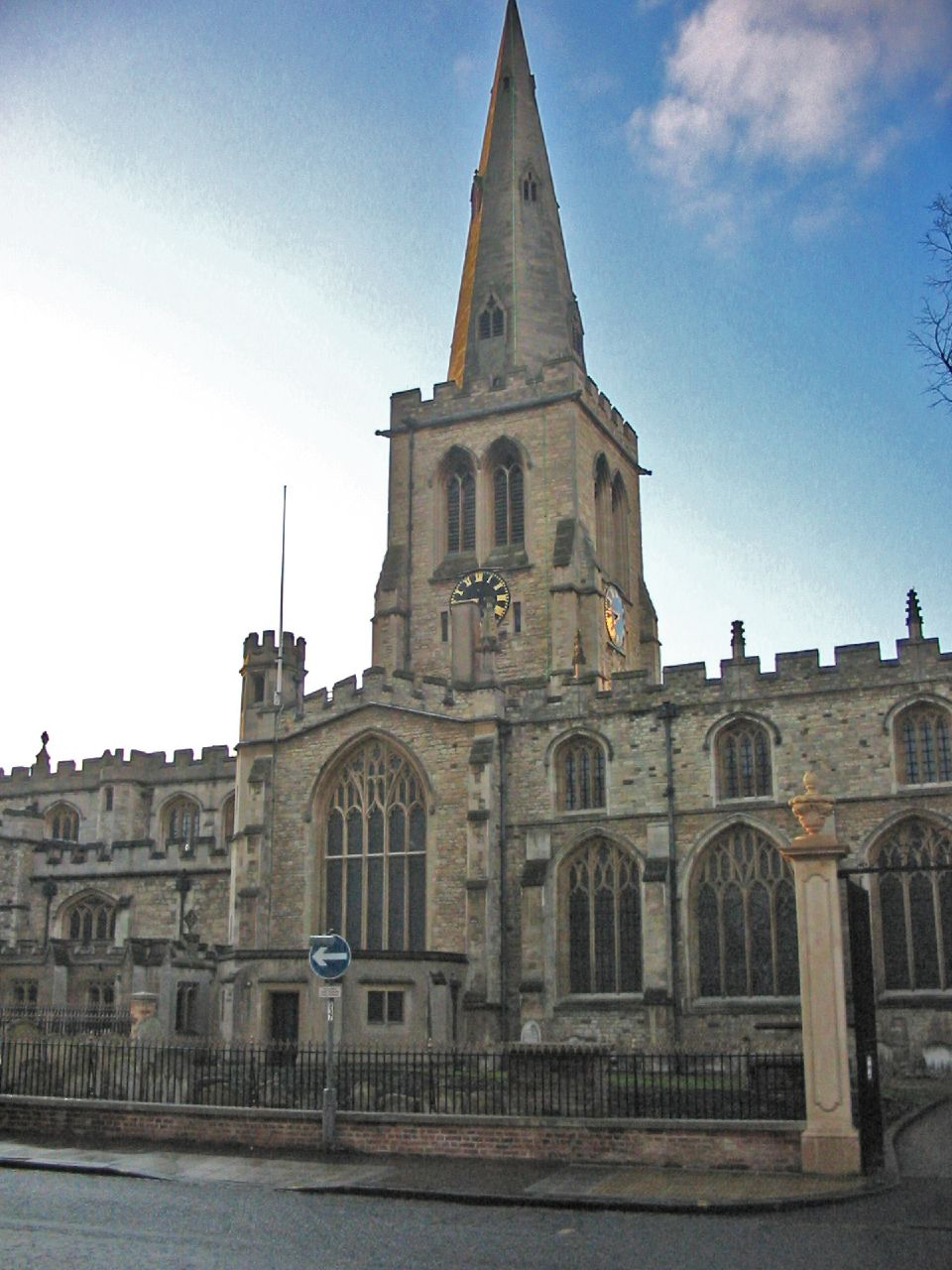
St. Paul's Church is in Castle Ward

There are many places of worship in Castle Ward, some of which serve the entire Bedford area -

- St Paul's Church, Bedford (Church of England), located on St Paul's Square
- Bedford Spiritualist Church, located on Ashburnam Road
- Mount Zion Church, located on Midland Road
- St Joseph & The Holy Child Roman Catholic Church, also on Midland Road
- St Frances Cabrini Italian Church, located on Woburn Road
- Rutland Road Church, located on Rutland Road
- The Miracle of God in Christ Church, located on Alexandra Road
- The Bedford Jamee Masjid & Islamic Cultural Centre, located on Brereton Road
- Bedford Pentecostal Church, located on Roise Street
- The Salvation Army run the Bedford Congress Hall, located on Commercial Road
- The Bedford Bangladeshi Mosque & Islamic Mission, also on Commercial Road
- The Bunyan Meeting Free Church & John Bunyan Museum, located on Mill Street
- Polish Church of Sacred Heart of Jesus & St Cuthbert, also on Mill Street
- The Panacea Society had its international headquarters on Albany Road
- The Providence Baptist Chapel, located on Rothsay Road
- The St Josaphat Ukrainian Church (Byzantine Rite), located on York Street
- St John's and St Leonard's Church (Church of England), located on St Johns Street and Victoria Road
- Southside Family Church (Newfrontiers), also on St Johns Street

== Community facilities ==
The main open space in the Castle area is Russell Park and the Embankment of the River Great Ouse. The Bedford Corn Exchange, The Higgins Art Gallery & Museum and Esquires (a live music venue) are also located in Castle Ward.
