= Transport in Bedford =

Transport in Bedford provides links between the town and other parts of England. Road access to and from the town is provided by the A6 and A421 roads; the former connects the town with Kettering to the north-west, and Luton to the south, whilst the latter connects the town with Milton Keynes and the M1 (at Junction 13) to the west, and the A1 to the east (near St Neots) via a bypass, with both being around 10 miles (16 km) away. Other roads that serve or skirt the town include the A422, which runs westwards into Milton Keynes (also connecting to the M1 at Junction 14 via the A509), and the A428, which runs between Coventry and Cambridge.

== Roads ==
Bedford lies on the A6 road, and two of the most important north–south routes in Great Britain, the A1 and the M1 motorway, pass a few miles to the east and west respectively. The A421 links the town to the M1 and A1 via the dual carriageway bypass. This has significantly improved access to the town, which formerly required the use of frequently congested single carriageway roads. Bedford has a southern bypass along the A421.

The first section of the Bedford Western Bypass (from the A421 and the A428 road) was completed in December 2009. It is named after former mayor Frank Branston and is designated as part of the A428 trunk road.

A new 13 km dual carriageway on the A421 opened on 1 December 2010 alongside the older carriageway between the M1 Junction 13 and the Bedford Southern bypass and a new bridge over the M1 together with changes to the A6 road.

Bedford also has its own Park and ride operation situated to the south of the town near Elstow. Currently this is the only site which has been completed, but there are plans to develop more sites around the town.

=== Cycling ===
Bedford is part of National Cycle Route 51. The Bedford Green Wheel allows cyclists to use a network of cycle routes around and in Bedford.

The main organisation campaigning for the improvement of cycling provision in North Bedfordshire is the Cycling Campaign for North Bedfordshire.

=== Proposed road developments ===
==== Bedford Western bypass (A428 – A6 north) ====
In October 2014, work began on phase 2 of the Western Bypass from the A428 and the A6 to the north of the town. The first section of the bypass from the A421 to the A428 opened in December 2009.

==== Bedford high Street A6 Closure ====
In December 2010 the high street was closed to through traffic with diversions in place for the pedestrianisation and Christmas market. It has been a proposal of the Mayor of Bedford to pedestrianise the high street via the proposed western bypass and this has been treated as a potential trial of the proposal.

== Buses and coaches ==
Prior to bus deregulation in 1986, bus services in and around Bedford were run by the United Counties subsidiary of the National Bus Company. The independent operator Birch Brothers ran a frequent service from Bedford to London between 1928 and 1969, but the service was then taken over by United Counties and later discontinued. The United Counties business was bought by the Stagecoach Group in November 1987 and has since been branded Stagecoach in Bedford.

The town's bus services and major bus routes include route X5 to Milton Keynes, Cambridge and Oxford and services to Northampton, Kettering and other towns in the region. There is currently no bus or coach service between Bedford and London. Bedford bus station is due for major redevelopment as part of a scheme to renovate the town centre.

Some withdrawals of services by Stagecoach have led to other providers introducing services in Bedford, including Uno who run services to/from Milton Keynes, Grant Palmer of Dunstable who run to Flitwick and Dunstable, and Fenlake based company Expresslines. Cedar Coaches also runs services from Bedford to surrounding areas.

Other operators in Bedford have included Emerton of Cranfield, Buffalo Travel of Flitwick, Mullover Travel of Bedford, Jey-son Coaches of Luton and JBS travel of Blunham. Jey-son Coaches was sold to Buffalo and later both JBS & Buffalo both launched competitive attacks on certain routes against Stagecoach, but neither were successful in the long term, and both companies have ceased trading. Arriva Shires & Essex formerly operated services to Olney and Milton Keynes, but these have since been taken over by Stagecoach.

== Rail ==
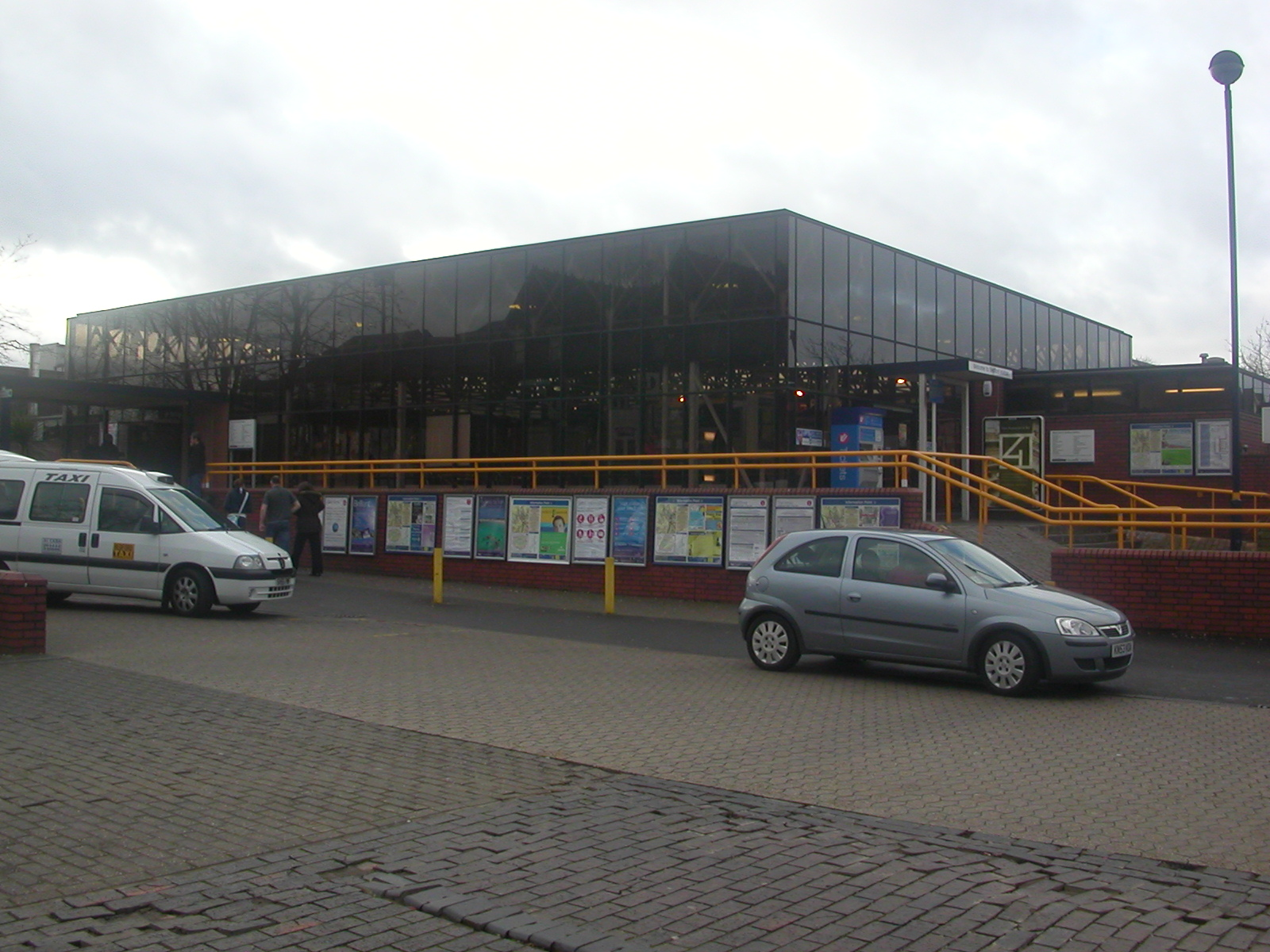
Bedford railway station

Bedford has two railway stations:

- Bedford (Midland) is located on the Midland Main Line. It is the northernmost stop on the Thameslink rail service from Brighton. East Midlands Railway also serve the station, providing trains to St Pancras, Leicester, Nottingham, Sheffield and Leeds. It is also the terminus of the Marston Vale Line from Bletchley.
- Bedford St Johns is the penultimate stop on the Marston Vale line.
