= Putnoe Wood =

Nature reserve in Bedford, England

Coordinates: 52.162708°N 0.440774°W

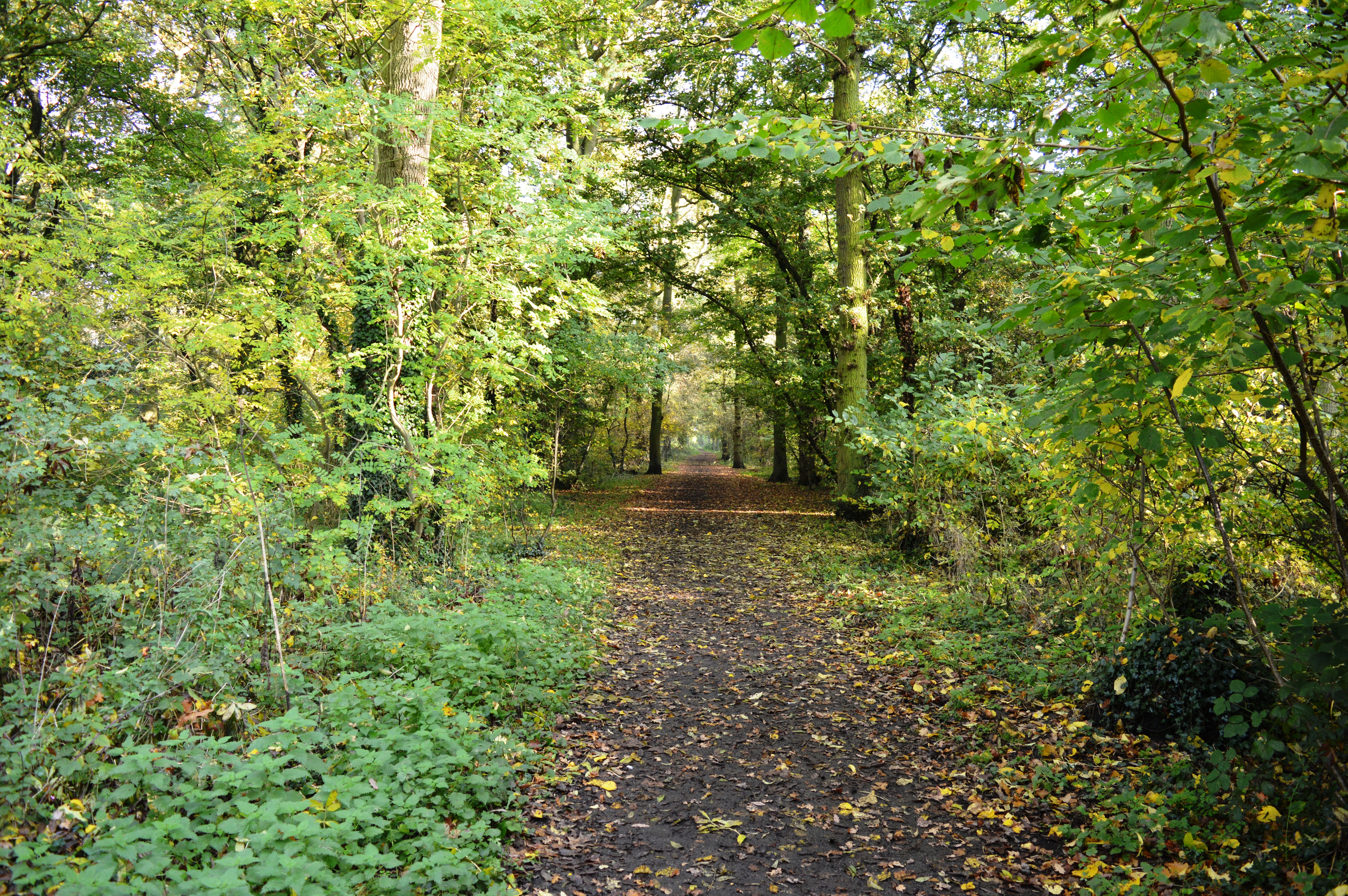

Putnoe Wood is a 10.4 hectare Local Nature Reserve located in the Putnoe area of Bedford. It is owned by Bedford Borough Council and maintained by the council with the assistance of the Friends of Putnoe Wood and Mowsbury Hillfort.

The site was purchased by the council in the mid-twentieth century. It is ancient woodland with hazel coppice in the northern half, and the ground flora has areas of bluebells. Bird species include wood pigeons, blue tits and great tits.

There is access from Mowsbury Park on Wentworth Drive.
