= Greenwheel (disambiguation) =

Greenwheel or Green Wheel may refer to:

- Greenwheel, US rock band
- GreenWheel, cycling technology
- Green Wheel, cycle route in Peterborough, England
- Bedford Green Wheel, cycle route in Bedford, England
- GreenWheel EV, Chinese electric vehicle manufacturer
- Greenwheels, a car-sharing company
- Green Wheels, a 1995 album by Masami Akita
