= Bedford Independent =

English newspaper

- Type: Digital newspaper
- Publisher: Progress Publishing Ltd
- Editor: Paul Hutchinson
- Founded: 13 August 2018
- Political alignment: Independent
- Sister newspapers: Bedford Clanger
- Website: bedfordindependent.co.uk

The Bedford Independent is a free local online newspaper based in Bedford, Bedfordshire, England. The publication covers the Borough of Bedford and some villages on the border with Central Bedfordshire and Buckinghamshire. It is owned and operated independently by Progress Publishing Ltd.

== History ==
The Bedford Independent was launched on social media on 13 August 2018 initially only publishing articles on Facebook. Reaching "in excess of 250,000" people on social media, it launched a dedicated news website on 28 November 2019 and also launched a presence on YouTube, Twitter, LinkedIn and Instagram.

Initially, the Bedford Independent also published a short print version of their most read stories each month in their sister publication The Bedford Clanger, but printing ended during the COVID-19 pandemic and The Bedford Clanger was moved online as part of the Bedford Independent's main website.

The publication is run by Paul Hutchinson, former Chiltern FM deputy news editor; Erica Roffe, founder of local arts and culture magazine the Bedford Clanger; and commercial director Julia Course-Crofts, who has worked for titles including Bedfordshire on Sunday, MK on Sunday, Affinity Magazine and The Bedford Clanger.

== Style ==
The editorial style is politically independent and articles are neutral in their presentation. Their editorial policy takes an active stance against sensationalism, clickbait and fake news. They follow a 'reader first' approach and a broadcast media style of reporting through video from the scene of stories.

== Notable stories ==
Notable stories include the "'North Wing' Bedford Hospital fire", which was picked up by national media and the confirmation that Comcast had bought land in Bedford Borough to be used as a possible Universal Studios theme park.

== DCMS inquiry into the sustainability of local journalism ==
In 2022 the Bedford Independent gave written evidence to the UK Government's Department of Digital, Culture, Media and Sport (DCMS) Committee for their investigation into the sustainability of local journalism.

As a result of this, they were invited to give oral evidence to the committee during a hearing at Cardiff University’s School of Journalism, Media and Culture.

The Bedford Independent's evidence both written and oral was then used by the DCMS Committee to write their report into the sustainability of local journalism and make various recommendations to the UK Government.

== Regulation ==
The Bedford Independent is regulated by independent press regulator Impress. They are also a member of the Independent Community News Network (ICNN).

Editor Paul Hutchinson also sits on the Impress Standards Code Committee
