= Putnoe =

Area of Bedford, England

Coordinates: 52.15134°N 0.43628°W

- Location within Bedfordshire
- Population: 8,593; 7,198 (2011 Census)
- OS grid reference: TL070514
- Unitary authority: Bedford
- Ceremonial county: Bedfordshire
- Region: East
- Country: England
- Sovereign state: United Kingdom
- Post town: BEDFORD
- Postcode district: MK41
- Dialling code: 01234
- Police: Bedfordshire
- Fire: Bedfordshire
- Ambulance: East of England
- UK Parliament: Bedford

Putnoe is an electoral ward on the northern side of Bedford, England.

The boundaries of Putnoe are approximately Mowsbury Park and golf course to the north, Church Lane and Haylands Way to the east, Polhill Avenue to the south, with Kimbolton Road to the west. Part of the area is also known as Woodside.

== History ==
Putnoe was listed in the Domesday Book: Putenehou: Hugh de Beauchamp. Mill.

The name in its present form has been around since the 16th century, but was formerly known as Puttenhoe and Putenho indicating the spur or "hoh" of land belonging to an unknown Anglo-Saxon settler Putta. The original farmstead may have been on the same site as Putnoe Farm which is now occupied by Puttenhoe Elderly Person's Home, next to Putnoe Street.

The area remained undeveloped farmland until after World War II . At this time momentum grew in Bedford to plan the re-development of the town from its population of 58,000 to 75,000. This required the provision of a substantial area of land for housing development. The decision to develop the Putnoe area was taken in 1950, and the first phase of construction of the Putnoe estate occurred between 1953 and 1957.

== Governance ==
Putnoe is an unparished area, with all community services under the direct control of Bedford Borough Council. Putnoe elects two councillors to Bedford Borough Council, both of whom are currently Liberal Democrats.

== Economy ==
Putnoe is almost entirely residential, there are no major industrial or business estates in the area. Most shops and services are clustered around a shopping parade called Library Walk as a public library is situated here, located on Putnoe Street. A One Stop supermarket, a bakery and cafe, a butcher's, an optician's, a newsagents and post office, a pub named The Bluebell, and an Elderly Persons Home called 'Puttenhoe' are all located here.

== Education ==
There are five state schools in Putnoe - Hazeldene Primary School and The Hills Academy are both located on the same Stancliffe Road site.

Putnoe Primary School is situated over two sites on Overdale and Church Lane, and educates pupils up to the age of 11.

Mark Rutherford School, located on Wentworth Drive is Putnoe's secondary school and sixth form.

== Religious sites ==
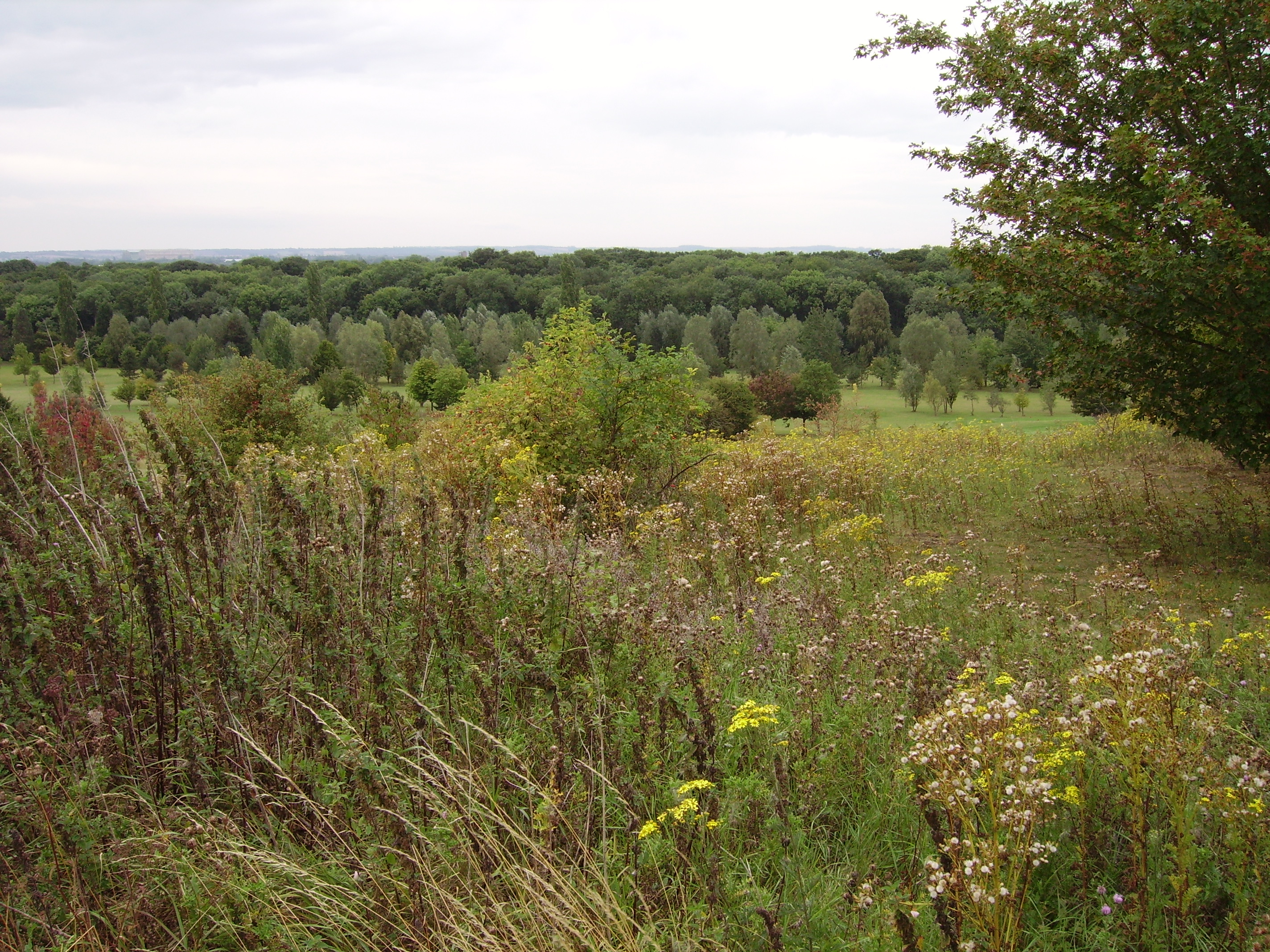
Putnoe Woods

- Putnoe Heights Church of England and Methodist Church, located on Putnoe Heights
- Woodside Church (Newfrontiers), located on Dover Crescent

== Community facilities ==
Putnoe's largest open space is Mowsbury Park and Putnoe Woods which are located on Wentworth Drive. Bedford Tigers rugby league club play their home matches here, and Bedford Athletic Rugby Union Club also has its ground here. The ground is used by local schools, and the club house is used by Putnoe community groups. Mowsbury Golf Course and Squash Complex is located directly to the north of the park, and is operated by Bedford Borough Council.

There is a community library situated on Putnoe Street. The area has a regular bus service into Bedford Town Centre, and there are many post and telephone boxes dotted around the locality.
