= Bedford Free School =

Free school in Bedfordshire, England

Location
- Cauldwell Street; Bedford, Bedfordshire, MK42 9AD; England; 52.1324°N 0.46670°E

Information
- Type: Free school
- Motto: Respect, Honesty, High Expectations
- Religious affiliation: None
- Established: 2010
- Founder: Mark Lehain
- Department for Education URN: 138228 Tables
- Ofsted: Reports
- Principal: Benover
- Gender: Mixed
- Age: 11 to 16
- Colours: Yellow and purple
- Website: www.bedfordfreeschool.co.uk

Bedford Free School, part of Advantage Schools, is a mixed secondary free school located in Bedford, Bedfordshire, England. The school opened in September 2012, and educates pupils from Bedford, Kempston and the wider Borough of Bedford.

== History ==
Campaigning for a free school in Bedford and Kempston began in July 2010. On 6 September 2010, Michael Gove (Secretary of State for Education) announced Bedford Free School as one of the first 16 free schools to be set up under the UK coalition government. The business case for Bedford Free School was signed off by the Department for Education in May 2011.

Founding Principal Mark Lehain who was previously head of mathematics and assistant head at Wootton Upper School. The school's initial governing body included a deputy Mayor, councillor, a magistrate, a stockbroker and a chartered accountant.

In August 2011, Cauldwell House was chosen as the site for the school. Bedford Free School was due to open in September 2012, however in June 2012, members of Bedford Borough Council’s planning committee voted to not grant planning permission to the new school. The refusal of planning permission centred on concerns that the new school would create an unacceptable increase in traffic in the immediate area, and also that pupils safety may be compromised when being dropped off and picked up outside the school.

The refusal of planning permission was called "spiteful" by Richard Fuller, the MP for Bedford. He suggested that the decision was politically motivated by members of the council that were opposed the free schools programme. The school appealed the decision, and still opened in September 2012. Further to this, the school drew up contingency plans, should the appeal fail, and would have seen children at the school taught in a building at nearby Bedford College. In November 2012, the school won its appeal against the council's decision, after Eric Pickles (the Secretary of State for Communities and Local Government) decided in its favour.

In March 2013 it was reported that Bedford Free School had been established at a time when there would be a 25% surplus in secondary school places in Bedford.

In February 2014 the schools first Ofsted inspection was published and gave the school a rating of 'Requires improvement'. The report found that pupils at the school 'do not sustain good progress', and that the 'teaching does not expect enough of students'. Unusually the report also found that boys make better progress at the school than girls.

In February 2015 the school was awarded a grant to construct a new sports hall and activity studio.

In March 2016, the school received a Good rating in its second Ofsted inspection. In April 2017, the school announced that, in partnership with Elstow School, it would establish a new Multi-Academy Trust (MAT) named Advantage Schools.

In September 2017, Mark Lehain left the school and Stuart Lock was appointed as his successor. Previously the Headteacher of Cottenham Village College, Lock also took on the role of chief executive of Advantage Schools. In 2019, he transitioned to this role full-time, with Tim Blake succeeding him as Principal. In January 2020, Bedford Free School was rated Outstanding by Ofsted in all areas.
