= Barony of Bedford =

Extinct barony in the Peerage of the United Kingdom

- Creation date: ?
- Created by: William Rufus
- Peerage: Peerage of England
- First holder: Paine de Beauchamp
- Remainder to: Duke of Bedford

Barony of England, Bedford, England.

== First creation ==
- Created for Payne de Beauchamp, by William Rufus
- William de Beauchamp - forfeit for rebelling in the First Barons' War
- Faukes de Brent - sent by King John of England to enforce William's forfeit, forfeit himself for rebellion under Henry III of England

Extinct? Merged? Merged to Duke of Bedford in 1138, 1366 or 1414

== See also ==
- Bedford Castle
