= Bedford Green Wheel =

Cycling route in Bedford, England

The Bedford Green Wheel is a network of traffic free paths and quiet routes for cyclists and walkers in and around Bedford, England. This network included 'spokes' linking into the town centre. The network links parks, nature reserves, countryside and homes. This project was announced as part of Bedford Borough Council's Green Infrastructure Plan 2009.

The Cycling Campaign for North Bedfordshire promotes and encourages the use of the Bedford Green Wheel.
