= Bedford =

Town in Bedfordshire, England

Coordinates: 52°8′11″N 0°28′03″W

- Town
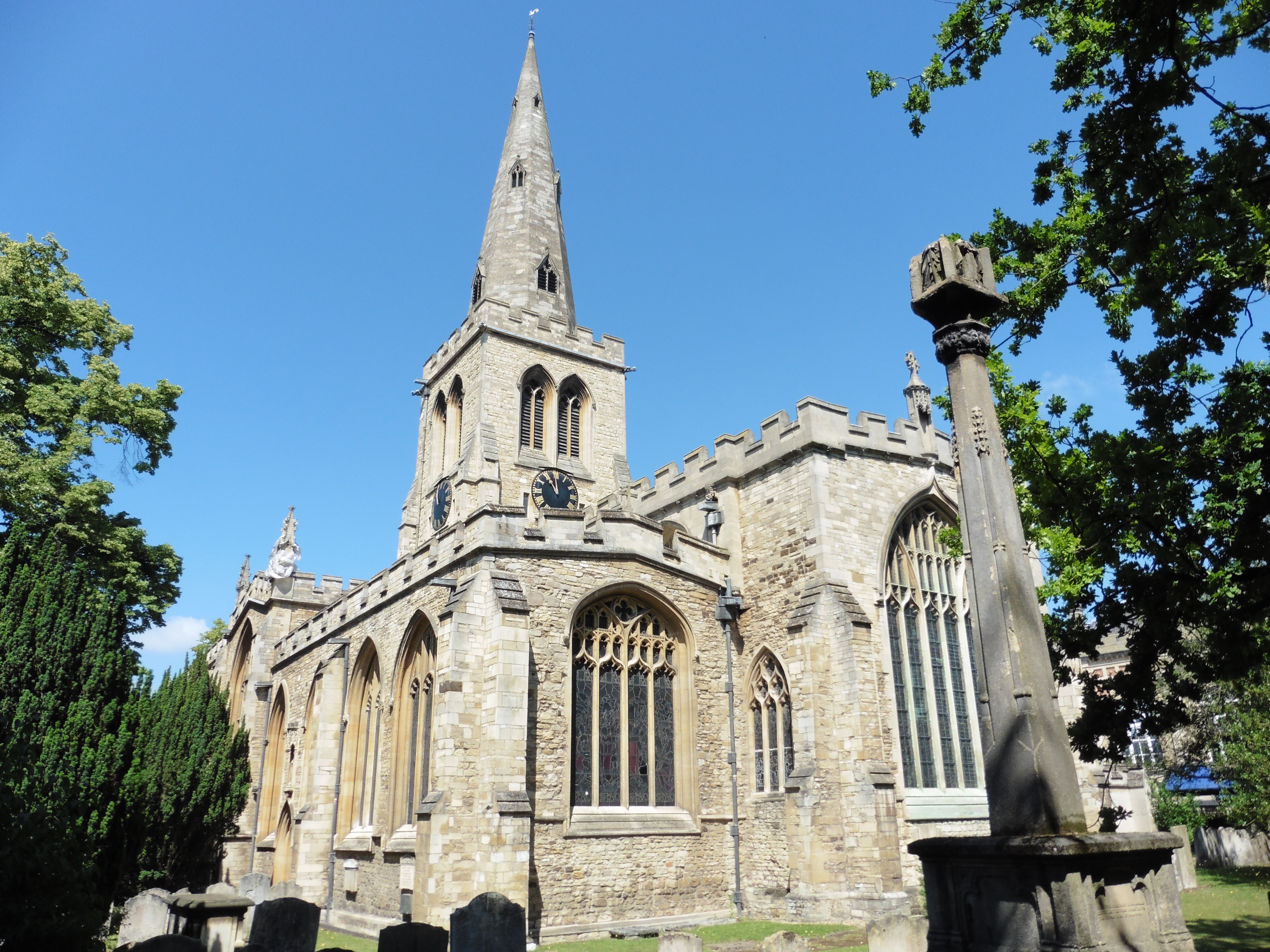
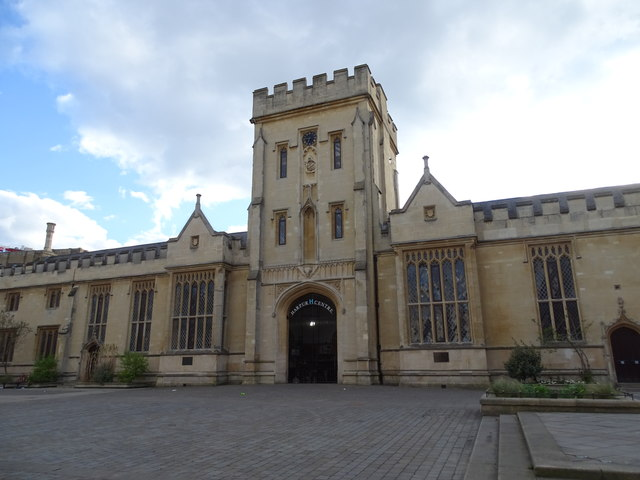
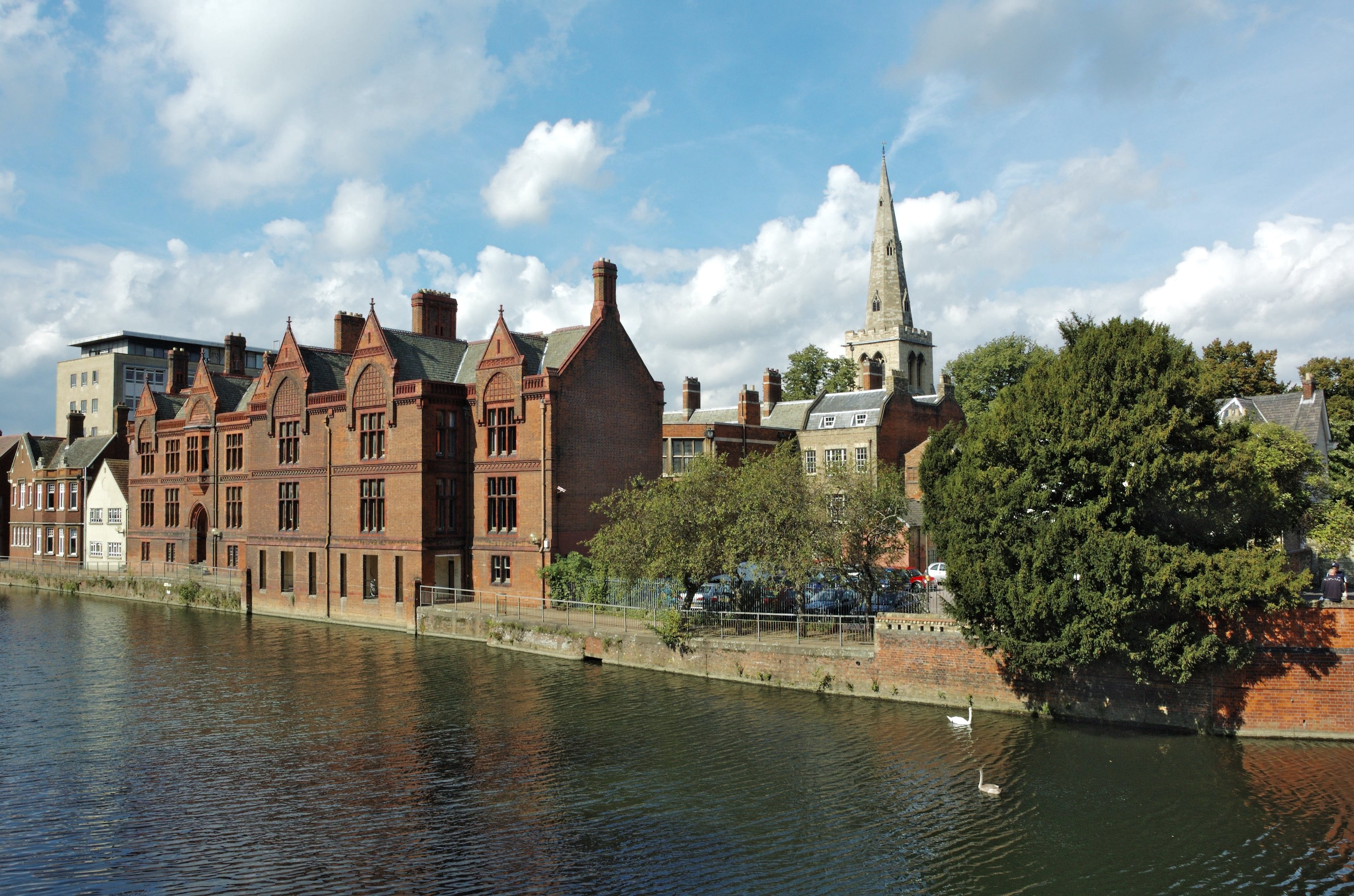
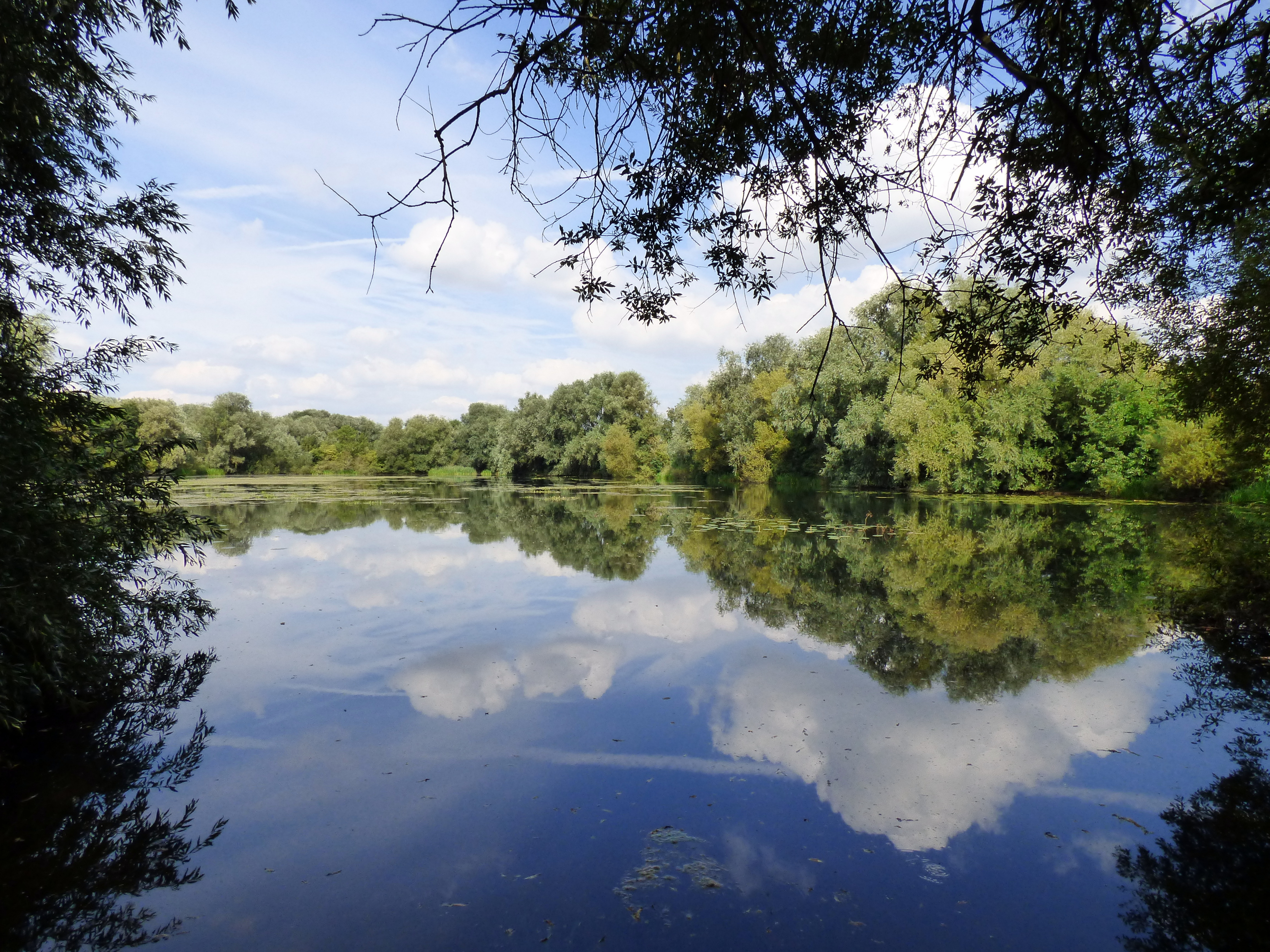
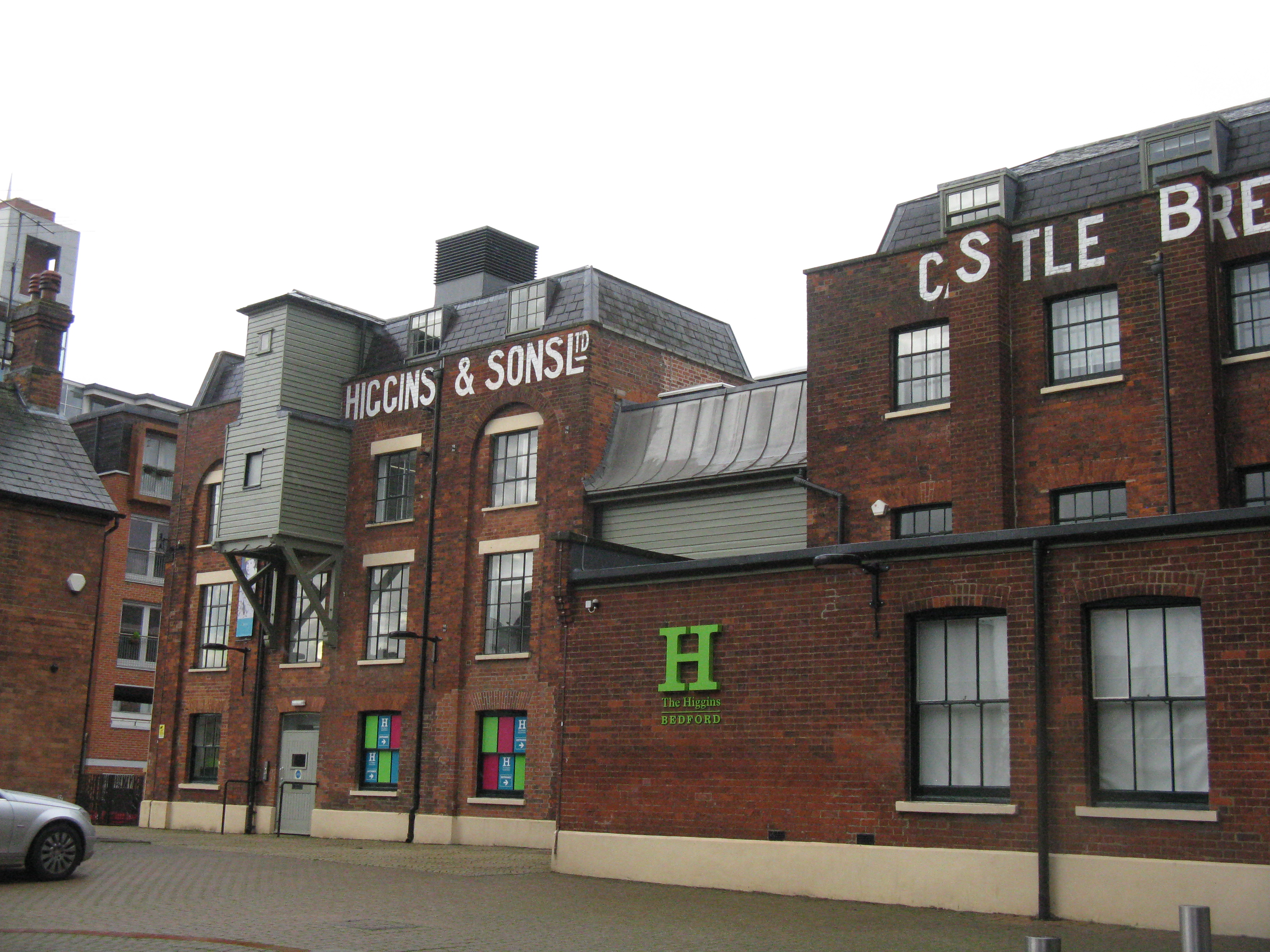
- St Paul's Church Harpur Centre Shire Hall next to the River Ouse Priory Country Park The Higgins

- Location within Bedfordshire Bedford (Bedfordshire)
- Population: 167,446 (2021 built-up area including Biddenham and Kempston)
- OS grid reference: TL055495
  - London: 46 miles (74 km) S
- Unitary authority: Borough of Bedford
- Ceremonial county: Bedfordshire
- Region: East
- Country: England
- Sovereign state: United Kingdom
- Post town: Bedford
- Postcode district: MK40–MK45
- Dialling code: 01234
- Police: Bedfordshire
- Fire: Bedfordshire
- Ambulance: East of England
- UK Parliament: Bedford

Bedford is a market town in Bedfordshire. At the 2021 Census, the population of its urban area was 167,446. Bedford is the county town of Bedfordshire and seat of the Borough of Bedford local government district.

Bedford was founded at a ford on the River Great Ouse and is thought to have been the burial place of King Offa of Mercia, who is remembered for building Offa's Dyke on the Welsh border. Bedford Castle was built by Henry I, although it was destroyed in 1224. Bedford was granted borough status in 1166 and has been represented in Parliament since 1265. It is known for its large population of Italian descent.

== History ==
Roman estates with associated villas are known in the outskirts of the town, one of which is of particularly high status with fine stucco decoration found only in 2 or 3 places in the Roman north-western provinces.

The name of the town is believed to derive from the name of a Saxon chief called Beda, and a ford crossing the River Great Ouse. Bedford was a market town for the surrounding agricultural region from the early Middle Ages. The Anglo-Saxon King Offa of Mercia was buried in the town in 796; this is believed to be in his new minster, now the Church of St Paul, or on the banks of the Great Ouse where his tomb was soon lost to the river. In 886 it became a boundary town separating Wessex and Danelaw. It was the seat of the Barony of Bedford. In 919 Edward the Elder built the town's first known fortress, on the south side of the River Great Ouse and there received the area's submission. This fortress was destroyed by the Danes. William II gave the barony of Bedford to Paine de Beauchamp, who built a new, strong castle.

Bedford traces its borough charter in 1166 by Henry II and elected two members to the unreformed House of Commons. The new Bedford Castle was razed in 1224 and today only a mound remains. From the 16th century Bedford and much of Bedfordshire became one of the main centres of England's lace industry, and lace continued to be an important industry in Bedford until the early 20th century. In 1660 John Bunyan was imprisoned for 12 years in Bedford Gaol. It was here that he wrote The Pilgrim's Progress. The River Great Ouse became navigable as far as Bedford in 1689. Wool declined in importance with brewing becoming a major industry in the town. The 19th century saw Bedford transform into an important engineering hub. The northern part of the town was badly damaged in the Great Fire of Bedford in 1802, which destroyed 72 properties in the St Loyes area. 21 years later, the Great Flood of Bedford swamped most of the town when the River Great Ouse burst its banks. The former Phoenix public house in St Johns Street has a stone marker in its wall almost two metres above ground level, representing the maximum height of the floodwater in 1823. In 1832 gas lighting was introduced, and the railway reached Bedford in 1846. The first corn exchange was built 1849, and the first drains and sewers were dug in 1864.

Bedford's first woman town councillor was Mary Milligan who, in 1919, was also the secretary of the local Women's Citizens League.

== Governance ==
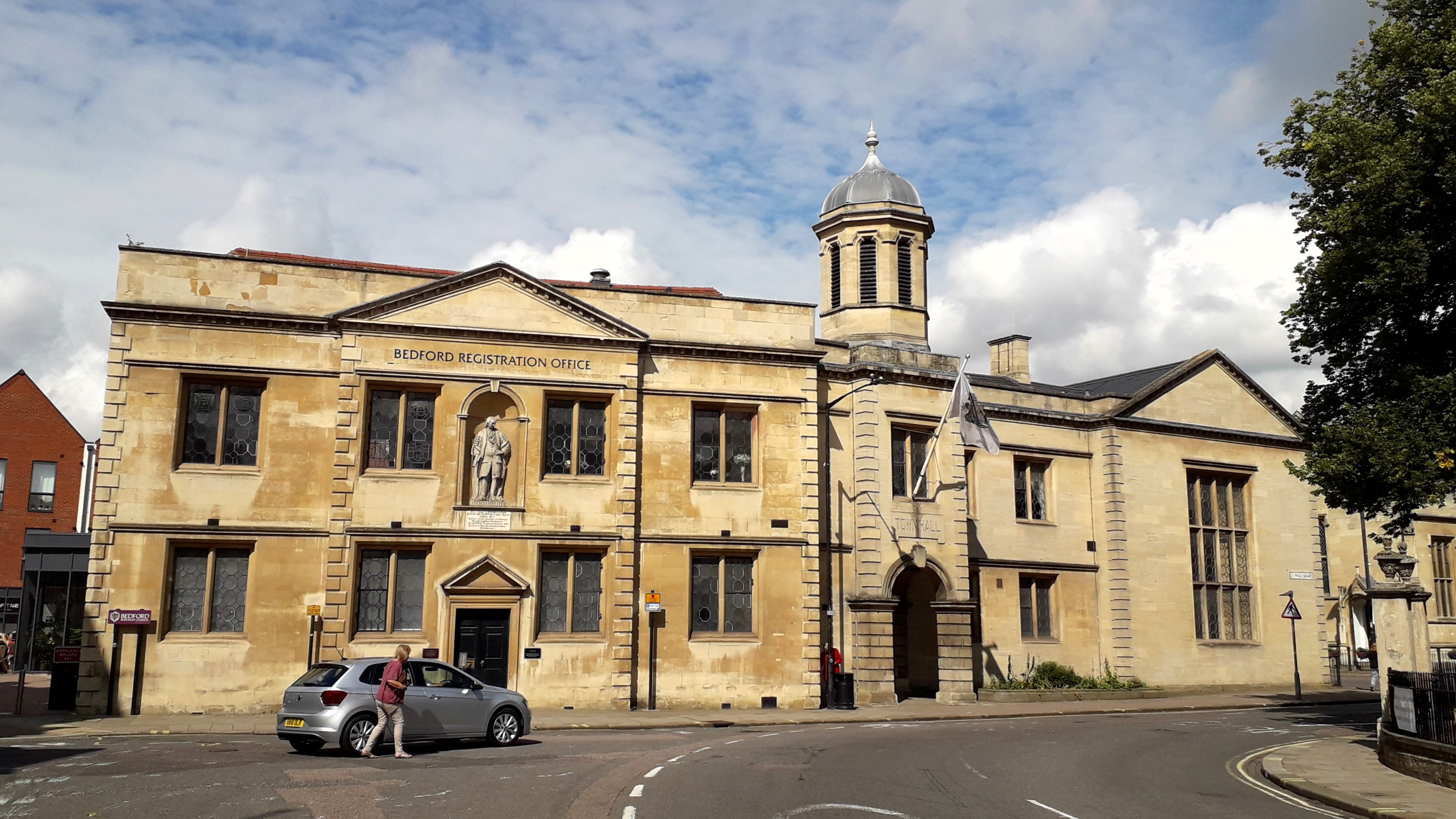
Old Town Hall, Bedford

The contiguous Bedford built-up area forms the largest settlement in the wider Borough of Bedford. The borough council is led by a directly elected mayor who holds the title 'Mayor of Bedford', an office which was first held by Frank Branston, until his death in 2009. The current mayor of Bedford is Tom Wootton from the Conservative Party.

The Bedford built-up area is divided into 10 wards for elections to the Borough Council: Brickhill, Castle, Cauldwell, De Parys, Goldington, Harpur, Kingsbrook, Newnham, Putnoe, Queens Park, Kempston East and Kempston West. Within the Bedford urban area, only Brickhill, Biddenham and Kempston elect their own parish councils, while the rest (and majority) of the built-up area is unparished. Kempston is the only civil parish in both the built-up area and Borough of Bedford which has a town council.

Bedford is served by Bedfordshire Police The Chief Constable since January 2023 is Trevor Rodenhurst. The elected Bedfordshire Police and Crime Commissioner of that force is John Tizard.

Bedford forms part of the Bedford constituency, represented in the House of Commons of the United Kingdom Parliament. The current Member of Parliament (MP) for Bedford is Mohammad Yasin, who is a member of the Labour Party.

== Geography ==
Bedford is 46 miles (74 km) miles north-northwest of London, 65 miles (105 km) southeast of Birmingham, 25 miles (40 km) west of Cambridge and 19 miles (31 km) east-southeast of Northampton. The town of Kempston is part of Bedford's built-up area, as is the village of Biddenham. Other villages adjacent to, but outside of, the built-up area include Bromham, Elstow, Renhold and Ravensden. Wixams is a new town which is being developed to the south of Bedford. Villages in the Borough of Bedford, outside of the built-up area, with populations of more than 2,000 (as of 2005) include Clapham, Elstow, Oakley, Sharnbrook, Shortstown, Wilstead, and Wootton. There are also many smaller villages in the borough.

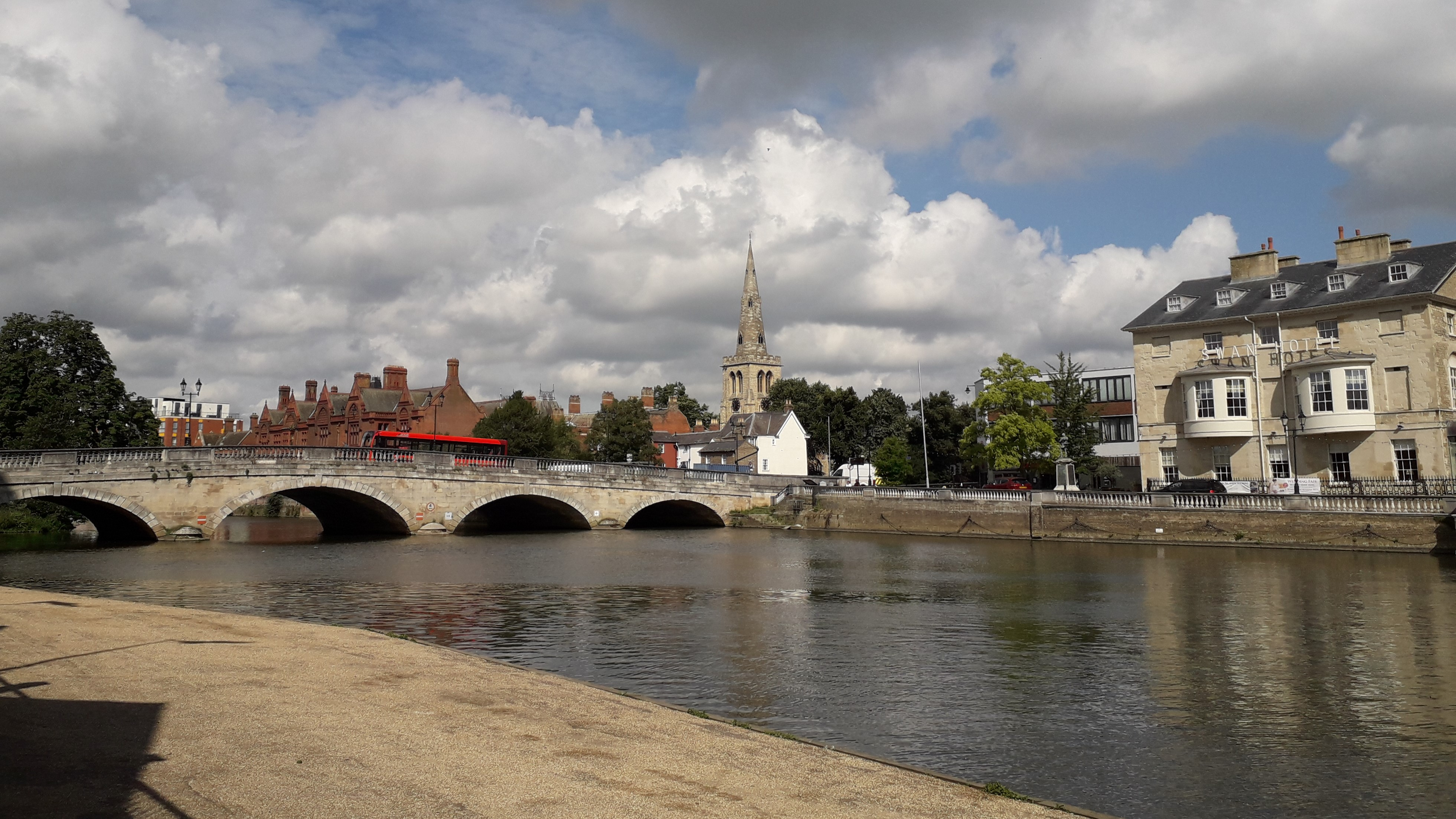
River Great Ouse at Town Bridge, Bedford looking towards St Paul's Church and the Swan Hotel.

== Climate ==
As with the rest of the United Kingdom, Bedford has a maritime climate, with a limited range of temperatures, and generally even rainfall throughout the year. The nearest Met Office weather station to Bedford is Bedford (Thurleigh) airport, about 6.5 miles (10.5 km) north of Bedford town centre at an elevation of 85 metres (279 ft). Temperature extremes at the site have ranged from 39.5 °C (103.1 °F) in July 2022, down to −15.3 °C (4.5 °F) in January 1982. However, such extremes would likely be superseded if longer-term records were available – Historically, the nearest weather station to Bedford was Cardington about 2.4 miles (3.9 km) south south east of the town centre with an elevation of 30 metres (98 ft). This location recorded a minimum of −18.3 °C (−0.9 °F) during January 1963.

Rainfall averages around 610 mm (24 in) a year, with an excess of 1 mm (0.04 in) falling on 115 days.

Sunshine at around 1,550 hours a year is typical of inland areas of southern-central England.

Climate data for Bedford (1991–2020 normals, extremes 1980–present)
Month	Jan	Feb	Mar	Apr	May	Jun	Jul	Aug	Sep	Oct	Nov	Dec	Year
Record high °C (°F)	14.9 (58.8)	18.6 (65.5)	22.4 (72.3)	27.1 (80.8)	33.0 (91.4)	34.4 (93.9)	39.5 (103.1)	36.2 (97.2)	32.1 (89.8)	28.1 (82.6)	17.6 (63.7)	15.7 (60.3)	39.5 (103.1)
Mean daily maximum °C (°F)	7.3 (45.1)	8.0 (46.4)	10.6 (51.1)	13.7 (56.7)	16.7 (62.1)	19.8 (67.6)	22.4 (72.3)	22.2 (72.0)	19.0 (66.2)	14.7 (58.5)	10.2 (50.4)	7.5 (45.5)	14.4 (57.9)
Daily mean °C (°F)	4.4 (39.9)	4.8 (40.6)	6.7 (44.1)	9.1 (48.4)	12.0 (53.6)	15.0 (59.0)	17.4 (63.3)	17.3 (63.1)	14.6 (58.3)	11.1 (52.0)	7.2 (45.0)	4.7 (40.5)	10.4 (50.7)
Mean daily minimum °C (°F)	1.5 (34.7)	1.5 (34.7)	2.8 (37.0)	4.5 (40.1)	7.3 (45.1)	10.2 (50.4)	12.3 (54.1)	12.3 (54.1)	10.2 (50.4)	7.5 (45.5)	4.2 (39.6)	1.9 (35.4)	6.4 (43.5)
Record low °C (°F)	−15.9 (3.4)	−14.0 (6.8)	−6.9 (19.6)	−5.7 (21.7)	−2.1 (28.2)	1.8 (35.2)	4.9 (40.8)	5.0 (41.0)	2.0 (35.6)	−3.7 (25.3)	−7.9 (17.8)	−15.0 (5.0)	−15.9 (3.4)
Average precipitation mm (inches)	52.4 (2.06)	40.1 (1.58)	37.3 (1.47)	44.3 (1.74)	47.0 (1.85)	50.3 (1.98)	51.2 (2.02)	58.7 (2.31)	50.0 (1.97)	65.3 (2.57)	56.9 (2.24)	55.2 (2.17)	608.6 (23.96)
Average precipitation days (≥ 1.0 mm)	11.1	9.3	9.0	9.1	8.5	8.8	9.2	8.9	8.6	10.3	11.0	11.0	114.8
Mean monthly sunshine hours	62.8	84.7	117.5	157.8	195.0	189.0	200.6	184.8	143.5	107.6	66.6	58.5	1,568.3
Source 1: Met Office
Source 2: Starlings Roost Weather

== Demographics ==
Population pyramid in 2021

Bedford is home to one of the largest concentrations of Italian immigrants in the United Kingdom. According to the 2001 census, almost 30% of Bedford's population were of at least partial Italian descent. This is mainly as a result of labour recruitment in the early 1950s by the London Brick Company from Southern Italy. From 1954 to 2008 Bedford had its own Italian vice-consulate.

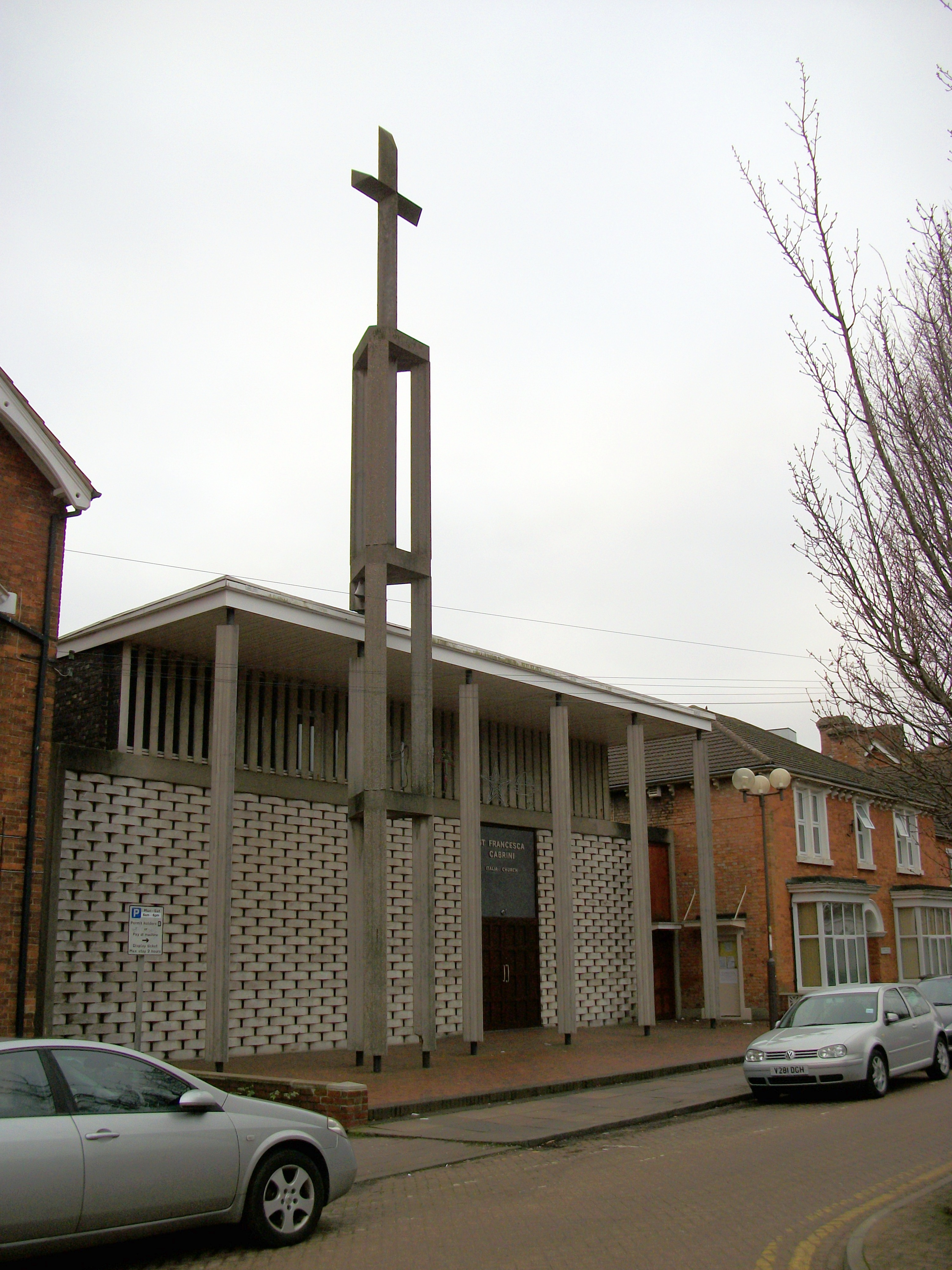
St Frances Cabrini Italian Church, Woburn Road, Bedford

At the 2011 Census, the ethnic mix of the Bedford urban area was 74.4% white, 4% mixed, 15% Asian or Asian-British, 5% Black or Black-British, and 1% "other ethnic group". In terms of national identity, just over 50% identified as English only, 24% as British only and 15% only as a non-UK identity; just over 8% had a "British and other" identity.

Religious groups in Bedford (2001−2021)
Religious group	2021		2011		2001	
Religious group	Pop.	%	Pop.	%	Pop.	%
Christian	88,178	47.61%	93,346	59.28%	101,720	68.77%
Muslim	13,059	7.05%	8,610	5.47%	4,803	3.25%
Sikh	4,114	2.22%	3,336	2.12%	2,740	1.85%
Hindu	3,045	1.64%	2,420	1.54%	2,567	1.74%
Buddhist	629	0.34%	509	0.32%	355	0.24%
Jewish	232	0.13%	171	0.11%	180	0.12%
Other religion	2,014	1.09%	1,506	0.96%	432	0.29%
Irreligious	73,954	39.93%	47,581	30.21%	35,114	23.74%
Total responses	185,225	100%	157,479	100%	147,911	100%

== Landmarks ==
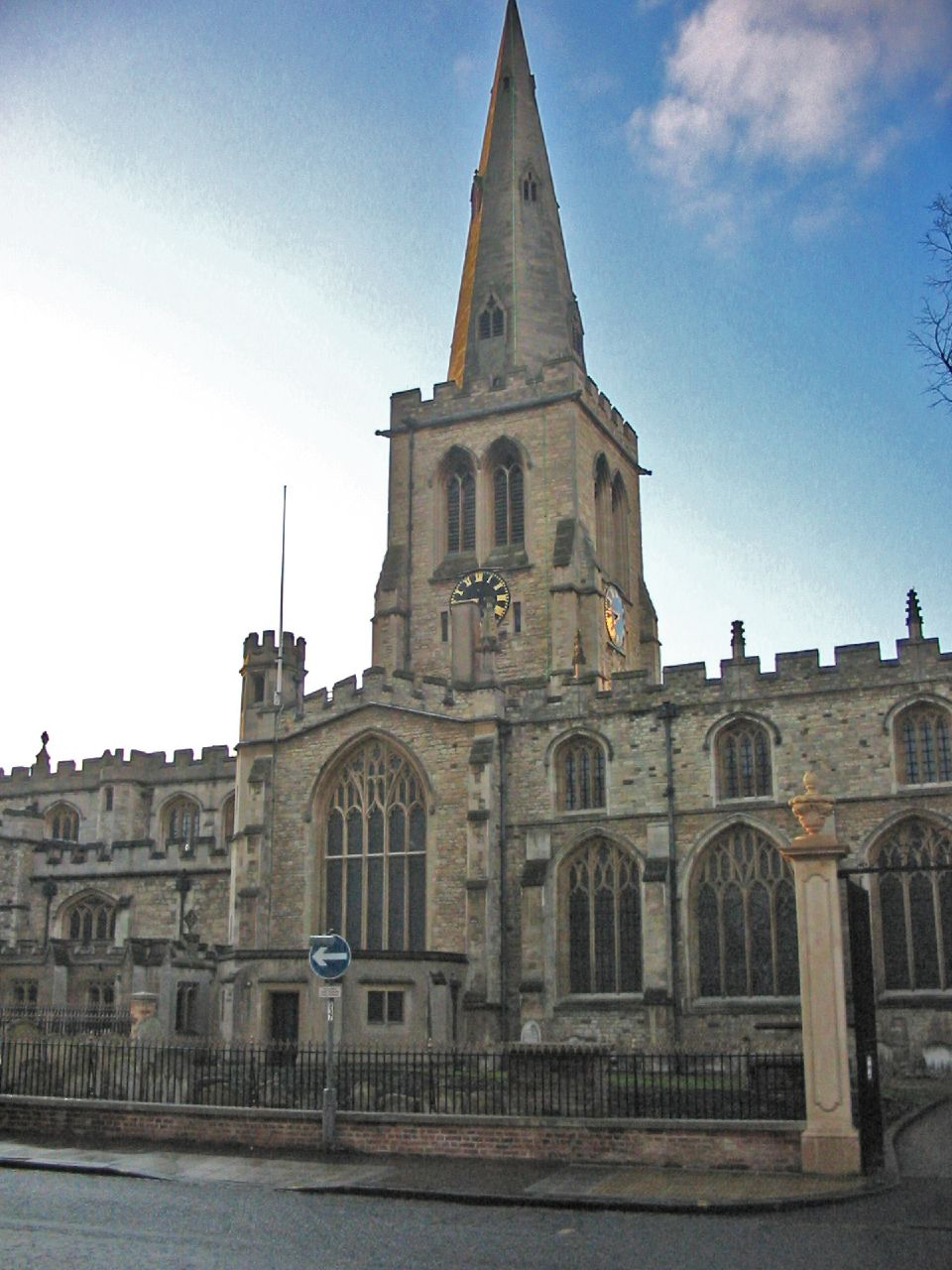
St Paul's Church

Bedford Park is the town's largest urban park and is located directly to the north of the town centre. The park retains many original features from its Victorian design and construction, including a cricket pavilion and bandstand which are both still in use. Priory Country Park is a large country park located on the northern bank of the River Great Ouse in eastern Bedford. Both parks have been awarded Green Flag status.

Bedford's principal church is St Paul's, in the square of the same name at the historic centre of the town. It is the Civic Church of the Borough of Bedford and County of Bedfordshire and has a tall, iconic spire which is one of the dominant features of the town. There was an early Minster church on the site by 1066 and work on the present structure began in the early 13th century, but little remains from that period. John Bunyan and John Wesley both preached in the church. In 1865–1868 the tower and spire were completely rebuilt and the two transepts added and lesser alterations have been made since. From 1941 to the end of the Second World War the BBC's daily service was broadcast from St Paul's. Another notable local church is St Peter's, on St Peter's Street, which contains some of the oldest architectural remains in Bedford, the most ancient being the two monoliths. St Paul's Church also hosts the town's Visitor Information Centre.

Just outside the town lie the Cardington airship hangars. The hangars have been used to shoot scenes for movies such as Star Wars, Batman Begins, The Dark Knight, and Inception. The hangars can be seen from the Bedford Bypass.

Despite being far upriver from the sea, seals have occasionally been reported as swimming as far inland as Bedford.

The Old Town Hall dates back to 1550 and the building was originally constructed as a school.

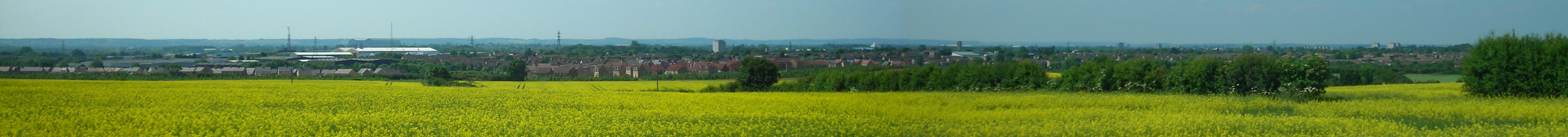
View of the Bedford skyline, taken from Renhold in 2013

=== River Great Ouse ===
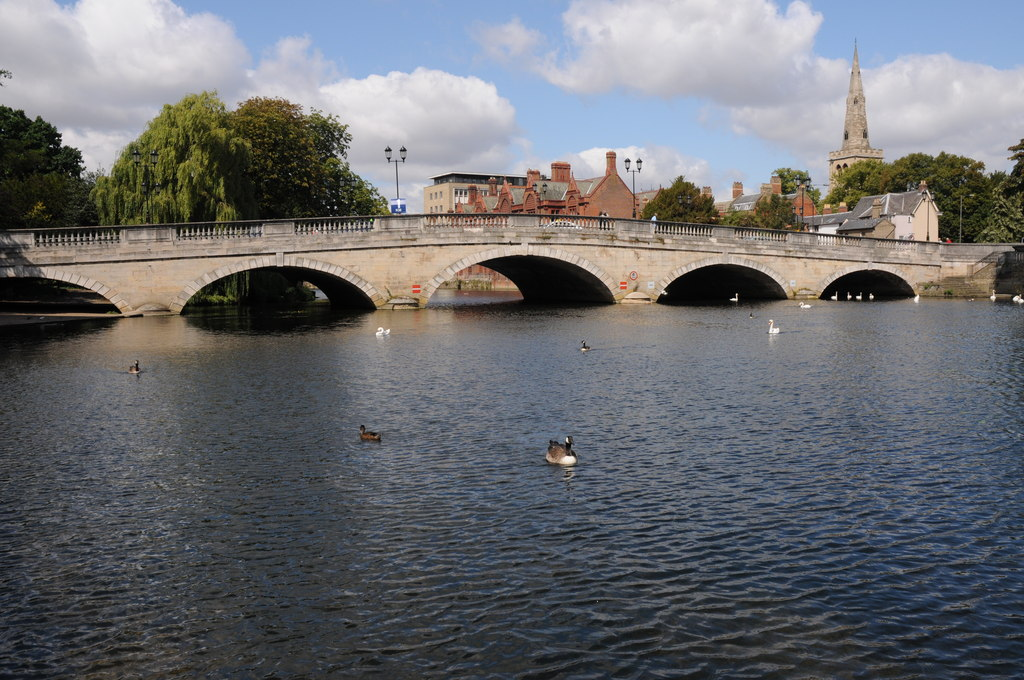
The Town Bridge over the Great Ouse

The River Great Ouse passes through the town centre and is lined with gardens known as the Embankment. Within these gardens, opposite Rothsay Road, stands a war memorial to the men of the town killed in the First World War. The memorial was designed in 1921 by the sculptor Charles Sargeant Jagger and depicts the Anglo Saxon Lady Athelflaed, who ruled Mercia, killing a dragon.

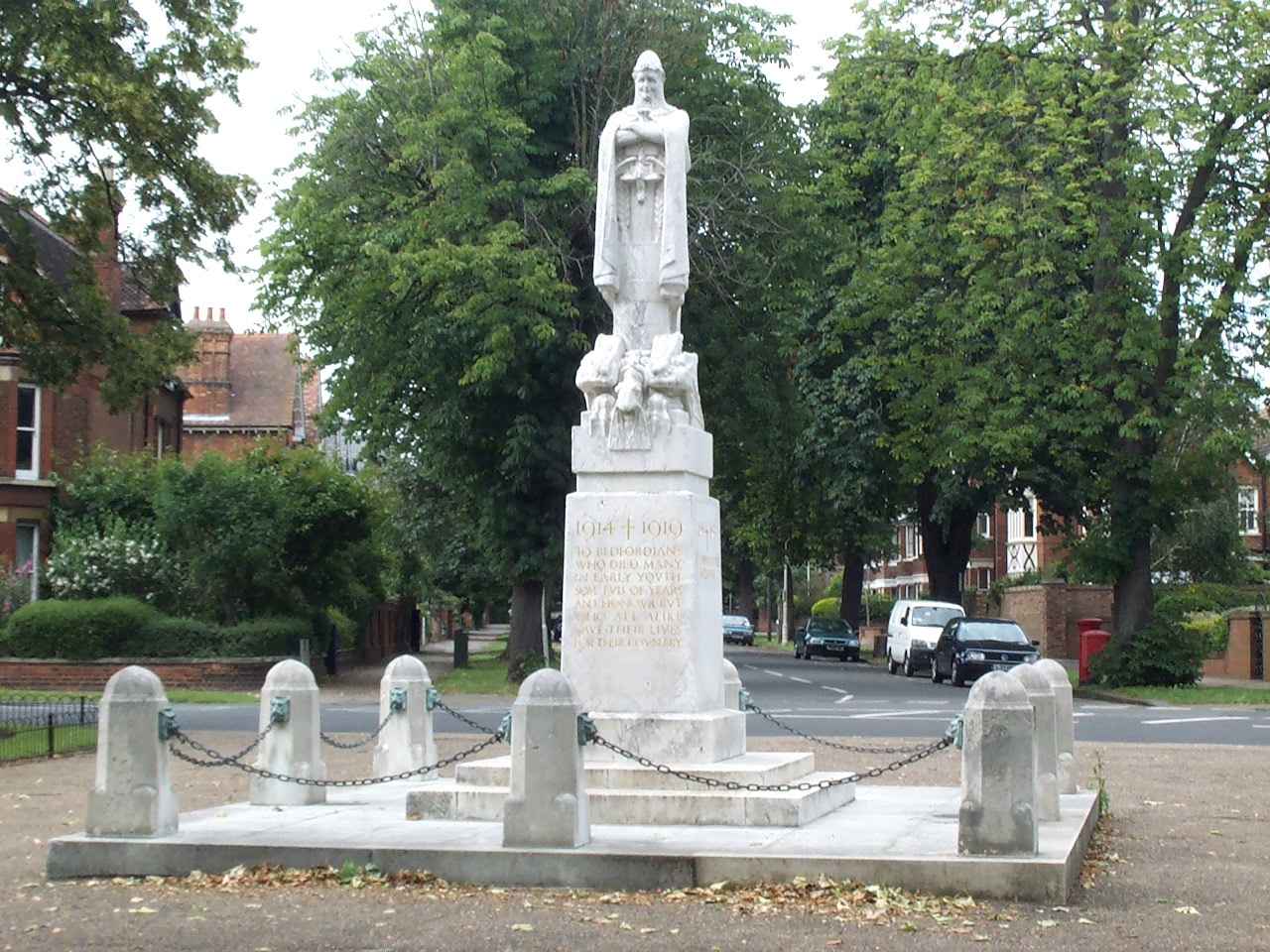
Bedford War Memorial

The inscription reads

1914 † 1919
TO BEDFORDIANS WHO DIED, MANY IN EARLY YOUTH, SOME FULL OF YEARS AND HONOUR, BUT WHO ALL ALIKE GAVE THEIR LIVES FOR THEIR COUNTRY.

=== Bedford Castle ===
Bedford Castle Mound is the remnant of Bedford's medieval castle, located close to the centre of the modern town, less than a hundred yards from Bedford Bridge and the High Street. In around 2000, Bedford Borough Council built a sloping retaining wall on the south side, facing the river. Although almost completely modern, the wall does incorporate a few pieces of historic masonry. A paved path leads round the side of the mound up to the top, which is a flat circular grassy area. A small wooden structure of the same date at the top of the wall, much like a bus shelter, protects tourists from the rain while they view the river embankment. There is a man-made chamber inside the Castle Mound. It was built by the Higgins family in the mid-1800s and would have been used to store ice throughout the year. The central well is over 4m deep, large enough to have stored ice for use in all of the inns of Bedford when it was built.

== Transport ==
=== Railway ===
There are two stations in Bedford. The main Bedford railway station is on the Midland Main Line, providing inter-city services to London St Pancras and the East Midlands, operated by East Midlands Railway. Stopping services, operated by Thameslink, run through London to Gatwick Airport and Brighton. Bedford's other lesser used station is Bedford St John's which in on the Marston Vale Line. Services are operated by London North Western Railway and run between Bletchley and Bedford's main station.

=== Road ===
Road access to and from the town is provided by the A6 and A421 roads; the former connects the town with Kettering to the north-west, and Luton to the south, whilst the latter connects the town with Milton Keynes and the M1 (at Junction 13) to the west, and the A1 to the east (near St Neots) via a bypass, with both being around 10 miles (16 km) away. Other roads that serve or skirt the town include the A422, which runs westwards into Milton Keynes (also connecting to the M1 at Junction 14 via the A509), and the A428, which runs between Coventry and Cambridge.

The new Greyfriars surface car park and the refurbished Allhallows multi-storey car park both implement a pay on foot system. Greyfriars occupies 142 parking spaces, including 7 designated disabled spaces, although there is a 2-hour per day parking limit.

=== Buses ===
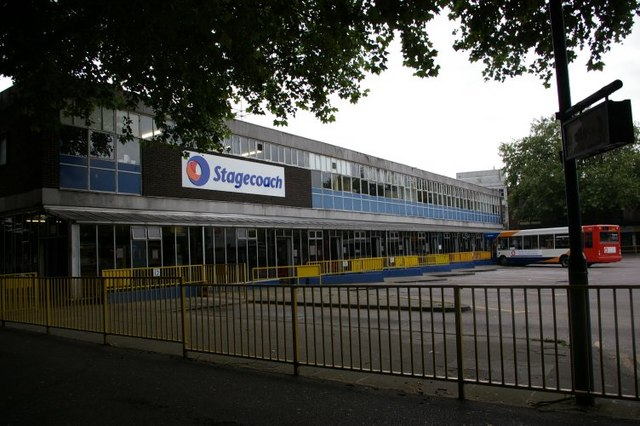
Bedford bus station in July 2007

Bedford bus station serves the town and was reopened on 29 March 2015, after undergoing £8.8million regeneration which began in 2013. The main operators in and around the town are Stagecoach East and Stagecoach Midlands.

== Education ==
Bedford Borough previously operated a three-tier education system, which was arranged into lower, middle and upper schools, as recommended in the Plowden Report of 1967. The arrangement was put to the vote in 2006 with a view to moving to the two-tier model, but was rejected. On 17 November 2009, borough councillors voted 19 to 17 in favour of a two tier system, which would then be phased in. However, following the defeat of the Labour Government in 2010, the new coalition government announced that the funding necessary for the switch to a two-tier system would no longer be available. As a result, the switch proceeded on a school by school basis as national funding was due to cover most of the cost. However, in July 2015, the council announced the intention to support the transition to a system of two tier education across the whole borough in a coordinated way. At the time, only the Wootton cluster of schools chose not to transition. As of September 2018, all of the borough's schools have converted to two-tier. The secondary schools currently operating in the borough are Bedford Academy, Bedford Free School, Biddenham International School, Castle Newnham School, Goldington Academy, Mark Rutherford School and St Thomas More Catholic School.

Bedford is home to four private schools run by the Harpur Trust charity, endowed by Bedfordian Sir William Harpur in the 16th century. These are:

- Bedford School for boys aged 7–18
- Bedford Modern School, a former boys' school which became co-educational in 2003 for pupils aged 7–18
- Bedford Girls' School for girls aged 7–18. (Merged September 2012 – Formerly Bedford High School for Girls and Dame Alice Harpur School)
- Pilgrims Pre-Preparatory School

Smaller private institutions include Bedford Greenacre Independent School (boys and girls aged 3–18), and Polam School (boys and girls aged 12 months to 9 years), neither of which are part of the Harpur Trust.

Bedford hosts a campus of the University of Bedfordshire, which prior to a merger with the University of Luton in 2006 had been a campus of De Montfort University (itself now solely based in Leicester). For further education, the town is served by Bedford College and The Bedford Sixth Form. Additionally, Stella Mann College is a private college, which offers a range of further education courses relating to the performing arts.

== Religious sites ==
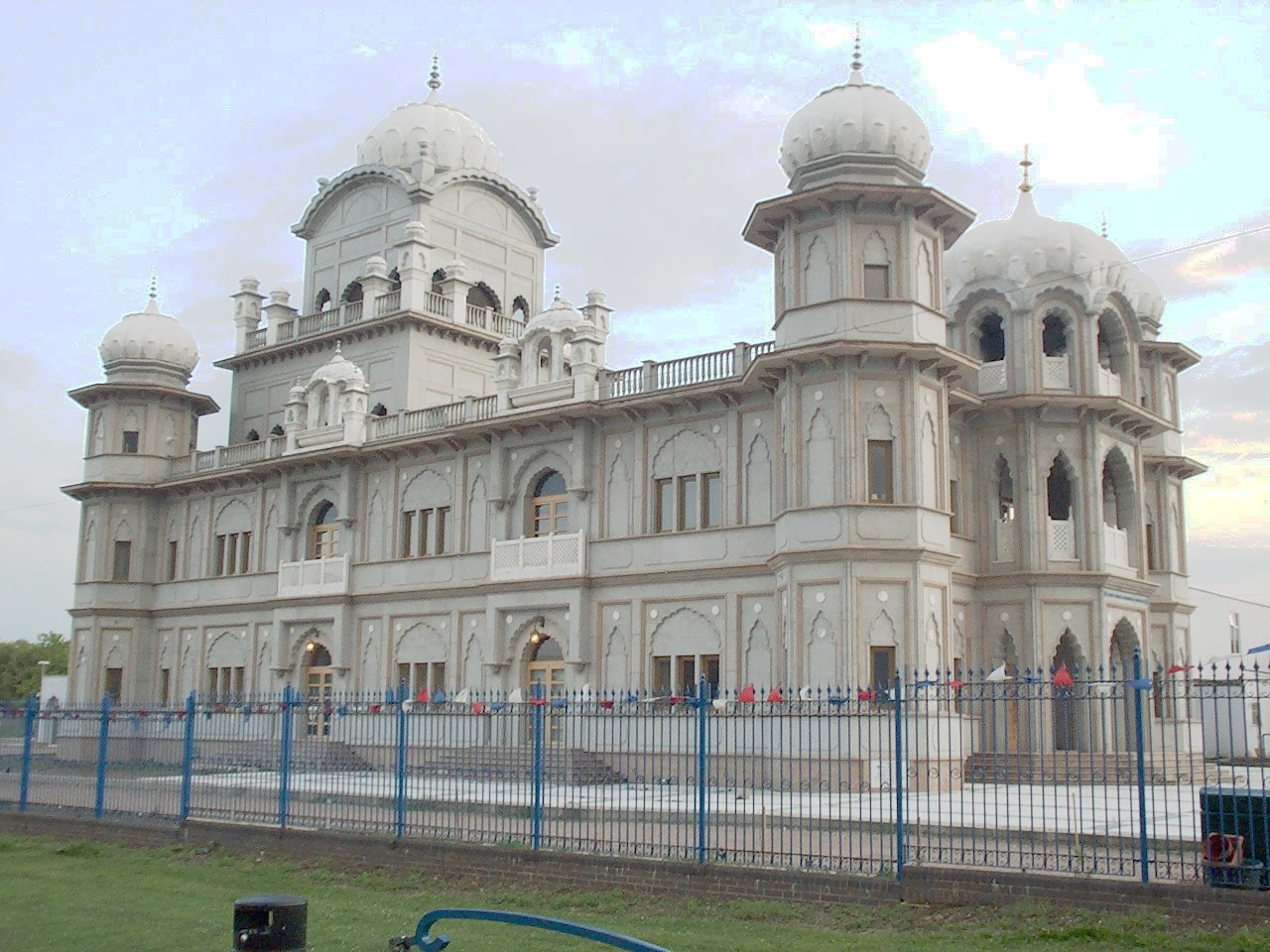
The Guru Nanak Gurdwara in Queens Park

The town has a high number of places of worship, including the Civic and County Church of St Paul's and the Church of St Peter's. There are three from the Newfrontiers network, as well as Polish, Arab, Portuguese, Spanish and Italian Roman Catholic churches, LDS (Mormon) meeting houses, Greek, Russian and other Orthodox churches, Presbyterian churches, Lutheran churches, Baptist churches, Evangelical churches, Methodist churches, Protestant churches, Anglican churches and various independent churches and other places of worship that cater to the different ethnic, racial, and language groups. There are four Islamic mosques in the town. There are also Buddhist and Hindu temples in the town.

Bedford has the largest Sikh gurdwara in the United Kingdom outside London, alongside two other Sikh gurdwaras; one of which is in Kempston. Bedford has Guru Ravidass and Valmiki temples.

There are Quaker, Jehovah's Witness and Wiccan communities who meet and have their own places of worship in the town. There is no longer a synagogue in Bedford, but Bedfordshire Progressive Synagogue, based in Luton, meets in Bedford once a month for the town's Jewish community. The nearest Orthodox synagogue is the Luton United Synagogue, a Lubavitch synagogue in Luton. Bedford is the former headquarters of the Panacea Society, founded in 1919, who believed that the town would have an important role in the Second Coming of Jesus Christ, and that Bedford was the original location of the Garden of Eden.

== Culture ==
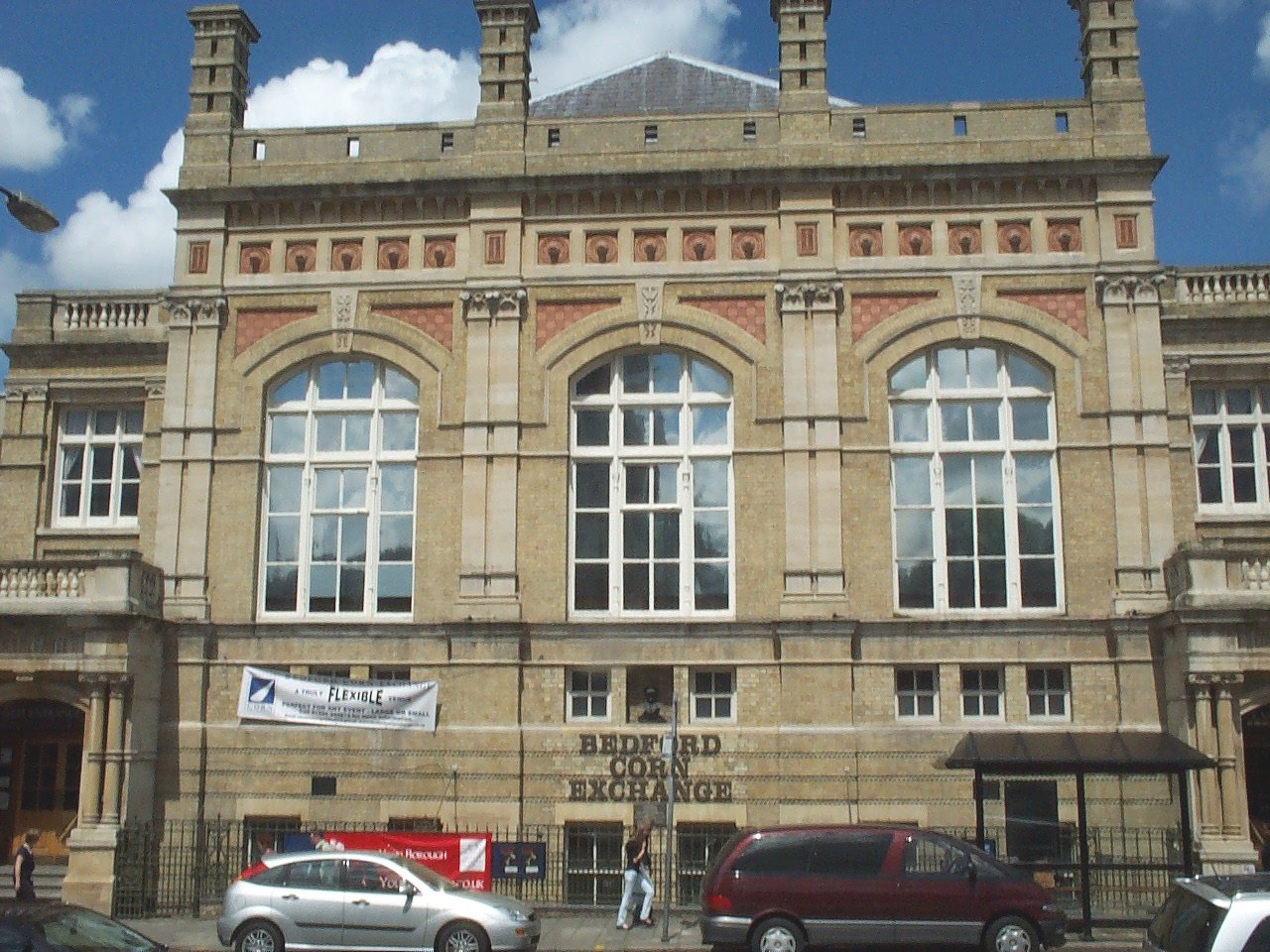
Bedford Corn Exchange

The Higgins Art Gallery & Museum, Bedford is housed in the recreated Victorian home of the Higgins family of Victorian brewers and in a modern extension. The museum has local history collections, while the galleries have notable collections of watercolours, prints and drawings, ceramics, glass and lace.

Bedford contains several works of public art, most notably the Statue of John Bunyan, the Statue of John Howard, and Reflections of Bedford, a statue by British sculptor Rick Kirby.

The Panacea Museum tells the story of the Panacea Society, a religious community formed in the early twentieth century.

The Bedford Corn Exchange is the largest entertainment venue in the town and plays host to a variety of performances, meetings, conferences, concerts and private functions. The venue has been host to many great entertainers such as Glenn Miller and Bob Hope.

The University of Bedfordshire Theatre is the largest theatre in Bedford and hosts many larger productions as well as projects from the university. There is an active amdram (community theatre) scene, with groups such as the Swan Theatre Company, Bedford Drama Company (formerly Bedford Dramatic Club), Bedford Marianettes and ShowCo Bedford producing plays and musicals in venues like the Place Theatre and the Corn Exchange. The Bedford Pantomime Company produces a traditional pantomime at the Bedford Corn Exchange each Christmas. Esquires (one of the town's premier live music venues) regularly plays host to many notable bands and acts from all over the United Kingdom as well as showcasing local live music.

Every two years, an event called the "Bedford River Festival" is held near the river in Bedford during early July. The event lasts for two days and regularly attracts about 250,000 visitors. The event includes sports, funfairs and live music. It is the second-largest regular outdoor event in the United Kingdom, beaten in numbers only by the Notting Hill Carnival. The Bedford Regatta each May is Britain's largest one-day river rowing regatta.

Other annual events include "Bedford by the Sea" (when large quantities of sand are deposited in the town centre), the "Bedford International Kite Festival" and "Bedford Festival of Motoring" in June. "Proms in the Park", held in early August, is a popular musical event.

Bedford's special brand of the ordinary has resulted in regular small TV and radio appearances, for instance the upbeat episode of Mark Steel's in Town, contrasting with the less enthusiastic treatment in The Late Show with Stephen Colbert. The "Bedford of Bedfordshire's Community Calendar" segment of this US show featured Bedford-bred John Oliver.

== Tourism ==
In December 2023, Universal Destinations & Experiences announced that it had purchased 480 acres (later expanded to around 700 acres) of land on a former brickworks site near Stewartby, on the outskirts of Bedford, with the company exploring the possibility of building a theme park and resort in the area, citing Bedford's proximity to London and Luton Airport.

Permission to begin construction of Universal United Kingdom was given in December 2025, with an anticipated completion date in 2031. The East West Rail Company said a new railway station would be built to serve the park in Stewartby and National Highways confirmed there would be upgrades to the transport network in the area, which would include a new link road off the A421.

== New technologies ==
Following successful rollouts of autonomous delivery robots in nearby Milton Keynes, Northampton and Cambridgeshire by Starship Technologies, in July 2022, the company announced a partnership with Bedford Borough Council and The Co-operative Group to rollout the autonomous robots in the Bedford built-up area, delivering from three Co-op stores in Goldington, Queens Drive and Kempston, an area spanning 45,000 residents and 20,000 households.

== Media ==
=== Television ===
Local news and televisions programmes are provided by BBC East and ITV Anglia from the Sandy Heath TV transmitter.

=== Radio ===
Local radio stations are BBC Three Counties Radio on 95.5 FM, Heart East on 96.9 FM, Greatest Hits Radio Bucks, Beds and Herts on 96.2 FM, In2beats on 106.5 FM and Bedford Radio which is the local radio station.

=== Newspaper ===
The town has two local newspapers, the Times & Citizen and the Bedford Independent, with both being distributed freely across the Borough of Bedford and neighboring settlements within Central Bedfordshire.

== Sport ==
There is a long-standing sporting heritage in the Bedford borough with long-established rugby and football clubs. The town has four rugby union teams called Bedford Blues, Bedford Queens, Bedford Swifts and Bedford Athletic. Since 2004, Bedford also has a rugby league team, Bedford Tigers, who compete one tier below the National Conference.

Taking into account the size of its overall urban area, Bedford is one of the largest towns in England without a fully professional football team. Bedford Town F.C. currently plays at the sixth level of the English football league system and Real Bedford F.C. play at the eighth level.

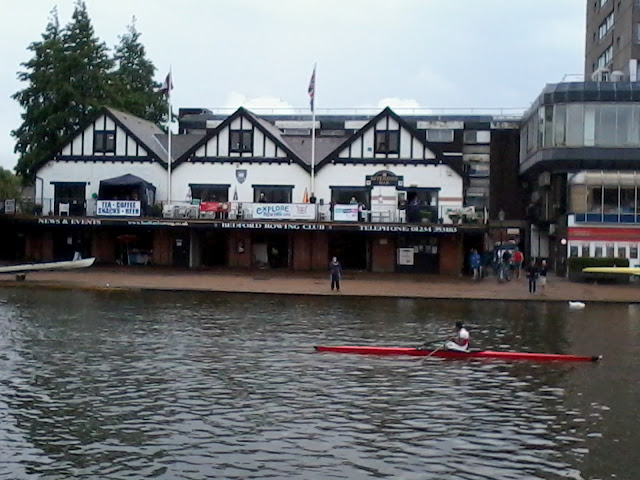
Bedford Rowing Club boathouse

Rowing is also a major part of the sports scene with a number of regatta events hosted throughout the year from February to October; the most significant of these being Bedford Regatta which, in terms of numbers of crews participating, is the second largest in the country. It was on Bedford's River Great Ouse that Olympic rower, Tim Foster, honed his skills as a student of Bedford Modern and member of star club; indeed the borough has produced many other champions of sport past and present including Stephanie Cook, Gail Emms, Liz Yelling and Paula Radcliffe who is Life Vice-President of Bedford & County Athletic Club

Viking Kayak Club organise the Bedford Kayak Marathon with canoe racing held along the Embankment on Bedford's riverside and organise national ranking canoe slalom events at the Cardington Artificial Slalom Course (CASC), which was the first artificial whitewater course in the United Kingdom. CASC is also the venue each year for the United Kingdom's National Inter Clubs Slalom Finals, the largest canoe slalom event by participation in the United Kingdom. Etienne Stott – 2012 Olympic Gold Medallist's Club.

Bedford Borough was a major host of national teams preparing for the 2012 Summer Olympics and Paralympics. The Maldives National Olympic Committee based its competing athletes in the borough, while Paralympic athletes from Angola, the Central African Republic, Democratic Republic of the Congo, the Gambia, Ghana, Ivory Coast, Jamaica, Lesotho, Morocco, Niger, Pakistan, Senegal, Tunisia and Uganda were also based in the area. With the exception of Weymouth (which hosted various sailing events), Bedford Borough accommodated more Olympic teams in 2012 than any other local authority area in the United Kingdom.

== Filmography ==
- The popular BBC TV series Some Mothers Do 'Ave 'Em was filmed in and around Bedford during the 1970s.
- A 2017 feature on The Late Show with Stephen Colbert called "Bedford of Bedfordshire's Community Calendar", in which John Oliver, who grew up in Bedford, described the town as 'scrappy'. The segment featured the Shuttleworth Collection, the Forest of Marston Vale, the Place Theatre, the Bedford Corn Exchange and local bookshop Rogan's Books, among others.

== Public services ==
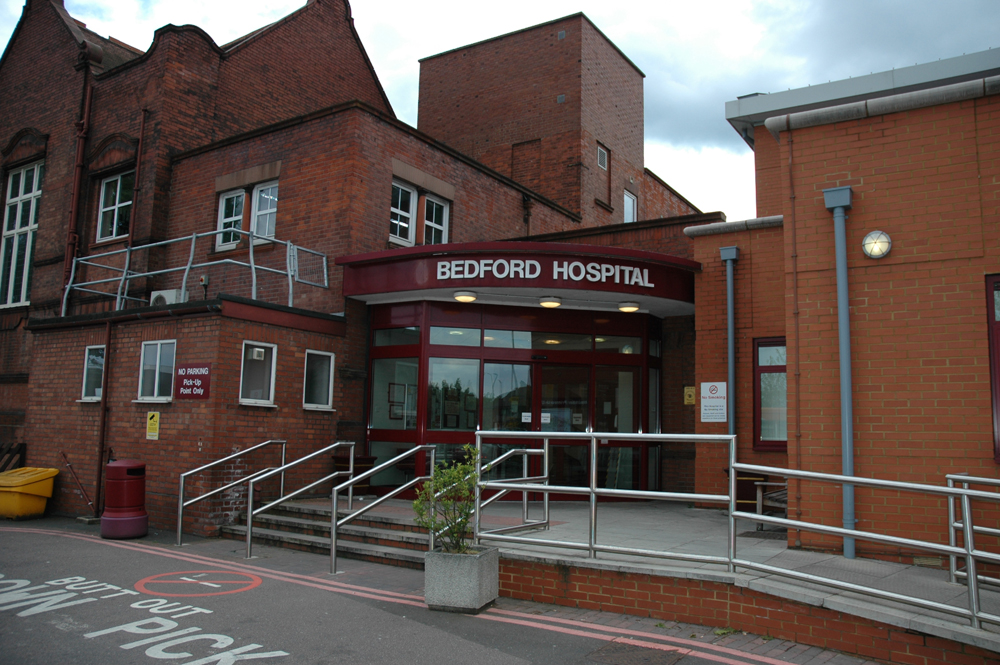
Bedford Hospital

Bedford Hospital is a district general hospital that operates from two sites in the town, providing a wide range of services, although patients requiring advanced health services are referred to specialist units elsewhere, particularly Addenbrooke's Hospital in Cambridge, which has a partnership with Bedford Hospital. Bedford Hospital's catchment area is based on the Borough of Bedford and parts of Central Bedfordshire.

Bedfordshire Police is responsible for policing in Bedford, and operates a main police station in the town centre. Fire and rescue services in Bedford are coordinated by the Bedfordshire Fire and Rescue Service. Bedford's fire station is in the Newnham area of the town and is staffed 24 hours a day.

== Gallery ==
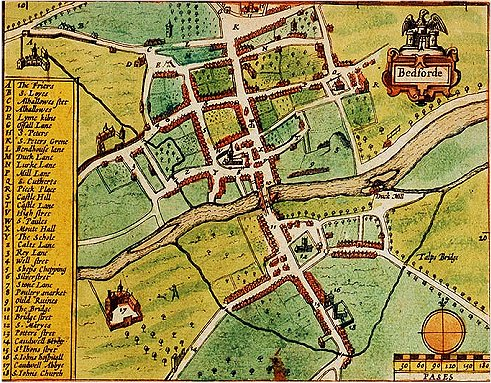
Bedford in 1611

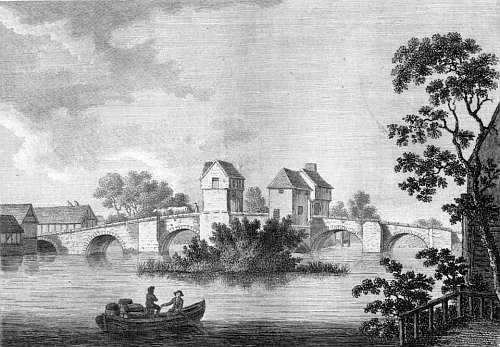
Bedford Bridge in 1783. This version of the bridge was replaced in 1813.

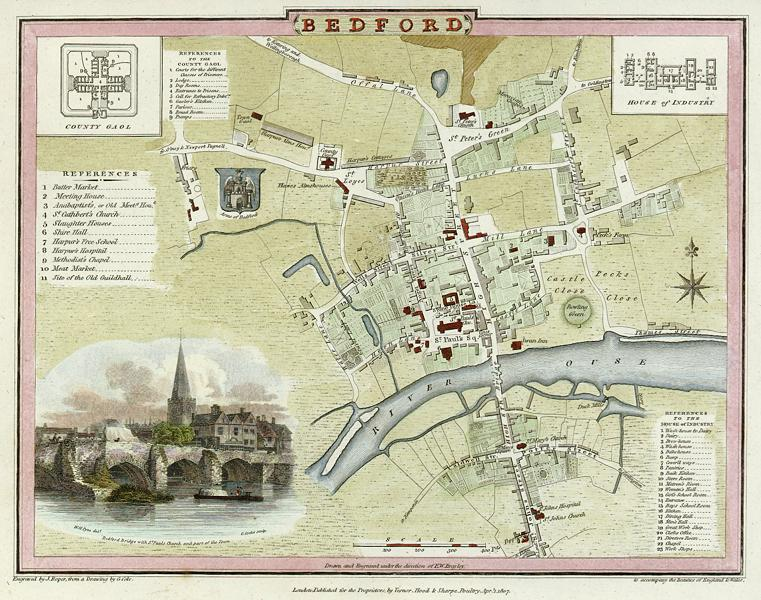
Bedford in 1806

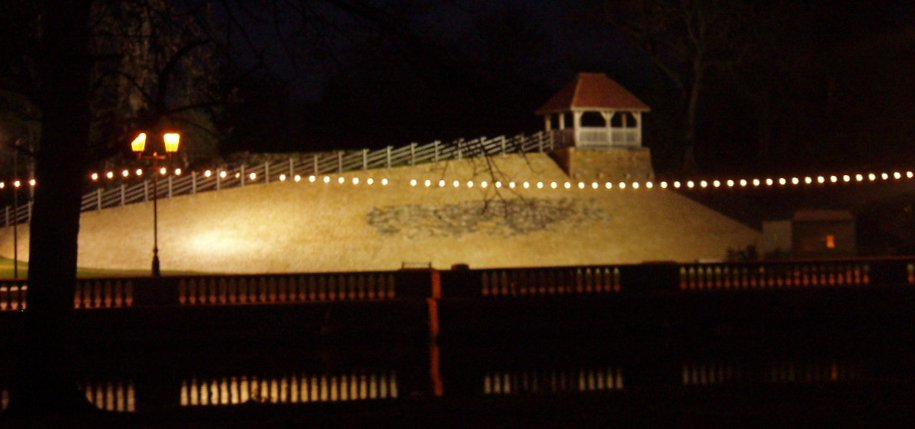
Bedford Castle Hill

== See also ==
- Transport in Bedford
- Healthcare in Bedfordshire
- List of twin towns and sister cities in the United Kingdom
