= Bedford bus station =

Bus station in Bedford, England

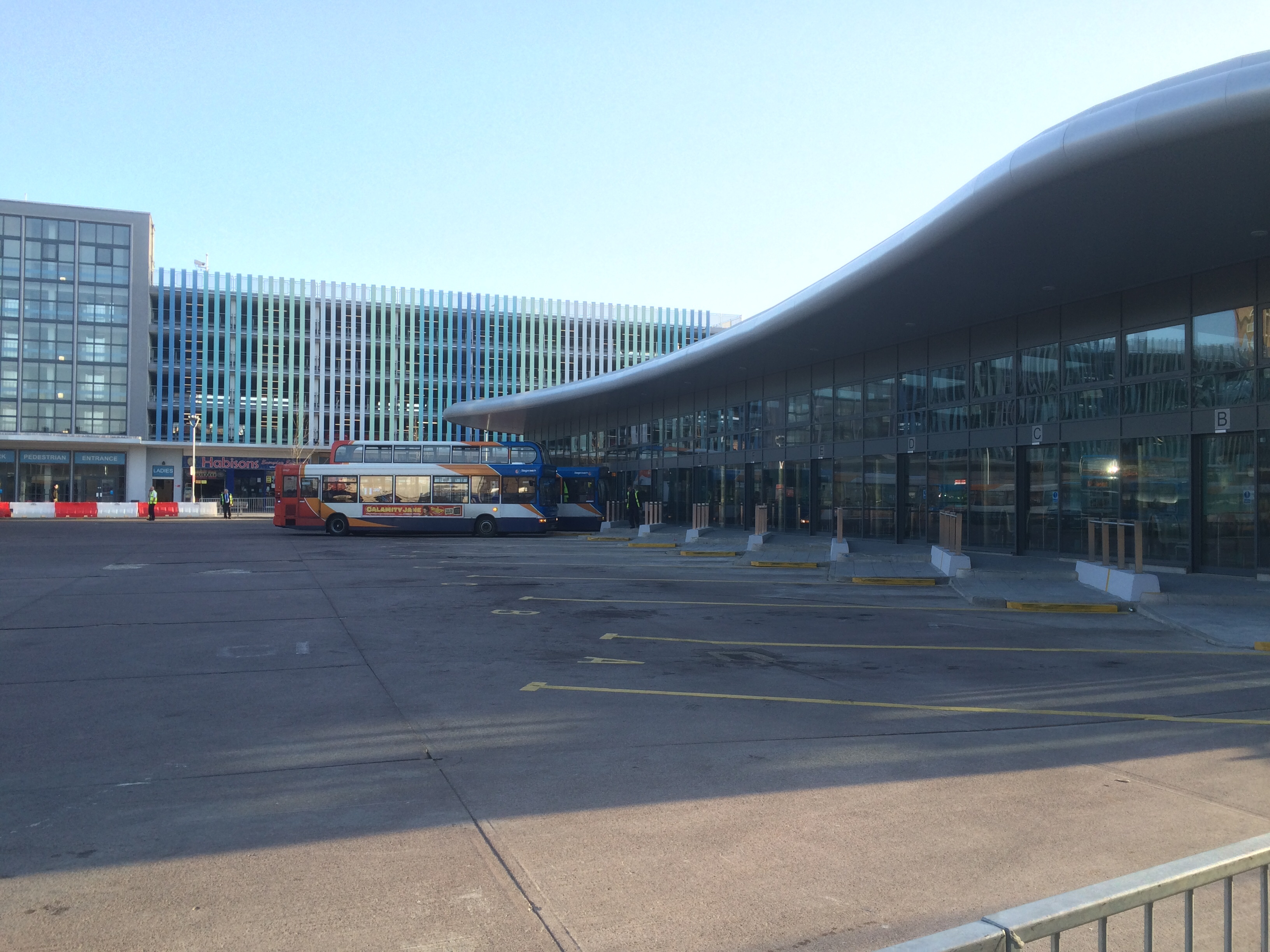
- The new Bedford bus station

General information
- Location: All Hallows, Bedford
- Coordinates: 52.13749°N 0.4616°W
- Ordnance Survey: TL0538549915
- Operator: Stagecoach in Bedford
- Bus stands: 12
- Bus operators: Stagecoach in Bedford, Stagecoach in Northants, Grant palmer, Cedar Coaches, Flittabus, Ivel Sprinter
- Connections: Bedford railway station (600 metres)
Location

Bedford bus station serves the town of Bedford, Bedfordshire, England. The bus station is part owned by the Stagecoach in Bedford and Bedford Borough Council and is situated in the town centre on All Hallows just off Greyfriars.

The main operator at Bedford bus station is Stagecoach in Bedford. Other operators include Stagecoach in Northants, Grant Palmer, Cedar Coaches, Flittabus and Ivel Sprinter.

== History ==
The bus station and adjacent multi storey car park were originally constructed in the 1960s. The bus station replaced one on The Broadway. In 2012, plans were launched to redevelop the Bedford bus station as part of the Town Centre's renovation plan.

In June 2013, plans to rebuild the bus station were approved by the local council. The rebuilt bus station opened in March 2015.

== Services ==
Bus services run from the bus station around the town. Services go as far afield as Kettering, Northampton, Milton Keynes, Oxford, Luton, Hitchin, Sandy, Biggleswade and Cambridge.

National Express services also call at the bus station. (Services 305 Southend-Liverpool, 314 Cambridge-Birmingham/Southport and 326 Newcastle-Cambridge)

Stagecoach X5

== Gallery ==
The former bus station

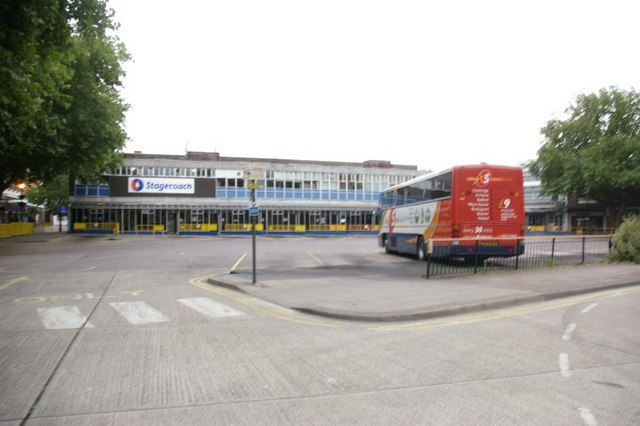
Service X5 laying over at the bus station

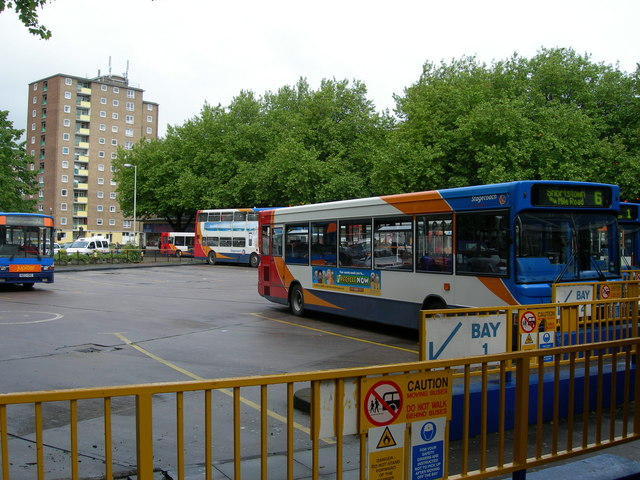
Bus waiting at a bay at the bus station

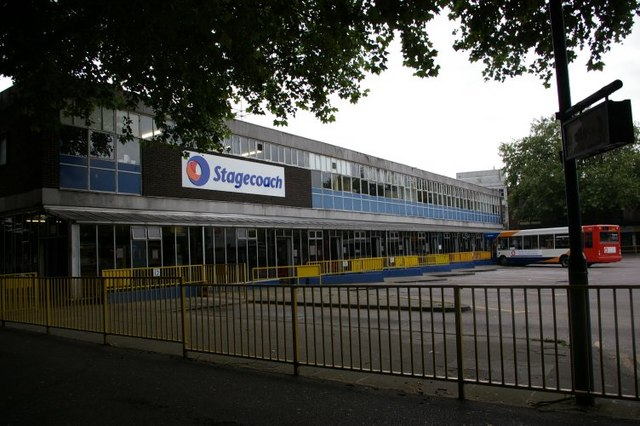
A view of the former Bedford bus station

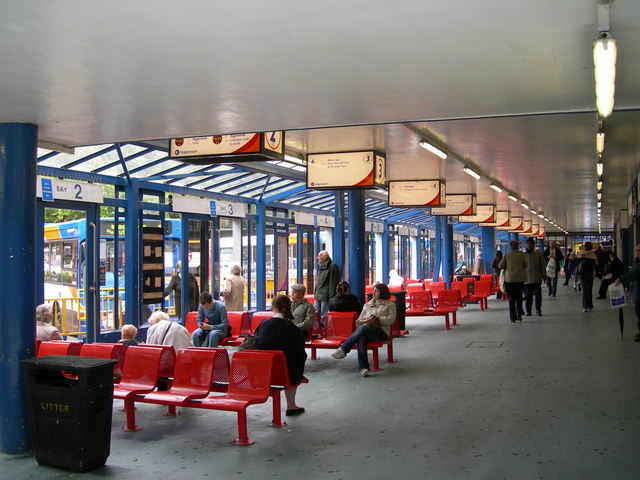
Interior
